= Mercury Grand Marquis =

Full-size automobile produced by Mercury (1975-2011)

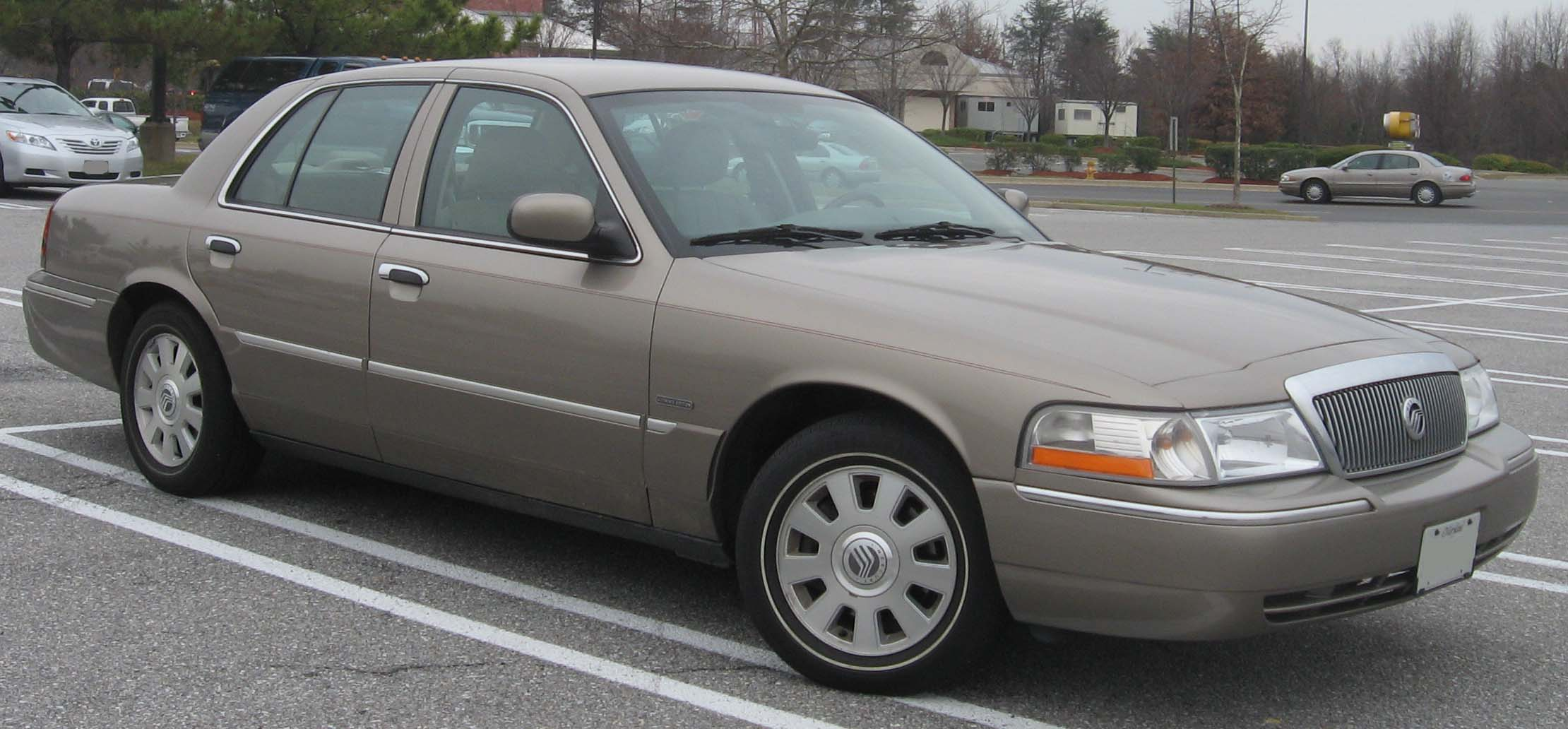
- 2003–2004 Mercury Grand Marquis

Overview
- Manufacturer: Mercury (Ford)
- Also called: Ford Grand Marquis (Mexico and Venezuela)
- Model years: 1975–2011

Body and chassis
- Class: Full-size
- Platform: Ford Panther platform
- Chassis: Body-on-frame
- Related: Ford LTD Crown Victoria; Lincoln Town Car

Chronology
- Predecessor: Mercury Marquis

The Mercury Grand Marquis is an automobile that was produced by Mercury from the 1975 until 2011 model years. Introduced as the flagship sub-model of the Mercury Marquis in 1975, the Grand Marquis became a stand-alone model line in 1983, serving as the largest Mercury sedan. The model line served as the sedan counterpart of the Mercury Colony Park station wagon up to 1991. The fourth generation was the basis of the 2003 and 2004 Mercury Marauder.

From 1979 until 2011, the Grand Marquis shared the rear-wheel drive (RWD) Panther platform with the Ford LTD Crown Victoria (Ford Crown Victoria after 1992), and from 1980, the Lincoln Town Car. For over three decades, the Ford and Mercury sedans were functionally identical, with two of the three generations of the model line sharing the same roofline. The Grand Marquis was available as a four-door sedan for nearly its entire run; from 1988 to its final year in 2011, it was the only body style that was offered. A four-door hardtop was available from 1975 to 1978 and a two-door hardtop coupe from 1975 to 1987.

The Grand Marquis was the second-best-selling Mercury line (after the Cougar) with 2.7 million units produced; at 36 years of continuous production, the Grand Marquis was the longest-running Mercury nameplate (the Cougar, 34 years). Ford manufactured the Grand Marquis, alongside the Mercury Marquis, Mercury Marauder, Ford (LTD) Crown Victoria, and (beginning in 2007) the Lincoln Town Car, at two facilities: the St. Louis Assembly Plant in Hazelwood, Missouri (1979–1985) and the St. Thomas Assembly Plant in Southwold, Ontario, Canada (1986–2011).

Ford announced the discontinuation of the Mercury brand in 2010, but a few 2011 model-year Mercurys were made. The last Grand Marquis - and the final Mercury branded car - was produced on January 4, 2011, at St. Thomas Assembly in Ontario, Canada.

== 1975–1978 ==
1975–1978
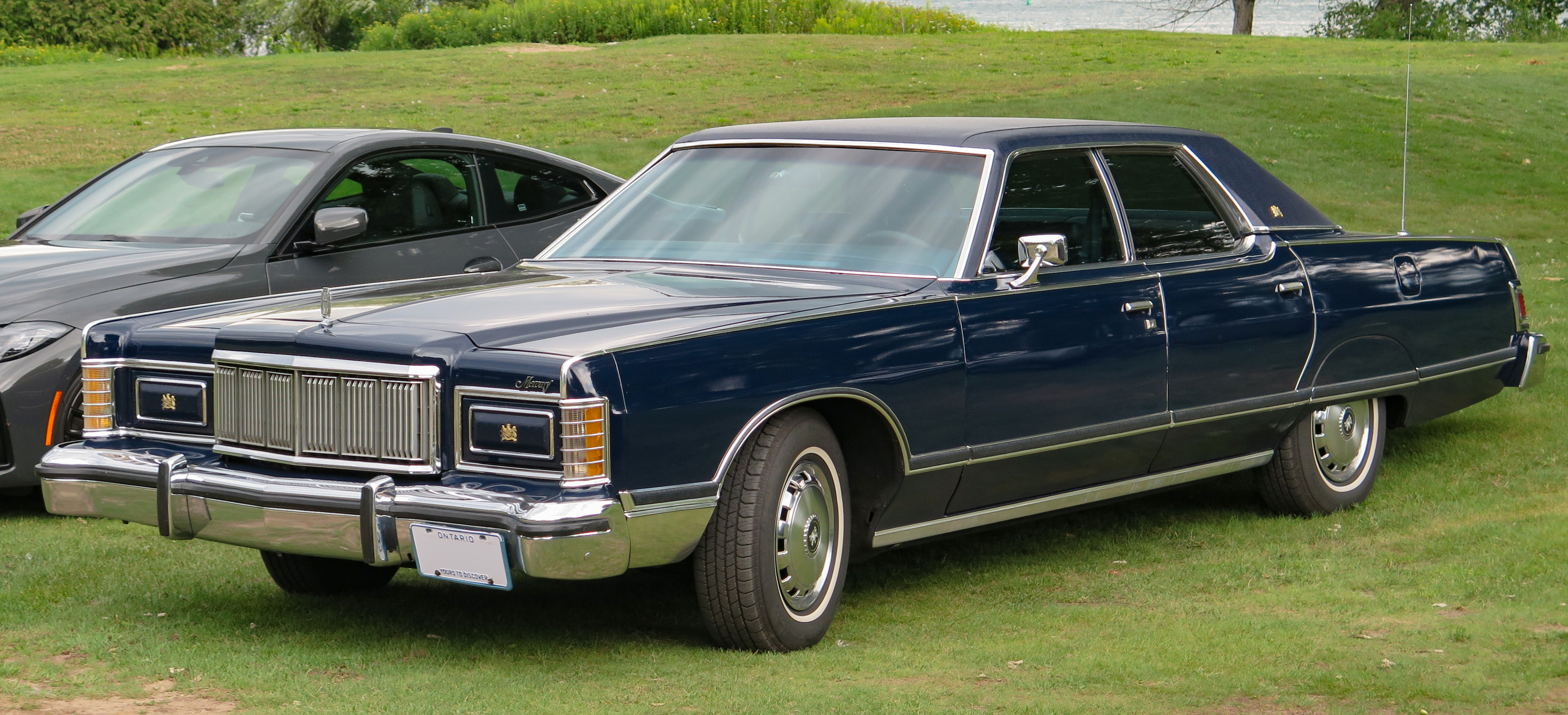
- 1978 Mercury Grand Marquis four-door thin-pillar hardtop

Overview
- Model years: 1975–1978
- Assembly: Hazelwood, Missouri (St. Louis Assembly Plant); Pico Rivera, California (Los Angeles Assembly); Hapeville, Georgia (Atlanta Assembly)

Body and chassis
- Class: Full-size car
- Body style: 2/4-door hardtop
- Layout: FR layout (body on frame)
- Platform: Full-size Ford
- Related: Mercury Colony Park; Ford LTD; Ford Country Squire; Lincoln Continental

For the 1967 model year, Mercury introduced the Mercury Marquis two-door hardtop as a divisional counterpart of the Ford LTD. Distinguishing it from other Mercury two-door hardtops, the Marquis included a standard vinyl roof and upright rear side windows that were similar to the Cougar.

For 1969, the division revised its full-size range. The Monterey was retained as the standard-trim model, with the Marquis replacing the previous Montclair and Park Lane (the Marquis Brougham became the top Mercury, replacing the Park Lane Brougham). The Marauder returned as a fastback Marquis (replacing the S-55), lasting through 1970. Mercury discontinued separate station wagon models, with the Colony Park becoming a Marquis-based station wagon.

The Grand Marquis name made its first appearance in 1974 as part of an interior trim package for the Marquis Brougham. In addition to a wood-trim steering wheel, the interior was fitted with leather-and-velour split-bench seats.

For 1975, all full-size Mercury sedans adopted the Marquis nameplate, as the division retired the Monterey (in use since 1950). To expand the model range, the Grand Marquis became the highest-trim Marquis (slotted above the Brougham). Bridging the price and content gap between the Marquis Brougham and the Lincoln Continental, the Mercury Grand Marquis gave the division a vehicle to compete against premium medium-brand sedans, including the Buick Electra 225, Oldsmobile Ninety Eight, and the Chrysler New Yorker Brougham. The Grand Marquis was offered in either a four-door "pillared hardtop" sedan or a two-door hardtop sedan body style; as with the Marquis and Colony Park (and the Lincoln Continental), hidden headlights were standard. The model line included the 460 cu in (7.5 L) V8. A 400 cu in (6.6 L) V8 became standard for 1976 and 1977, with a 351 cu in (5.8 L) V8 becoming standard for 1978 (except in California, where the 400 V8 was standard). Through 1978, the 460 V8 was optional. All engines were paired with a three-speed automatic transmission. Shared with the Lincoln Continental, four-wheel disc brakes were optional.

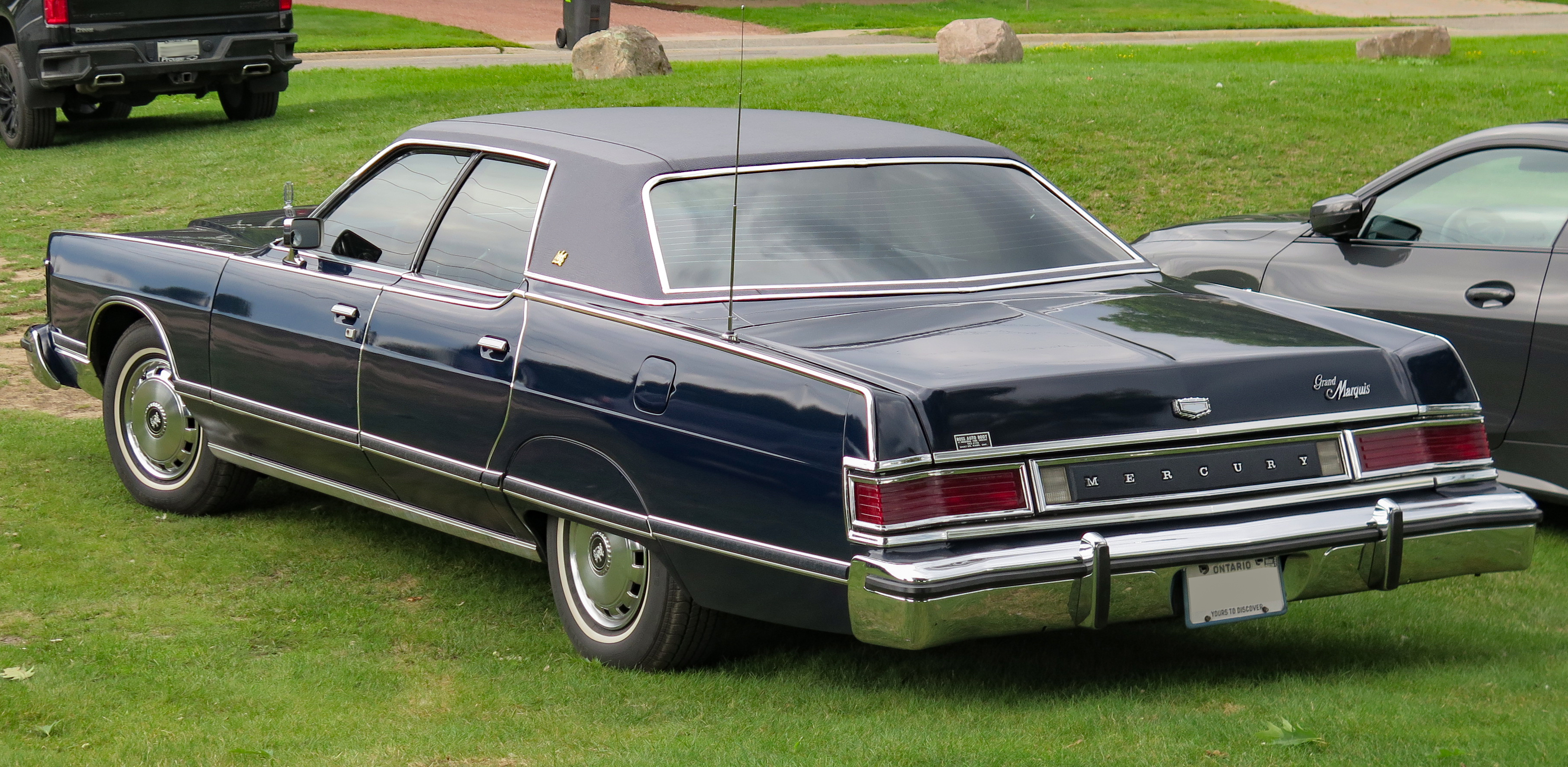
1978 Mercury Grand Marquis four-door thin-pillar hardtop, rear view

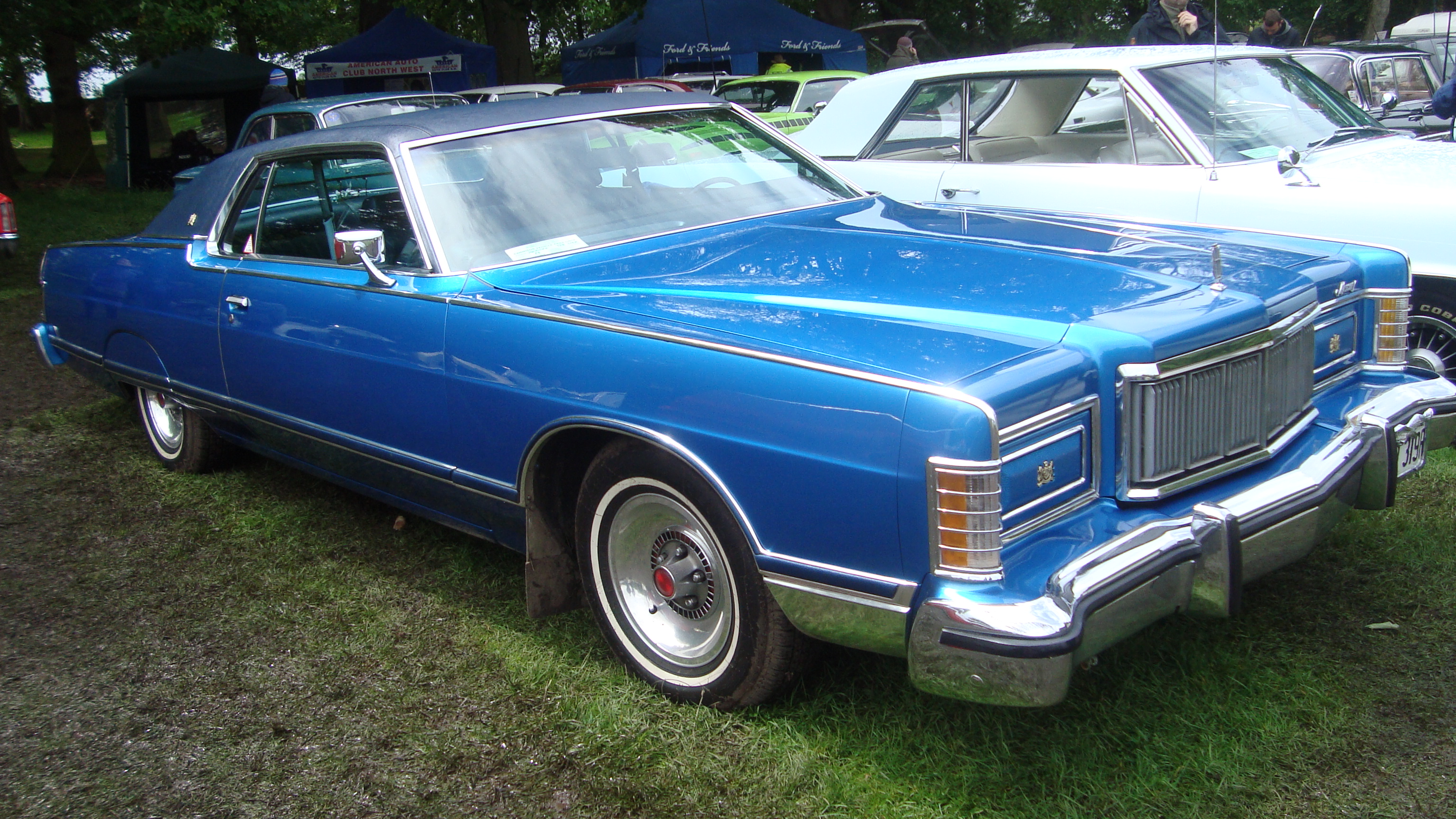
1978 Mercury Grand Marquis two-door hardtop

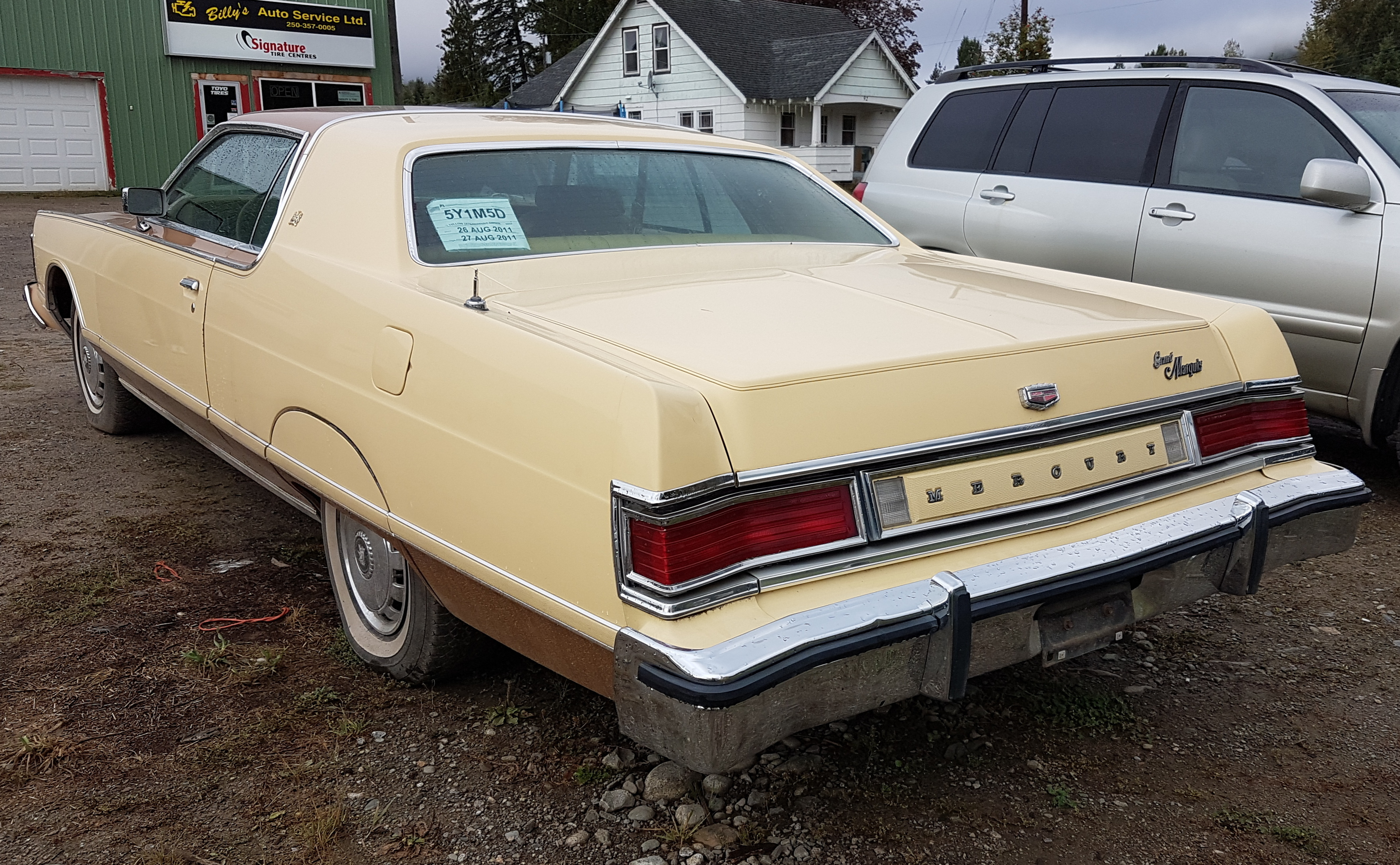
1978 Mercury Grand Marquis 2-door hardtop, rear 3/4 view

== First generation (1979–1991) ==
First generation
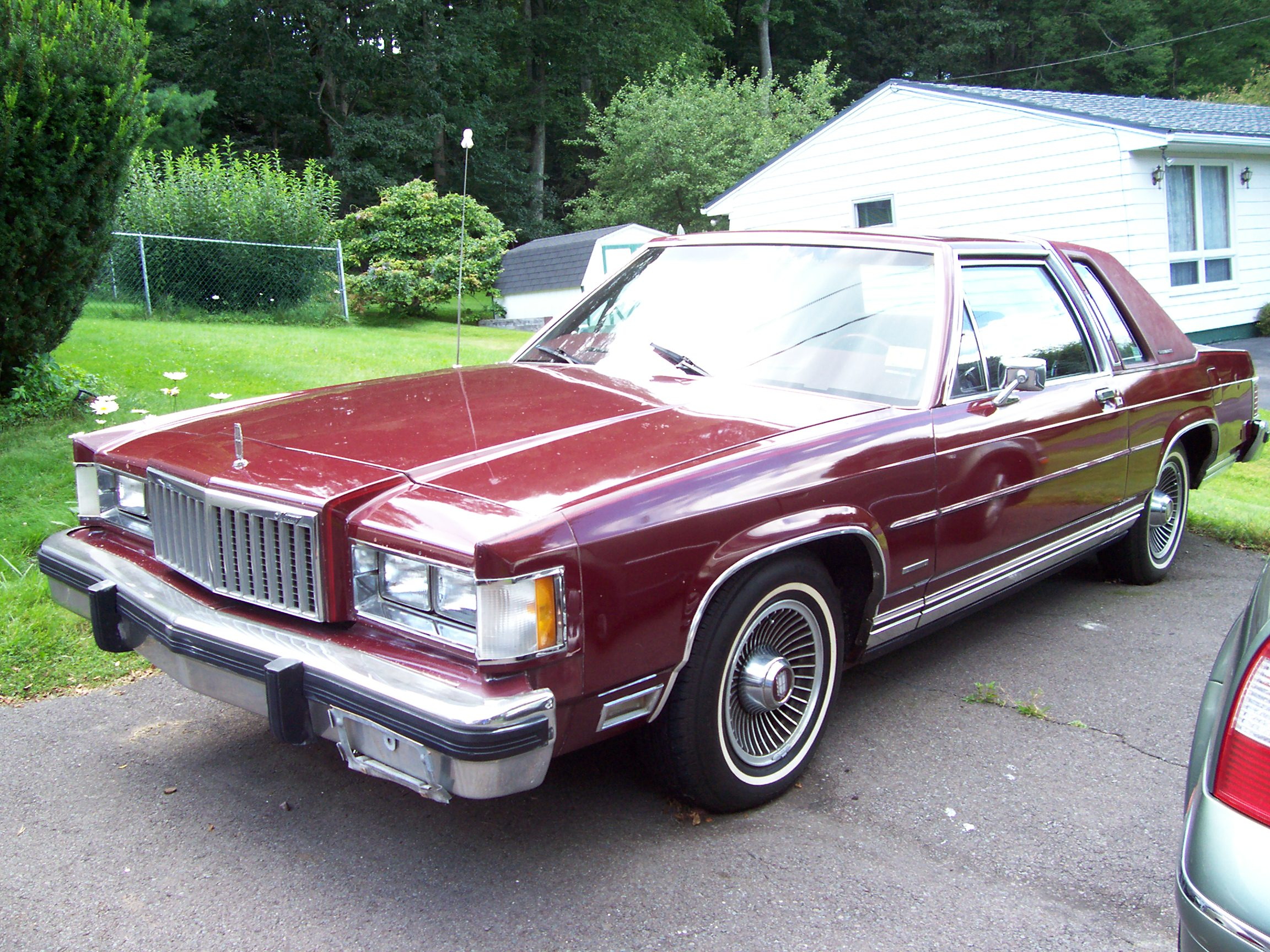
- 1983 Mercury Grand Marquis LS two-door Sedan

Overview
- Also called: Ford Conquistador (Venezuela, 1984–1989); Ford Grand Marquis (Mexico, 1982–1984)
- Model years: 1979–1991; 987,818 produced
- Assembly: Canada: St. Thomas, Ontario (St. Thomas Assembly); United States: Hazelwood, Missouri (St. Louis Assembly Plant); Venezuela: Barcelona, Anzoátegui (División Industrial Automotriz); Mexico: Cuautitlán Assembly

Body and chassis
- Body style: 2-door coupe 4-door sedan 5-door station wagon
- Related: Mercury Colony Park; Ford LTD Crown Victoria; Ford Country Squire; Lincoln Town Car; Lincoln Continental

Powertrain
- Engine: 302 cu in (4.9 L) 5.0 Windsor V8 (1983–1991); 351 cu in (5.8 L) Windsor V8 (1986–1991)
- Transmission: 4-speed AOD automatic

Dimensions
- Wheelbase: 114.3 in (2,903 mm)
- Length: 213.5 in (5,423 mm)
- Width: 77.5 in (1,968 mm)
- Height: 55.4 in (1,407 mm)

For the 1979 model year, the full-size Mercury model line was downsized. The Grand Marquis returned as the premium model of the Mercury Marquis model range. The cars were 17 inches shorter and nearly 1,000 pounds lighter (depending on the powertrain) than their 1978 predecessor. While its exterior footprint closely matched the Cougar (Montego) intermediate sedan, the 1979 Grand Marquis offered more interior and luggage space.

Alongside the extensive downsizing of the model line, the Ford LTD Crown Victoria was introduced for the 1980 model year, serving as the first direct divisional counterpart of the Grand Marquis. Both vehicles shared nearly identical exterior designs except for front and rear fascias.

During the early 1980s, all three Ford divisions revised their full-size and mid-size models. For 1983, the Mercury lineup moved the Marquis nameplate to the mid-size segment (replacing the previous mid-size Cougar), introducing an all-new Cougar coupe (replacing the previous Cougar XR7), and discontinuing the Zephyr (replaced by the smaller front-wheel drive 1984 Topaz). The Grand Marquis now served as the full-size Mercury; for the first time since 1951, Mercury produced a single full-size sedan nameplate (alongside the Colony Park station wagon).

The "downsized" Grand Marquis introduced in 1979 would remain in production throughout the 1980s, as competitors such as the Buick Electra, Oldsmobile 98, and Chrysler New Yorker (and Fifth Avenue) were downsized further and adopted front-wheel drive. Amid these mid-tier competitors, the Grand Marquis eventually became the only option on the market with rear-wheel drive and a V8 engine; the GM competitors were downsized to a smaller, front-wheel-drive platform for 1985, while Chrysler got out of the traditional full-size market in 1981. Only the full-size GM station wagons carried on as direct competitors to the Mercury Colony Park wagon during the late 1980s.

Along with its stablemates, the Ford LTD Crown Victoria and Lincoln Town Car, the Grand Marquis received a light refresh in 1988 that included more rounded front and rear fascias and other subtle updates inside and out. In 1990, a driver's side airbag was introduced as standard equipment to comply with new federal safety regulations.

By 1991, the final year for this generation of Grand Marquis, the only other full-size vehicle to offer both a sedan and wagon variant was the freshly redesigned 1991 Chevy Caprice; the corporate cousin of the Caprice, the Buick Roadmaster, wouldn't offer a sedan until the 1992 model year, while the Oldsmobile Custom Cruiser was strictly available as a wagon for its brief run in 1991 and 1992.

=== Chassis specification ===
The first-generation Grand Marquis was built on the rear-wheel drive Ford Panther platform. While Ford and Mercury sedans had shared common chassis underpinnings since 1961, the Panther chassis marked the first time the two model lines shared the same wheelbase with the Mercury downsized from 124 to 114.3 in (3,150 to 2,903 mm).

Although reduced in size, the Grand Marquis retained the suspension design with a live rear axle suspension and double wishbone independent front suspension, with coil springs at all four wheels. In 1985, gas-charged shock absorbers were standardized for the model line, with load-leveling rear air suspension introduced as an option. The Grand Marquis featured front vented disc brakes and rear drum brakes.

For 1986, 15-inch wheels returned as standard equipment (after having been an option since 1979).

==== Powertrain ====
The previous standard 4.2 L (255 cu in) V8 was discontinued, and the 4.9 L (302 cu in) V8 (rounded up to "5.0 L" by Ford) became the sole engine available through 1991. The throttle-body fuel injection engine was rated at 130 hp (97 kW; 132 PS). Starting with the 1986 model year, the engine adopted multi-port fuel injection with a cast-aluminum upper intake manifold, increasing output to 150 hp (112 kW; 152 PS).

The 4.9 L (302 cu in) V8 engine was paired with the four-speed AOD overdrive automatic transmission.

Engine name	Years available	Configuration	Horsepower	Torque	Transmission
Ford 5.0 L Windsor V8	1983–1991	302 cu in (4.9 L) OHV V8	130 hp (97 kW; 132 PS) (1983); 140 hp (104 kW; 142 PS) (1984–1985, US); 155 hp (116 kW; 157 PS) (1984–1985, Canada); 150 hp (112 kW; 152 PS) (1986–1991)	240 lb⋅ft (325 N⋅m) (1983); 250 lb⋅ft (339 N⋅m) (1984–1985, US); 265 lb⋅ft (359 N⋅m) (1984–1985, Canada); 270 lb⋅ft (366 N⋅m) (1986–1991)	Ford AOD 4-speed overdrive automatic
Ford Windsor V8	1986–1991	5.8 L (351 cu in) OHV V8	180 hp (134 kW; 182 PS)	285 lb⋅ft (386 N⋅m)	Ford AOD 4-speed overdrive automatic

=== Body ===
Mercury offered the first-generation Grand Marquis solely as a sedan in two-door and four-door configurations. For 1983 only, the Grand Marquis was offered as a station wagon (effectively a Colony Park without woodgrain trim); from 1984 onward, all full-size Mercury wagons were Colony Parks. While styled nearly identical to the LTD Crown Victoria, the first-generation Grand Marquis was three inches longer than its Ford counterpart; alongside the doors and front and rear windows, only the bumpers are externally shared between the two model lines.

After the 1987 model year, the two-door Grand Marquis was discontinued; only 4,904 were produced.

==== Exterior ====
In contrast to the stainless-steel band surrounding the B-pillars of the LTD Crown Victoria, the Grand Marquis was offered with multiple vinyl roof configurations, sharing the B-pillar "coach lamps" of the Lincoln Town Car. Alongside the standard half-length vinyl roof, a full-length roof was offered; the LS offered an additional option of a "formal roof," configured with a "frenched" rear window. The Grand Marquis was styled with a different rear fascia, using full-width taillamps (separated by the license plate).

During its production, the first-generation Grand Marquis underwent minor changes. For 1982, simulated vents were removed from the front fenders. Starting with the 1983 model year, the grille and taillamps were redesigned as the Grand Marquis became a distinct model line. For 1985, to lower production costs, the external "Electronic Fuel Injection" and "Automatic Overdrive" emblems were deleted (both had become standard features); for 1986, a CHMSL (center brake light) was introduced.

For 1988, the Grand Marquis underwent a mid-cycle revision, with restyled front and rear fascias, better integrating the bumpers into the bodywork. To save weight, steel bumpers were replaced by aluminum.

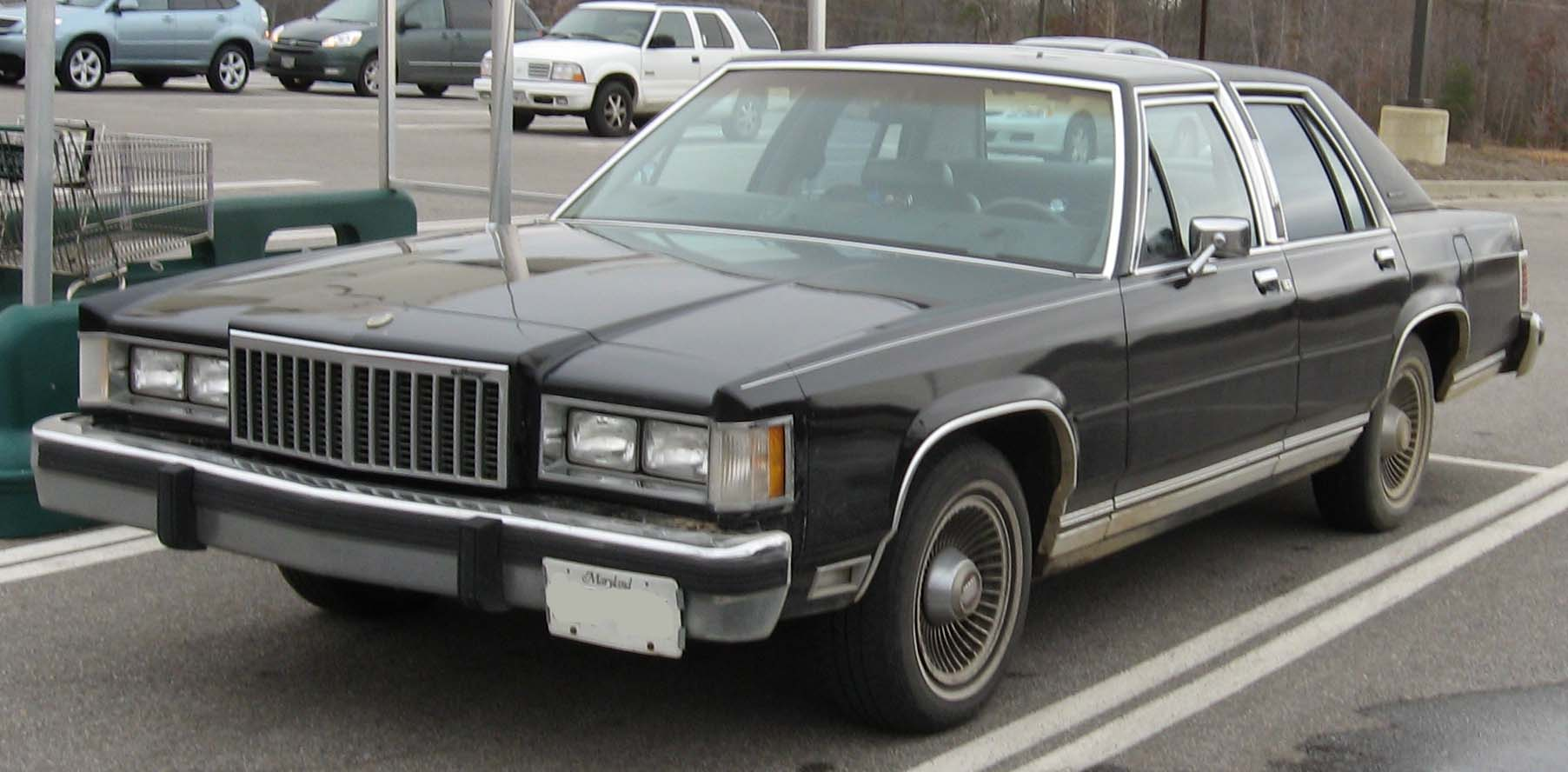
1983–1987 Grand Marquis LS

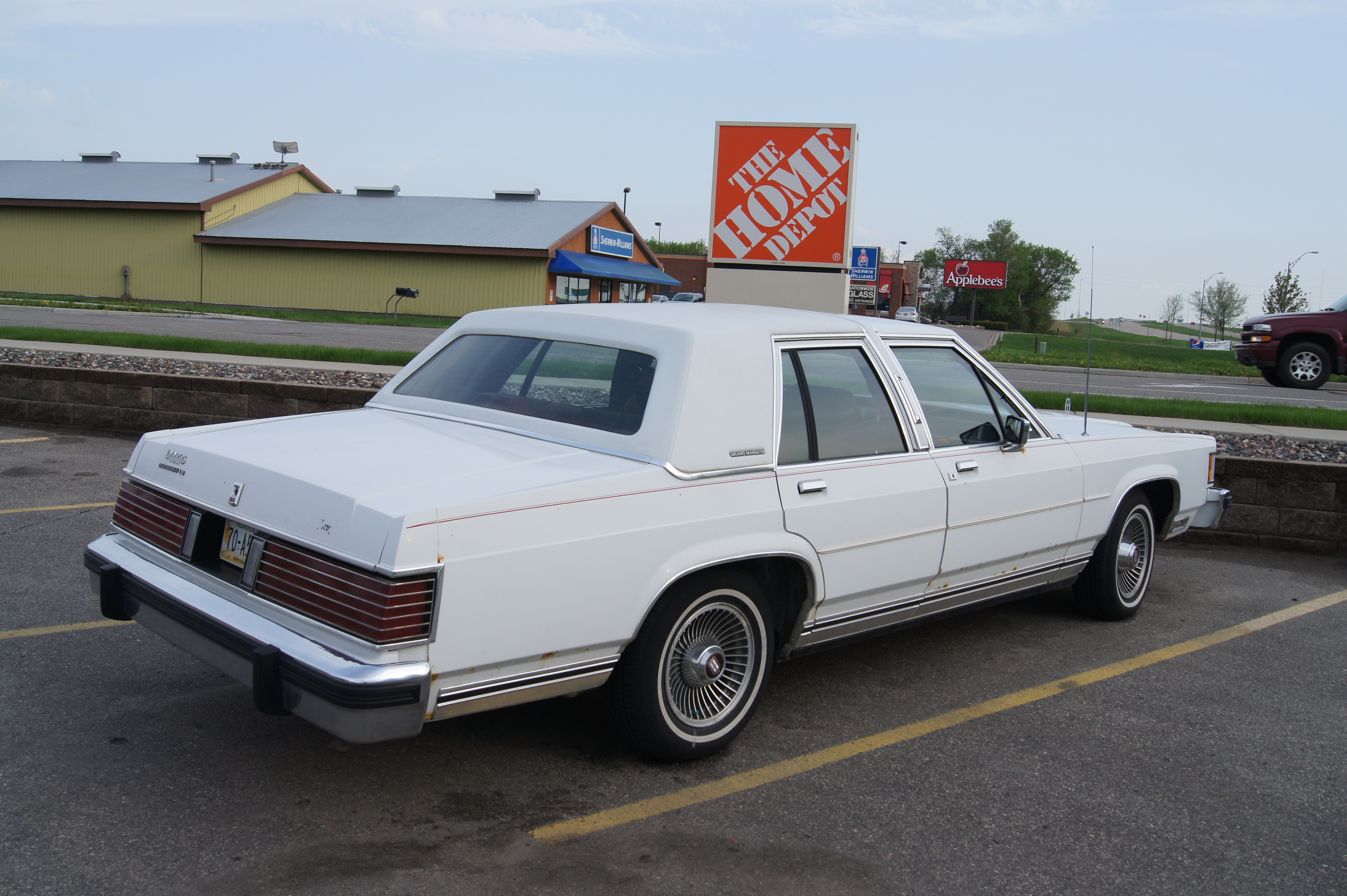
1983–1987 Grand Marquis, showing formal roof configuration

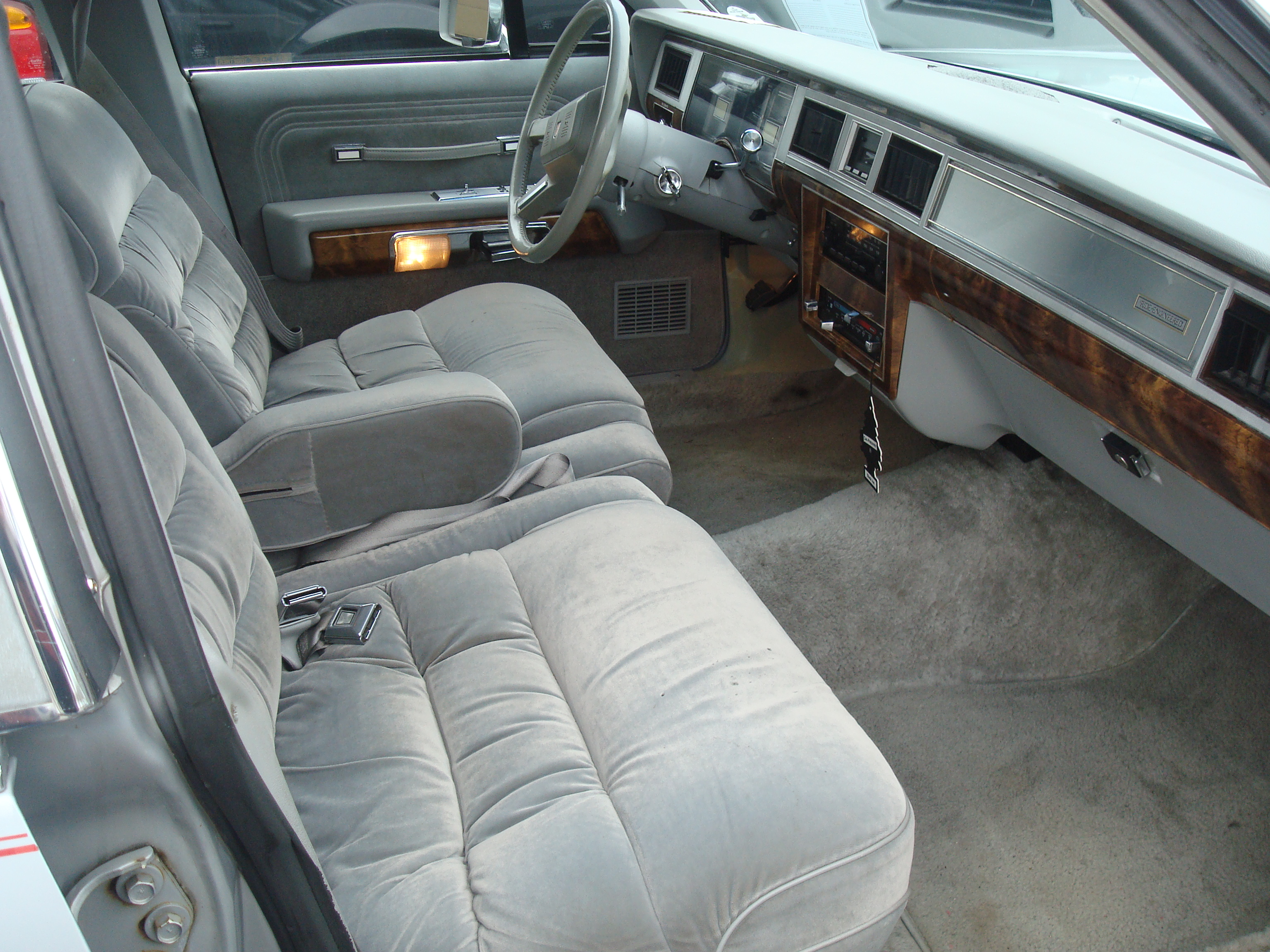
1985 Grand Marquis LS interior

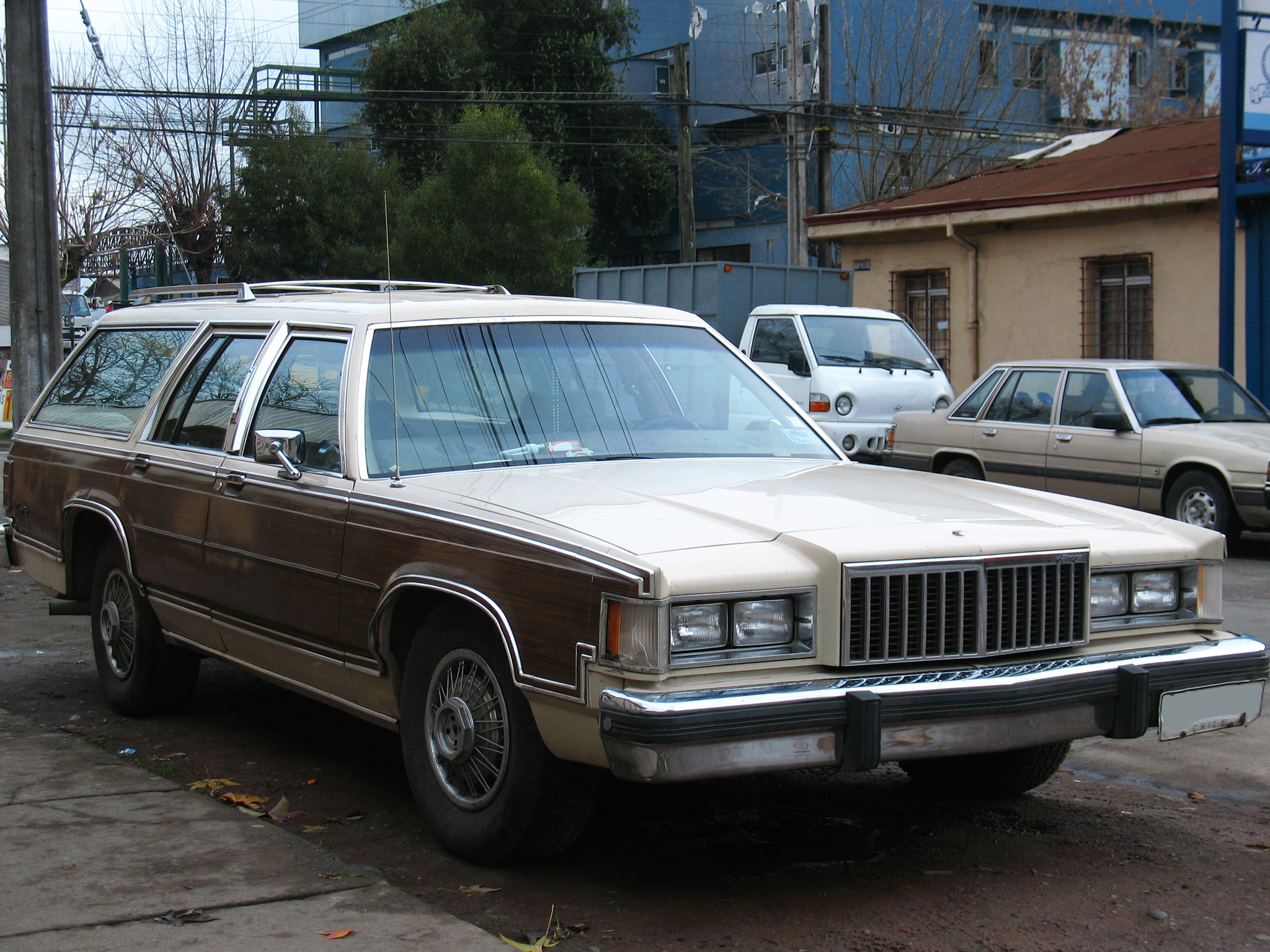
1987 Mercury Grand Marquis Wagon

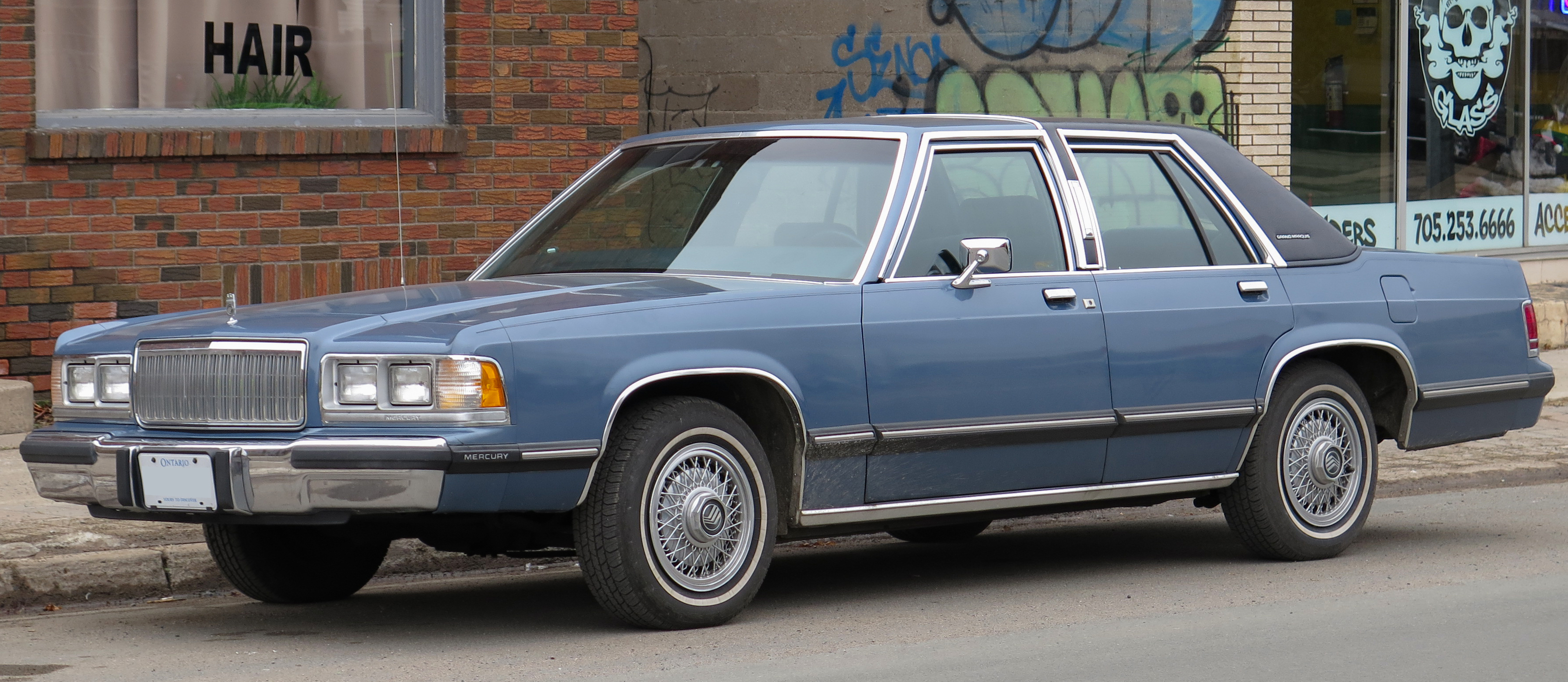
1988–1989 Grand Marquis GS

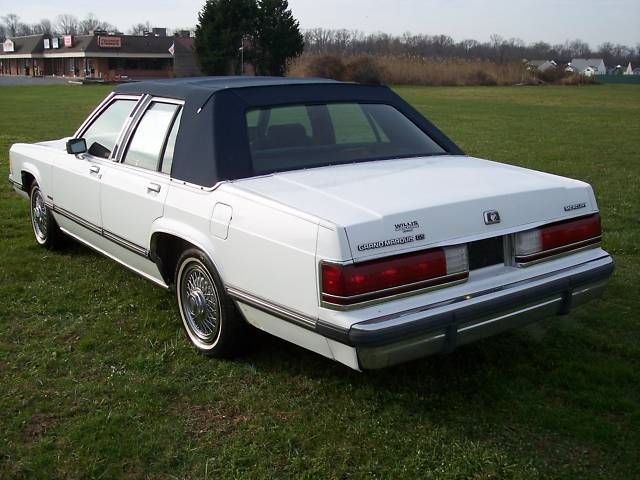
1989 Grand Marquis LS, showing the full-length roof

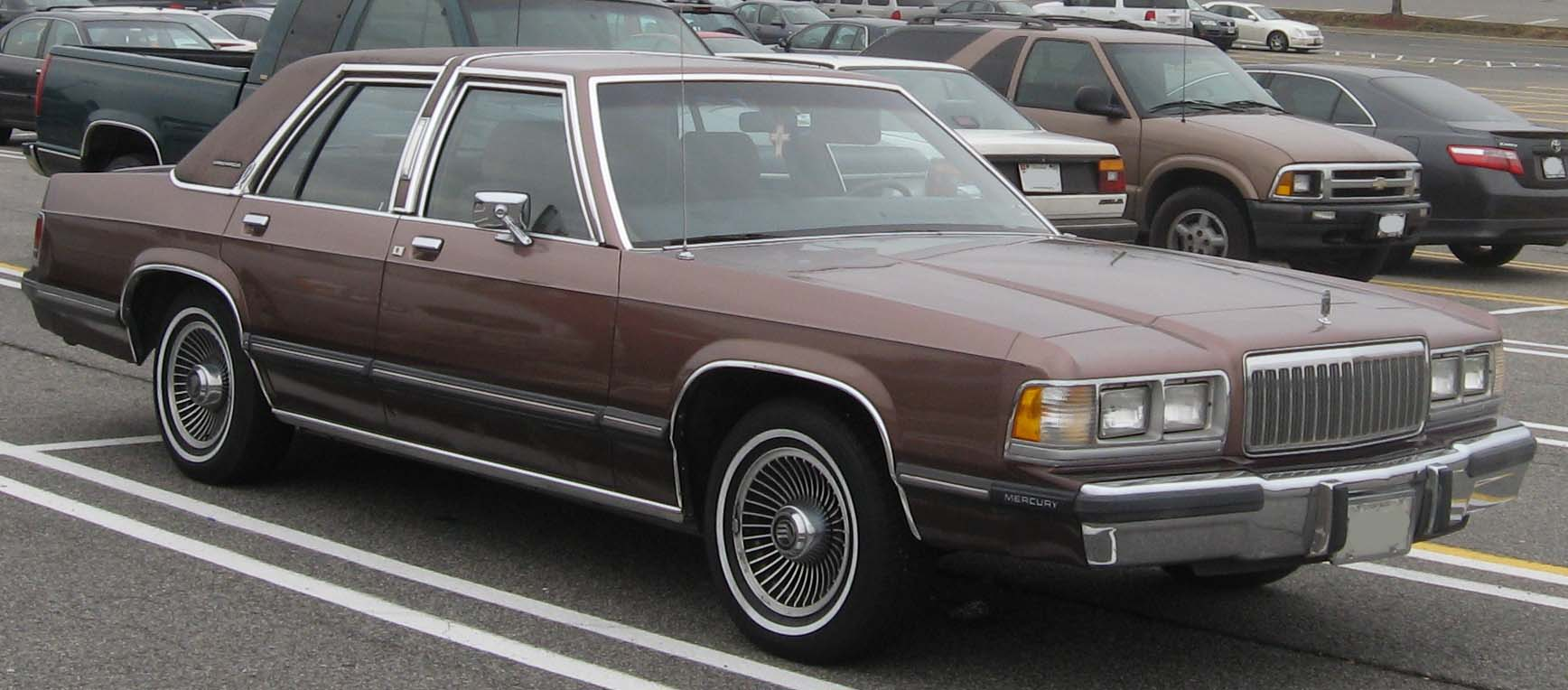
1988–1989 Grand Marquis LS

==== Interior ====
From 1979 to 1991, the Grand Marquis sedan was offered solely as a six-passenger sedan with a front bench seat. While mostly similar to its Ford counterpart, the dashboard of the Grand Marquis was trimmed with brushed stainless steel; in place of the horizontal speedometer, the Grand Marquis was fitted with two square pods for the fuel gauge, warning lights, and speedometer.

In 1985, the dashboard underwent several revisions. Alongside the adoption of a single-DIN radio unit (phased in across all Ford vehicles), the 8-track cassette player and CB radio options were discontinued; control of the horn shifted from the turn signal stalk to the steering wheel.

As part of the 1988 revision, the interior was updated with all-new seats (distinguished by taller head restraints) and an updated dashboard (with more wood trim and revised gauges). The Grand Marquis LS received options including a JBL Audio 6-speaker AM/FM/Cassette stereo system (with a power antenna) and a heated windshield called "Instaclear."

For 1990, the interior underwent a second major revision. To comply with passive-restraint regulations, the Grand Marquis was given a driver-side airbag; the rear outboard seats received 3-point seatbelts. Coinciding with the addition of the airbag, a new steering column consolidated the turn signal and windshield wiper controls onto a single stalk; tilt steering became standard. The dashboard was completely redesigned, adopted the horizontal speedometer used by Ford (using a silver background); for the first time, a temperature gauge was included alongside the fuel gauge.

=== Trim ===
From 1979 to 1982, the Grand Marquis returned as a sub-model of the Mercury Marquis model line. Marketed as the flagship Mercury nameplate, the Grand Marquis competed against the Buick Electra, Oldsmobile 98, and Chrysler New Yorker (and New Yorker Fifth Avenue). For 1983, the Grand Marquis was expanded to an unnamed standard trim and the top-trim LS. The former effectively replaced the Marquis Brougham (the mid-size Marquis adopted the Brougham nameplate), and the latter was a trim designation adopted across the Mercury model line during the 1980s.

As part of the 1988 model update, the standard-trim Grand Marquis became the GS (in line with the Topaz and Sable). The badging of the model line underwent a revision, as the script lettering used since its 1975 introduction was replaced by block-style lettering (in the style of the Sable, Topaz, and Tracer); the Lincoln-style hood ornament was replaced by a version with the Mercury "flying M" badge," which were added to the trunk lid and wheels.

=== Production ===
Production figures
Year	1983	1984	1985	1986	1987	1988	1989	1990	1991	Total production
Units	95,718	131,396	147,139	98,929	120,503	111,611	130,248	72,945	79,329	987,818

== Second generation (1992–1997) ==
Second generation (EN53)
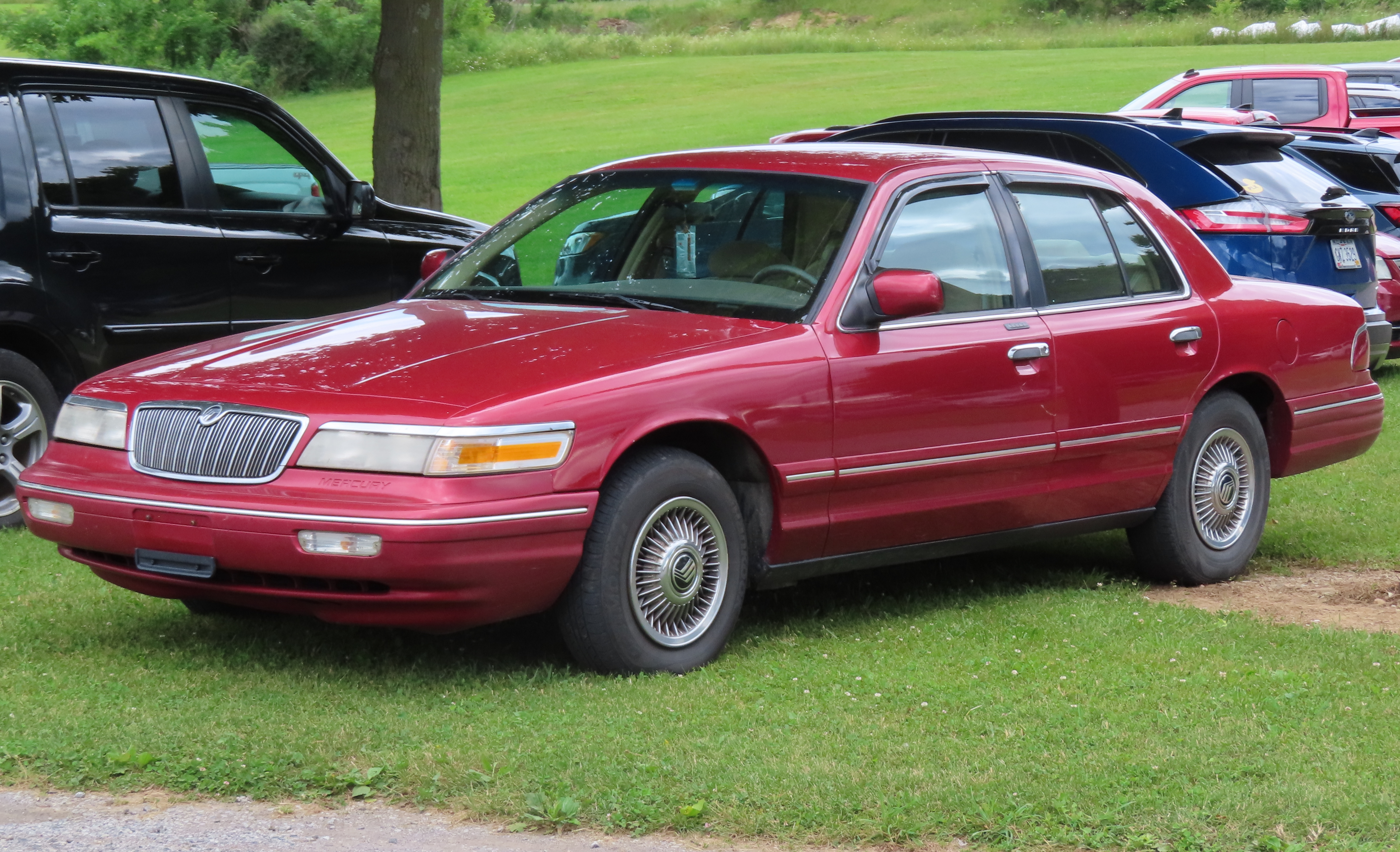
- 1997 Mercury Grand Marquis GS

Overview
- Also called: Ford Grand Marquis (Mexico)
- Production: January 14, 1991–October 1997
- Model years: 1992–1997
- Assembly: Canada: St. Thomas, Ontario (St. Thomas Assembly)

Body and chassis
- Body style: 4-door sedan
- Related: Ford Crown Victoria; Ford Police Interceptor; Lincoln Town Car

Powertrain
- Engine: 4.6 L Modular V8
- Transmission: 4-speed AOD automatic 4-speed AOD-E automatic 4-speed 4R70W automatic

Dimensions
- Wheelbase: 114.4 in (2,906 mm)
- Length: 212.4 in (5,395 mm) (1992–94); 211.8 in (5,380 mm) (1995–97)
- Width: 77.8 in (1,976 mm) (1992–94); 78.0 in (1,981 mm) (1995–97)
- Height: 56.8 in (1,443 mm)

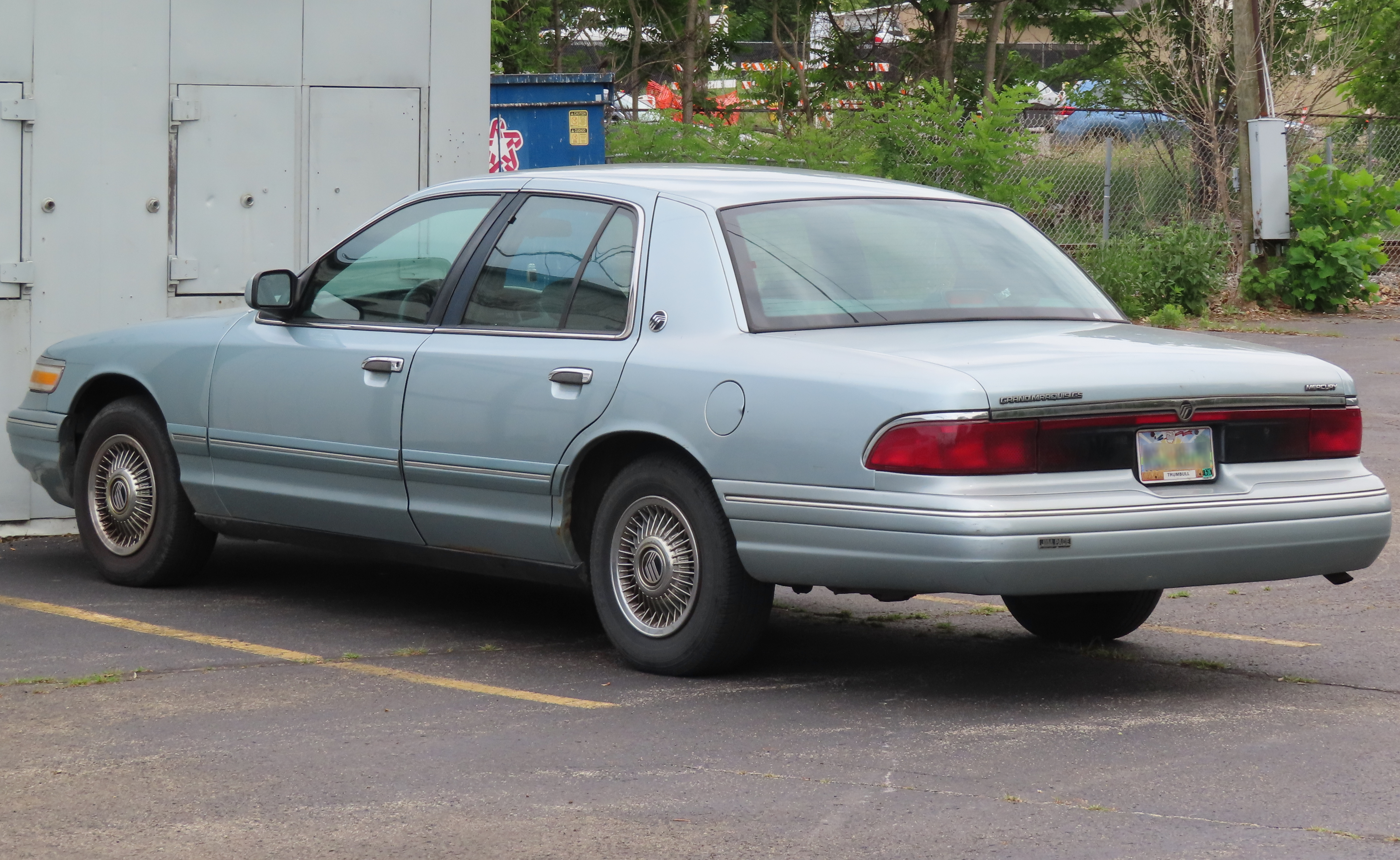
1996 Mercury Grand Marquis GS, rear view

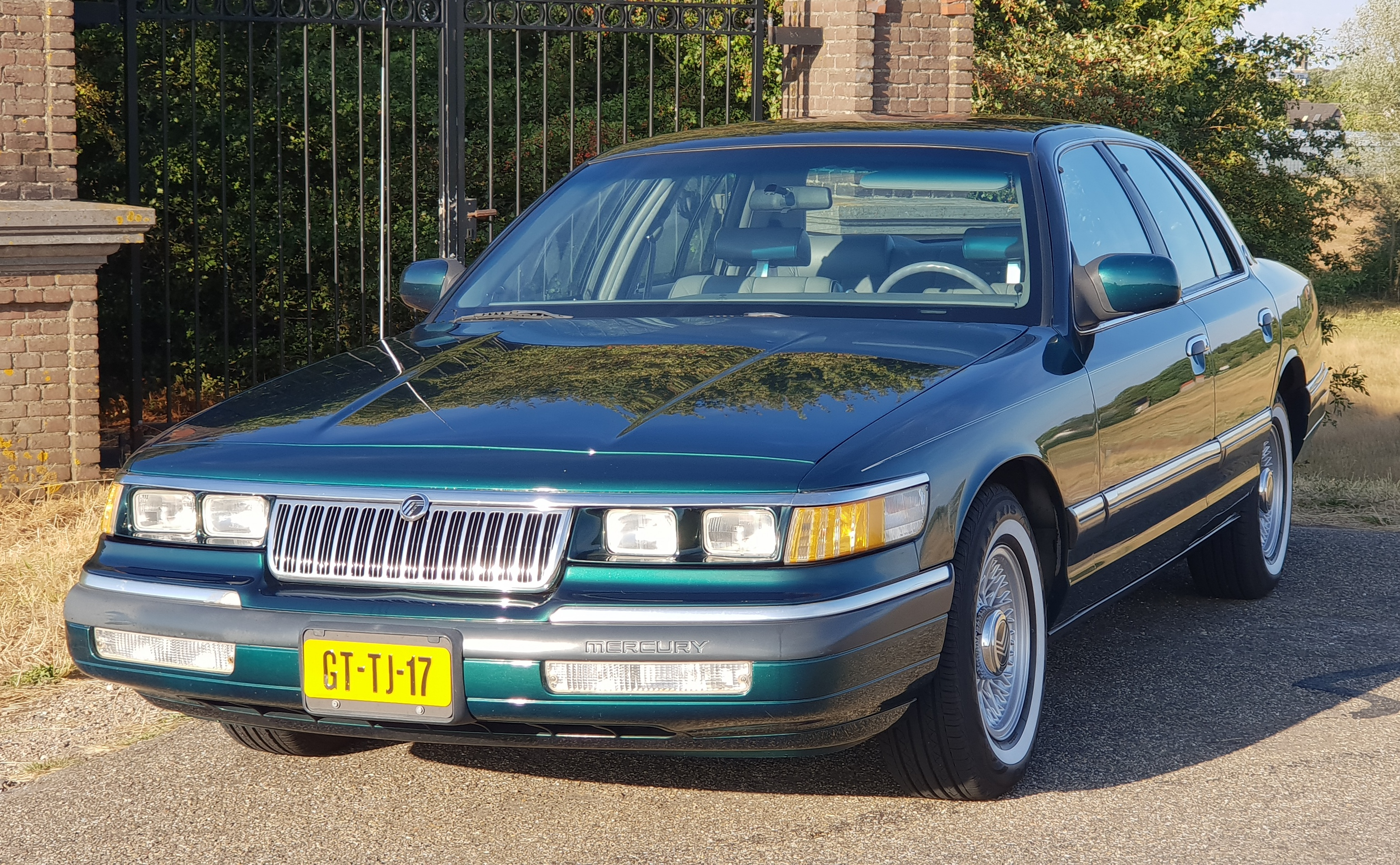
1993 Grand Marquis LS (Netherlands)

Unveiled on November 28, 1990, for the 1992 model year, both Ford and Mercury Panther-platform cars underwent their most extensive changes since their introduction for the 1979 model year. While the chassis was retained, the body was all-new. After thirteen years on the market, the full-size sedans from Mercury and Ford were struggling against far more modern competition. Additionally, as an unintentional consequence of years of badge engineering, the Grand Marquis and its LTD Crown Victoria counterpart were left as virtual identical twins. The Grand Marquis and Ford Crown Victoria (no longer an LTD model) were given different bodies; the only visually shared body parts were the front doors and the windshield. Development began in early 1987, with a design approval in 1988, January 14, 1991, the start of production, and March 21, 1991, introduction.

In line with the rest of the Ford Motor Company vehicles sold in North America, aerodynamics and fuel economy played a prominent role in designing the new Grand Marquis. Unlike the Crown Victoria, which followed the design themes of the Ford Taurus, the Grand Marquis continued with traditional styling features, such as full-width taillights, a formal roofline, and a chrome waterfall grille. The chrome waterfall grille became a signature styling feature across the Mercury product line from the late 1990s.

As part of the redesign, Ford sought a new type of buyer for its full-size Mercury sedan; instead of the older buyers who traditionally bought them, the 1992 Grand Marquis was marketed to younger buyers in need of a larger car than a Ford Taurus/Mercury Sable. The opera lamps and padded vinyl top were discontinued (the latter becoming a dealer-installed option). Aluminum alloy road wheels replaced the simulated wire wheel covers. Revisions to the suspension and steering were made to improve both ride and handling. Four-wheel disc brakes replaced the rear drum brakes with ABS traction control optional.

As with the 1988-1991 models, the Grand Marquis was available in base-trim GS and deluxe-trim LS models. Front cornering lamps distinguish LS models. From 1992 onward, the Grand Marquis was produced solely as a four-door sedan, as the Colony Park station wagon was discontinued. Ford's proprietary door-mounted keypad system, marketed as Securicode, became optional on lower-trim models and standard on upper-trim packages.

=== Year-to-year changes ===
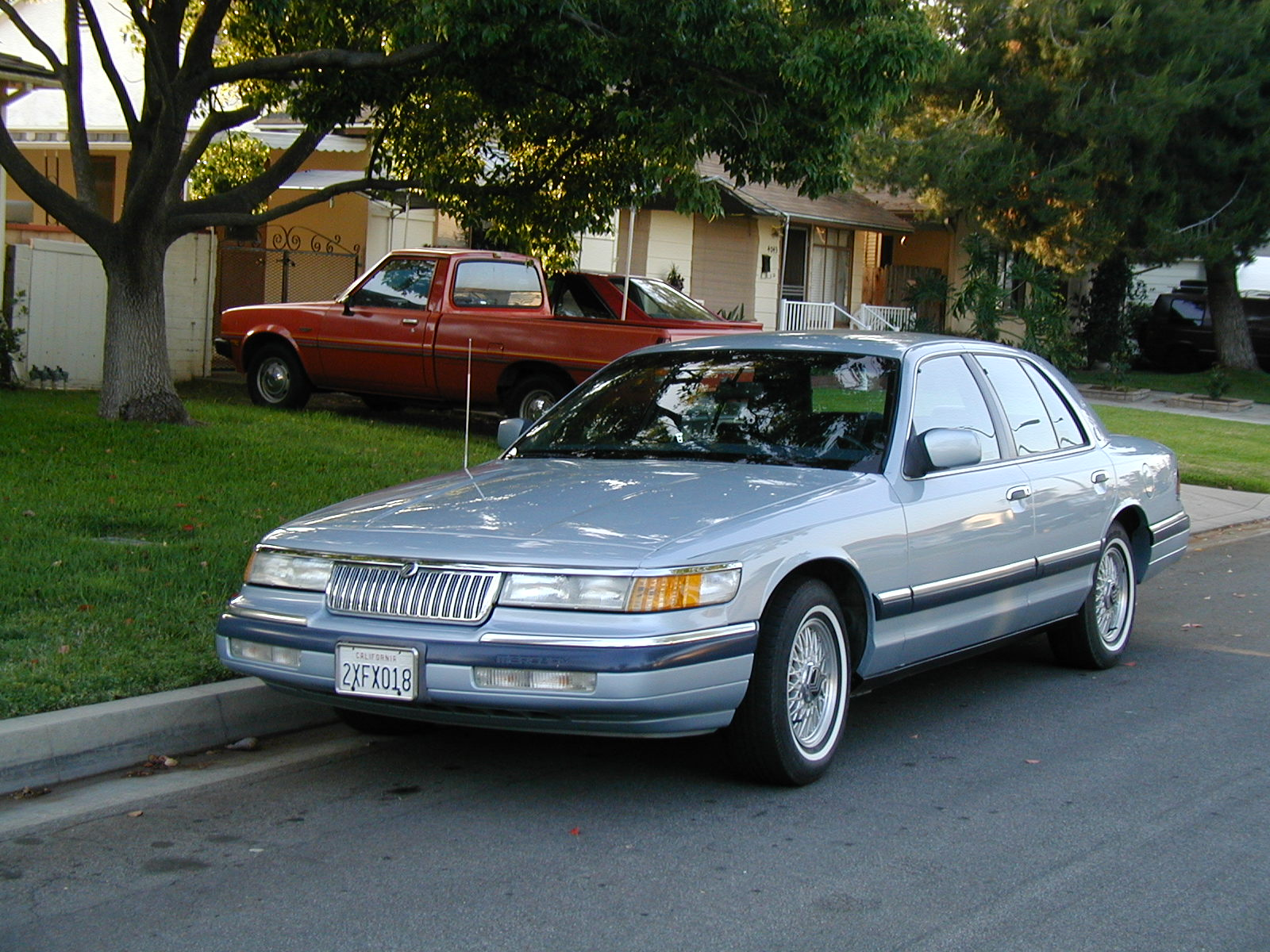
1992 Grand Marquis LS

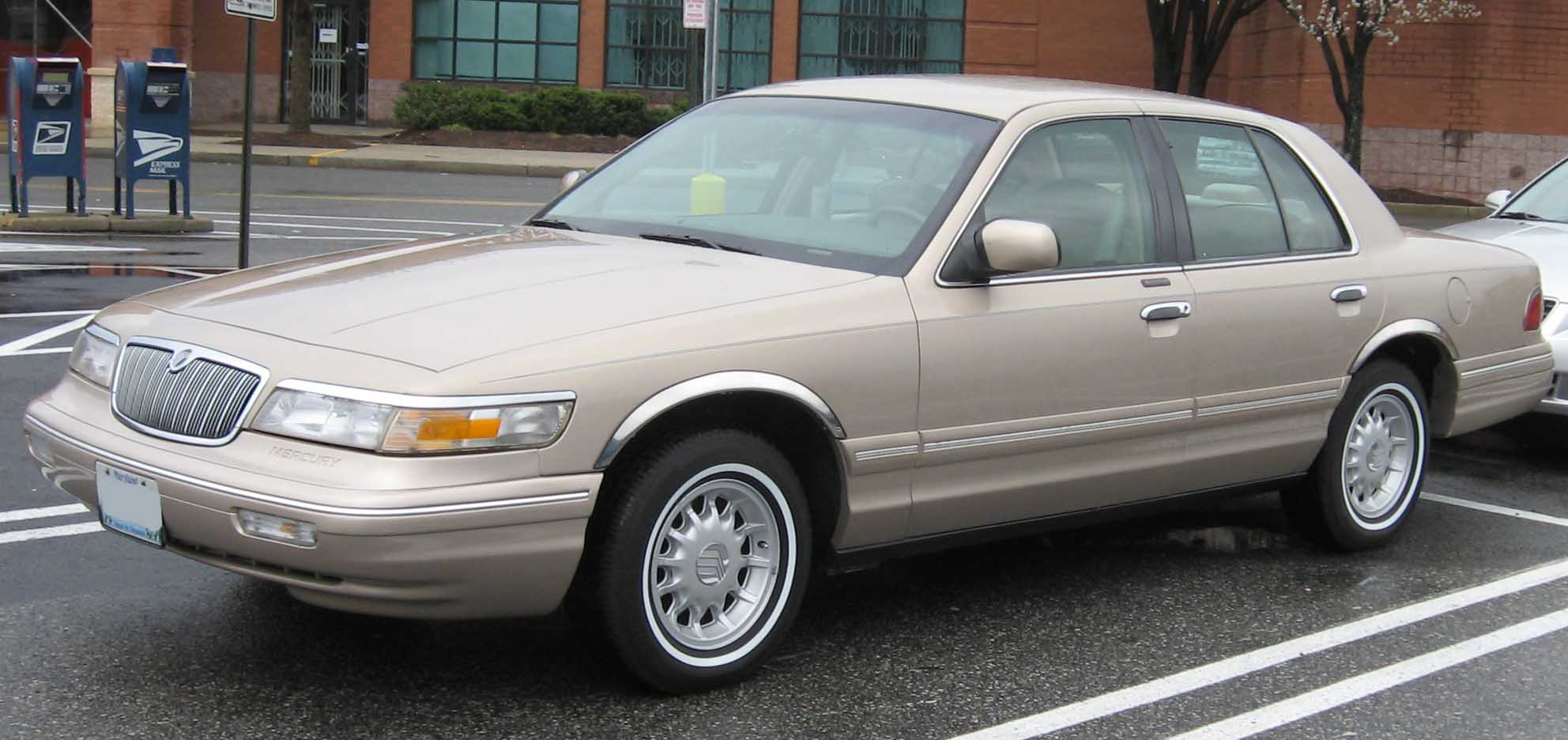
1997 Grand Marquis LS

=== 1992 ===
- Second-generation Grand Marquis introduced at the North American International Auto Show on January 11, 1991, after the November 28, 1990 unveiling. It launched on March 21, 1991, as an early 1992 model. All models come with driver's-side airbag standard with an optional passenger-side airbag. Partway through the model year, the AOD transmission was replaced by the AOD-E, which brought a different bellhousing pattern.

=== 1993 ===
- Dual airbags have become standard equipment for all models. Radios are redesigned with a new control layout.

=== 1994 ===
- Increased side door impact protection. The A/C refrigerant changed from R-12 to R-134a.

=== 1995 ===
- Mid-cycle redesign. Exterior trim features increased use of body-color trim and less chrome. On the front, a larger, rounder grille is better integrated into the body, while all lights on the front are changed to clear lenses. The license plate is now centered in between the taillamps. On the trunk lid, the Mercury and Grand Marquis lettering is italicized and reduced in size. The interior is updated with new seats, door panels, and the dashboard is redesigned. Switching locations with the climate controls, a double-DIN radio featured large buttons and knobs; on models without automatic climate controls, rotary knobs replaced sliding controls. The power seat controls, if specified, were now located on the door panels, along with enlarged buttons for the power windows and door locks. The outdated horizontal speedometer was replaced by the instrument cluster used in the Crown Victoria (adding a voltmeter and oil-pressure gauge); a digital instrument panel with the trip computer was still an option.

=== 1996 ===
- No significant changes. Inside, the Ford "brick" airbag wheel, which has been used since 1990, was replaced with a new design shared with many Ford and Lincoln-Mercury cars, integrating the horn into a smaller steering wheel hub.
- The car could now run on natural gas.
- OBD-II was now used.
- New colors.

=== 1997 ===
- Last year for the second-generation Grand Marquis. The Mercury emblems were removed from the C-pillars. Following the discontinuation of the Chevrolet Caprice and Buick Roadmaster by General Motors, 1997 Grand Marquis sales would rise over 20% in comparison to 1996.

=== Powertrain ===
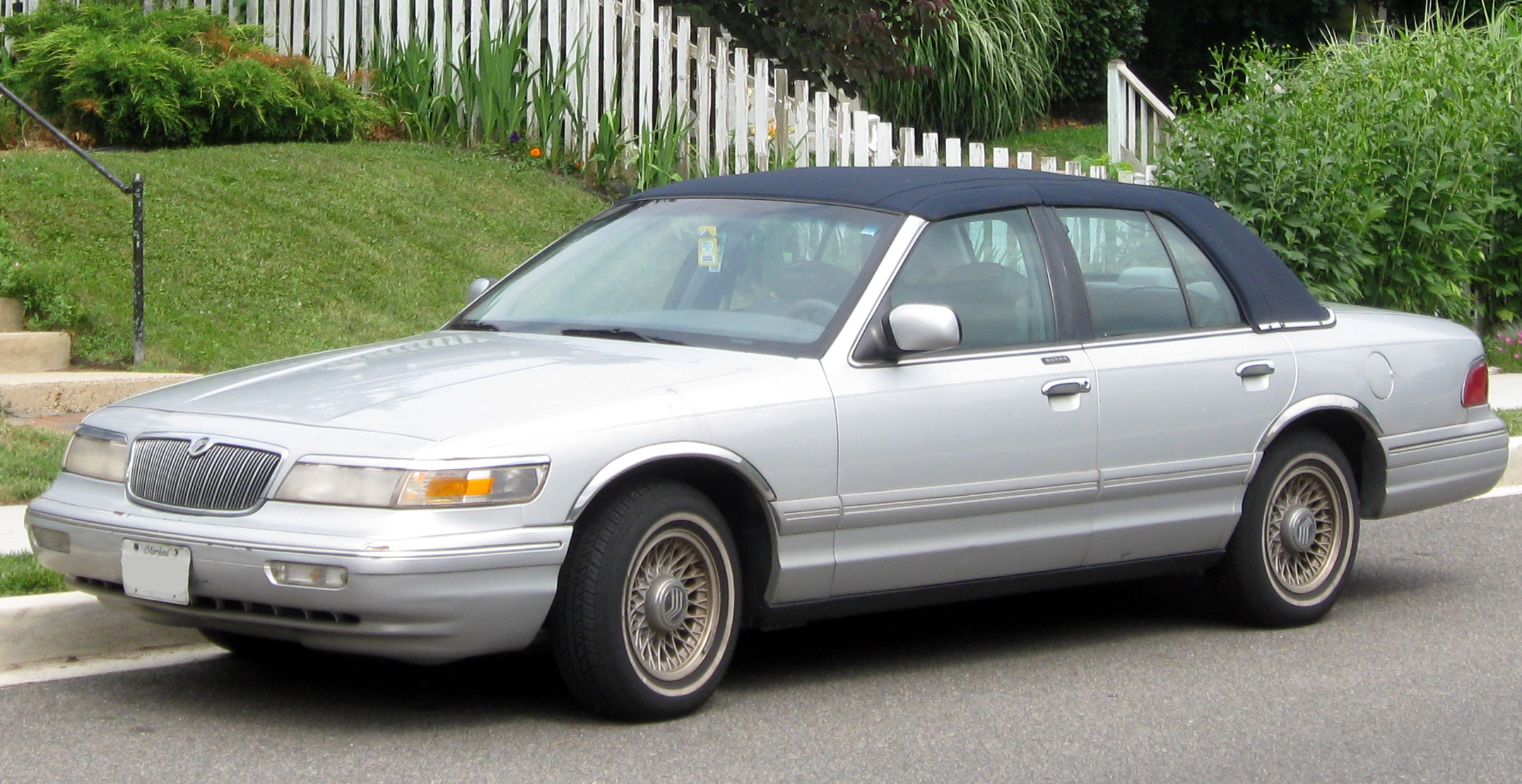
1995–1997 Mercury Grand Marquis (with dealer-installed vinyl roof)

Coinciding with the complete redesign of the body, the second-generation Grand Marquis (alongside its Ford and Lincoln counterparts) debuted the Ford Modular V8 engine family. Replacing the 4.9L and the 5.8L Windsor V8s, the 190hp SOHC 4.6L V8 was the first overhead-cam V8 to appear in an American-market full-size sedan. When specified with dual exhaust, the engine output increased to 210 hp. When not ordered with the trailer-towing package, the 210 hp engine was part of an optional handling package, which included a heavy-duty suspension and a lower-ratio rear axle (3.27 instead of 2.73).

The 4.6L V8 was coupled exclusively to a 4-speed automatic transmission. The hydraulically controlled AOD transmission (in use since 1980) was replaced for 1993 by the electronically controlled AOD-E transmission; for 1995, the AOD-E was replaced by the heavier-duty 4R70W, shared with the Lincoln Mark VIII and Town Car.

Engine name	Years available	Configuration	Horsepower	Torque	Transmission
Ford Modular V8	1992–1997	4.6 L (281 cu in) SOHC 16-valve V8	190 hp (193 PS; 142 kW) (single-exhaust); 210 hp (213 PS; 157 kW) (dual-exhaust; trailer-towing or handling package)	260 lb⋅ft (353 N⋅m); 270 lb⋅ft (366 N⋅m)	Ford AOD 4-speed overdrive automatic (1992) Ford AOD-E 4-speed overdrive automatic (1993–1994) Ford 4R70W 4-speed overdrive automatic (1995–1997)

=== Production ===
While the redesigned 1992 Grand Marquis/Crown Victoria would prove more fuel-efficient than their predecessors, Ford Motor Company used a loophole in CAFE regulations to sell full-size V8 sedans and improve the fuel economy of its entire product line. At the time, CAFE regulations required vehicles with fewer than 75% domestic parts content to be counted as part of an automaker's imported fleet rather than a domestically assembled one.

As Ford retooled its St. Thomas Assembly facility in Ontario during 1991 for the changeover to the 1992 redesign, the company switched a number of its parts suppliers from Canada and the United States to suppliers outside North America (reducing domestic content of the Grand Marquis from approximately 90% to below 75%). The change placed the Grand Marquis alongside the far more fuel-efficient Ford Festiva (imported from South Korea) instead of forcing Ford to potentially balance the model line against the V8-engined Mercury Cougar and Ford Mustang.

After 1996, General Motors discontinued the Buick Roadmaster and Chevrolet Caprice; along with ending full-size station wagon production (in favor of full-size SUVs), GM shifted its full-size sedan range entirely to front-wheel drive. Subsequently, Ford and Lincoln-Mercury was left with a highly profitable market segment to itself. From 1997 onward, the Ford Crown Victoria served as the primary competitor of the Grand Marquis, as it was the only other nameplate featuring the combination of rear-wheel drive, body-on-frame construction, standard V8 engine, and six-passenger seating.

As the 1990s progressed, several automakers began to field competing full-size sedans. For 1994, Chrysler replaced its outdated Imperial and Fifth Avenue and Imperial with the all-new LHS (bucket seats) and New Yorker (front bench seat), becoming the first Chryslers to match the interior dimensions of a full-size Mercury since the 1970s. For 1995, the Toyota Avalon was introduced as an extended-wheelbase version of the Camry; the first Japanese-brand sedan sold with six-passenger seating, the Avalon was a model line developed specifically for North America (and assembled in the United States).

Production figures
Year	1992	1993	1994	1995	1996	1997	Total production
Units	163,262	90,367	107,894	94,202	104,433	127,949	688,107

== Third generation (1998–2002) ==
Third generation (EN114)
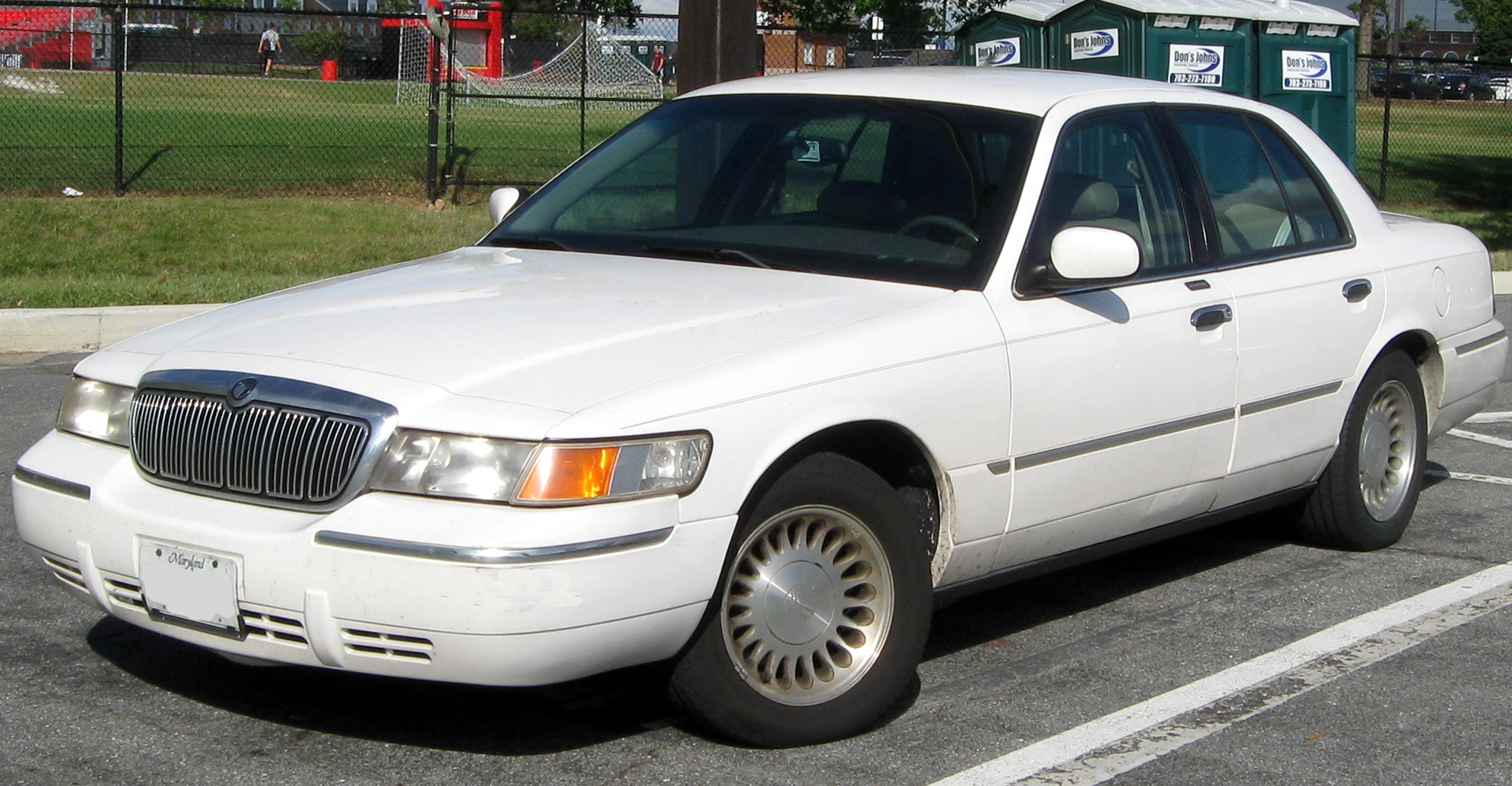

Overview
- Also called: Ford Grand Marquis (Mexico, Venezuela)
- Model years: 1998–2002
- Assembly: Canada: St. Thomas, Ontario (St. Thomas Assembly)

Body and chassis
- Body style: 4-door sedan
- Related: Ford Crown Victoria; Ford Police Interceptor; Lincoln Town Car

Powertrain
- Engine: 4.6 L Modular V8
- Transmission: 4-speed 4R70W automatic

Dimensions
- Wheelbase: 114.7 in (2,913 mm)
- Length: 211.9 in (5,382 mm)
- Width: 78.2 in (1,986 mm)
- Height: 56.8 in (1,443 mm)

The third-generation Grand Marquis went on sale in late 1997 for the 1998 model year with an evolutionary update to the exterior and interior. While the 1992 Crown Victoria was better received in the marketplace than the new-for-1991 Chevrolet Caprice, its exterior design (inspired by the Ford Taurus) was not as popularly accepted as the Grand Marquis. The Grand Marquis outsold the Crown Victoria in 1994 and 1997, despite the latter's police and fleet sales advantage. Ford took note and kept the Grand Marquis' design language in place for 1998 while bringing much of it to the Crown Victoria to pivot away from 1992 to the 1997 "Aero" look.

To streamline production, Ford and Mercury returned to a shared rear roofline between the two model lines, using the formal rear styling of the Grand Marquis; the configuration would remain in use through the end of production in 2011.

With General Motors' full-size B-body vehicles discontinued in 1996 to focus on more profitable SUVs and trucks, the third-generation Grand Marquis primarily competed against its Ford Crown Victoria counterpart. They remained successful, selling over 100,000 units per year.

=== Chassis specification ===
The third-generation Grand Marquis retained the Panther chassis from its predecessors, lengthened in wheelbase to 114.7 inches. To upgrade handling stability, the triangulated four-link rear axle (in use on large Fords since 1965) was replaced by a four-link rear axle with a Watt's linkage, though a solid rear axle was retained. To improve braking, the four-wheel disc brakes were given dual-piston calipers for the front rotors, requiring 16-inch wheels. ABS was initially standard for 1998, then became optional in 2001, and again became standard in 2002. The traction control (which remained an option) was revised to work at any speed (rather than only low speeds).

==== Powertrain ====
The third-generation Grand Marquis retained the same powertrain as the 1995–1997 Grand Marquis, with a 4.6 L Modular V8 and a four-speed 4R70W automatic transmission. In a minor revision, several under-hood components were relocated, with the power steering reservoir attached to the engine and the coolant overflow reservoir relocated onto the radiator (both were located on a fender). In another change, the engine was converted to coil-on-plug ignition along with fail-safe cooling using a dual-speed electric fan.

For 1998, the standard-equipment V8 (with single exhaust) was increased in output to 200 hp (149 kW; 203 PS) (from 190). The handling suspension package continued in production, paired with the dual-exhaust version of the 4.6 L V8, producing 215 hp (160 kW; 218 PS). For 2001, the engine received redesigned cylinder heads and a new intake manifold called "Performance Improved" (P.I.), which increased horsepower to 220 and 235 hp (164 and 175 kW; 223 and 238 PS), respectively.

A 2.73 rear-axle ratio was paired with single-exhaust engines; a numerically higher rear-axle ratio was used as part of the handling package. For 2000 and early 2001, a 3.55 rear axle was used; other versions used a 3.27 rear axle.

=== Variants ===
==== Handling & Performance Package ====
Carried over from the second generation, the Handling & Performance Package was initially available on both GS and LS trims. The package included sport-tuned front shocks and springs; larger front and rear sway bars; a heavy-duty rear suspension with air springs; shorter rear gearing for better off-the-line acceleration; a higher stall 11.25-inch torque converter (2000–mid 2001 only); dual exhaust; auxiliary oil-to-air coolers for the power steering and transmission; sport-tuned steering; and lace-spoke 16-inch wheels. In 2002, the package was restricted to LS models only.

==== Grand Marquis LSE ====
At the 2001 Chicago Auto Show, Mercury introduced a new trim package for the Grand Marquis named LSE. Using the basis of both the LS trim and the Handling & Performance Package, the LSE added five-passenger seating with front bucket seats, a floor-mounted shifter, and a center console. The center console featured a large storage bin with a cigar lighter, dual cup holders, and a padded armrest. Options on the LS, such as a leather-wrapped steering wheel with temperature and audio controls, electronic climate controls (EATC), and dual 8-way power seats, were standard on the LSE. In addition to these features, the LSE included all mechanical upgrades found on the Handling & Performance Package and used the same lace-spoke 16-inch wheels on P225/60TR16 tires.

According to Mercury, the LSE offered a compelling balance of performance and comfort. It was introduced to the lineup to boost consumer interest in the model and went on sale beginning midyear 2001. For the 2001 model year, the base price of the LSE was US$28,295.

All LSEs are Grand Marquis LS models according to their VIN and are badged as such. LSEs did not have a separate VIN designation. The LSE name was only found on the front carpet mats included from the factory.

=== Body design and interior ===
While strongly resembling the previous generation, the 1998 Grand Marquis shared only the roof stamping and doors from its 1997 predecessor. Designers revised the front and rear bumpers, squaring off their design. The exterior trim was simplified, with the chrome trim removed above the headlamps. The rear fascia resembles the Crown Victoria but uses a red lens panel between the taillights. The grille was restyled slightly as a larger version of the 1995-1997 design.

The interior was mostly carried over from the 1995 update, with a two-spoke steering wheel replacing the previous four-spoke design. Seats were freshened with slightly revised designs, and the chrome trim was deleted from the column-mounted gear shifter and the turn signal lever. The interior backlighting was switched from light blue to green, and the gauge cluster needles, which were previously orange, were now red. In 2000, several federally mandated features were added to the interior: an emergency release handle inside the trunk, LATCH anchors, and a "Belt Minder" (chime that sounds when an occupant is not belted in). New seat belt designs became standard in 2001 as part of the addition of Mercury's Personal Safety System, which also included dual-stage airbags and seat position sensors. Additionally, for 2001, redundant steering wheel controls for both the climate control and radio became available as optional equipment on LS models. Lastly, a wood-grain steering wheel, similar to that found on the Town Car, became available as an option in 2001.

Engine name	Configuration	Years available	Output		Transmission
Engine name	Configuration	Years available	Horsepower	Torque	Transmission
Ford Modular V8	4.6 L (281 cu in) SOHC 16-valve V8	1998–2000	200 hp (203 PS; 149 kW) (single exhaust) 215 hp (218 PS; 160 kW) (dual exhaust; handling package)	265 lb⋅ft (359 N⋅m) 285 lb⋅ft (386 N⋅m)	Ford 4R70W 4-speed overdrive automatic
Ford Modular V8	4.6 L (281 cu in) SOHC 16-valve V8	2001–2002	220 hp (223 PS; 164 kW) (single exhaust) 235 hp (238 PS; 175 kW) (dual-exhaust; handling package/LSE)	265 lb⋅ft (359 N⋅m) 275 lb⋅ft (373 N⋅m)	Ford 4R70W 4-speed overdrive automatic
Ford Modular V8	4.6 L (281 cu in) SOHC 16-valve V8	1998–2002	221 hp (224 PS; 165 kW) (dual exhaust; GCC export)	304 lb⋅ft (412 N⋅m)	Ford 4R70W 4-speed overdrive automatic

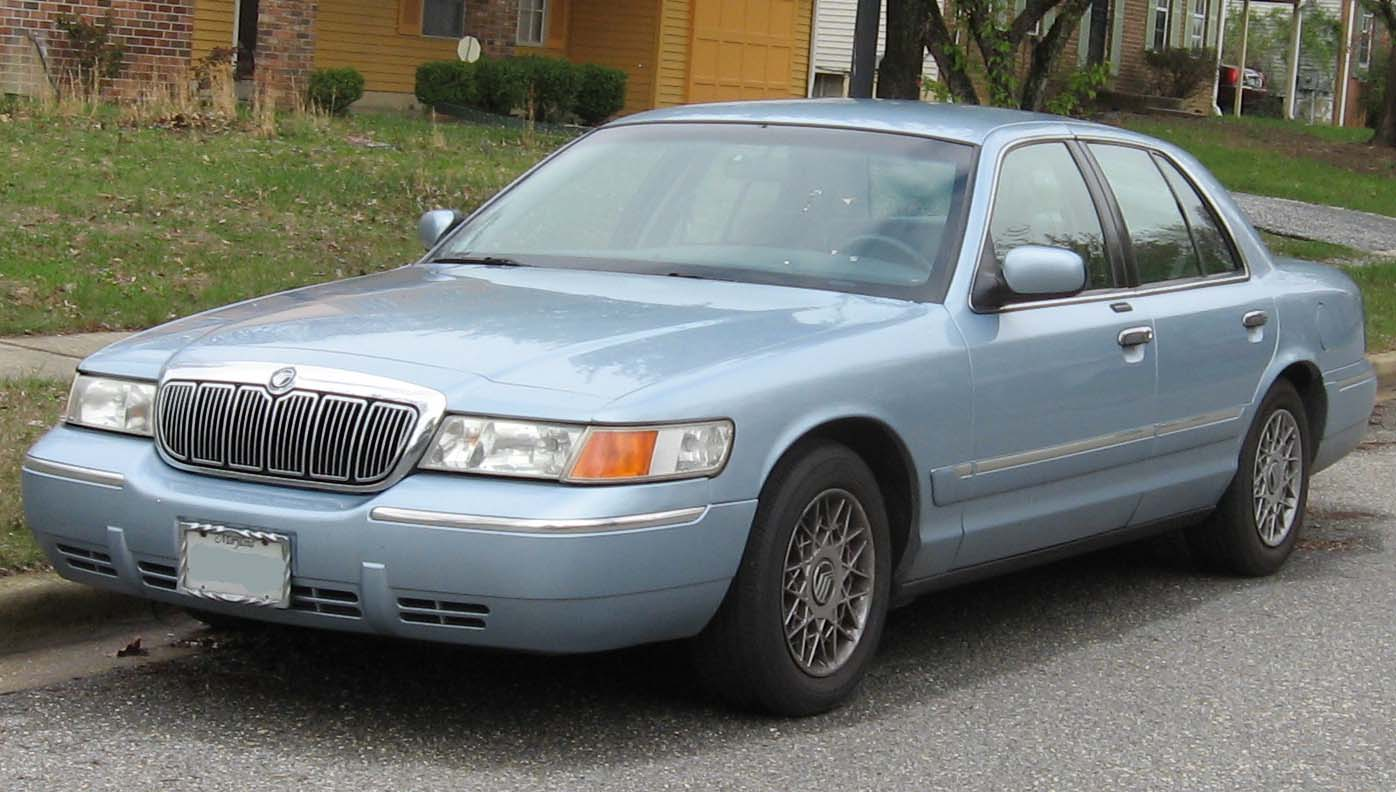
1998–2002 Mercury Grand Marquis GS

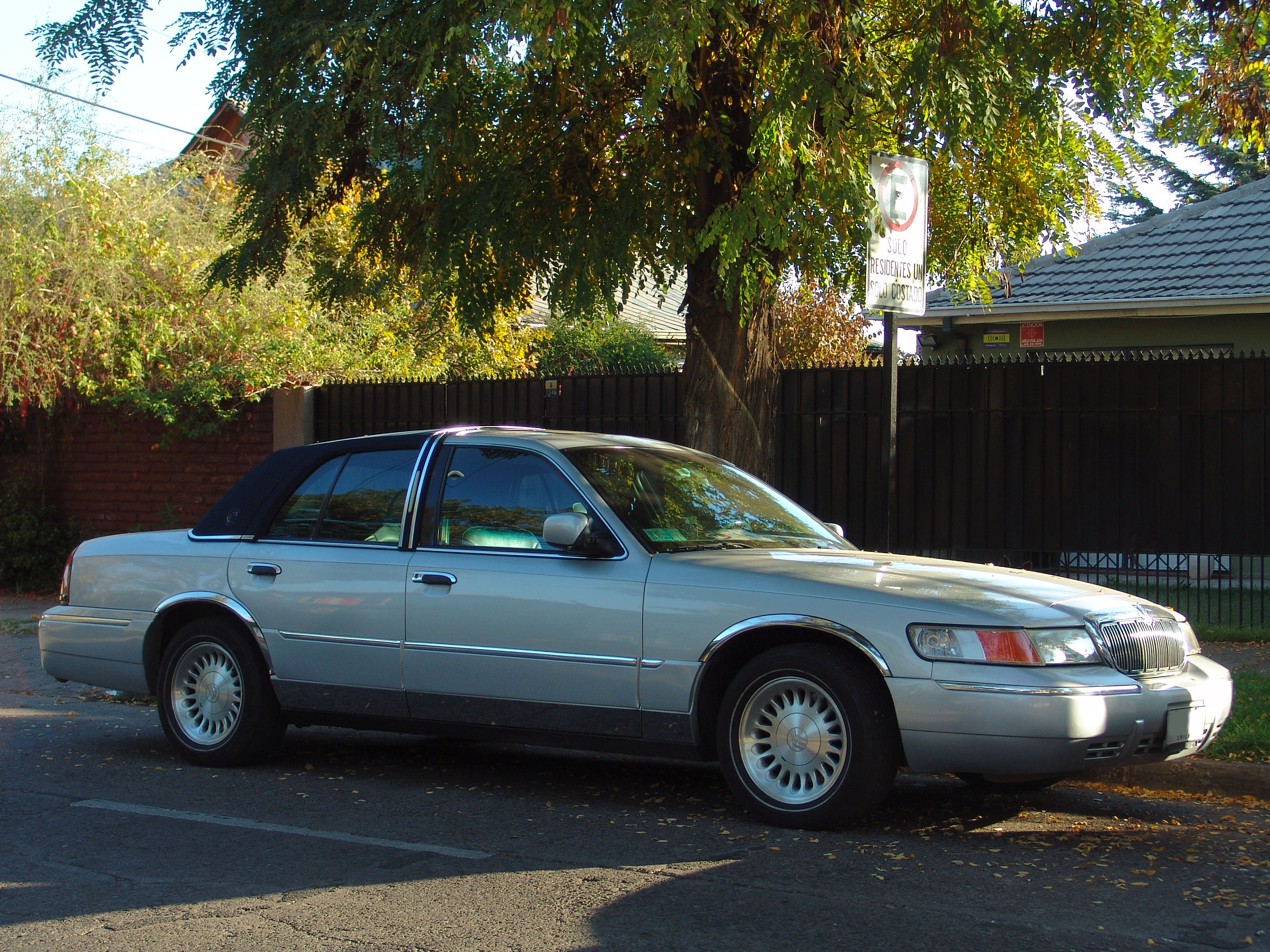
1998 Mercury Grand Marquis LS Brougham (dealer-installed option package)

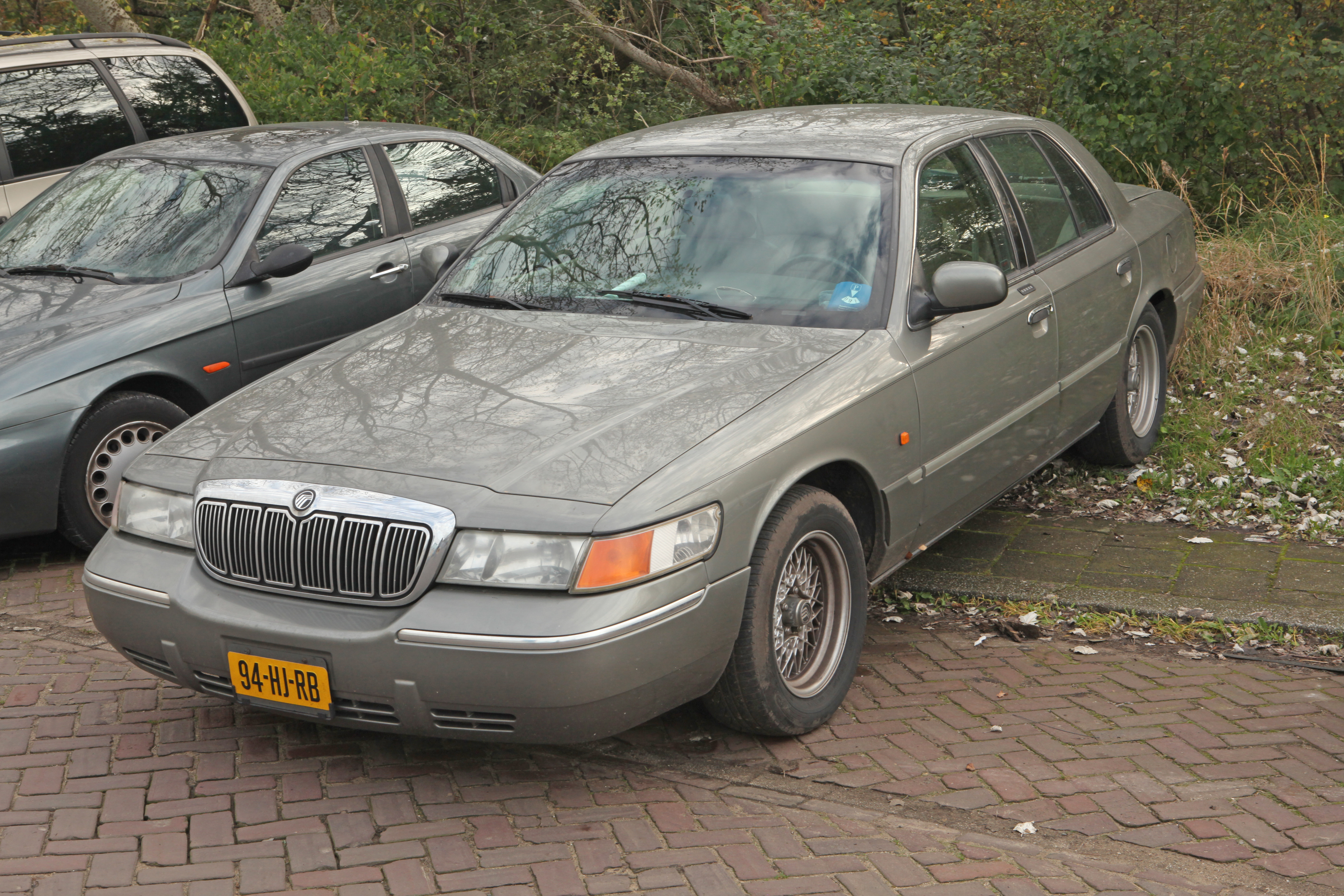
2001 Ford Grand Marquis (export)

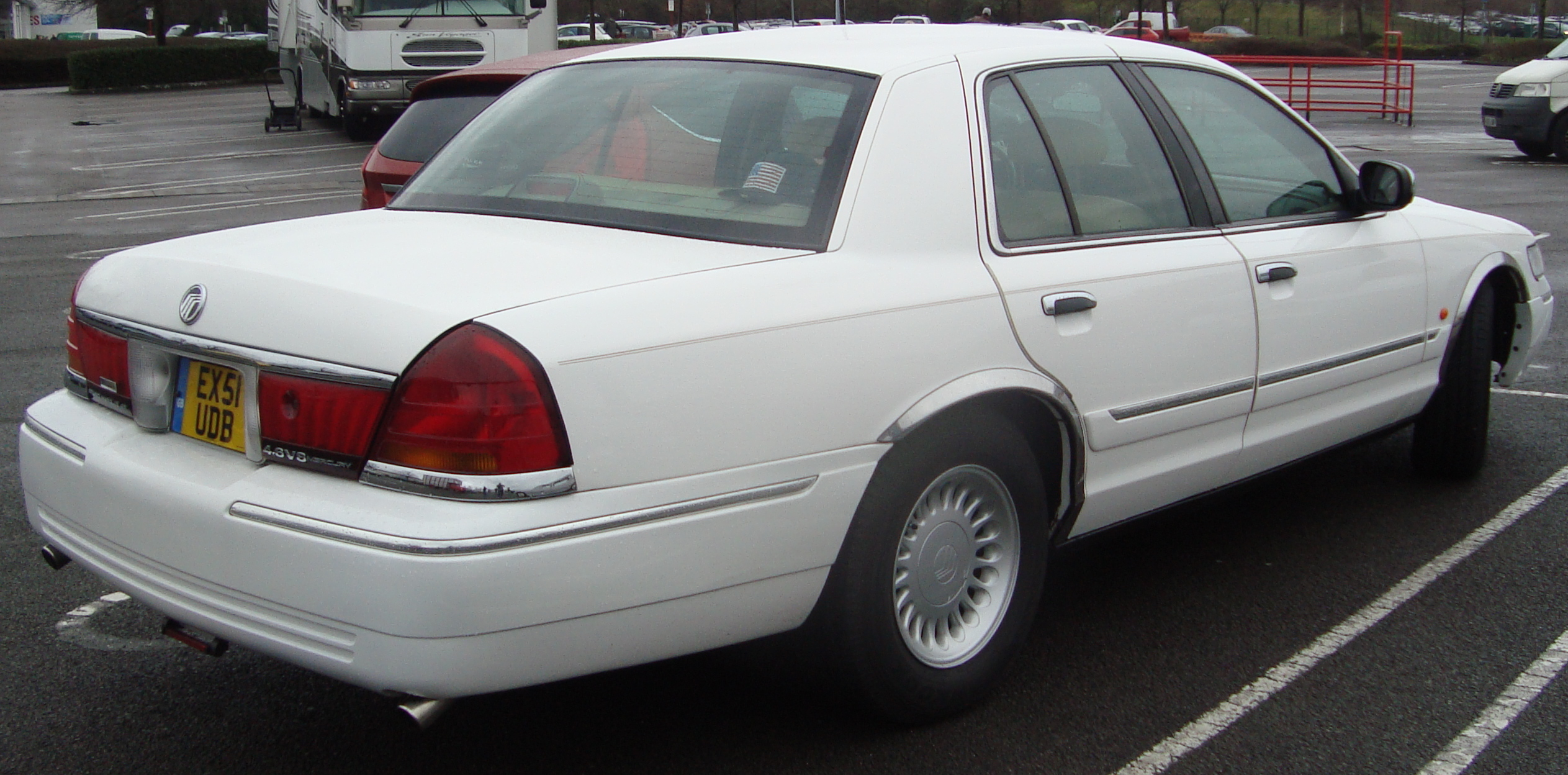
Rear view, 2001 Mercury Grand Marquis LS

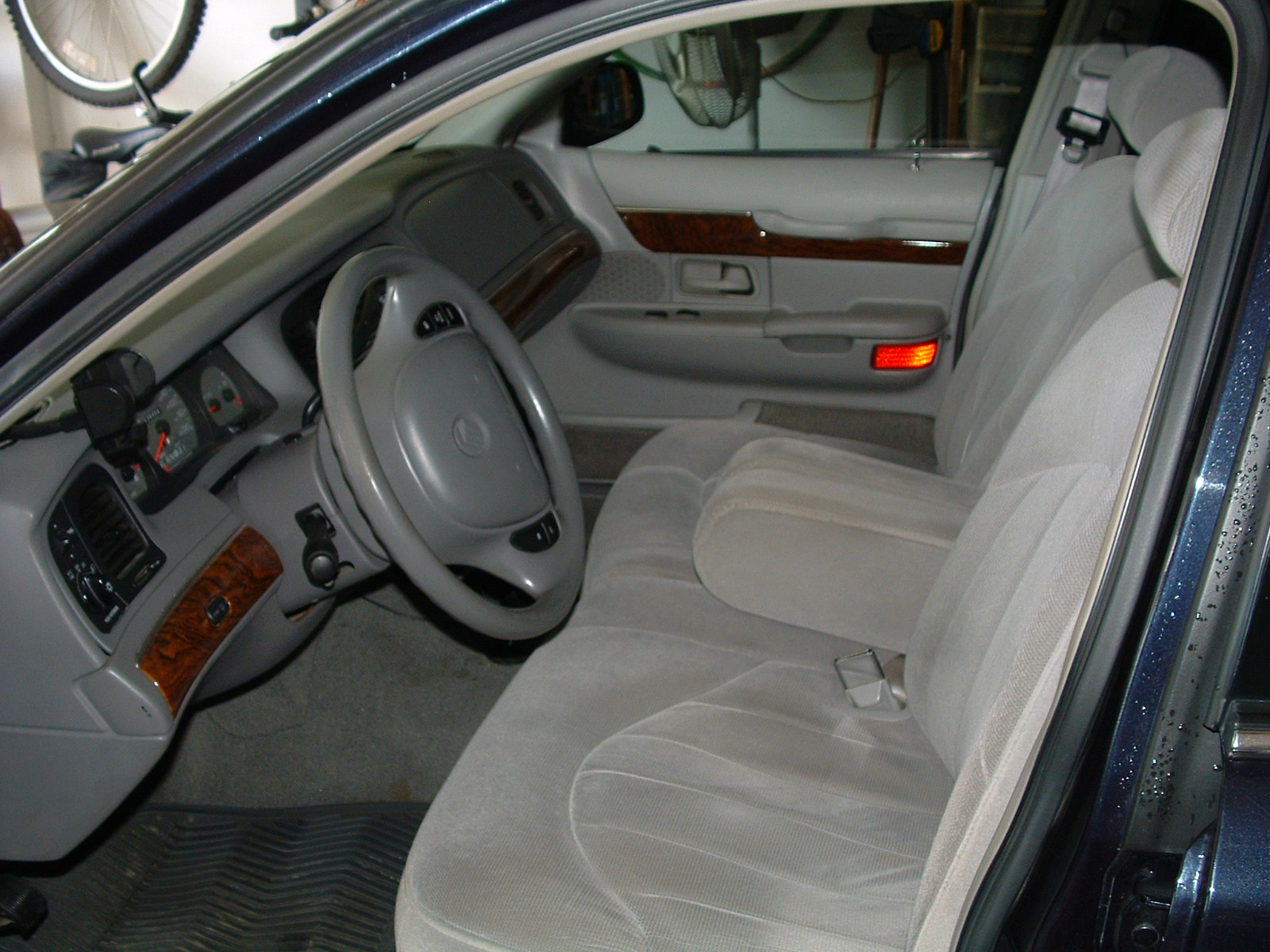
Front seat, 1998–2002 Mercury Grand Marquis

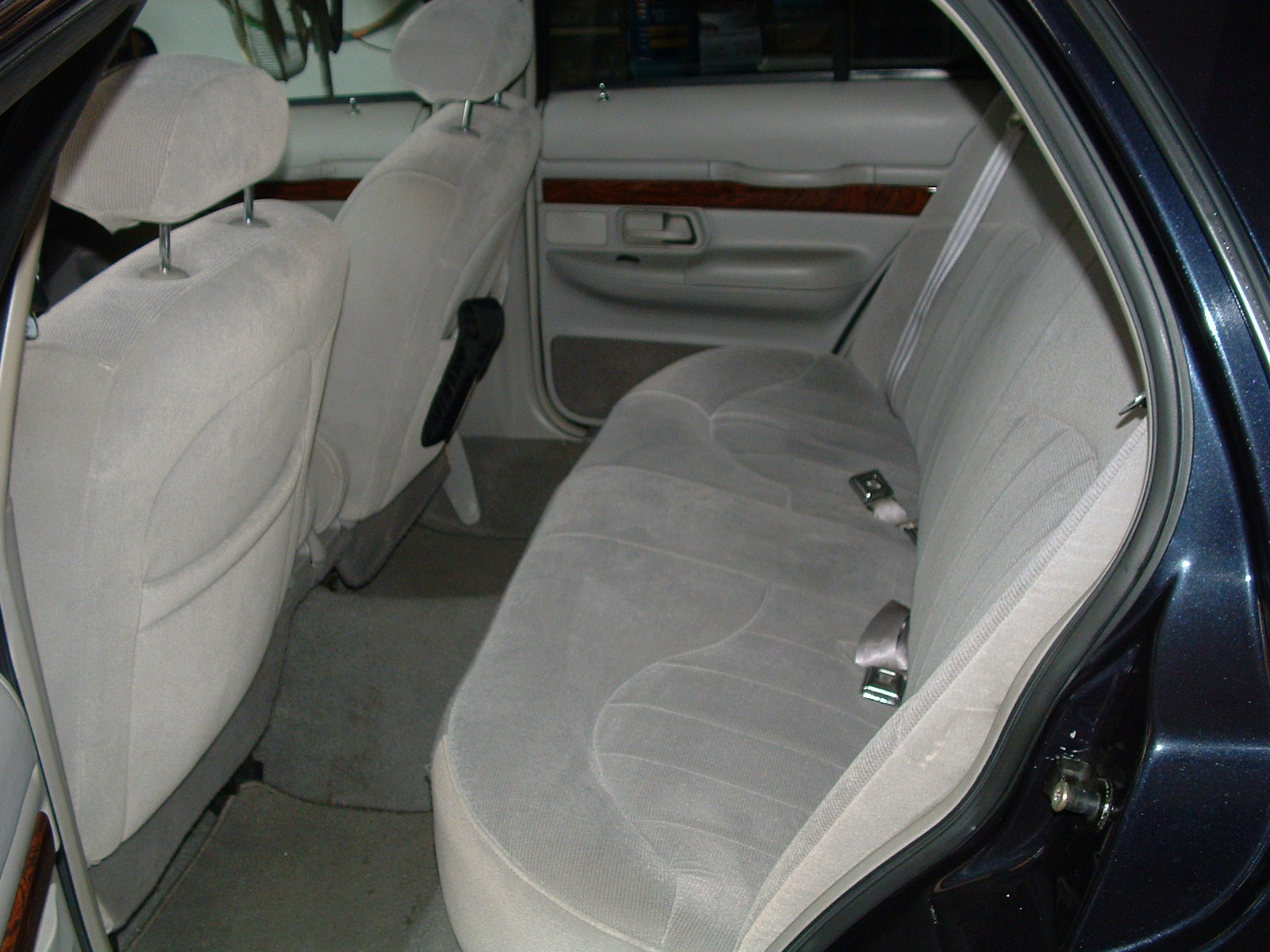
Rear seat, 1998–2002 Mercury Grand Marquis

Production figures
Year	1998	1999	2000	2001	2002	Total production
Units	134,155	142,372	132,870	100,774	96,034	606,206

== Fourth generation (2003–2011) ==
Fourth generation
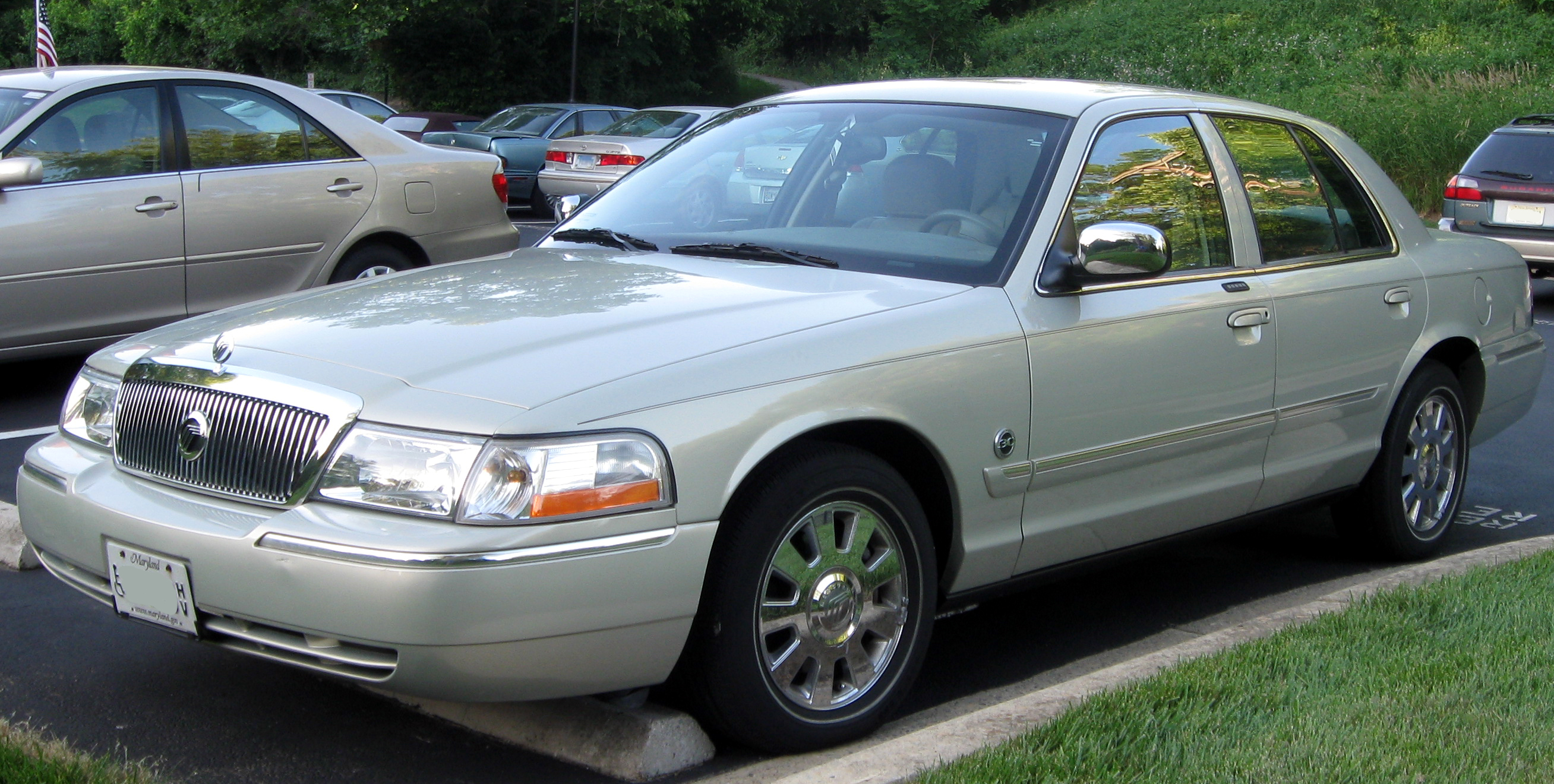
- 2005 Mercury Grand Marquis (30th Anniversary Edition)

Overview
- Also called: Ford Grand Marquis (Mexico)
- Production: March 26, 2002–January 4, 2011
- Model years: 2003–2011
- Assembly: Canada: St. Thomas, Ontario (St. Thomas Assembly)

Body and chassis
- Body style: 4-door sedan
- Related: Mercury Marauder; Ford Crown Victoria; Ford Police Interceptor; Lincoln Town Car

Powertrain
- Engine: 4.6 L Modular V8
- Transmission: 4-speed 4R70W automatic (2003–2004); 4-speed 4R70E automatic (2005); 4-speed 4R75E automatic (2006–2011)

Dimensions
- Wheelbase: 2003–2008: 114.7 in (2,913 mm); 2009–2011: 114.6 in (2,911 mm); 120.7 in (3,066 mm) (GSL)
- Length: 211.9 in (5,382 mm) (1998–2005); 212.0 in (5,385 mm) (2006–2011); 220.0 in (5,588 mm) (GSL)
- Width: 78.2 in (1,986 mm) (1998–2008); 78.3 in (1,989 mm) (2009–2011)
- Height: 56.8 in (1,443 mm) (1998–2008); 56.3 in (1,430 mm) (2009–2011)
- Curb weight: 4,118–4,137 pounds (1,868–1,877 kg)

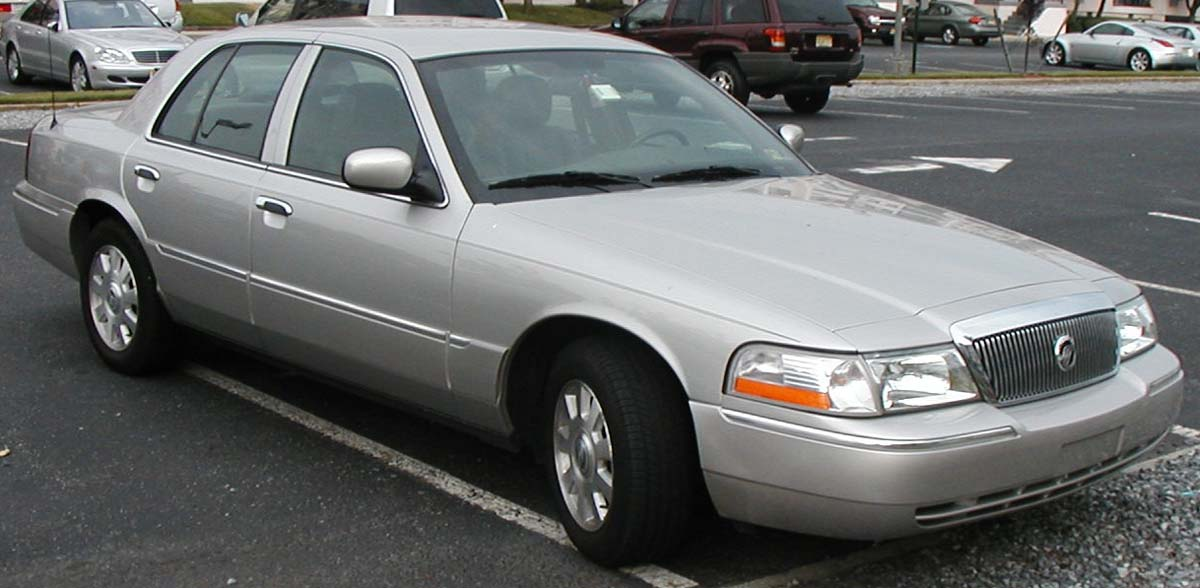
2005 Mercury Grand Marquis

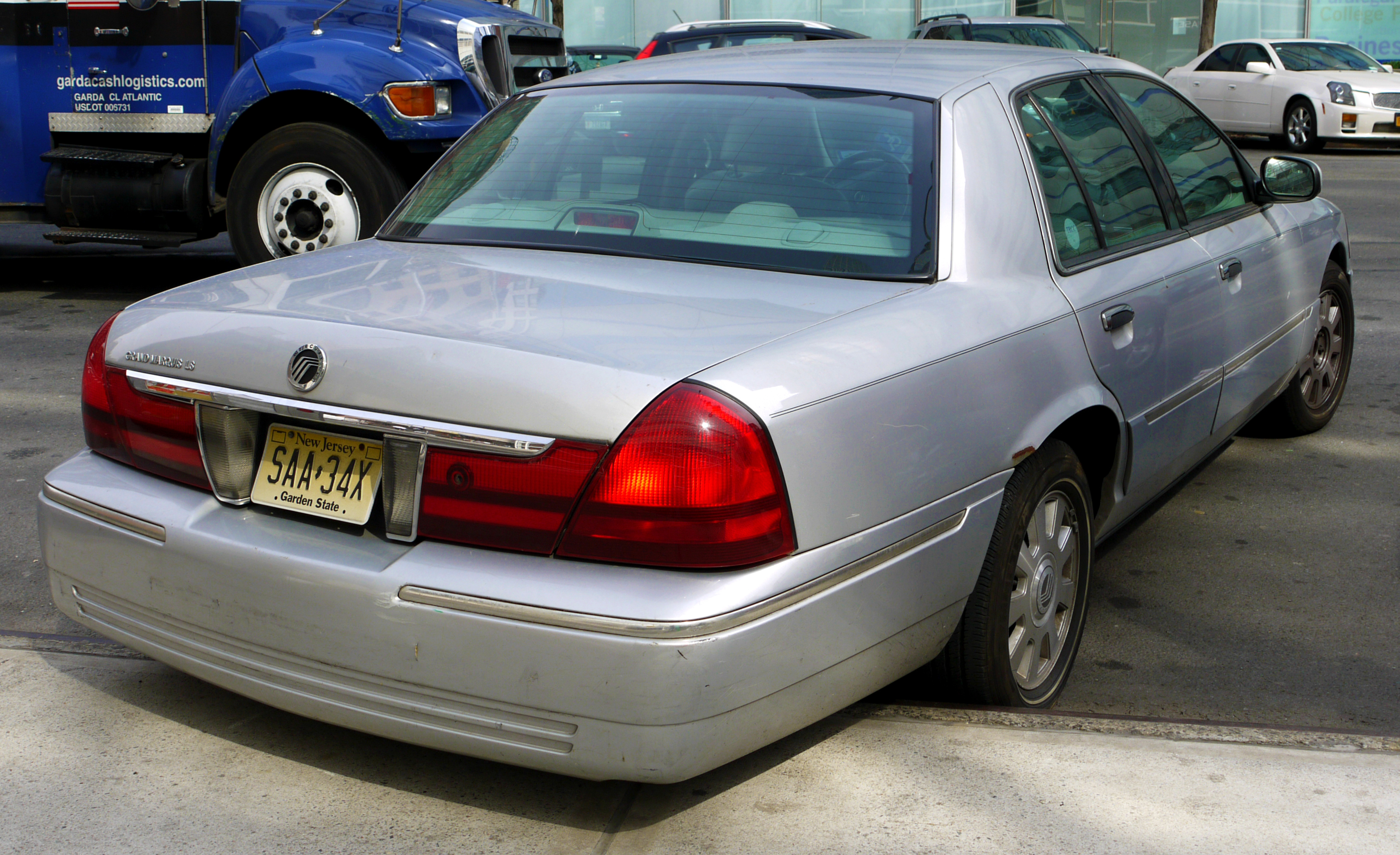
2003–2005 Mercury Grand Marquis

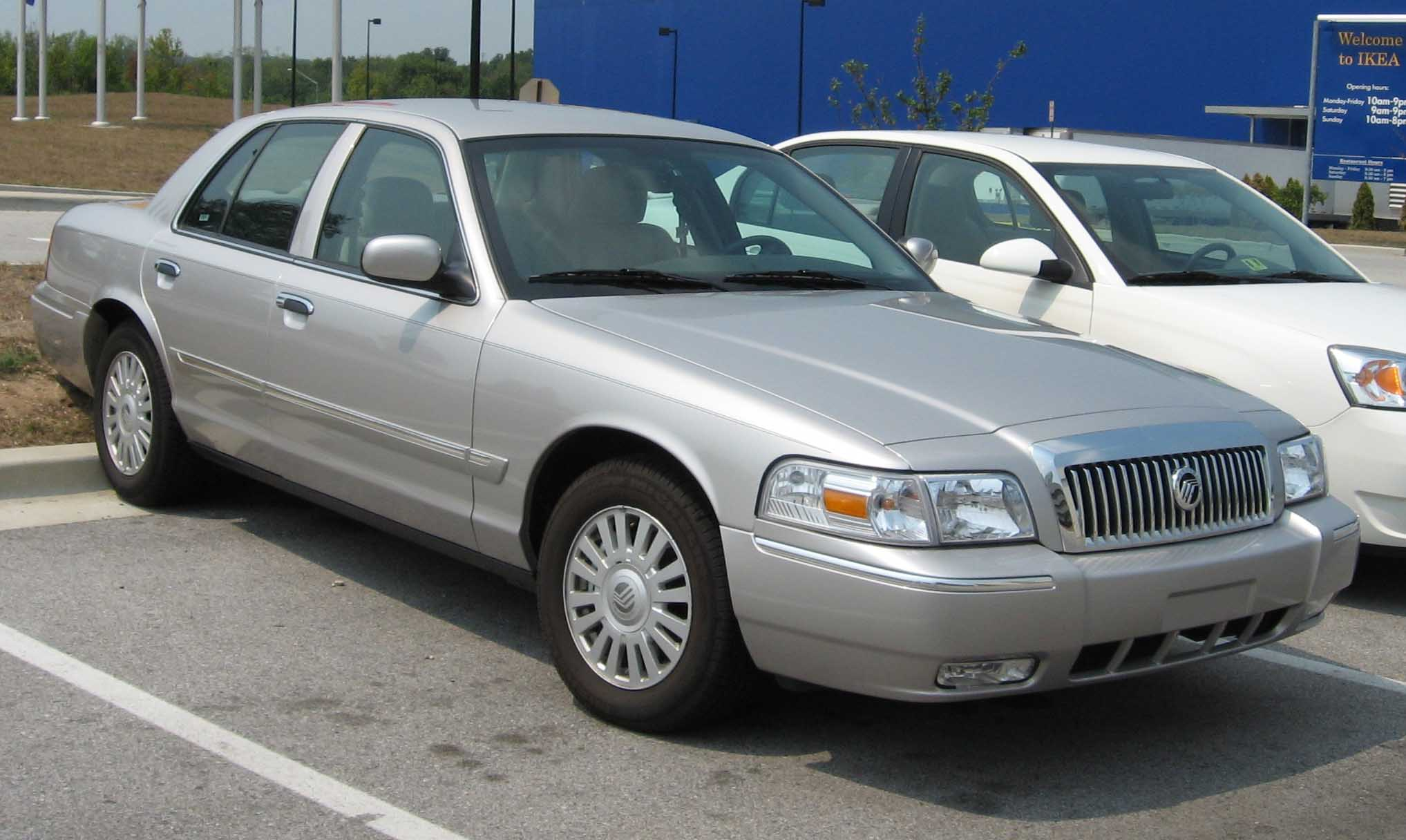
2006–2007 Mercury Grand Marquis LS

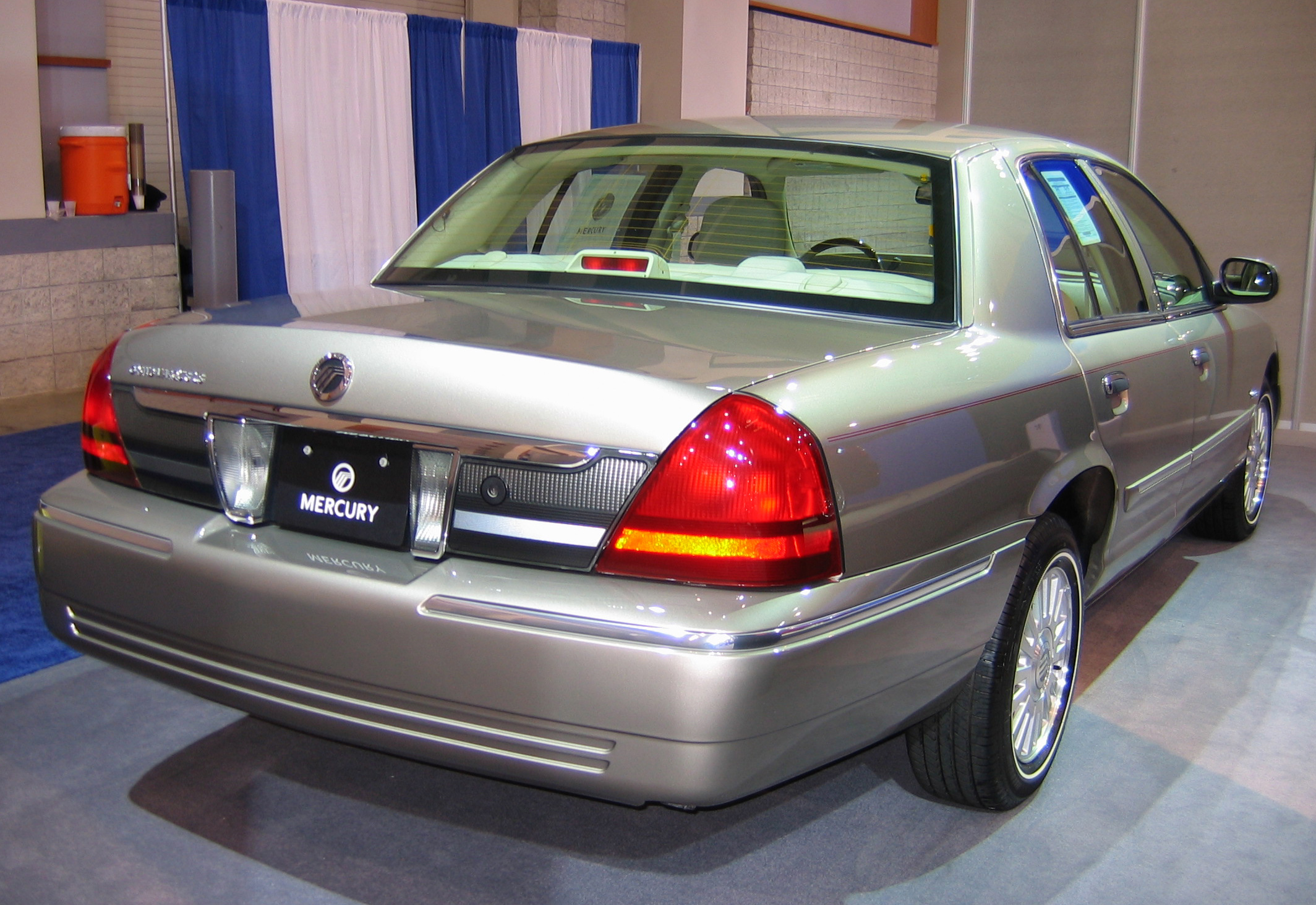
2006 Mercury Grand Marquis LS

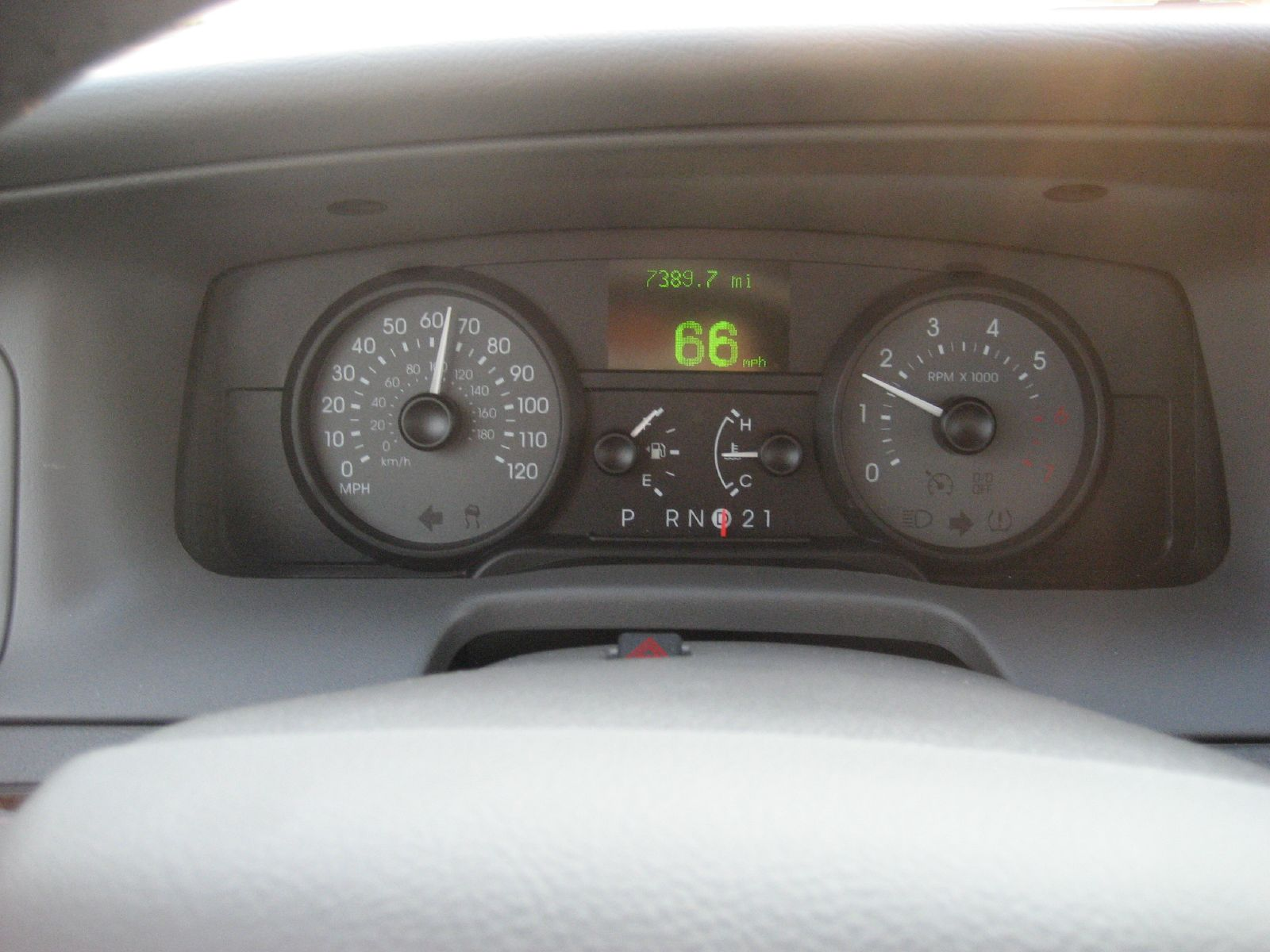
2006–2011 Mercury Grand Marquis instrument panel

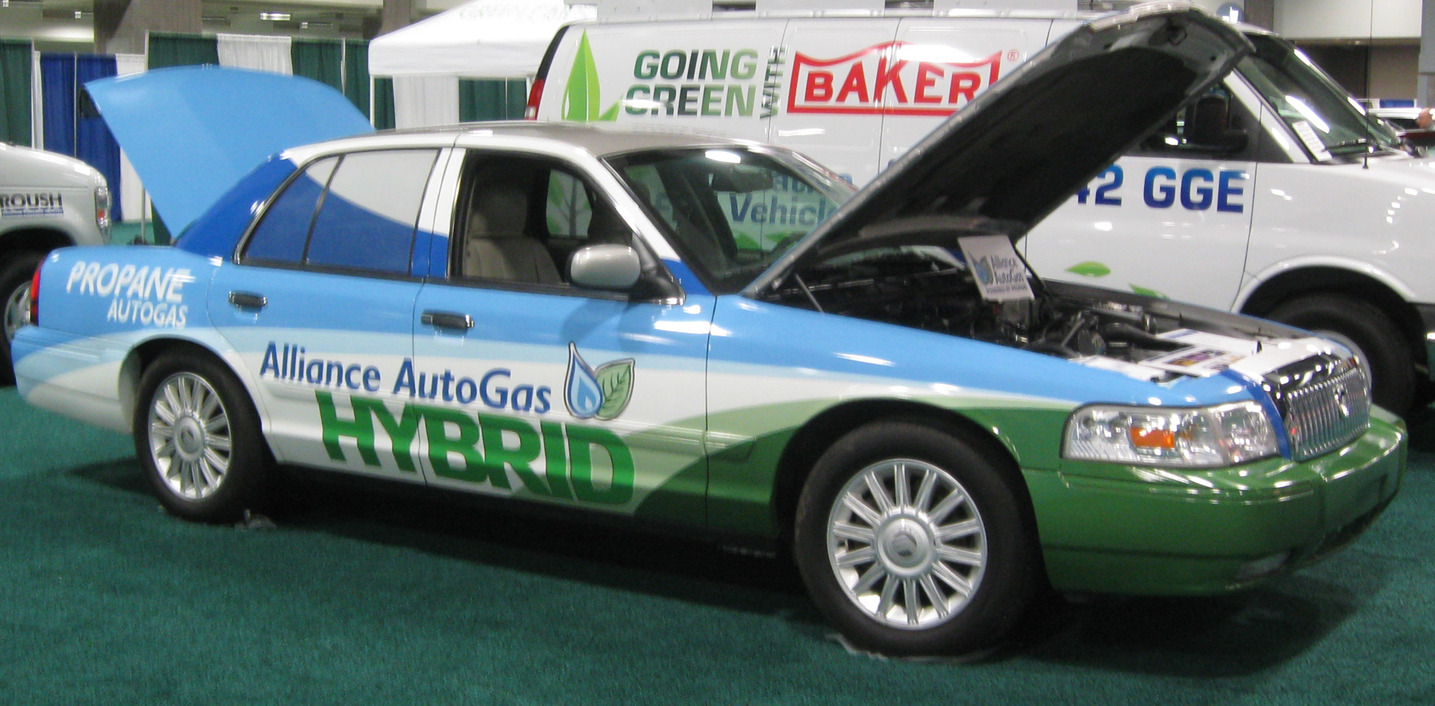
2011 Mercury Grand Marquis. This vehicle was converted to run on propane.

For 2003, the Grand Marquis received mechanical, exterior, and interior styling updates (along with the Ford Crown Victoria, and Lincoln Town Car). The Panther chassis was redesigned. In the retail market, the Grand Marquis replaced the Ford Crown Victoria, which became available only for fleet sales beginning in 2008. During the 2000s, Mercury would introduce two additional full-size sedans: the revived Mercury Marauder, an equipment variant of the Grand Marquis, and the Mercury Montego (rebranded the 2008-2009 Mercury Sable).

=== Exterior ===
Styling revisions extended to bumper fascias, waterfall-style grille, headlamps and side markers, frame-less windshield wipers, and rear fascia. An optional Grand Marquis LS Limited Edition trim level featured a hood ornament and two-tone paint.

=== Chassis and powertrain ===
A revised frame featured hydro-formed frame rails, an aluminum #2 cross-member, and was now fully boxed. According to Mercury, the new frame was 20% more resistant to vertical bending. Coil-over front shocks were adopted, with revised steering knuckles, revised upper control arms, and new aluminum lower control arms. In the rear, mono-tube shocks were introduced; they were also inverted and mounted outside the frame rails. The new suspension required that Mercury change the wheel designs to those with a high-positive offset. A quiet EBD booster with a mechanical panic assist system was added, improving front-rear brake bias. An electronic variable assist rack and pinion power steering replaced the previous recirculating ball system; the new steering unit was also speed-sensitive and 22.5 pounds lighter than the previous configuration. The exhaust system was re-designed with frame-mounted hangers.

The 4.6L V8 engine and the 4R70W four-speed automatic transmission were carried over. The engine featured a knock sensor and revised tuning, rated at 224 hp (167 kW; 227 PS) with a single exhaust system and at 239 hp (178 kW; 242 PS) with dual exhaust. Horsepower and torque ratings would remain the same through to the end of production in 2011. The oil pan was enlarged by 20% to six quarts. Other changes included a re-designed intake manifold with an aluminum water crossover, and an electronic return-less fuel system with a revised EGR setup. The updated engine was distinguished by a redesigned engine cover, featuring a silver "V8" emblem; the oil filler cap was moved to the passenger-side valve cover, and the power steering fluid reservoir was relocated from the timing cover to the radiator shroud. A new and improved variable-speed electronic radiator fan replaced the outgoing two-speed unit.

=== Interior ===
The redesigned Grand Marquis featured updated door panels and redesigned controls, but retained the previous dashboard, which had been used since 1995. Seats featured revised upholstery and larger front headrests. A new dual media (cassette/CD) radio was initially standard, and became optional midway through the 2003 model year. Wiper-activated headlights were now standard. A shoulder belt was added for the rear middle passenger along with second-generation rear child seat anchors, and side airbags were introduced as an option; they became standard for 2009.

=== Trim ===
As part of the redesign, Mercury revised available trims for 2003. The Grand Marquis was expanded to four instead of the traditional two-model line. In addition to the base-trim GS, there was now GS Convenience, LS Premium, and LS Ultimate.

GS models included six-passenger seating with an 8-way power driver seat, an AM/FM/CD/Cassette radio (deleted in favor of a cassette-only unit in mid-2003, then a single CD player beginning in 2005), manual temperature controls, power mirrors, heated mirrors (2003 only), power locks and windows, cruise control, Mercury's SecuriLock passive anti-theft system (PATS), and Mercury's Personal Safety System. Freestanding options available on the base GS were limited to heated mirrors (2004–08), an AM/FM/CD radio (mid-2003-04), chromed wheel covers (2004–07, standard for 08), rear air suspension (2007–08), and two-tone paint.

Over the standard GS, the GS Convenience added all-speed traction control, power-adjustable pedals, rear reading lamps, body-side paint stripes, and Ford's proprietary door-mounted keypad system, marketed as Securicode. Additionally, several free-standing options were available on the GS Convenience: leather seating, a full-size spare tire, chromed wheel covers (2004–06), heated mirrors (2004-06), and a trunk organizer. A GS Convenience Two-Tone Edition was offered from 2005 to 2006. Aside from two-tone paint, it included pinstripes, body-colored side moldings, unique scuff plates & C-pillar badging, chromed wheel covers, a hood ornament, and body-colored door handles. Interior features of this package included leather-trimmed seating with the Mercury logo stitched into the front seat-backs. Following the 2006 model year, the GS Convenience was dropped from the lineup. Many of its standard features and free-standing options were made available on the base GS through packages such as the GS Comfort Appearance Package (included leather-trimmed seats and 16-inch aluminum wheels), as well as the GS Confidence Package (included traction control, heated mirrors, and fog lamps).

LS Premium models added aluminum wheels, wide body-side moldings with bright inserts, an 8-way power passenger seat (this would later become optional), an auto-dimming rear-view mirror, electronic automatic temperature control (EATC), a leather-wrapped steering wheel, an overhead console, and an instrument cluster with a digital message center (2006-2011). Freestanding options available on the LS Premium included a six-disc CD changer radio with a subwoofer (an Audiophile unit on 2005 and newer models), chromed aluminum wheels, LSE package (later replaced by the Handling package), heated front seats, leather-trimmed seats, side airbags, heated mirrors (made standard again for 2006), and PPG laminated side windows (2004–05). Following the 2006 model year, the LS Premium was renamed back to LS.

The range-topping LS Ultimate added rear-air suspension with a rear stabilizer bar, "Ultimate" fender badging, standard leather seating, an AM/FM/CD/Cassette player (AM/FM/CD radio on later models), a fully digital gauge cluster (2003–05), and a steering wheel with redundant controls. In addition to the options on the LS Premium, the Ultimate offered an optional wood-grain steering wheel. The LS Ultimate would not be available for 2008, but returned for 2009.

The LSE was not a separate trim version, but a package for LS Premium models. It replaced the Handling and Performance Package available on the third-generation model. The LSE offered five-passenger seating with leather, dual power bucket seats, a center console, and a floor shifter. Mechanically, the LSE had a larger front sway bar & rear sway bar, power steering & transmission coolers, uniquely tuned rear air springs, dual exhaust, a 3.27:1 rear axle ratio, and a 16x7 inch "snowflake" wheel design similar to those on the 2003-2005 Crown Victoria LX Handling and Performance Package (HPP); the difference being that the LSE's wheel pockets were painted grey versus HPP's machined wheel pockets. The 2003 LSE was short-lived for the U.S. market, as its production ended in December 2002. However, a limited number of LSEs continued to be produced for the Canadian market in 2003 and 2004; it briefly returned to the U.S. market for 2005.

From 2003 to 2005, a Limited Edition version of the LS model was sold. This included an appearance package with chromed mirrors, body-colored door handles, and a two-tone leather interior. Limited Edition models also came with side airbags standard. They included a Mercury badge hood ornament, making its return for the first time since 1991.

From 2006 to 2007, a Handling package was offered on the LS trim. It was a direct replacement for the outgoing LSE package and included all of its features except for a new nine-spoke machined 16x7-inch wheel design shared with the 2006-07 Crown Victoria LX HPP and six-passenger bench seating.

For 2007 and 2008 LS models, a Palm Beach trim option was available; it consisted primarily of unique upholstery and badging.

Following the introduction of a "No-Stock" marketing guideline by Lincoln-Mercury, the Grand Marquis trim line underwent a revision for 2009. Aside from long-wheelbase GCC export models, the GS was dropped, while the LS was split into two series: LS Fleet and LS Retail. The former was available exclusively for fleet purchase in the United States, while the latter was available only by dealer special order to minimize unsold inventory of cars. Moreover, incentives such as $4,000 per vehicle were added to remove previous stock from dealer lots. After Ford announced the discontinuation of the Mercury brand in June 2010, all 2011 cars were Mercury Grand Marquis LS Ultimate Editions.

==== 2003 mid-year de-contenting ====
Midway through the 2003 model year, Ford introduced production changes for the Grand Marquis (and all Panther platform vehicles) to reduce production costs by approximately $4,000,000 annually. Vehicles built after December 2002 no longer included a remote-release fuel door (introduced in 1992), black B-pillars (switched to body-color paint), map pockets on the front seats, an instrument panel digital clock (a feature integrated into the radio on other Ford vehicles), a standard dual-media radio (CD/cassette), automatic parking brake release, foam sound insulating strips inside the headliner, silver V8 emblem on the engine "beauty cover", under-hood bulb, or an air intake sound resonator. Furthermore, the Grand Marquis no longer included a rear sway bar except for LS Ultimate or vehicles with the Handling Package. The five-passenger LSE package was discontinued for the U.S. market. Several colors were dropped from the model line, including Deep Wedgwood Blue, Matador Red Metallic, Gold Ash Metallic, Aspen Green Metallic, Silver Frost Metallic, and Chestnut Clearcoat Metallic.

For 2004, laminated safety glass became an option, and GS-trim vehicles featured a new wheel cover design.

For the 2005 model year, an all-new steering wheel design was introduced (for the first time since 1998), and the Grand Marquis offered a fully digital instrument cluster as an option for the last time. For LS-trim vehicles, an Audiophile six-disc in-dash CD changer was provided as an option (similar to the Montego and sourced from the Lincoln Town Car). The LSE package made a return; however, only 533 examples were produced. Due to a supply chain issue, the radio antenna was removed from the rear windshield and placed on the rear fender (it would return to the rear window for 2006). Minor deletions included the removal of illuminated vanity mirrors for GS-trim vehicles and deleting "Grand Marquis" insignia on the center of the dash trim. In a functional change, drive-by-wire throttle control was introduced, and the cruise control function to the engine computer itself was relocated above the driver-side inner fender. A sound resonator was returned to the air intake, featuring a 70mm mass airflow sensor. The four-speed transmission, now designated the 4R70E, received upgraded electronics. Updated crash severity sensors and a front-passenger weight sensor were introduced, allowing the restraint system to enable or disable the front passenger airbag as needed automatically.

=== 2006 update and later years ===
For 2006, the Grand Marquis received the final styling update of any Ford Panther-platform vehicle. An all-new front fascia was fitted with a rectangular grille (similar to the 1988-91 Grand Marquis); for the first time, fog lamps were offered as an option. The rear fascia adopted a dark grey applique between the tail lamps.

The instrument panel received a revised gauge package with a tachometer. On LS models, the new instrument panel consolidated many features previously used by the overhead console into a message center, allowing the driver to perform a system check, view/reset oil life, distance to empty, average/instant fuel economy, and trip time. Revisions featured a redundant digital speedometer and a built-in compass. The LSE package was replaced by the optional Handling Package for the LS trim, which retained the previous chassis upgrades (but not the 5-passenger seating configuration); the Handling Package also featured a new alloy wheel design. Sourced from the F-Series and E-Series, the Grand Marquis received a revised 4-speed 4R75E transmission.

For 2007, the 4.6L V8 received flex-fuel capability (E85), and the side airbags were revised to improve safety.

For 2008, the 239 hp (178 kW; 242 PS) handling package was discontinued. The Grand Marquis was thus marketed exclusively in the single exhaust 224 hp (167 kW; 227 PS) configuration for most markets (except for GCC export models).

In 2009, side airbags became standard equipment; recessed window switches were introduced to comply with federal safety standards. The GS trim was also dropped, and the LS trims were available in fleet or retail variants.

For 2010, the Grand Marquis adopted the extended transmission tail-shaft housing from the Ford Crown Victoria Police Interceptor.

For its shortened 2011 model year, the Grand Marquis received redesigned front-seat headrests in compliance with updated federal safety standards.

Engine name	Years available	Configuration	Horsepower	Torque	Transmission
Ford Modular V8	2003–2011	4.6 L (281 cu in) SOHC 2-valve V8	224 hp (227 PS; 167 kW) (single-exhaust); 239 hp (242 PS; 178 kW) (dual-exhaust; Handling Package, LSE, GCC export)	272 lb⋅ft (369 N⋅m); 287 lb⋅ft (389 N⋅m)	Ford 4R70W 4-speed overdrive automatic (2003–2004) Ford 4R70E 4-speed overdrive automatic (2005) Ford 4R75E 4-speed overdrive automatic (2006–2011)

=== Sales ===
Production figures
Year	2003	2004	2005	2006	2007	2008	2009	2010	2011	Total Production
Units	92,140	87,583	66,133	54,688	50,664	29,766	24,783	28,543	248	434,548

== Export markets ==
The Grand Marquis was sold throughout North America during its production, although it was not always badged as a Mercury. Outside of North America, exports were concentrated on the Middle Eastern market, where its large size and V8 power were attributes sought by buyers towards the end of production.

=== Canada ===
After 1999, Ford of Canada discontinued sales of the Ford Crown Victoria outside of commercial fleets and law enforcement, concentrating civilian sales in Canada on the Mercury Grand Marquis. Following the 2004 model year, the Mercury brand was phased out in Canada, though Ford of Canada would market the Grand Marquis through its Ford dealerships. Sales continued through the end of production in 2011, as the redesigned 2011 Ford Taurus replaced it.

=== Mexico ===
Ford de Mexico would twice market the Mercury Grand Marquis under the Ford brand. In 1982, the Grand Marquis was introduced as the replacement for the Ford LTD Crown Victoria and wagons, but it was always sold in Mexico as a Ford model. The Grand Marquis wagon was produced and sold for the Mexican market as the Ford Grand Marquis Country Squire and sold through the 1984 model year. From 1982 until 1984, it was manufactured in Mexico. When it was reintroduced for the 1992 model year, it was imported from St. Thomas, Ontario, Canada. Wearing both Ford and Mercury badging, the Grand Marquis adopted a Ford Blue Oval on the trunk lid after 1998. From 1992 until its demise in 2004, all versions were equipped with a real dual-exhaust setup.

Although the Ford Grand Marquis was considered a sales success in Mexico and developed a reputation for luxury and prestige as the most expensive domestic nameplate available for sale, as in the United States, sales began to decline as the model aged and more modern competitors were introduced to the market. For the 2005 model year, Ford de Mexico replaced the Grand Marquis with the Ford Five Hundred, sold through 2007.

=== Middle East (GCC) ===
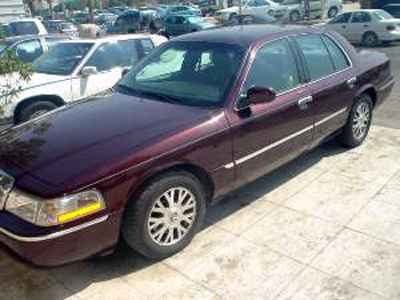
GCC-spec 2003 Grand Marquis LS

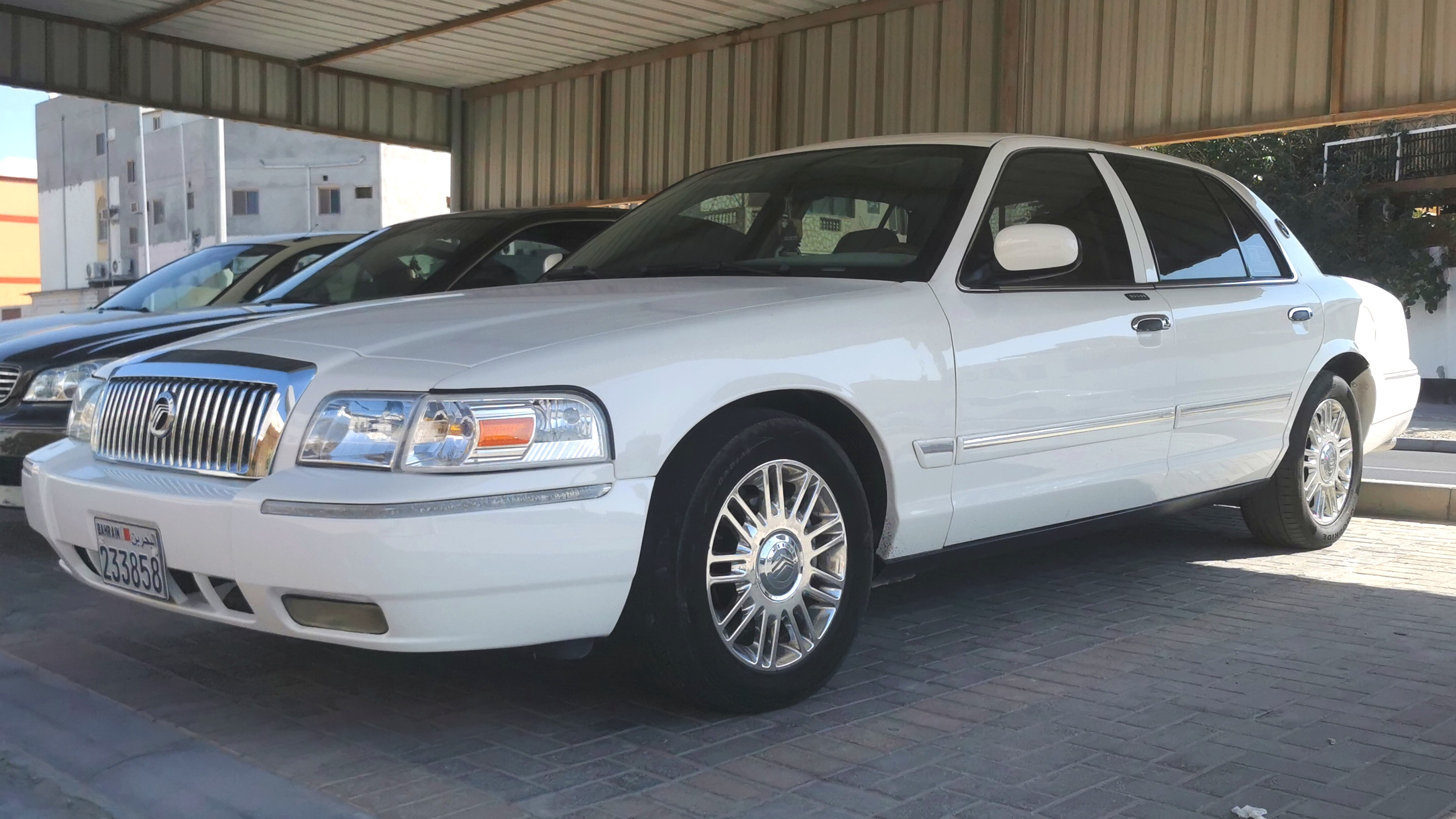
A rare long-wheelbase version of the Grand Marquis, the GSL.

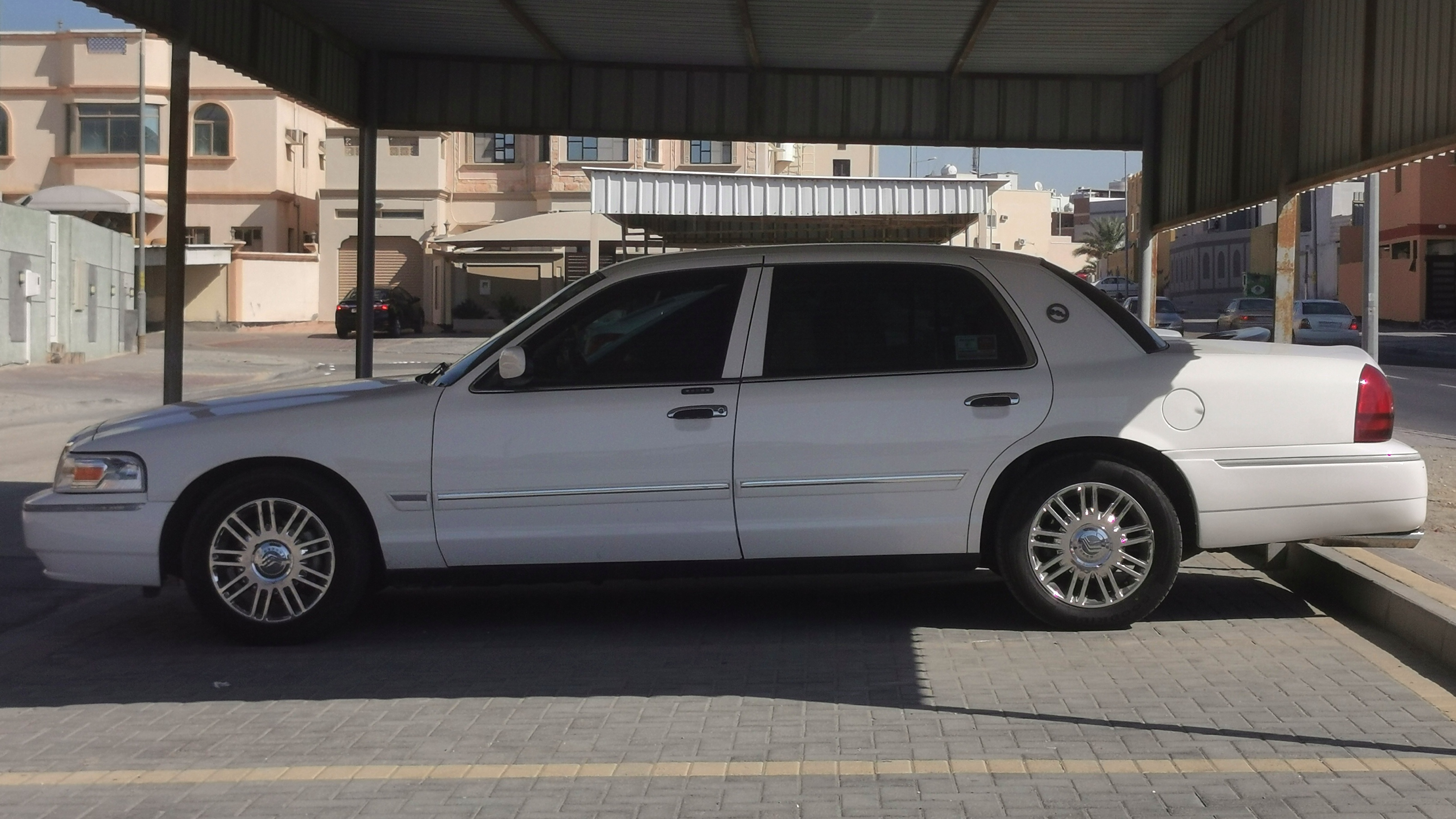
Mercury Grand Marquis GSL side view

The Grand Marquis and its Ford Crown Victoria counterpart were marketed in the Gulf Cooperation Council (GCC). The GCC-Spec vehicles initially offered a lower price, reliability, and relative simplicity (compared to German and Japanese luxury sedans). Nevertheless, the GCC-spec Mercury Grand Marquis began to lose market share in the 2000s towards updated competitors (such as the Holden-produced Chevrolet Caprice and Dodge Charger).

==== Modification ====
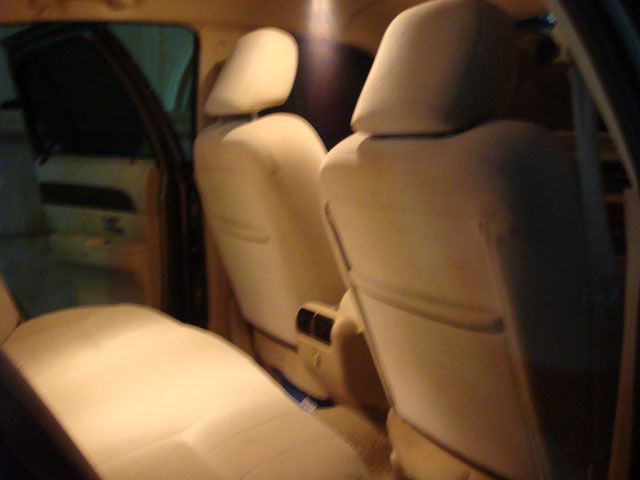
Rear interior, showing 40/20/40 Lincoln Town Car front seats

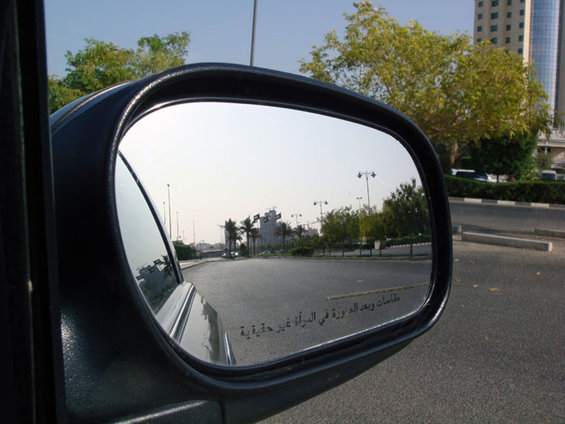
Arabic-language "Objects in mirror are closer than they appear" warning

Produced alongside North American examples in St. Thomas, Ontario, GCC-Spec versions of the Mercury Grand Marquis included several mechanical and trim modifications.

All included the High Ambient Temperature and Speed Package, heavy-duty battery, and an auxiliary transmission fluid cooler. Before 2002, export vehicles included a catalytic converter delete option. All standard-wheelbase examples were fitted with true dual exhaust.

The Grand Marquis was available with an Export Handling Package as an option to upgrade handling. The counterpart to the Handling and Performance Package sold in the United States, the Export Handling Package consisted of rear air suspension (with stiffer springs), a larger front stabilizer bar, and a heavy-duty rear stabilizer bar. In contrast to the U.S., the GCC-spec option retained the stock rear axle ratio. Standard on the LS trim level, the package was available for any standard-wheelbase GCC-spec Grand Marquis. Following 2003, the model was identified by a trunk lid spoiler (shared with the Mercury Marauder).

From 1998, the GCC-spec Mercury Grand Marquis was fitted with the 40/20/40 split front seats of the Lincoln Town Car (in place of a 50/50 split bench). To accommodate the Middle Eastern climate, cloth seats are standard equipment, with leather upholstery as an option. In addition, the language of warning labels was in Arabic.

==== Trim variation ====
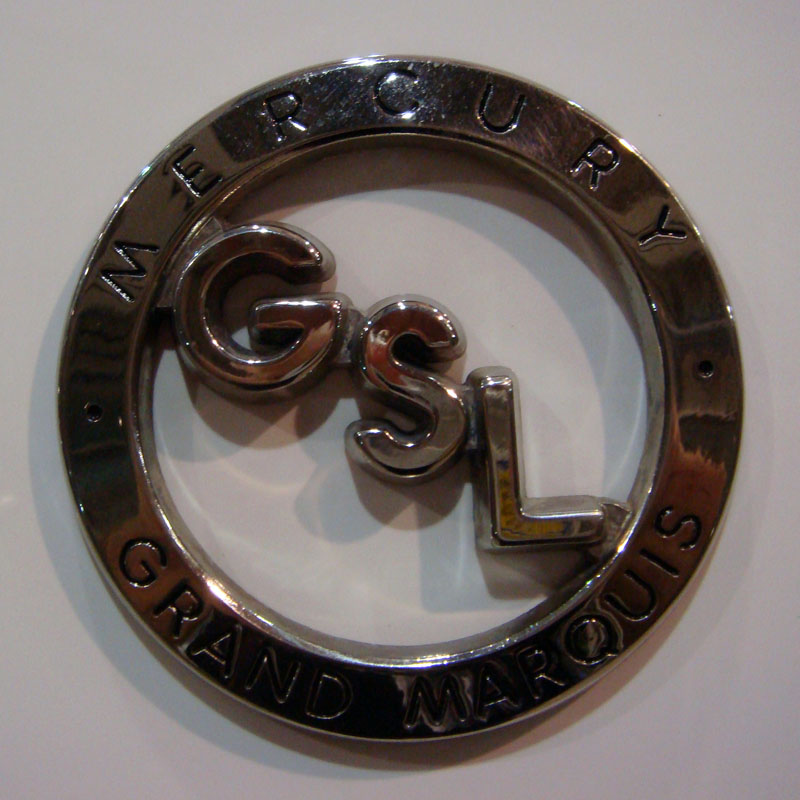
C-pillar badging on a 2009 Grand Marquis GSL

Middle Eastern versions of the Grand Marquis have slightly different options and features than their North American counterparts. Before 2009, six different trim levels were available:

- GS
- GS Convenience
- GSL (Long wheelbase version)
- LS (LSE package limited to mid-2001 to mid-2003 and 2005 model year)
- LS Premium
- LS Ultimate

In 2009, the LS models were only available with a column shifter and 40/20/40 Lincoln Town Car seats in luxury cloth or leather trim. The GSL is a long-wheelbase model offering 152 millimetres (6.0 in) of extra legroom for rear passengers. It is equipped like an LS model, with standard features such as an 8-way power driver's seat (2-way manual passenger seat), side airbags, leather-wrapped steering wheel, automatically dimming rearview mirror, electronic climate control, power-adjustable pedals, premium sound system with CD and cassette, 17-inch wheels with 235/55WR17 Goodyear Eagle RS-A tires, heated door mirrors, fog lights and special "GSL" badging. The once-optional gauge cluster is standard, with controls on the dashboard's center between the audio unit and climate controls. In North America, this model was only available to fleet customers as a commercial (taxi) version of the Ford Crown Victoria.

For the 2009 model year, the Grand Marquis was available in two trim levels, GSL and LS, which were near-identical regarding features and options. The LS was a de-contented fleet model that lost standard features such as an overhead console with a compass and a power passenger seat. The Export Handling Package was dropped, eliminating features such as the Mercury Marauder spoiler and rear air suspension.

The GS model reappeared in the lineup for the 2010 model year. Several features (such as the Mercury Marauder spoiler) became available as standalone options. The Export Handling Package was made standard and included a power passenger seat. In Kuwait, the LS model (M7F) was not available to the general public in 2010, as they are heavily sold to fleet buyers, such as the Ministry of Defense, Ministry of Interior, Ministry of Health, and state-owned Kuwait Oil Company, where they are given to employees as fringe benefits.

For the 2011 model year, the long-wheelbase GSL was replaced by the GS, and the LS model was made available again to the general public in Kuwait. The LS Ultimate Edition remained a Fleet model and differed slightly from the GS, equipped with leather seats, electronic automatic temperature control (EATC), and an automatically dimming rear-view mirror. Lumbar support was no longer available.

== Discontinuation ==
In 2006, Ford's The Way Forward restructuring plan detailed that the company would be closing 14 manufacturing plants in North America by 2012. This was estimated to save Ford nearly US$5,000,000,000 and reduce their workforce by nearly 30,000. The St. Thomas Assembly Plant, where the Grand Marquis and Crown Victoria were assembled, was switched to a single daily production shift to reduce operating costs, with the Lincoln Town Car joining the two in production at St. Thomas by 2008.

Consequently, in 2008, Ford indicated that the St. Thomas Assembly Plant would be closing by 2010. However, the Canadian Auto Workers Union successfully negotiated an extension to at least 2011. The closure was made official in 2009, as Ford confirmed that the St. Thomas Assembly would be closed at the end of 2011.

Moreover, due to the severe effects of the 2008–2010 automotive industry crisis, on June 2, 2010, Ford formally announced that it would end production of all Mercury vehicles by the end of 2010; the brand was discontinued after 72 years. In September 2010, the final Grand Marquis models for retail sale were produced after a short production run. Slated to end production in December 2010, the production of fleet models was extended due to a parts shortage at St. Thomas Assembly. The final Grand Marquis, a white LS Fleet model, was produced on January 4, 2011, at 7:46 am. It was the very last Mercury produced by Ford. The St. Thomas Assembly plant in Ontario, Canada, closed on September 15, 2011, ending the production of the Ford Crown Victoria and Lincoln Town Car.

In continuous production for 36 years, the Grand Marquis was the longest-produced and second best-selling Mercury (behind the Cougar), with over 2.7 million produced. Among Ford Motor Company models in North America, only the Ford Econoline, Ford Mustang, Ford Thunderbird, Ford F-Series, and Lincoln Continental nameplates have been produced longer. The Panther platform was the basis for Grand Marquis design for 32 years. Nearly unmatched by other automakers for longevity, the Grand Marquis's external appearance remained unchanged for the last 19 years of its production life (along with its engine, the 2011 model shared many body panels with its 1992 counterpart).

Production totals (1983–2011)
Year	1983–1991	1992–1997	1998–2002	2003–2011	Total production
Units	987,818	688,107	606,206	434,548	2,716,679
