= Lorain Assembly =

Defunct automative factory in Ohio

Coordinates: 41°25′20″N 82°16′27″W

Lorain Assembly Plant
- Built: 1956–1958
- Operated: 1958–2005
- Location: 5401 Baumhart Road; Lorain, Ohio, United States
- Industry: Automotive
- Products: Ford E-Series
- Employees: 1,700 (2003)
- Area: 225 acres (91 ha)
- Volume: 4,100,000 square feet (380,000 m^{2})
- Owner: Ford Motor Company

Lorain Assembly was an automobile manufacturing plant in Lorain, Ohio owned by Ford Motor Company. The plant opened in 1958 and closed in 2005, having produced approximately 8,000,000 vehicles under 13 model names. The plant was represented by the UAW Local 425.

== History ==
=== 1958–2003 ===
The plant was opened on May 19, 1958, after Ford broke ground on its new factory there on November 21, 1956, with the first vehicle, a Ford F-100 pickup truck, rolling off the assembly line. On April 3, 1962, the factory produced its one millionth vehicle, a Ford Econoline van.

At its height in the 1970s, the plant employed about 7,500 people. In August 1996, the first all-new 1997 Econoline models rolled out of the Lorain plant, which introduced a new front grille with an oval cutout.

In March 1997, Ford Motor Company announced it would lay off about 1,800 hourly workers at the plant due to the discontinuation of the Ford Thunderbird and Mercury Cougar car lines. While the Ford Thunderbird was discontinued, the Lorain factory continued building the Ford E-Series van for several years.

On January 11, 2002, Ford Motor Company announced it would lay off 190 workers at the Lorain Assembly Plant as part of a massive global restructuring plan that cut 35,000 jobs worldwide and 22,000 in North America. In October of the same year, the plant was half-empty following the end of Thunderbird production in 1997.

=== 2003–2006: Closure and sale ===
In September 2003, Ford Motor Company announced it would close the Lorain Assembly plant in Lorain, Ohio, as part of a new four-year labor agreement with the United Auto Workers. The plant closed on December 23, 2005, with the last vehicle produced was the Ford E-Series van. Some of the employees working at the Lorain Assembly at the time, transferred to Ohio Assembly in Avon Lake along with Econoline production.

On December 18, 2006, Ford sold the Lorain Assembly plant to real estate developer Stuart Lichter and his Industrial Realty Group (IRG) of Downey, California, for $2.5 million.

== Products made ==
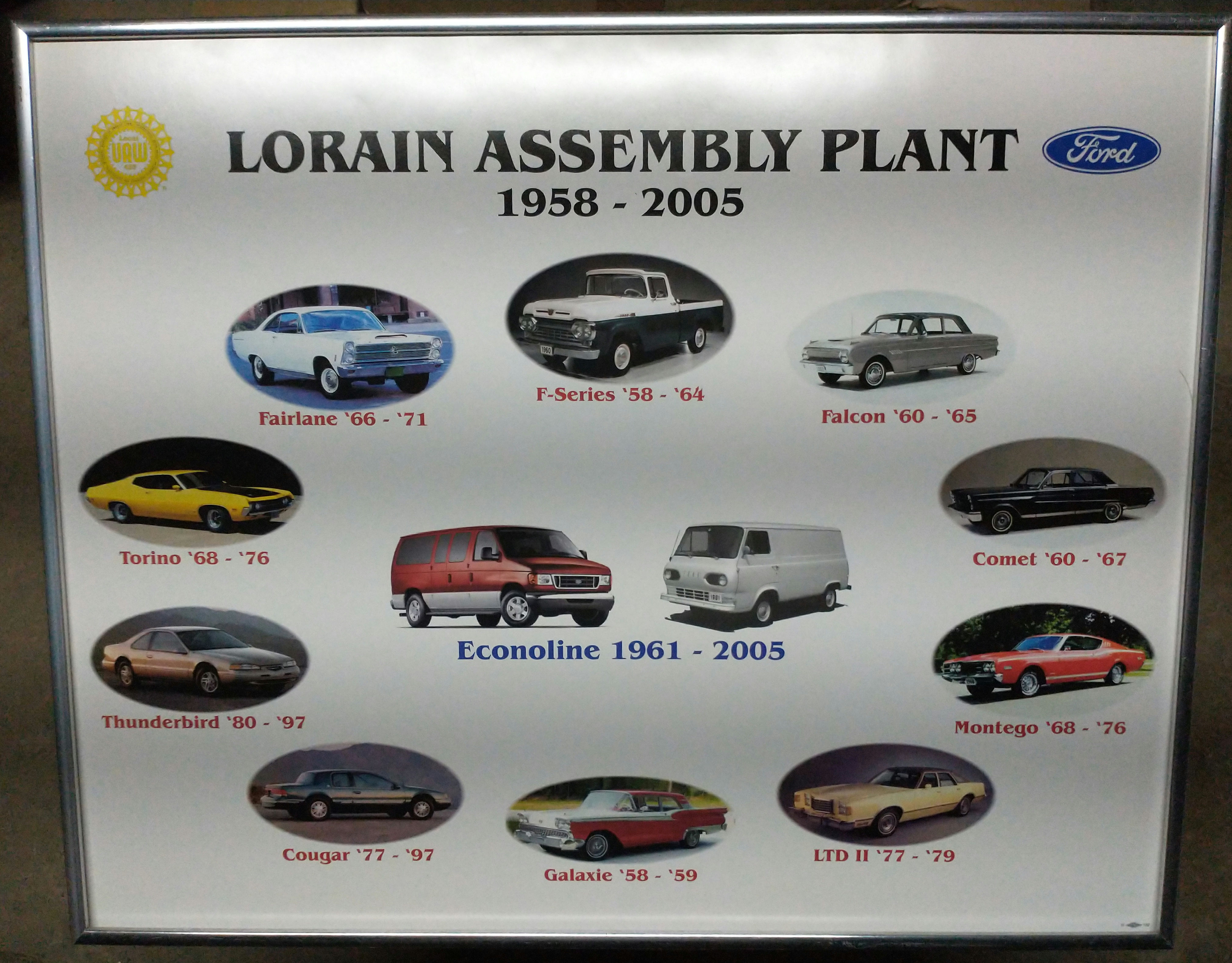
Poster showing the various models built at Lorain Assembly while in operation

- Ford Galaxie (1958–1959)
- Ford F-Series (1958–1965)
- Ford Ranchero (1958–1979)
- Ford Falcon/Mercury Comet (1960–1967)
- Ford Econoline (1961–2005)
- Mercury Cyclone (1964–1971)
- Ford Fairlane (1966–1970)
- Mercury Montego (1968–1976)
- Ford Torino / Gran Torino (1971–1976)
- Ford Elite (1974–1976)
- Ford LTD II (1977–1979)
- Mercury Cougar (1977–1997)
- Ford Thunderbird (1980–1997)

== See also ==
- Ohio Assembly

== Sources ==
- "Lorain Assembly Plant Model History". Blue Oval News. Archived from the original on October 23, 2006.
- "Ford Offers to pay for college for laid off workers". NBC News. January 20, 2006.
- "'We grieved; We're still grieving'". NBC News. December 8, 2006.
