= Ford LTD II =

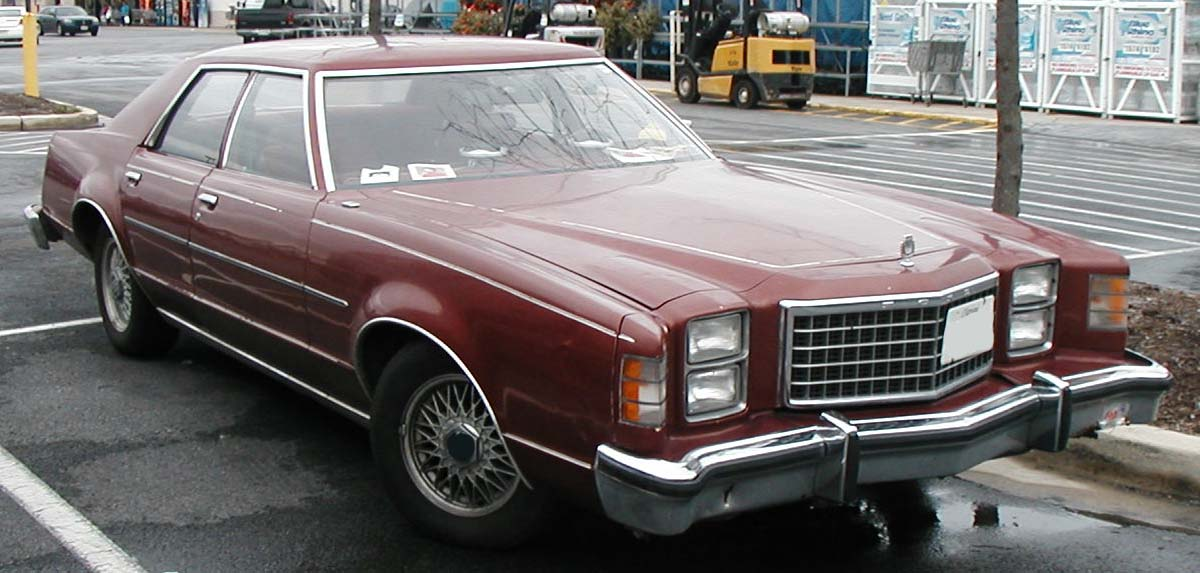
- Ford LTD II S four-door sedan

Overview
- Manufacturer: Ford
- Also called: Ford Fairlane (Venezuela)
- Model years: 1977–1979
- Assembly: Lorain, Ohio (Lorain Assembly); Atlanta, Georgia (Atlanta Assembly); Pico Rivera, California (Los Angeles Assembly); Valencia, Venezuela (Valencia Assembly)

Body and chassis
- Class: Mid-size/Intermediate
- Body style: 2-door coupe 4-door sedan 4-door wagon
- Layout: FR layout
- Related: Ford Ranchero; Ford Thunderbird (1977–1979); Mercury Cougar

Powertrain
- Engine: 302 CID Windsor V8; 351 CID 335 series V8; 351 CID Windsor V8; 400 CID 335 series V8
- Transmission: 3-speed Ford C4 automatic 3-speed Ford FMX automatic 3-speed Ford C6 automatic

Dimensions
- Wheelbase: 114 in (2,896 mm) (coupe); 118 in (2,997 mm) (sedan/wagon)
- Length: 215.5 in (5,474 mm) (coupe); 219.5 in (5,575 mm) (sedan); 223.1 in (5,667 mm) (wagon)
- Width: 78.0 in (1,981 mm)
- Height: 52.6 in (1,336 mm) (coupe); 53.3 in (1,354 mm) (sedan); 54.9 in (1,390 mm) (wagon)

Chronology
- Predecessor: Ford Torino
- Successor: Ford Granada (indirectly)

The Ford LTD II is an automobile that was produced by Ford Motor Company from the 1977 to 1979 model years. Sharing only its name with the full-size Ford LTD, the LTD II replaced the Ford Torino and Gran Torino, as the Ford Thunderbird replaced the Ford Elite. Offered in a two-door sedan, four-door sedan, and station wagon, the LTD II also served as a basis for the final generation of the Ford Ranchero coupe utility.

While never marketed by Lincoln, Mercury marketed the LTD II as the Mercury Cougar (replacing the Mercury Montego) with the same body styles as its Ford counterpart. Launched as the American auto industry commenced a period of downsizing many of its car lines, the LTD II would become notable as one of the largest vehicles ever produced as an intermediate-segment vehicle (today, mid-size car), having an exterior footprint larger than the downsized 1979 Ford and Mercury full-sized sedans (or the 1992 designs that replaced them).

Ford produced the LTD II in its Atlanta Assembly (Hapeville, Georgia), Lorain Assembly (Lorain, Ohio), and Los Angeles Assembly (Pico Rivera, California) facilities. After 1979, the LTD II was never directly replaced; as the Ford model line transitioned to front-wheel drive vehicles during the 1980s, the role of the Torino/LTD II was largely adopted by the Ford Taurus.

== Background ==
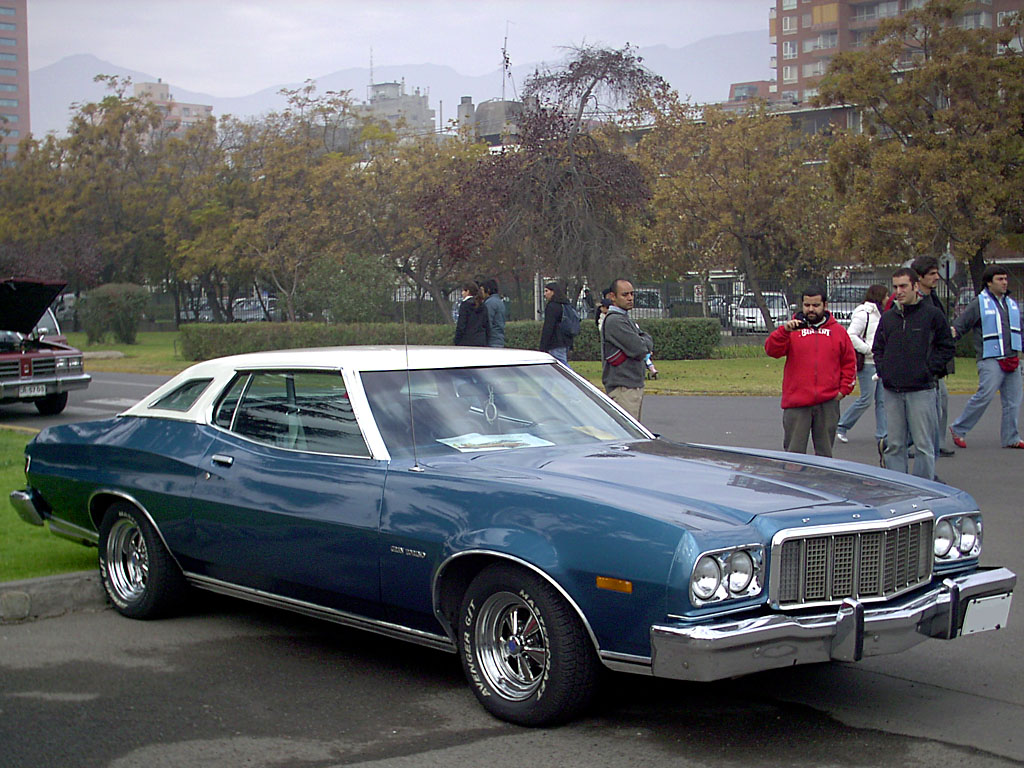
A 1974 Ford Gran Torino Brougham (LTD II predecessor)

For the 1977 model year, Ford Motor Company made substantial revisions to its intermediate-segment product lines involving both the Ford and Mercury brands to help boost sales. As part of the model changes, several product lines were given midcycle updates. To further revive interest, other model lines were consolidated to reduce internal competition and overlap.

Central to the model revision was the discontinuation of the Ford Torino, Gran Torino and Elite. While the Torino chassis and body were given extensive updates to extend the lifespan, the Torino became the Ford LTD II ("II" to distinguish the intermediate model line from the full-sized LTD). In effect, LTD II served as a placeholder downsized LTD model offering to help compete against GM's 1977 downsized full size car lines until an all new downsized full size LTD was ready for 1979. A similar practice used by Chrysler moved full size nameplates Dodge Monaco and Plymouth Fury to restyled versions of their intermediate models replacing the Dodge Coronet and Plymouth Satellite.

Alongside a massive exterior update, the Ford Elite became the downsized Ford Thunderbird with a reduced price allowing Ford to better compete against the Chevrolet Monte Carlo (and its various General Motors counterparts) and the Chrysler Cordoba, reducing product overlap between the Thunderbird and the Continental Mark V.

As Ford discontinued the Torino, Mercury replaced the Montego, as it expanded the Mercury Cougar nameplate to its entire intermediate model line with the Cougar XR7 becoming a direct counterpart of the Thunderbird.

== Design overview ==
=== Chassis ===
The LTD II uses the body-on-frame construction shared with the 1972–1976 Torino/Montego. As with the LTD, the LTD II used a full perimeter frame; to isolate road shock from the body, the frame was fitted with 14 rubber body mounts and five crossmembers. On the rear suspension, the four-link solid rear axle used coil springs.

The LTD II carried over much of its powertrain line from the Torino, with one exception; in the interest of fuel economy, the 460 V8 was dropped from all Ford and Mercury intermediates, with the 302 V8 making its return as the standard engine (outside of California). As options, Ford offered the 351M V8 and the 351 Windsor V8, with a 400-cubic-inch V8 serving as the largest engine offering. For 1979, the 400 V8 was discontinued.

=== Body ===
Although the transition from the Torino to the LTD II is theoretically a midcycle update, Ford stylists made several styling changes to introduce the new model line, moving away from the Coke-bottle styling that dominated the exterior of its Torino/Montego predecessor. All body styles (including wagons) featured frameless door glass; the 4-door models had a thin, fixed "B" pillar. Like the later Torino models, the LTD II coupe lacked a fixed "B" pillar, but the rear quarter windows didn't roll down, making this model a coupe rather than a true 2-door hardtop.

Though limited funds precluded a complete redesign of the exterior, the roofline and all sheet metal from the doors rearward were given an extensive update. Adopting much of the design language of the redesigned Thunderbird, the roofline was given larger, straight-edged windows (including optional opera windows) and a level beltline, while the body retained relatively large fender flares.

The LTD II carried over the use of the Elite's hood and modified front fenders with a restyled front end panel adapting vertically stacked rectangular headlamps and a new grille. The rear end adopted styling elements of the full-sized Ford LTD. Due to the cost of redesigning the rear quarter side panels, the LTD II station wagon was produced with rear doors and rear quarter panels unchanged from the earlier Mercury Montego line; the station wagon was discontinued after 1977.

The LTD II was produced in three trim levels, base-trim "S", standard-trim, and the luxury-minded LTD II Brougham. Bucket seats with console and floor shifter were available on base- and Brougham-level coupes.

1977–1979 Ford LTD II body configurations

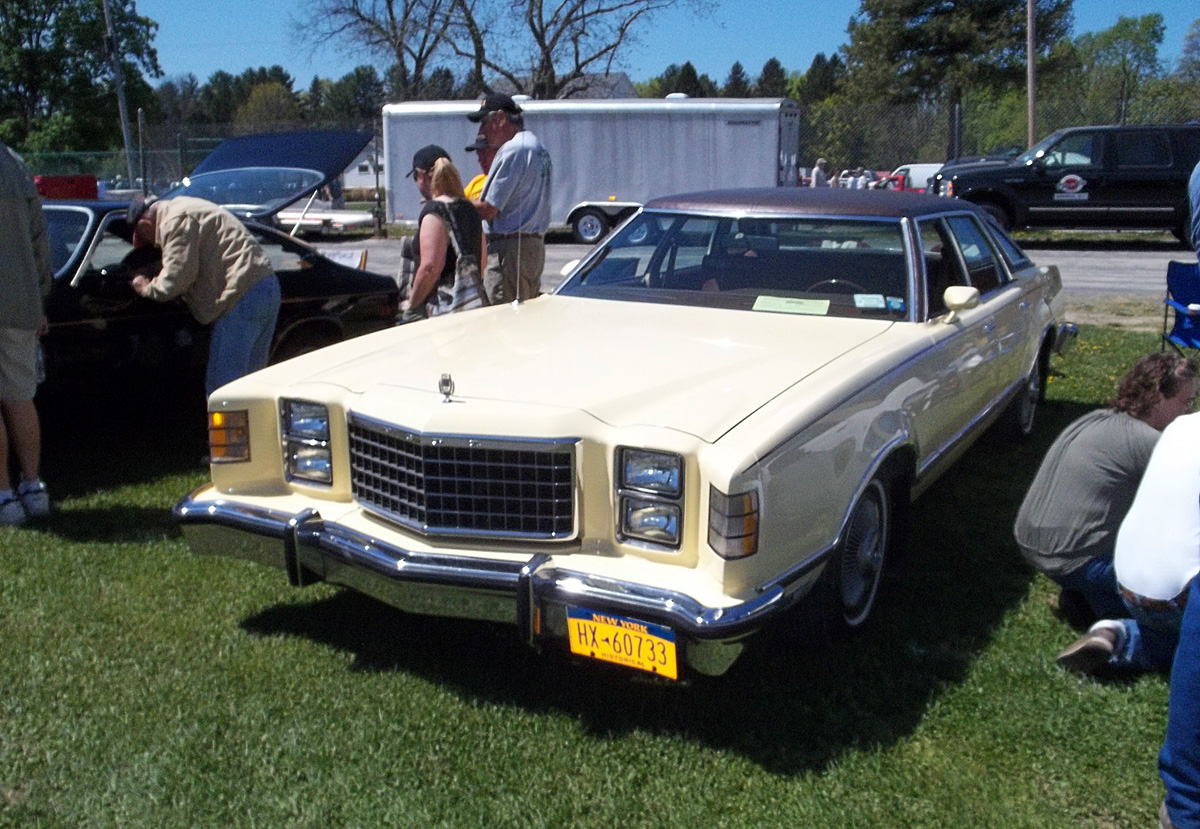
Ford LTD II Brougham four-door

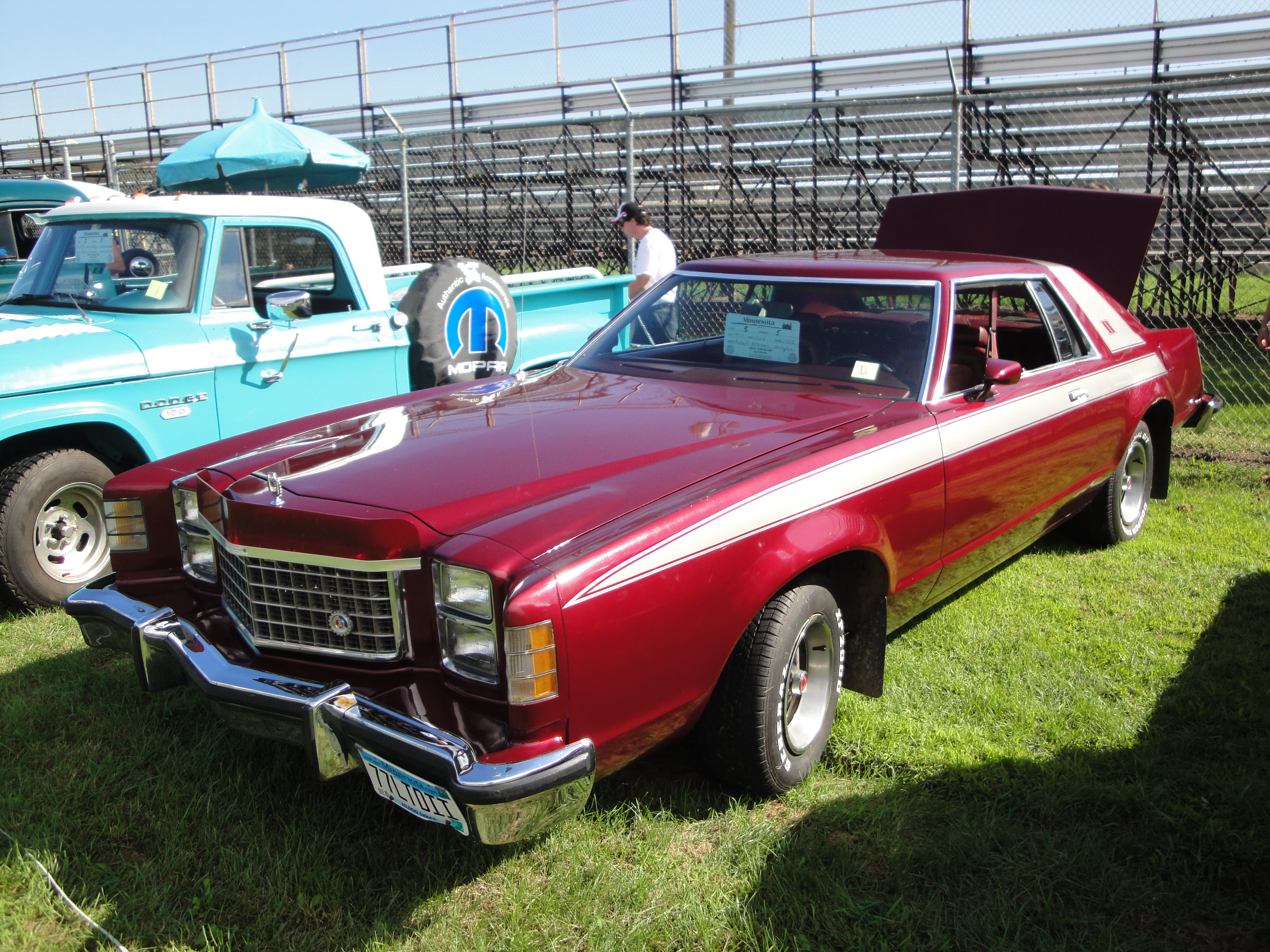
Ford LTD II two-door

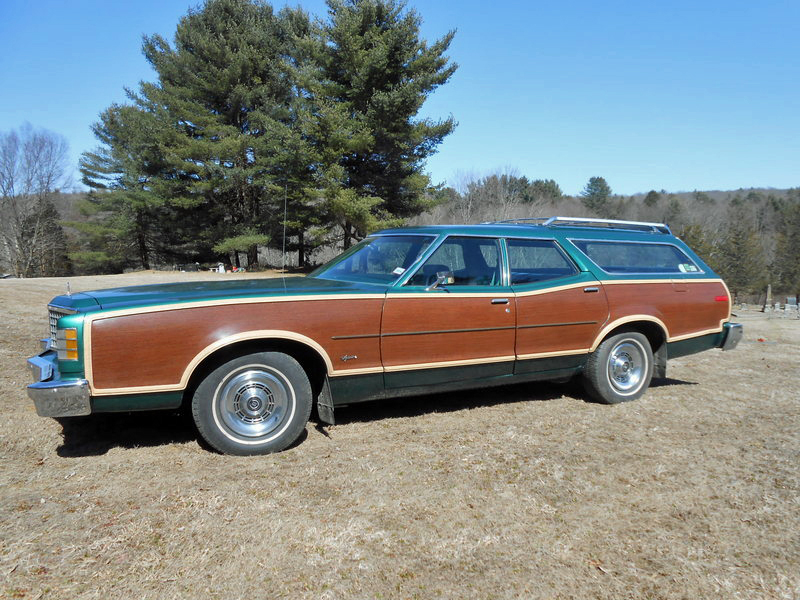
1977-only Ford LTD II Squire station wagon

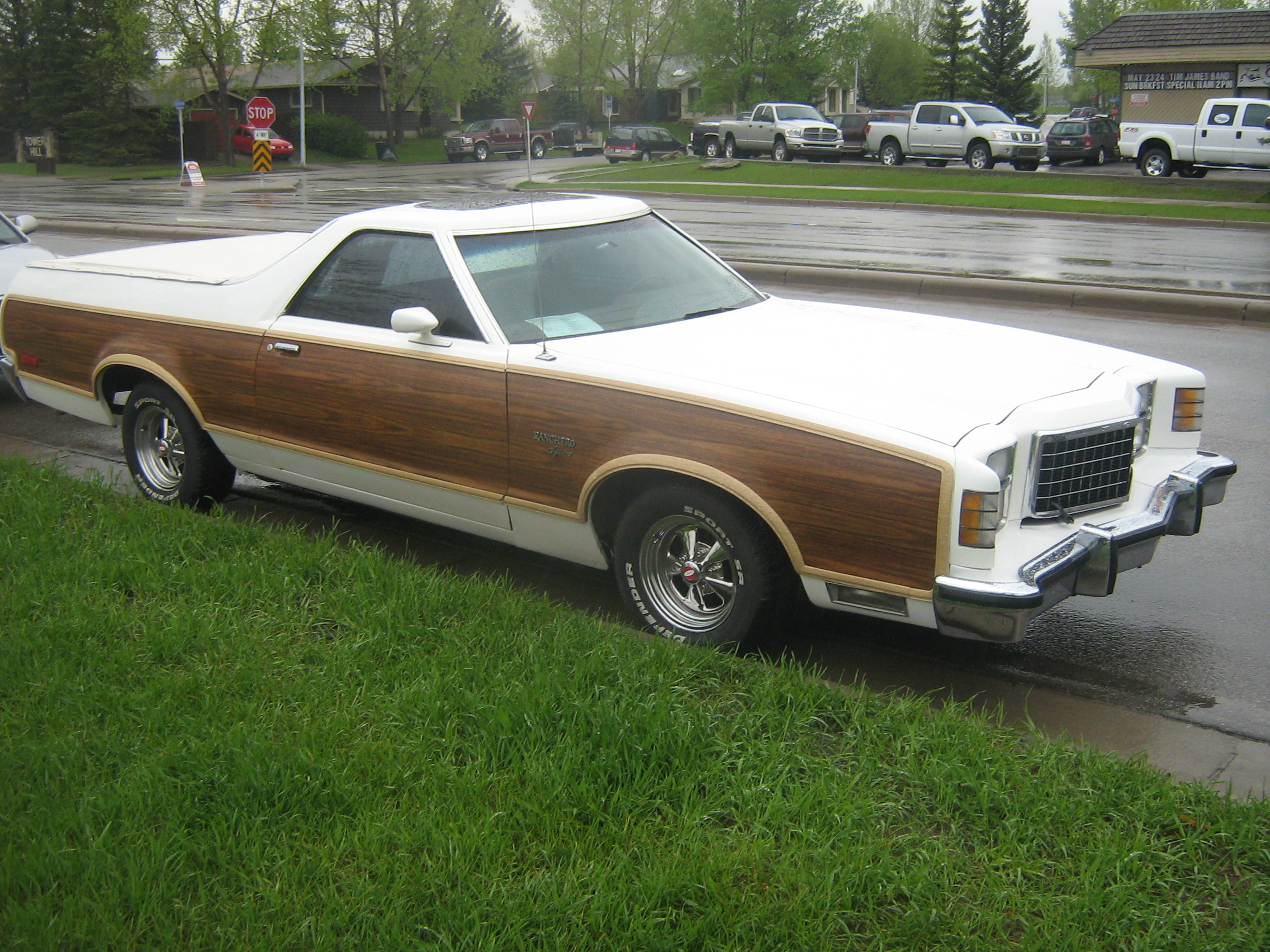
1977–1979 Ford Ranchero in Squire trim

== Discontinuation ==
Initially popular at the time of its 1977 debut, sales of the LTD II declined rapidly due to several factors. At the point of its launch, the American car market was met with the downsizing of the Chevrolet Impala and Caprice. The LTD II name was a marketing attempt to offer a choice of a downsized LTD model to compete with the downsized Impala and Caprice while still competing directly against the same sized 1977 Chevrolet Malibu. The Impala and Caprice downsizing resulted in the LTD II having a larger exterior footprint with a smaller interior volume. The downsizing of full-sized sedans by GM was met with success, with the Chevrolet Impala/Caprice becoming the best-selling 1977 vehicle in the United States. For 1978, GM downsized its intermediates, with the Malibu (the direct competitor of the LTD II) adopting near-compact dimensions.

Within Ford Motor Company, the LTD II met a high degree of internal competition from the newly redesigned Thunderbird while sharing the chassis, powertrain, interior and much of the body with similar pricing. While eliminating the previous model overlap with the Continental Mark series, the redesigned Thunderbird proved highly popular, reducing sales of the LTD II two-door body style. For 1978, the Ford Fairmont was introduced as the official replacement for the long-running Ford Maverick. While officially rated a compact (nearly two feet shorter and seven inches narrower than the LTD II), the interior dimensions of the Fairmont bordered the midsize segment as downsizing was expanded to intermediate-size vehicles making it more of a competitor to the downsized 1978 Chevrolet Malibu. In addition to slow sales, potential model overlap with the Fairmont (and LTD) led to the discontinuation of the LTD II station wagon after 1977. For 1979, the LTD II effectively became obsolete upon the introduction of the downsized Ford LTD. In a similar fashion to the 1977 Chevrolet Impala/Caprice, the full-size LTD was smaller than the intermediate LTD II (11 inches shorter in length, 4 inches shorter in wheelbase, 1 inch narrower, and 500 pounds lighter), yet rivaled its 1978 full-size LTD predecessor in interior space.

Following the 1979 model year, Ford ended its use of the Torino chassis, shifting the Ford Thunderbird and Mercury Cougar XR7 to the Ford Fox platform (longer-wheelbase versions of the Ford Fairmont). The Ford Ranchero coupe utility was indirectly replaced by the Ford Ranger, as the coupe utility pickup segment was phased out in favor of compact pickup trucks in the United States.

After its 1979 discontinuation, the Ford LTD II was never directly replaced in the Ford product line. The original Ford Granada was replaced for 1981 with a version that was an alternatively styled Ford Fairmont with uplevel trim and continued to serve the mid-sized segment while indirectly replacing the LTD II. As part of a mid-cycle refresh for 1983, the Granada was restyled and renamed LTD. For 1986 the LTD continued production after the introduction of the Ford Taurus which replaced the LTD after the end of the model year. After the 1991 discontinuation of the LTD Crown Victoria, Ford ended the use of the LTD nameplate in North America.

Production Figures:

Ford LTD II Production Figures
	Coupe	Sedan	Wagon	Yearly Total
1977	87,959	94,330	50,035	232,324
1978	85,289	85,255	-	170,544
1979	19,134	29,430	-	48,564
Total	192,382	209,015	50,035	451,432

== Venezuela ==
Ford manufactured the LTD II in Venezuela on the Valencia assembly line. It was marketed continuing to use the names Fairlane and Fairlane 500 which were also used on the previous 1972–1976 Torino based cars in place of the Torino name. All three body styles were available.
