= Ford Elite =

Ford Gran Torino Elite Ford Elite
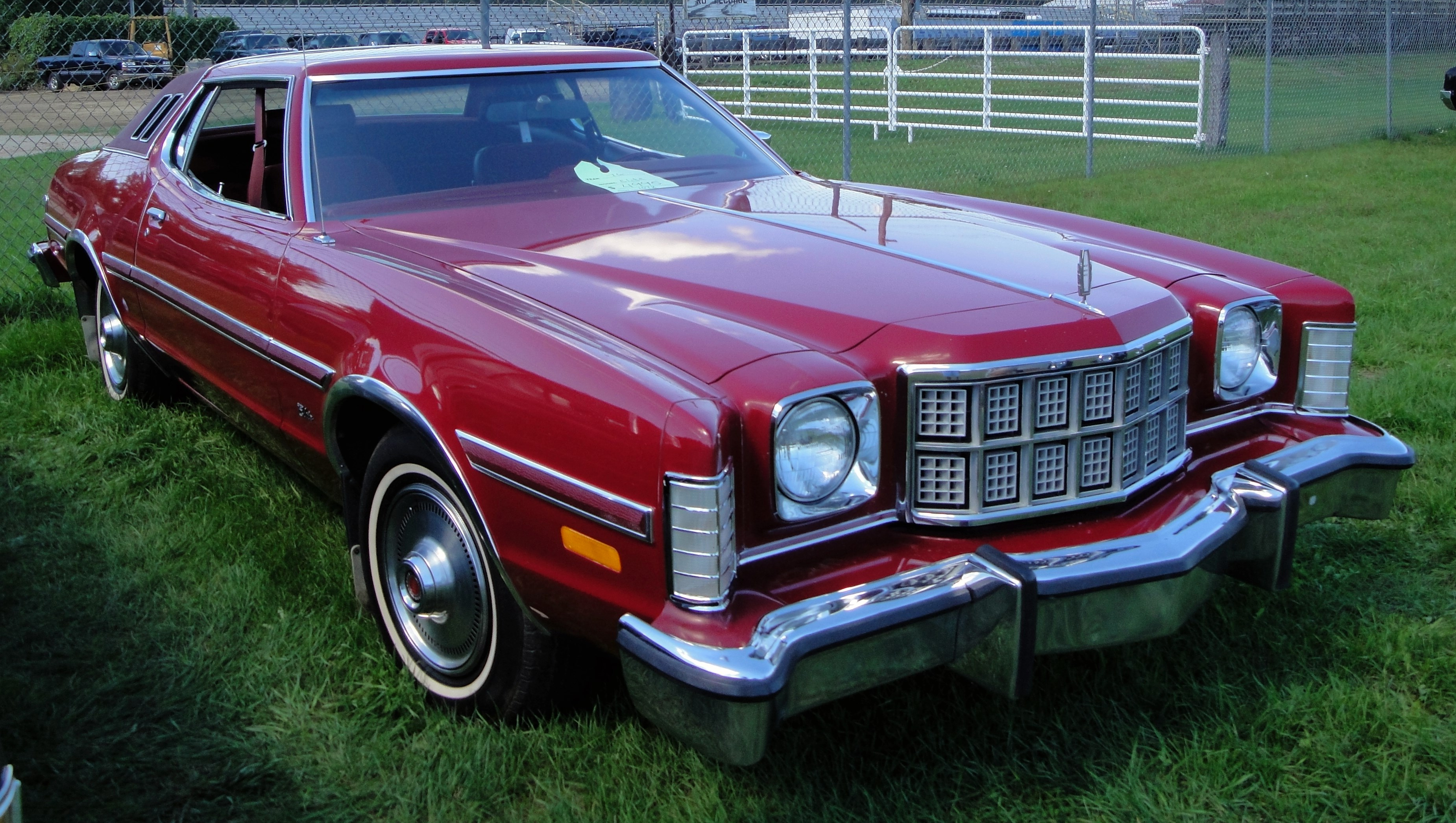
- 1976 Ford Elite 2-Door Hardtop

Overview
- Manufacturer: Ford
- Production: 1974–1976
- Model years: 1974 (Gran Torino Elite); 1975–1976 (Elite)
- Assembly: Chicago, Illinois (Chicago Assembly); Lorain, Ohio (Lorain Assembly); Pico Rivera, California (Los Angeles Assembly)

Body and chassis
- Class: Personal luxury car
- Body style: 2-door coupe
- Layout: FR layout
- Related: Ford Torino; Mercury Cougar; Mercury Montego

Powertrain
- Engine: 351 cu in (5.8 L) Windsor V8; 351 cu in (5.8 L) Cleveland V8; 351 cu in (5.8 L) Modified V8; 400 cu in (6.6 L) Modified V8; 460 cu in (7.5 L) 385 V8
- Transmission: 3-speed automatic

Dimensions
- Wheelbase: 114 in (2,896 mm)

Chronology
- Successor: Ford Thunderbird (seventh generation); Ford LTD II

The Ford Elite is a personal luxury car produced by Ford and marketed in North America from February 1974 to 1976, using the name Gran Torino Elite for its first model year only then simplified to just Elite for the following two model years.

== History ==
Introduced on February 18, 1974, as the Gran Torino Elite, it was initially the top-of-the-line model of the Torino series. Although advertised separately, it was titled and registered as a Gran Torino. For 1975 and 1976, the Gran Torino prefix was dropped and Elite became a stand-alone model nameplate. Early pre-production publicity photos for the 1974 model show the use of Gran Torino XL nameplates.

=== Sales competition ===
Based on the Torino, the mid-size two-door coupe was intended to be a junior model to the Thunderbird designed to compete with the increasingly popular intermediate personal luxury class of vehicles such as the Chevrolet Monte Carlo, Pontiac Grand Prix, Oldsmobile Cutlass Supreme, Buick Regal, Dodge Charger, Chrysler Cordoba and Mercury Cougar. While the Elite was a newcomer on the market for only three model years, sales performance placed it solidly in third for each of those years (respective to the other personal luxury vehicles) with a combined sales of approximately 366,000.

=== Design ===
The Elite was a low investment design derived from the concurrent Mercury Cougar XR-7 (both based on Mercury Montego two-door bodies which originated for 1972) with a mild front end restyling to resemble the Thunderbird with single round headlamps, eggcrate grille, different taillamps with a center reflector, unique twin opera windows, and large color-keyed vinyl moldings placed higher on the bodysides. The interiors were identical save for upholstery styles and minor trim variations.

=== Discontinuation ===
The Elite name was dropped after 1976 as the Ford mid-size range was restructured for the 1977 model year. The Thunderbird was dramatically reduced in size and price for 1977 by moving its nameplate to the Torino-based LTD II platform which was the restyled replacement for the Torino. In effect, the Elite continued restyled and marketed under the more-recognized Thunderbird name, and the previous full-sized Thunderbird was discontinued.

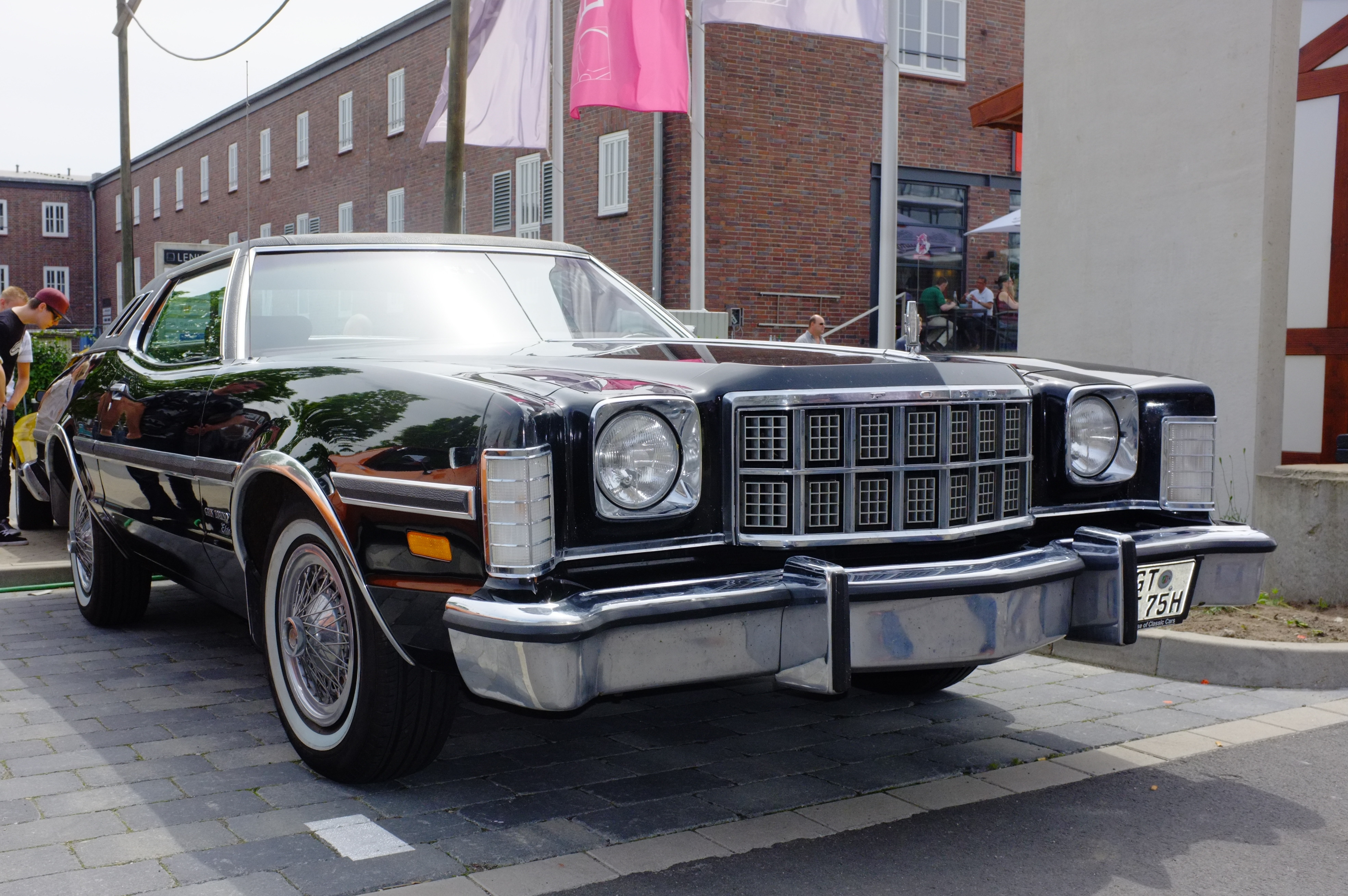
1974 Ford Grand Torino Elite

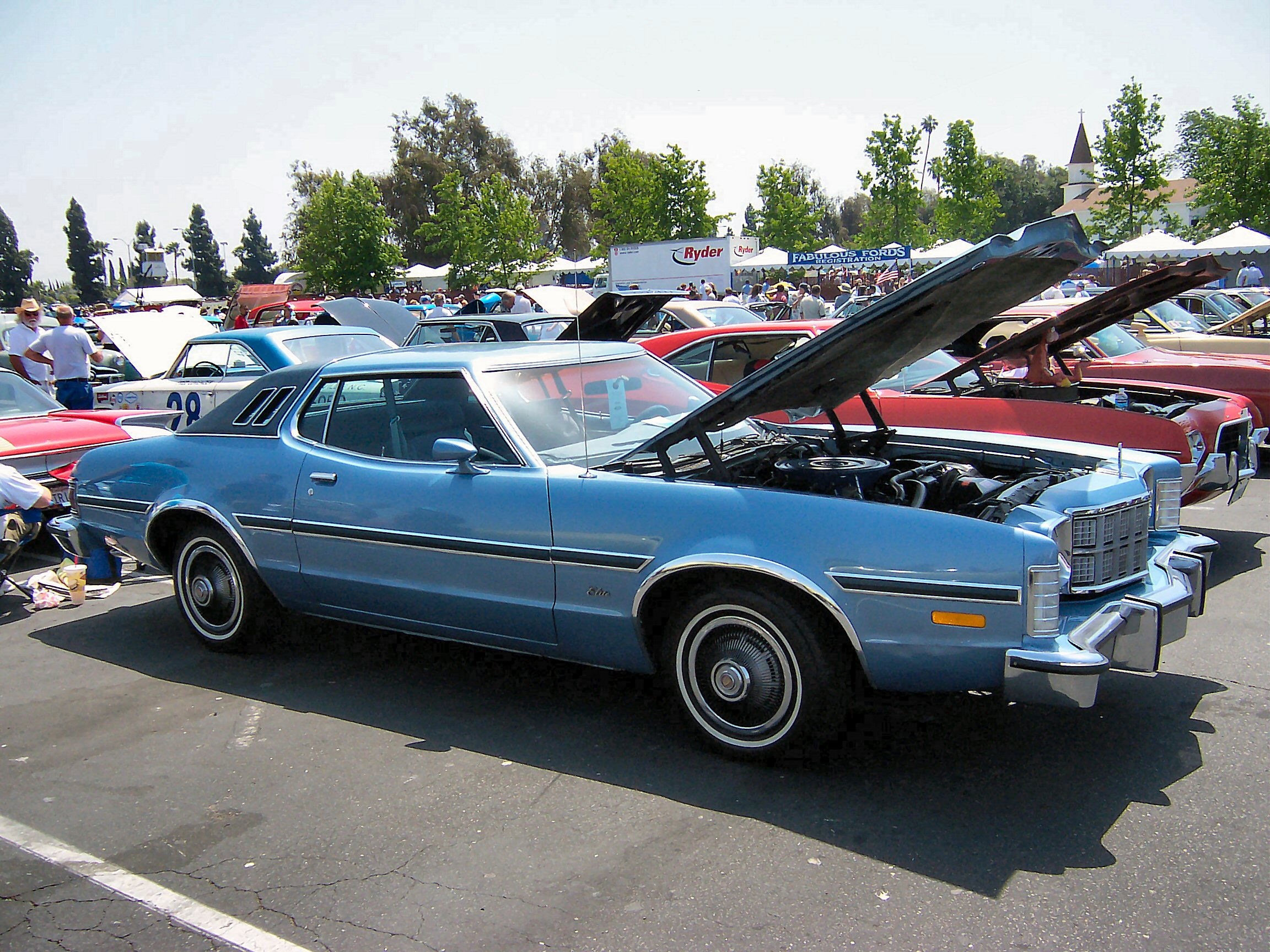
Ford Elite

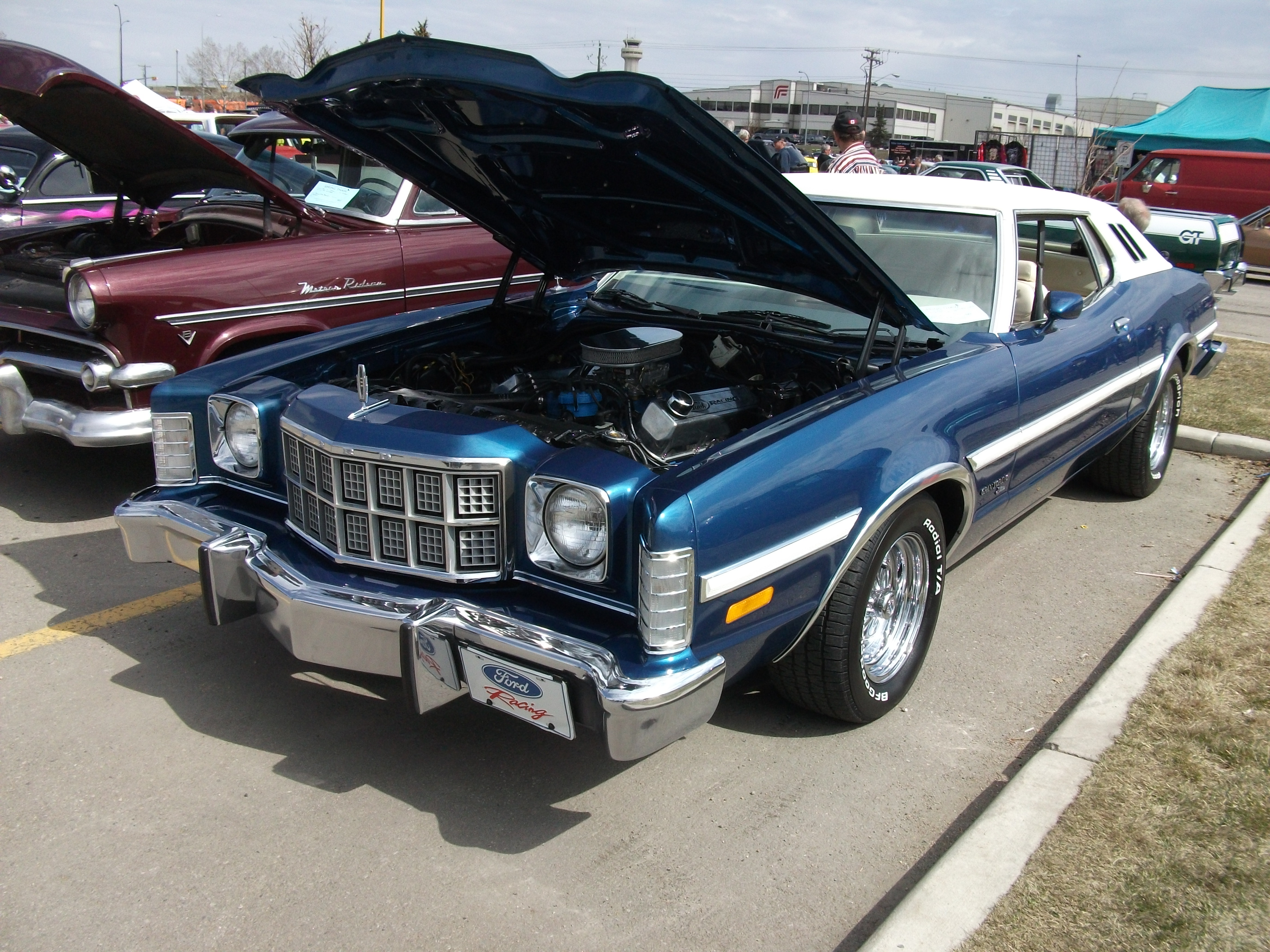
1974 Ford Gran Torino Elite

== Standard equipment ==
- 351W or 351M V8 engine, both of 351 cubic inches (5.8 L)
- 3-speed automatic transmission
- Power brakes (front disc brakes, rear drum brakes).
- Power steering
- Cloth bench seats
- Vinyl roof with twin opera windows, Landau (partial) vinyl top for 1976 model year.
- Protective padded body side moldings

== Options ==
- 351 cu in (5.8 L) 351C V8 engine, 1974 only
- 400 V8 engine of 402 cu in (6.6 L)
- 460 V8 engine of 460 cu in (7.5 L)
- Power glass moonroof
- Power steel sunroof
- Air conditioning with standard manual control or optional Automatic Temperature Control
- Metallic Glow paint
- Cruise (speed) control
- Gauge package with tachometer, oil pressure gauge, coolant temperature gauge, and ammeter gauge
- Fuel Sentry Vacuum Gauge - monitors intake manifold vacuum to give an indication of how hard the engine is working, and thus economy (not available with gauge package).
- Fuel Monitor Warning Light - as above, but an on/off light instead of a gauge.
- Bucket seats and center console (1976 only).

== In Mexico and Venezuela ==
The Elite name was also used in Mexico. The Ford Fairmont was introduced in Mexico in late 1977 as a 1978 model, replacing the Ford Maverick that was produced there locally. The Futura coupe with its distinctive Thunderbird-styled roofline was never offered in Mexico. Instead there was an uplevel 2-door sedan called the Fairmont Elite. It was distinguished from other Fairmonts by its higher level of equipment and vinyl roof. It used the four headlight grille from the Fairmont Futura along with Mercury Zephyr taillamps and rear quarter window louvers. For 1981, the Fairmont Elite switched to the Mercury Zephyr grille.

For 1982, the Fairmont Elite was renamed Ford Elite II, which was now offered in two- and four-door sedans. It continued to use the body of the Fairmont with the front end of the North American 1982 Ford Granada and matching rear bumper. The rear continued to use Mercury Zephyr taillamps.

From 1983 to 1985, a version of the North American Fox platform Ford LTD was manufactured in Venezuela and marketed as the Ford Granada Elite in uplevel trim.
