= Ford Thunderbird (seventh generation) =

Ford Thunderbird Seventh generation
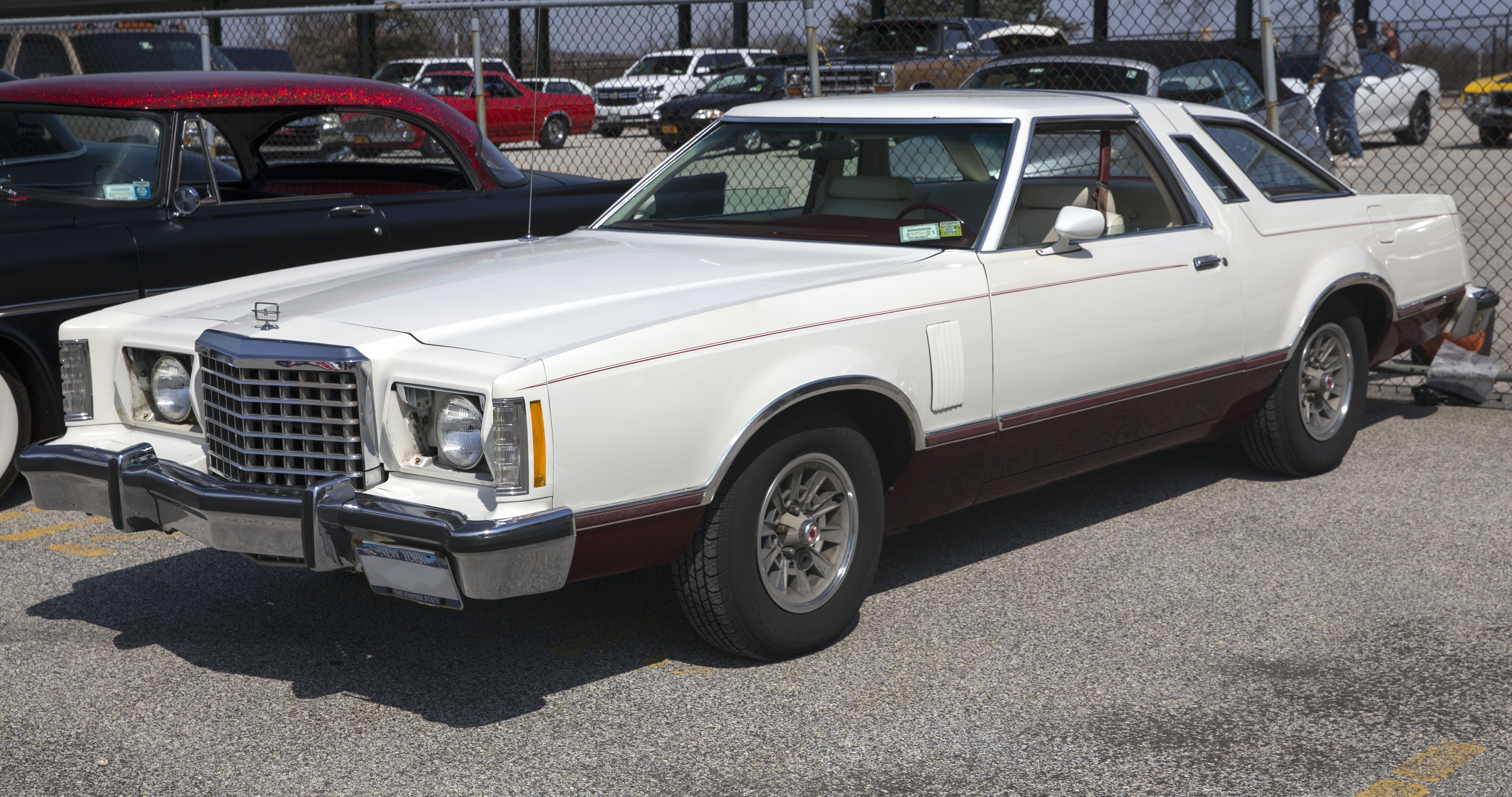
- 1977 Ford Thunderbird

Overview
- Manufacturer: Ford Motor Company
- Production: 1977–1979
- Assembly: United States: Chicago, Illinois; Pico Rivera, California

Body and chassis
- Class: Personal luxury car
- Body style: 2-door coupe
- Layout: Front-engine, rear-wheel-drive
- Chassis: body-on-frame
- Related: Ford Elite; Ford LTD II; Ford Ranchero; Ford Torino; Mercury Cougar; Mercury Montego

Powertrain
- Engine: 302 cu in (4.9 L) Windsor V8; 351 cu in (5.8 L) 351W V8; 351 cu in (5.8 L) 351M V8; 400 cu in (6.6 L) Cleveland V8

Dimensions
- Wheelbase: 114.0 in (2,896 mm)
- Length: 217.7 in (5,530 mm)
- Width: 78.5 in (1,994 mm)
- Height: 52.6 in (1,336 mm)

Chronology
- Predecessor: Ford Thunderbird (sixth generation)
- Successor: Ford Thunderbird (eighth generation)

The seventh generation of the Ford Thunderbird is a personal luxury car that was built by Ford from the 1977 to the 1979 model years. In a key marketing shift for the model range, Ford repackaged the Thunderbird from a full-size car to an intermediate car, and ceded its full-size luxury coupe status to the Ford LTD Landau coupe. Rather than being the traditional Ford counterpart of the Continental Mark V, the Thunderbird would share the chassis with the Mercury Cougar and the Ford LTD II before the Ford Fox platform version was introduced for 1980.

The squarer, sharper styling was popular, as this generation became the best selling in the history of the Ford Thunderbird. Helped by a US$2,700 drop in price from 1976, over 318,000 were sold in 1977 and 352,000 in 1978 (the best single sales year in Thunderbird history), followed by 295,000 in 1979. The styling of its unique wrapover roofline would carry over in smaller versions of Ford automobiles such as the 1978–1983 Ford Fairmont Futura and the Mercury Zephyr Z-7 coupes which were originally designed as Fairmont-based downsized Thunderbird proposals.

== Development and production history ==
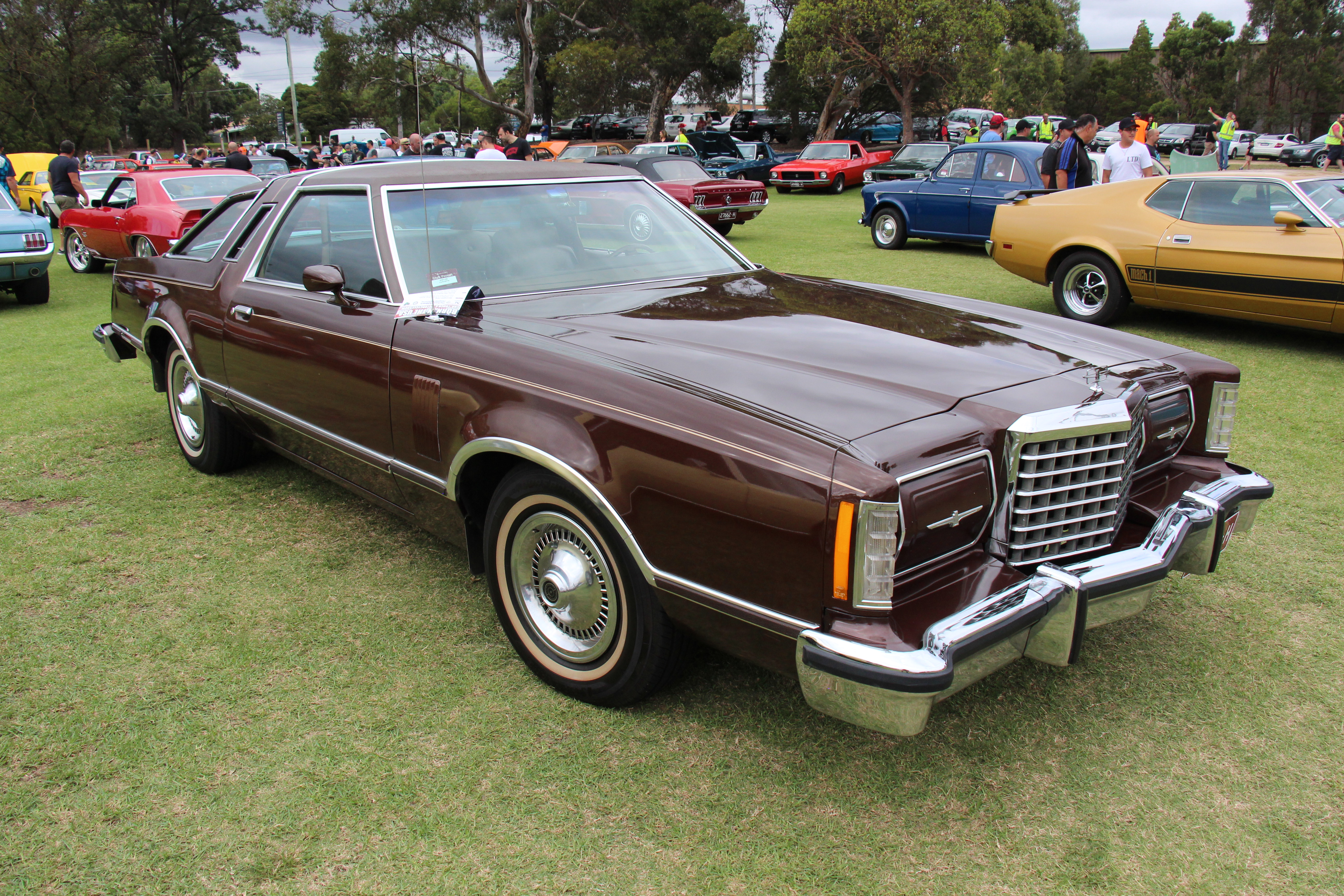
1978 Ford Thunderbird

Since Lincoln reintroduced the Continental Mark series in 1969, it had shared common engineering and underpinnings with the Thunderbird. During the 1970s, this led to the latter car becoming heavy and expensive in comparison to competition from Chrysler and General Motors. For the 1977 model year, as both cars were redesigned, the Thunderbird was split from the Continental Mark V. As the Ford LTD II replaced the Torino, the Thunderbird replaced the Elite. Alongside the Mercury Cougar XR7, the Thunderbird became more competitive in the best selling reasonably priced intermediate personal luxury car market against the Chrysler Cordoba/300, Dodge Charger/Magnum XE and the General Motors A-body quartet of the Buick Regal, Chevrolet Monte Carlo, Oldsmobile Cutlass Supreme and Pontiac Grand Prix.

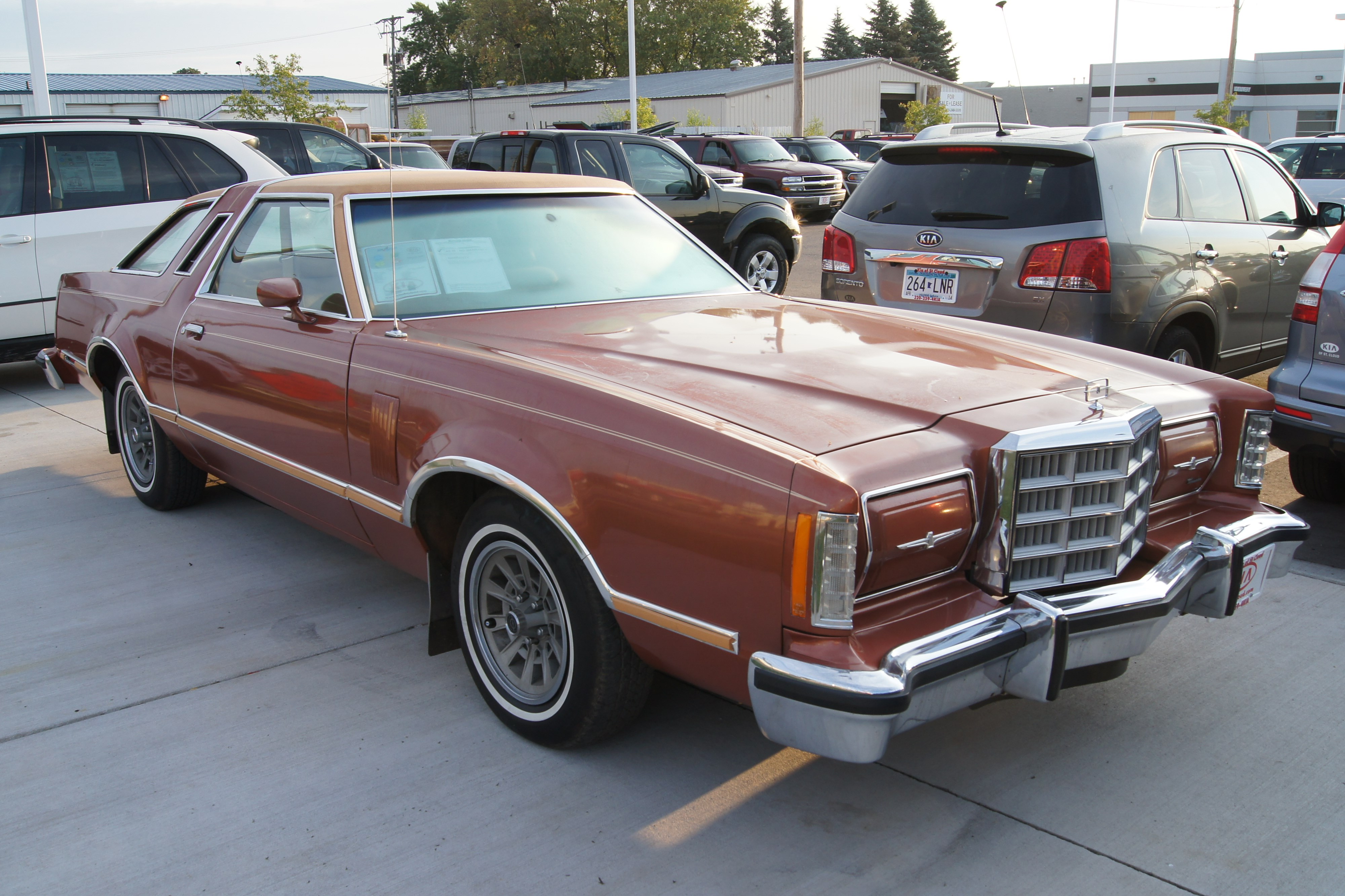
1979 Ford Thunderbird

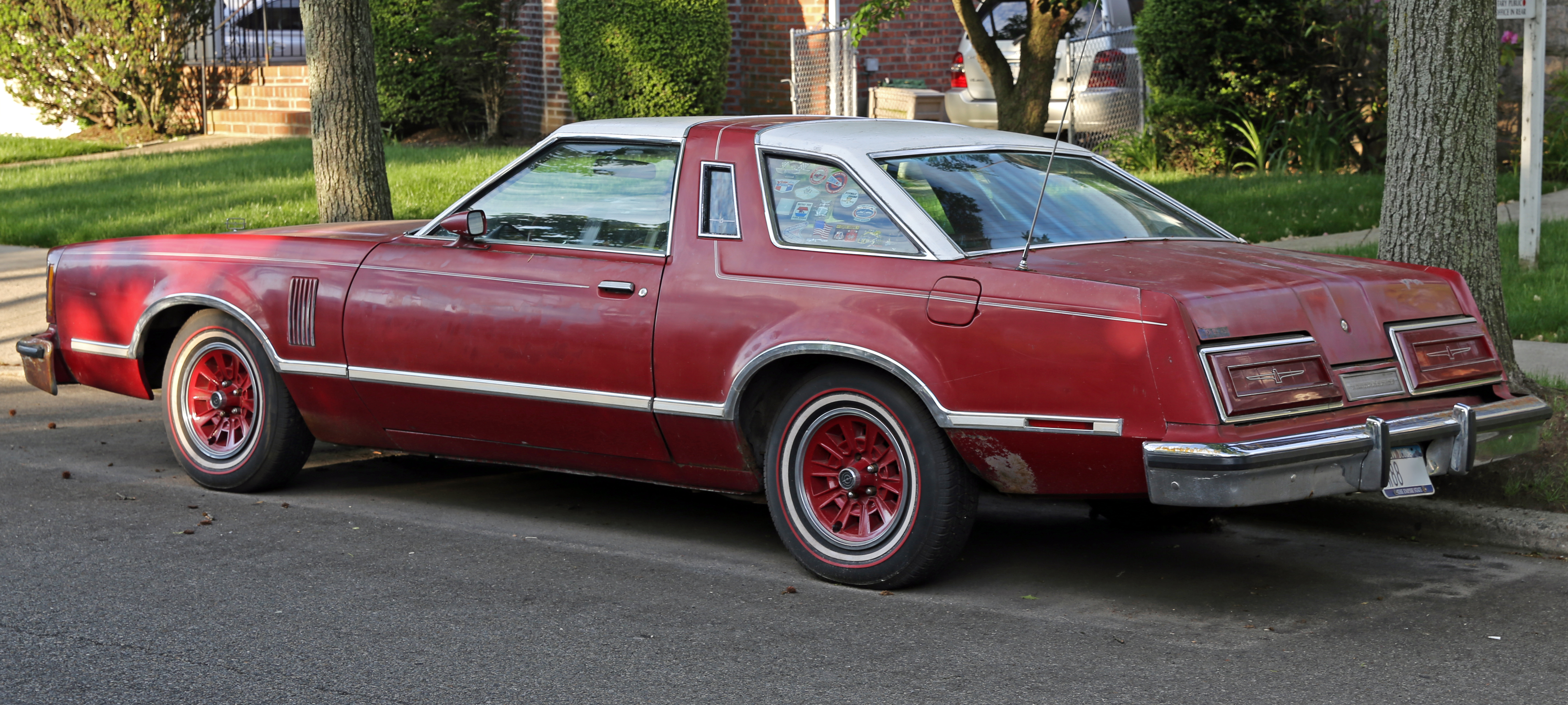
1979 Ford Thunderbird

Although not as deliberate a downsizing as what was to come to future Ford cars, the 1977 Thunderbird was shorter than its predecessor, shedding nearly 10 inches (254 mm) of length and 900 lb (408 kg) of weight; height and width remained essentially unchanged. The 1977 Thunderbird was created on the existing intermediate car platform by recycling a select mix of body, interior and trim parts from the previous year's Ford Elite, Mercury Montego and Mercury Cougar combined with all new styling from the doors back to create a dramatic new Thunderbird look. The Thunderbird was distinguished from the LTD II and Cougar 2-door models by its unique wrap-over "basket handle" roofline with opera windows and large rear side quarter windows separated from the rear window by thin C-pillars. Headlamps hidden with retractable covers and full-width dropped center taillamps made a comeback from the late 1960s. As such being based on the intermediate Ford platform, a wider range of powertrains were now available. The base engine was the 302 cu in (4.9 L) Windsor V8 (130 hp), while the larger 351 cu in (5.8 L) 351M (149 hp) and 400 cu in (6.6 L) 335 (173 hp) along with T-tops were available as options along with the 351W. In California, the 302 was not available. Although the smaller engines had lower output than the previous generation's 460 V8, the lighter weight did compensate towards overall performance; the 400 was dropped in 1979 with the introduction of CAFE requirements.

=== 1978 Diamond Jubilee Edition ===
In 1978, Ford offered the "Diamond Jubilee Edition" Thunderbird to commemorate the company's 75th year as an auto manufacturer. This option package escalated the price of the car to almost US$12,000 ($59,235 in 2025 dollars), virtually doubling the base price; it included every option except a moonroof and an engine block heater. It was originally available in only two colors—Diamond Jubilee exclusive "diamond blue" metallic, or "standard issue" ember metallic—both with matching velour cloth seats with a "biscuit" design. Later in production, Ford offered leather as an option, and offered white as an exterior color with blue or white trim and interior. This option was available on the Continental Mark V as well for the much more substantial cost of US$23,000 ($113,533 in 2025 dollars).

In 1979, a similar option package was available named "Heritage". It included basically the same optional equipment, still with only two color options available: maroon or light medium blue. The Heritage option remained available into the next two generations of the car. All Thunderbirds received a new grille pattern and revised taillamps for the last model year of this generation.

== Production totals ==
Year	Production
1977	318,140
1978	352,751
1979	284,141
Total	955,032
