= Valencia Assembly =

Automobile factory in Valencia, Venezuela

The Valencia Assembly is a Ford Motor Company automobile factory in Valencia, Venezuela, opened in 1962, and spanning 75,451.6 square metres (812,154 sq ft). The plant employed about 900 as of December 2018 before Ford offered buyouts to all employees.

On 5 May 2014, Ford of Venezuela said temporary cessation, because they were affected by shortages. A situation that has continued into both 2015 and 2016. In 2017 and 2018, several hundred vehicles were produced. The plant assembled Ford Explorer and Ford Fiesta as of 2018.

== Former products ==
- Ford Bronco
- Ford Mustang
- Ford Cargo
- Ford Corcel
- Ford EcoSport
- Ford Explorer Sport Trac
- Ford Festiva
- Ford Focus
- Ford F-Series
- Ford Fiesta
- Ford Ka
- Ford Laser
- Ford LTD II, marketed as the Ford Fairlane
- Ford Ranger
- Ford Sierra
- Ford Torino, marketed as the Ford Fairlane
- Ford Zephyr
- Ford Explorer (1990–2019)

== See also ==
- List of Ford factories
