= Mercury Montego =

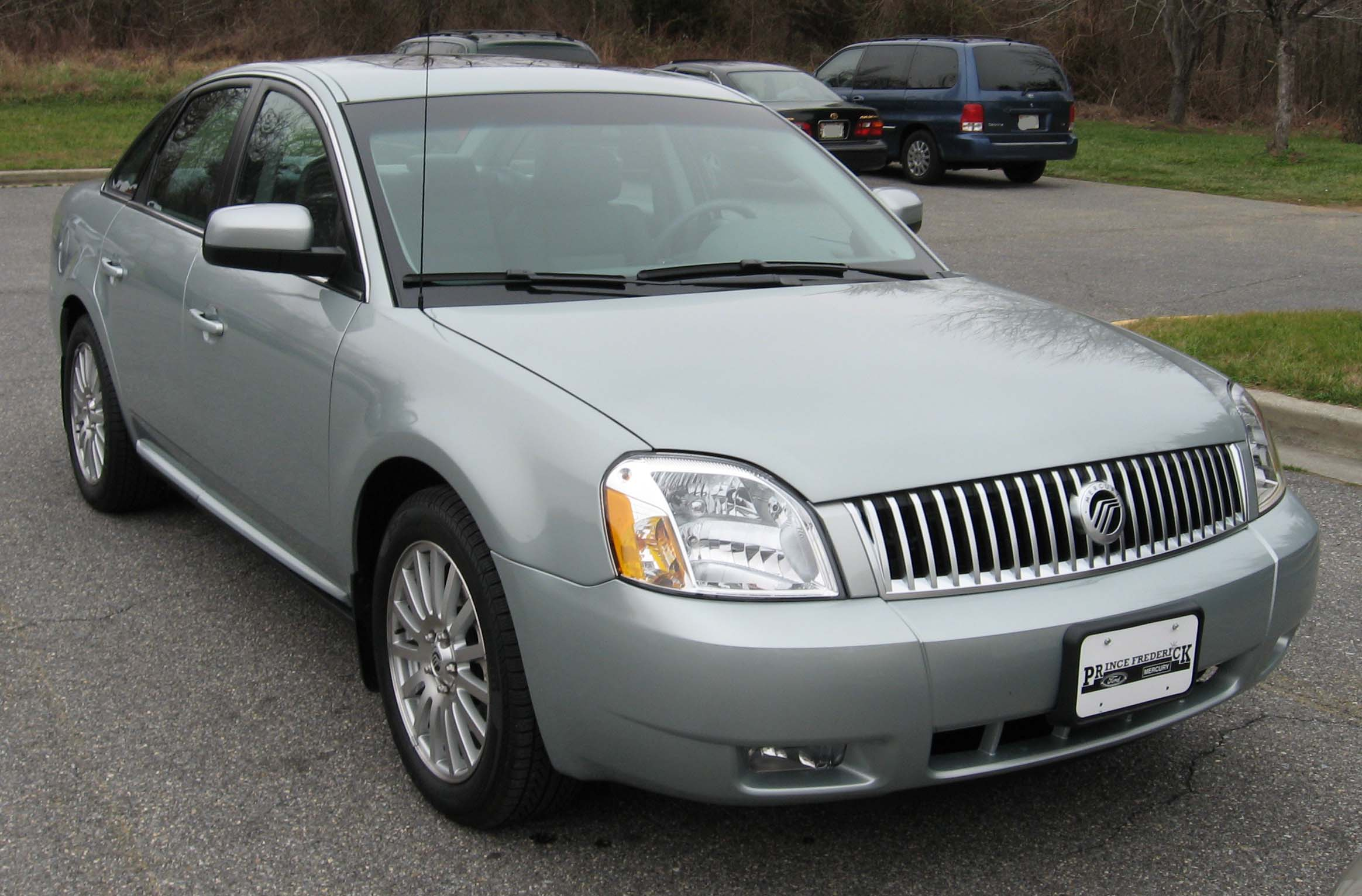

Overview
- Manufacturer: Mercury (Ford)
- Production: 1968–1976; 2004–2007
- Assembly: Atlanta, Georgia, United States; Milpitas, California, United States; Lorain, Ohio, United States; Chicago, Illinois, United States; Oakville, Ontario, Canada

The Mercury Montego is a nameplate that was applied to three separate generations of vehicles marketed by the Mercury division of Ford Motor Company. Taking its name from Montego Bay, Jamaica, the nameplate made its first appearance for 1967 in the Canadian market as part of the Mercury-derived Meteor model line. For 1968, the Mercury Montego made its debut across North America, becoming the Mercury counterpart of the Ford Torino intermediate-size model line for two generations.

For the 1977 model year, Ford revised the intermediate-size product ranges of both its Ford and Mercury divisions; as part of a mid-cycle update, Mercury discontinued the Montego nameplate and expanded the Mercury Cougar line to include a full range of sedans and wagons (with the Ford Gran Torino becoming the Ford LTD II).

After a 28-year absence, the Montego nameplate was revived for the 2005 model year, this time applied to a full-size sedan. Marketed between the Mercury Milan and Grand Marquis, the 2005 Montego, internally code-named D333, was the Mercury counterpart of the Ford Five Hundred (D258). For the 2008 model year, the Montego adopted the nameplate of the car it had replaced, becoming the final generation of the Mercury Sable.

== First generation (1968–1971) ==
First generation (1968–1971)
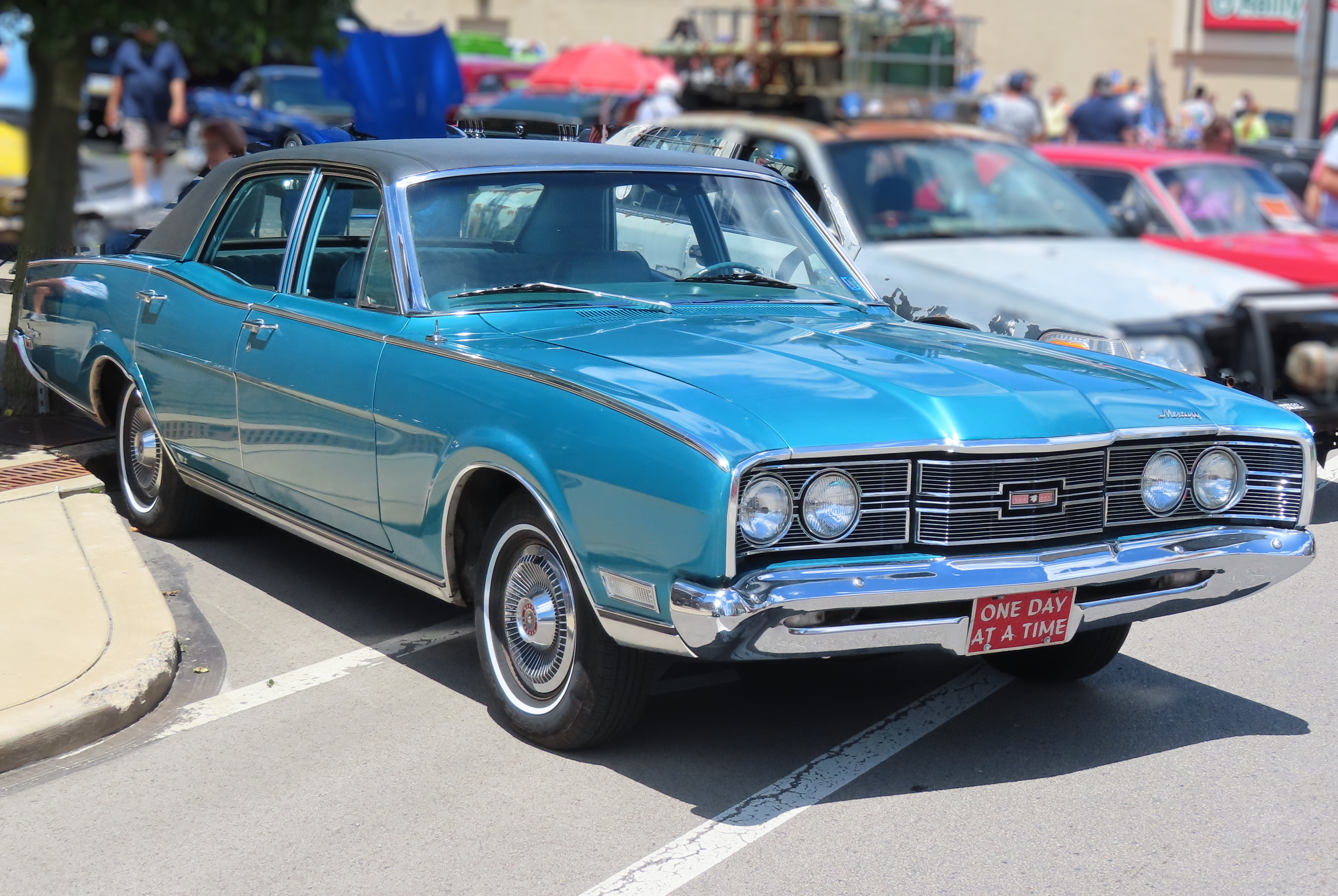
- 1969 Mercury Montego MX 4-door sedan

Overview
- Model years: 1968–1971

Body and chassis
- Class: Intermediate
- Body style: 2-door hardtop 2-door convertible 4-door sedan 4-door hardtop 5-door station wagon
- Related: Ford Fairlane/Torino

Powertrain
- Engine: 200 cu in (3.3 L) I6; 250 cu in (4.1 L) I6; 302 cu in (4.9 L) V8; 351 cu in (5.8 L) V8; 390 cu in (6.4 L) V8; 428 cu in (7.0 L) V8; 429 cu in (7.0 L) V8
- Transmission: 3-speed manual 4-speed manual 3-speed automatic

Dimensions
- Wheelbase: 116.0 in (2,946 mm) (sedans); 113.0 in (2,870 mm) (station wagons)
- Length: 206.1–209.9 in (5,235–5,331 mm) (sedans); 203.9–211.8 in (5,179–5,380 mm) (station wagons)
- Width: 76.0 in (1,930 mm)
- Height: 53.5 in (1,359 mm) (sedans); 55.0 in (1,397 mm) (sedans); 56.0 in (1,422 mm) (station wagons)

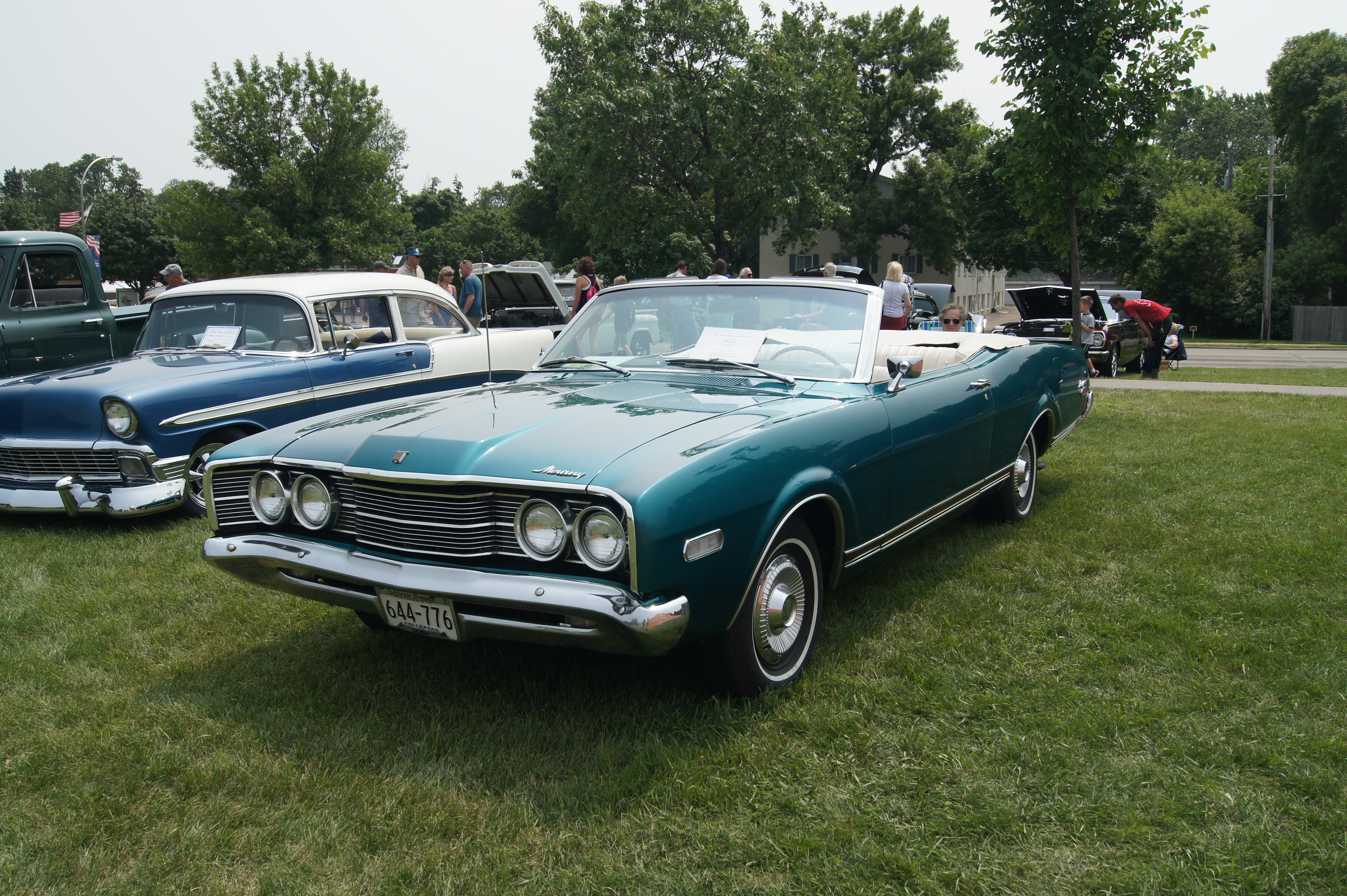
1968 Mercury Montego MX convertible

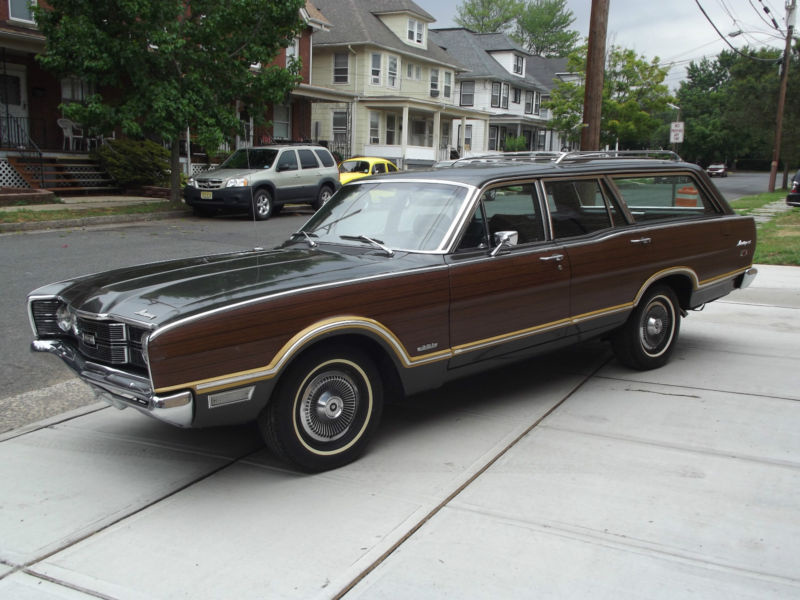
1969 Mercury Montego MX (optional "Yacht Panel" exterior trim)

For 1968, Mercury introduced the Montego as part of its intermediate Mercury Comet product line. While its predecessor was repackaged as an entry-level trim, the Montego (sharing its M-letter nameplate with full-size Mercury sedans) replaced the Comet Capri and Comet Caliente under a single nameplate; the high-performance Comet Cyclone became a stand-alone model line. The Montego was the counterpart of the Ford Torino (itself, phased in to replace the Ford Fairlane).

The first-generation Montego was initially offered in four body styles: two-door hardtop and two-door convertible, four-door sedan, and five-door station wagon. The model line was marketed in three trims: Montego and Montego MX (replacing the Comet Capri and Comet Caliente, respectively) and the Montego MX Brougham. For 1969, the 200 cubic-inch inline-6 was replaced as the standard by a 250 cubic-inch inline-6; a 351 V8 was added as an option (alongside the 302 and 390 V8s), in addition to a 428 Cobra Jet V8 (for non-MX Brougham vehicles).

=== 1970 facelift ===
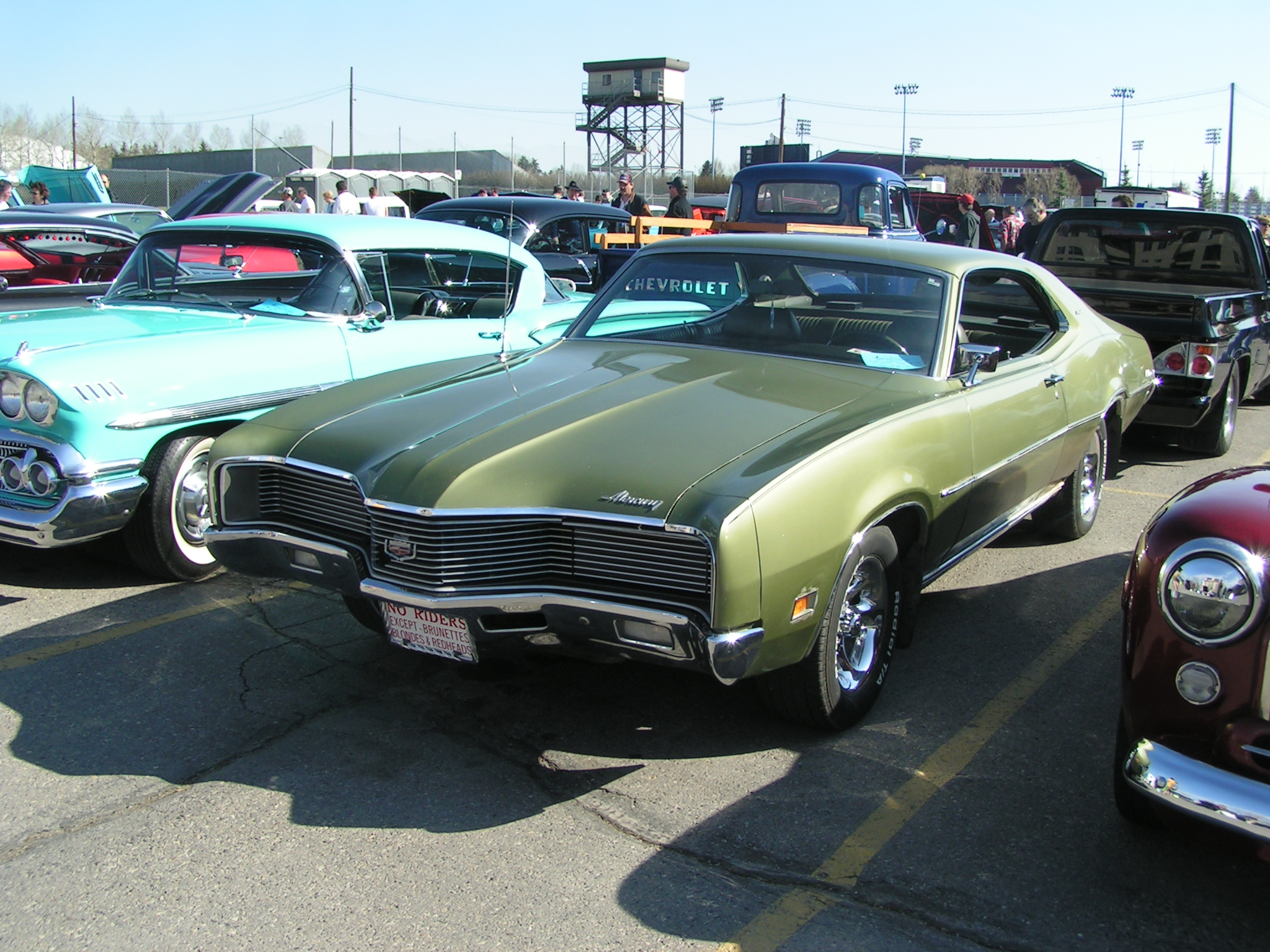
1970 Mercury Montego 2-door hardtop

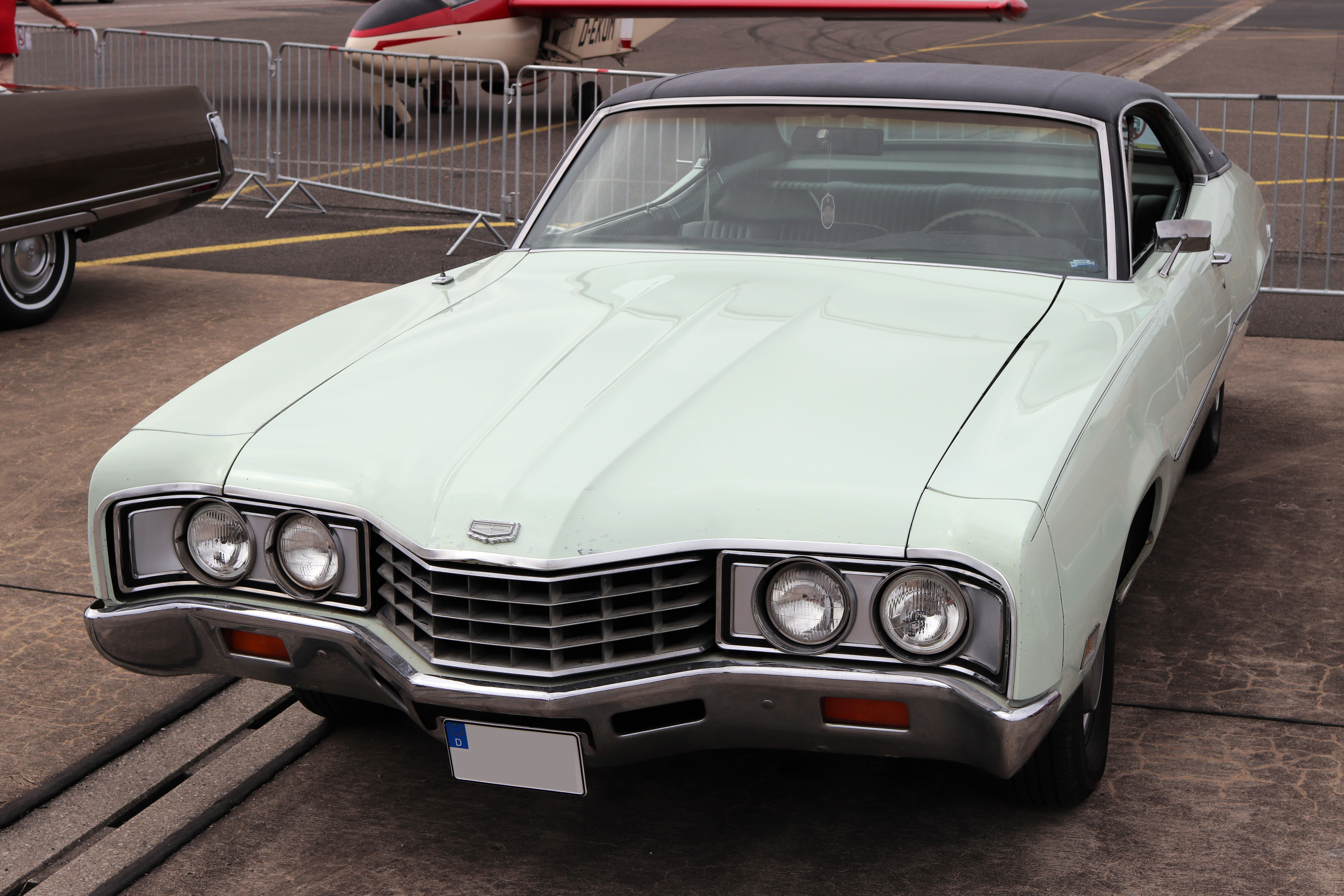
1971 Mercury Montego 2-door hardtop

For 1970, the Montego underwent a mid-cycle revision, with the Mercury intermediate range dropping the Comet name entirely. The chassis gained an inch of wheelbase (for both sedans and wagons), as the front fascia was styled with a forward-thrusting grille and hood (concealed headlamps on MX Brougham trim). The convertible was dropped from the model range, with the two-door hardtop adopting a sleeker roofline. Following the introduction of exterior wood-panel trim for Montego station wagons in 1969, Mercury added the Montego MX Villager (serving as the wagon equivalent of the MX Brougham). The V8 engine lineup was revised, dropping the 390 and 428 V8s (in favor of a 429 V8; high-performance versions were reserved for Mercury Cyclones) and replacing the 351 V8 with an all-new engine of the same displacement.

For 1971, the grille was restyled to an egg-crate style (retaining the forward-thrusting shape); the concealed headlamps were dropped from the MX Brougham/Villager. During the model year, Mercury began to add the Cyclone to the Montego line (as its Ford counterparts were all Torinos). The rest of the model line dropped the 429 V8, leaving the 351 Cleveland as the highest-performance V8.

== Second generation (1972–1976) ==
1972–1976
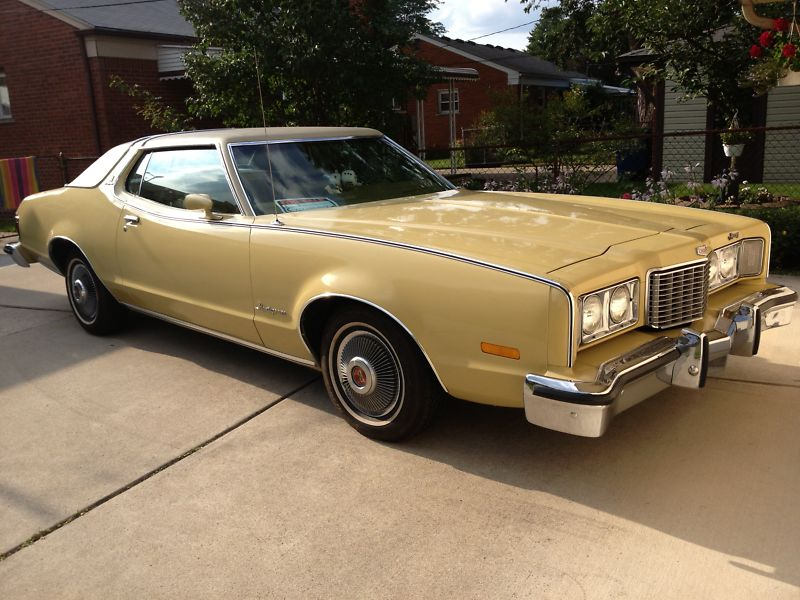
- 1974 Mercury Montego MX Brougham 2-Door Hardtop

Overview
- Production: 1972–1976

Body and chassis
- Class: Intermediate
- Body style: 4-door sedan 4-door station wagon 2-door hardtop coupe 2-door fastback coupe
- Layout: FR layout
- Related: Ford Torino; Ford Elite; Mercury Cougar

Powertrain
- Engine: 250 cu in (4.1 L) I6; 302 cu in (4.9 L) V8; 351 cu in (5.8 L) V8; 390 cu in (6.4 L) V8; 400 cu in (6.6 L) V8; 460 cu in (7.5 L) V8
- Transmission: 3-speed automatic 3-speed manual

Dimensions
- Wheelbase: 118.0 in (2,997 mm) (sedan, wagon); 114.0 in (2,896 mm) (coupe, convert.)
- Length: 223.1 in (5,667 mm) (sedan, wagon); 215.5 in (5,474 mm) (coupe, convert.)

Chronology
- Predecessor: Mercury Comet; Mercury Cyclone
- Successor: Mercury Cougar

For 1972, the second-generation Montego was introduced alongside the redesigned Ford Torino. In a major design shift, intermediate-size Ford/Mercury model lines shifted from unibody to body-on-frame construction; similarly to the General Motors A-platform, the Montego adopted a split-wheelbase chassis (114-inch for two-doors, 118-inch for four-doors and station wagons). True four-door hardtops were replaced by "pillared hardtops" (frameless door glass remained, supported by a thin B-pillar), while two-door Montegos retained hardtop roofs, though with much wider C-pillars.

The Cyclone had reverted from a stand-alone model line to an option package for 1972 for the Montego; only 30 1972 Cyclones would be produced, making it among the rarest Mercury vehicles. As a replacement for the Cyclone, Mercury introduced the Montego GT, a counterpart of the Ford Gran Torino SportsRoof for the first time; the Montego GT was offered from 1972 to 1973.

As a standard engine, the Montego was equipped with a 250 cubic-inch inline-six, with five different V8 engines available as options. Starting in 1974, the Mercury Montego was available with a 460 V8, shared with the Mercury Marquis/Colony Park.

The redesign was initially met with success, as 1972 Montego sales increased 136% over 1971; the MX Brougham saw the largest increases in sales, as the two-door increased its sales by 897% while the four-door increased by 1,021%. Following the 1973 gas crisis, sales of the model line began to trend lower in response to industry-wide fuel economy concerns.

For 1974, the Mercury Cougar XR7 adopted the body of the Montego two-door hardtop, now the counterpart of the Ford Elite, the Cougar was repackaged as an intermediate-size personal luxury car. While the notchback roofline remained for the two-door hardtop (though rear side windows became fixed in place, with an opera window added as an option), the fastback Montego GT hardtop was dropped.

For 1975, the engine lineup was revised, as all Ford/Mercury intermediates dropped the inline-6 and 302 V8; a 351 V8 became the standard engine, with optional 400 and 460 V8s. Sales of the Montego dropped further; in addition to the Cougar competing directly against the two-door Montego, the smaller Mercury Monarch attracted buyers shifting away from full-size and intermediate cars towards compact cars offering increased fuel efficiency.

For 1976, the Montego saw only nominal changes, centered primarily on improving fuel efficiency of the V8 engines. The Torino-chassis intermediates underwent a mid-cycle redesign for 1977, with Ford shifting several nameplates. Mercury rebranded the Montego as a fourth generation of the Cougar; in addition to the flagship Cougar XR7 personal luxury coupe, the Cougar offered two-door and four-door sedans and a station wagon. Following a substantial exterior revision, the Torino/Gran Torino was rebranded as the Ford LTD II, with the Ford Elite replaced by a downsized Ford Thunderbird (becoming a counterpart of the Cougar XR7).

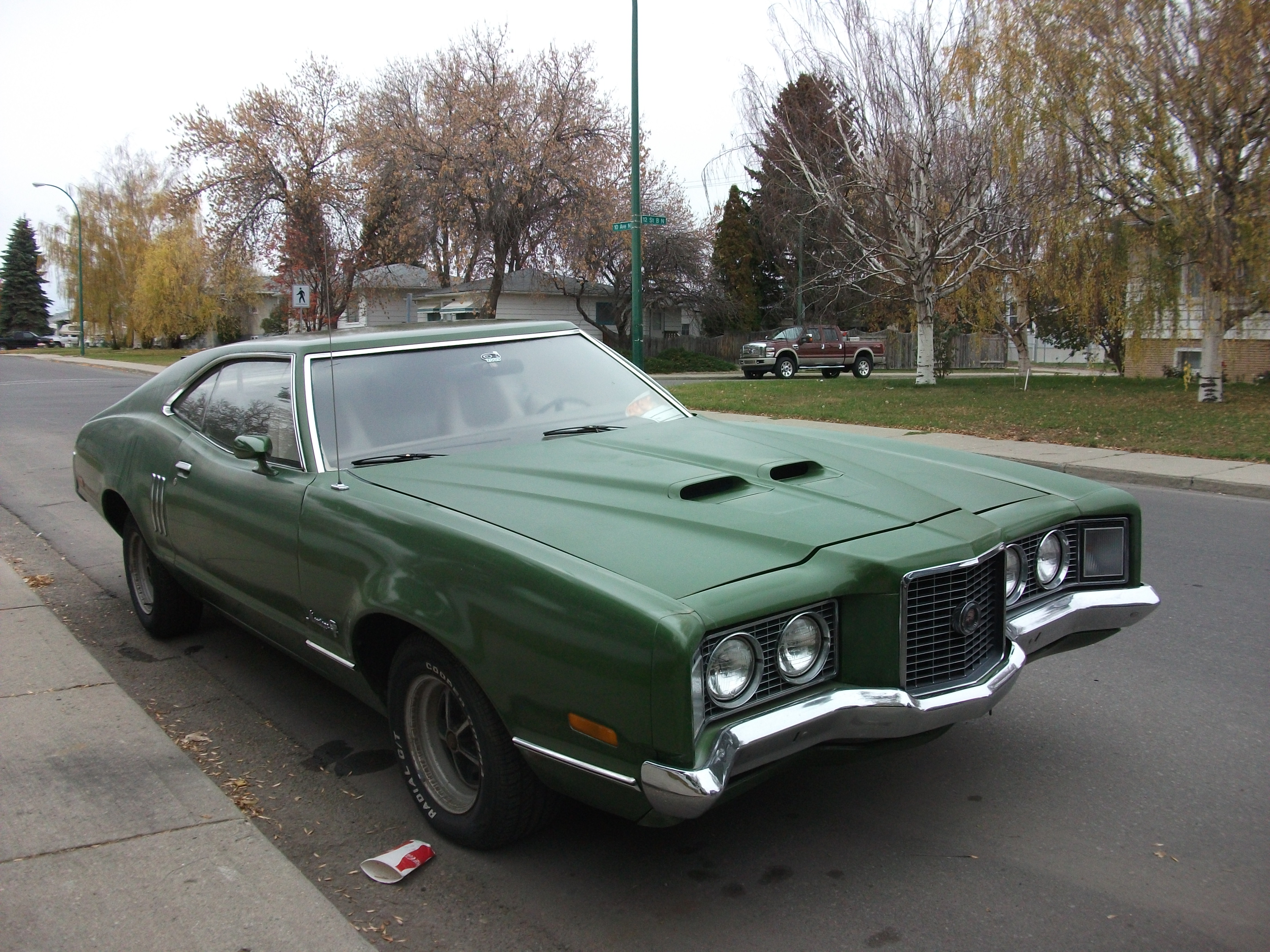
1972 Mercury Montego GT 2-Door Fastback

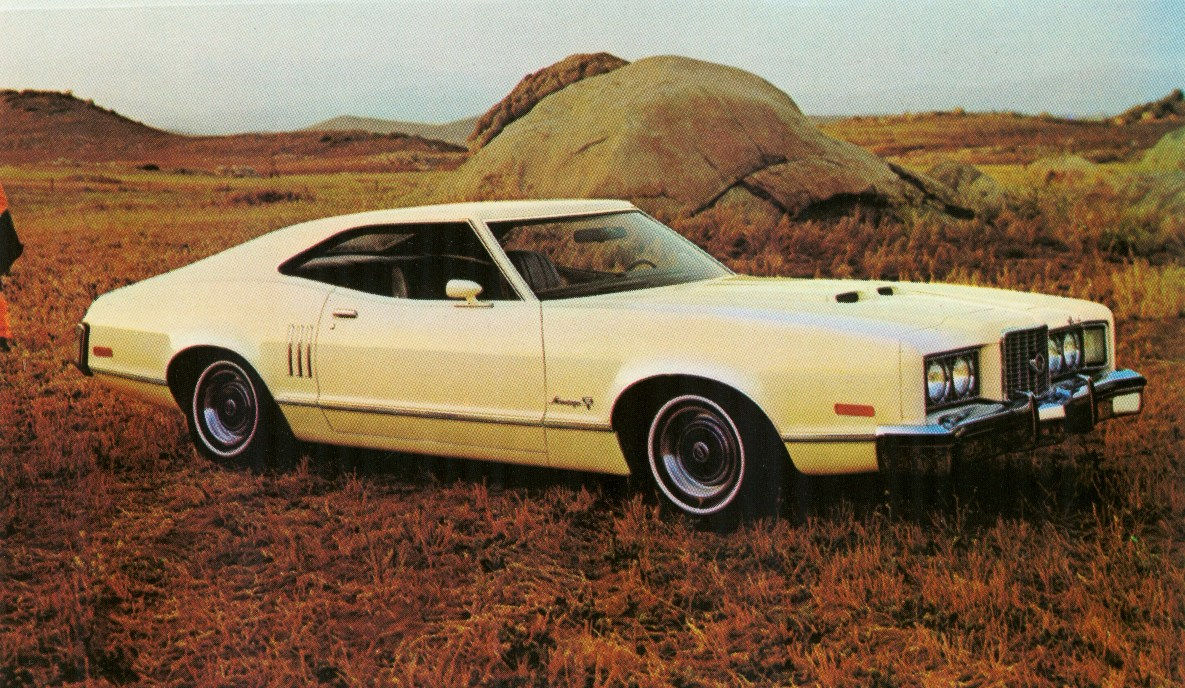
1973 Mercury Montego GT 2-Door Fastback

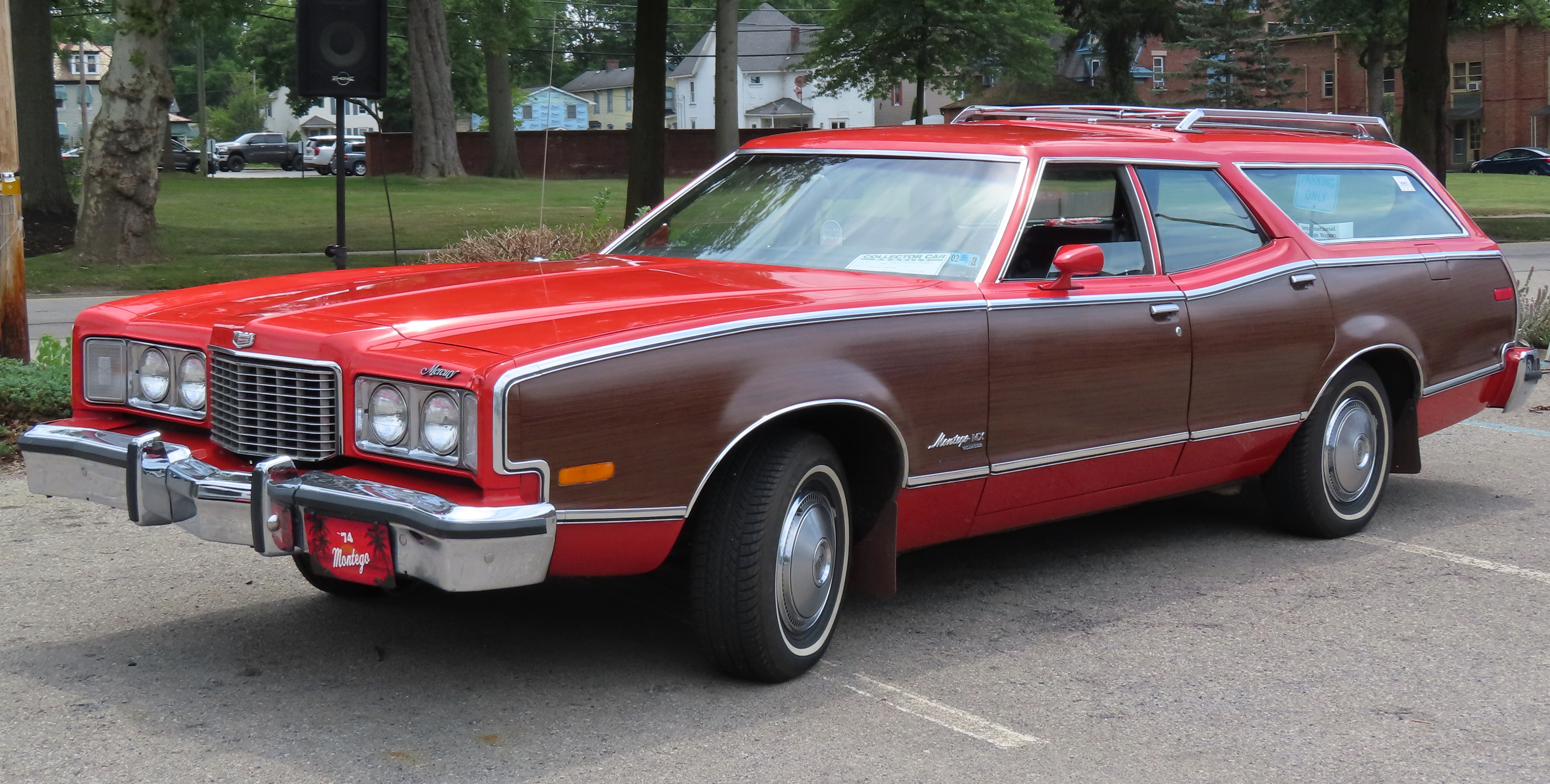
1974 Montego MX Villager station wagon

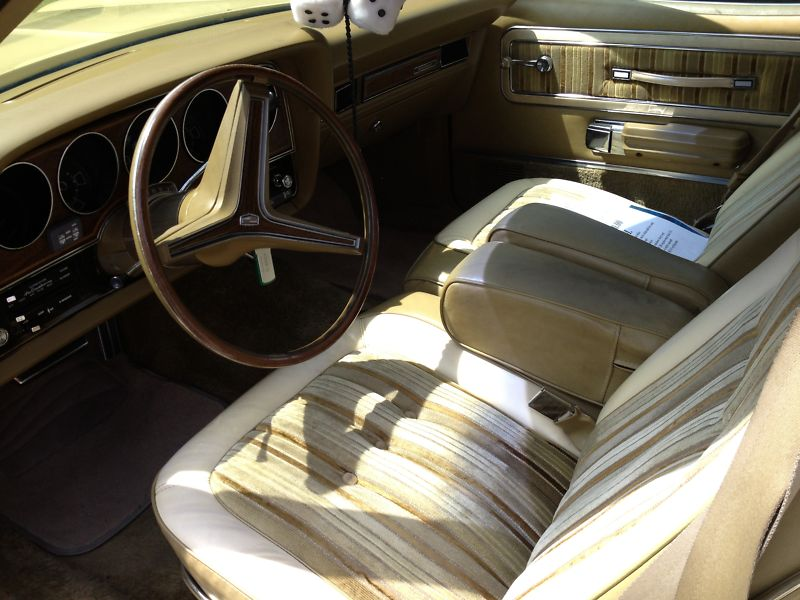
1974 Montego MX Brougham interior

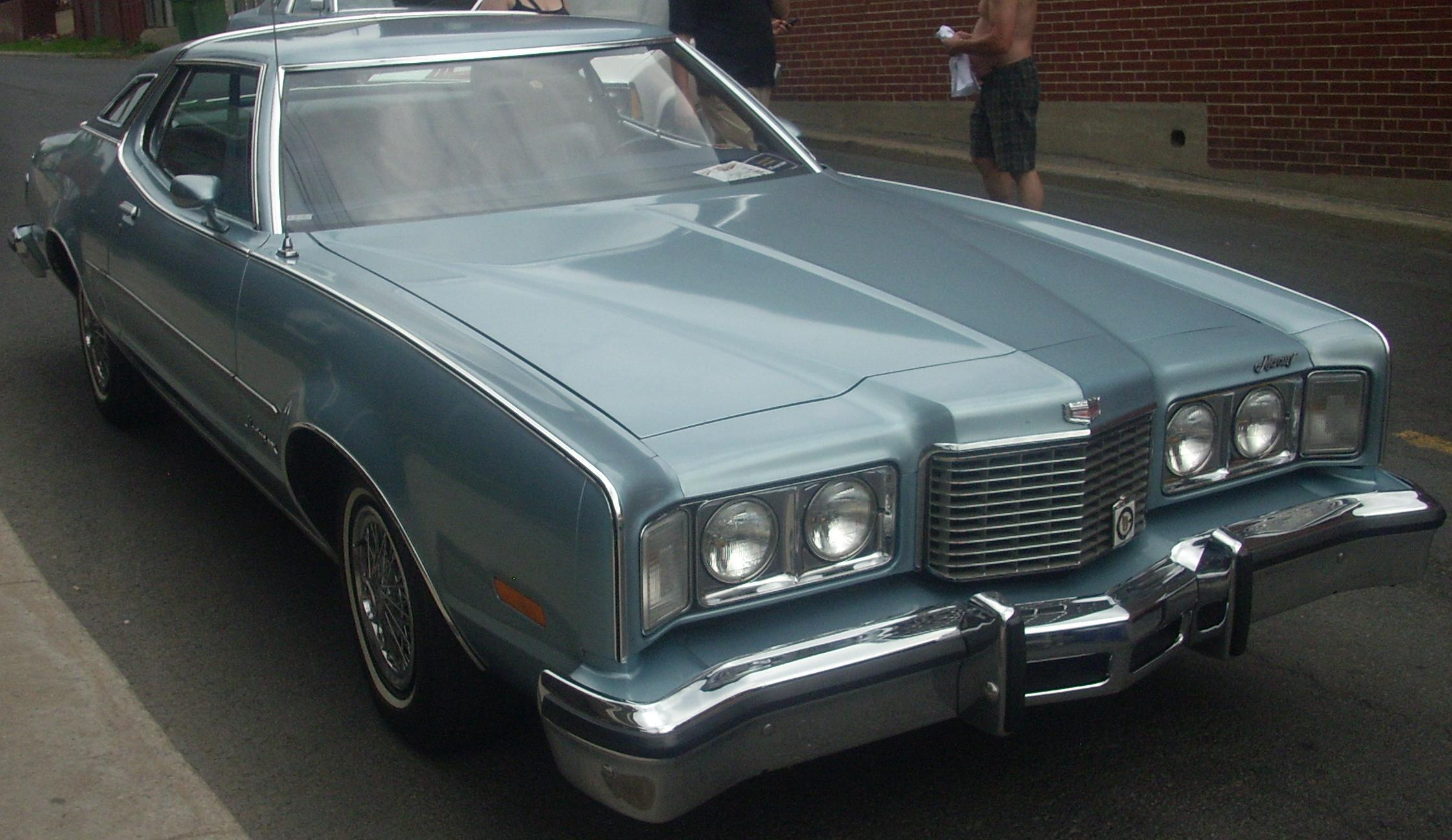
1975 Mercury Montego 2-Door Hardtop

== Third generation (2005–2007) ==
D333
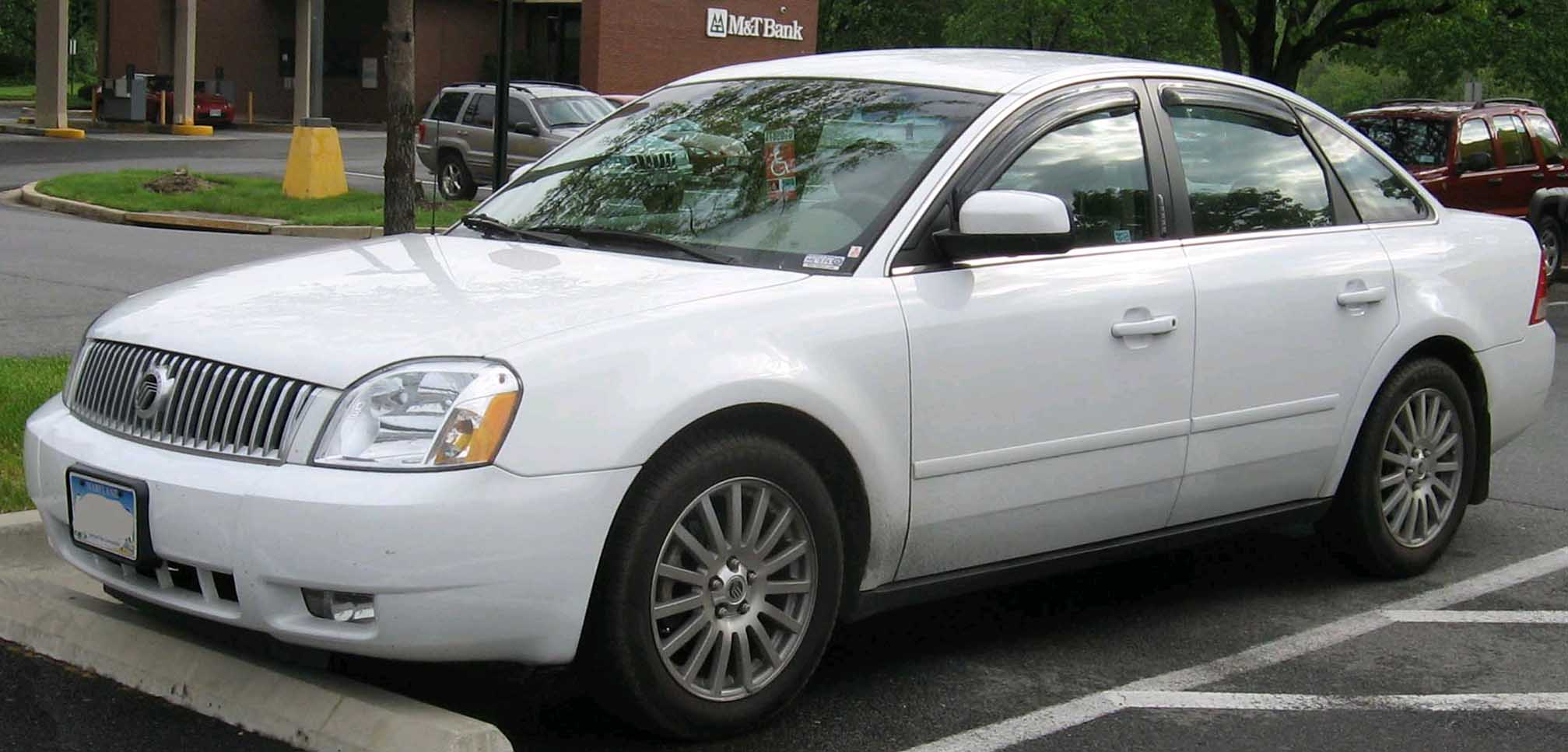
- 2005 Mercury Montego Premier

Overview
- Production: July 2004–April 2007
- Model years: 2005–2007
- Assembly: United States: Chicago, Illinois (Chicago Assembly)

Body and chassis
- Class: Full-size
- Body style: 4-door sedan
- Layout: FF layout/F4 layout (Transverse engine)
- Platform: Ford D3 platform
- Related: Ford Five Hundred; Ford Taurus; Ford Freestyle

Powertrain
- Engine: 3.0 L Duratec 30 V6 203 hp
- Transmission: Aisin TF-80SC 6-speed automatic; ZF Batavia CFT30 CVT

Dimensions
- Wheelbase: 112.9 in (2,868 mm)
- Length: 200.4 in (5,090 mm)
- Width: 74.5 in (1,892 mm)
- Height: 61.5 in (1,562 mm)

Chronology
- Predecessor: Mercury Sable
- Successor: Mercury Sable

After a 28-year hiatus, Mercury revived the Montego nameplate for 2005, moving it to a full-size sedan. Introduced as the successor of the Mercury Sable (alongside the smaller Mercury Milan), the Montego was slotted between the Milan and Grand Marquis in size. The divisional counterpart of the Ford Five Hundred, the model line entered production on July 12, 2004.

The third-generation Montego was manufactured at the Chicago Assembly facility in Chicago, Illinois alongside the Ford Five Hundred and the Ford Freestyle; the latter was a CUV wagon serving as a replacement for the Taurus/Sable station wagon.

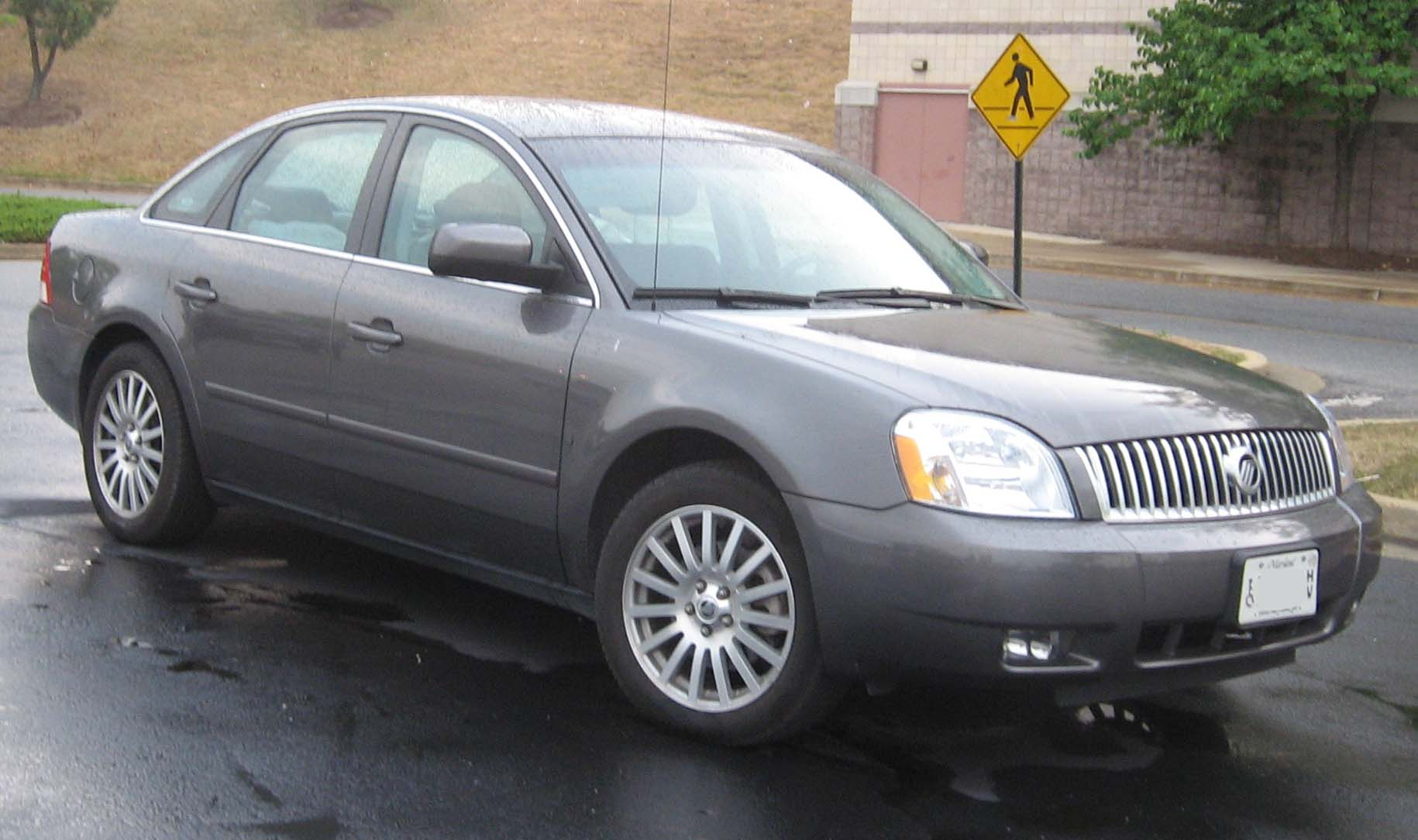
2005 Mercury Montego

=== Design ===
The third-generation Montego used the Ford D3 platform. Developed in collaboration with Volvo, the D3 platform is the first full-size Ford platform to use front-wheel drive, with all-wheel drive as an option. Shifting away from the body-on-frame Panther platform, the D3 chassis utilizes unibody construction. Only two inches shorter than the Grand Marquis in wheelbase, the Montego was nearly 500 pounds lighter in curb weight.

The Montego was equipped with a single engine, shared with the previous Taurus/Sable, a 203hp version of the 3.0L DOHC Duratec V6. Front-wheel drive versions were equipped with an Aisin 6-speed automatic; AWD versions were equipped with a CVT sourced from a Ford/ZF joint venture.

==== Total Vehicle Geometry (TVG) ====
The Montego, Five Hundred and Ford Freestyle were manufactured using a Volvo-derived system called Total Vehicle Geometry (TVG) to ensure fit, finish and craftsmanship — by requiring comprehensive participation by all engineers as well as suppliers and vendors. Heavily using computer-aided design, TVG tracks all design modifications, translating them into the central CAD database which in turn allows each engineer access to current project data. The system improves part tolerance at the body-in-white stage as well as early cabin integrity testing, via air leakage testing. TVG improved fit and finish at the first prototype stage and decreases pilot manufacturing times.

For side impact protection the bodywork is braced at the B-pillar via an energy-channeling structural cross-car roof tube and a corresponding undercar energy channelling cross-tube — with the front seats mounted above the lower tube, locating them above a side impact energy path. The system derives from a side-impact safety design marketed by Volvo as its Side Impact Protection System (SIPS).

=== Exterior ===
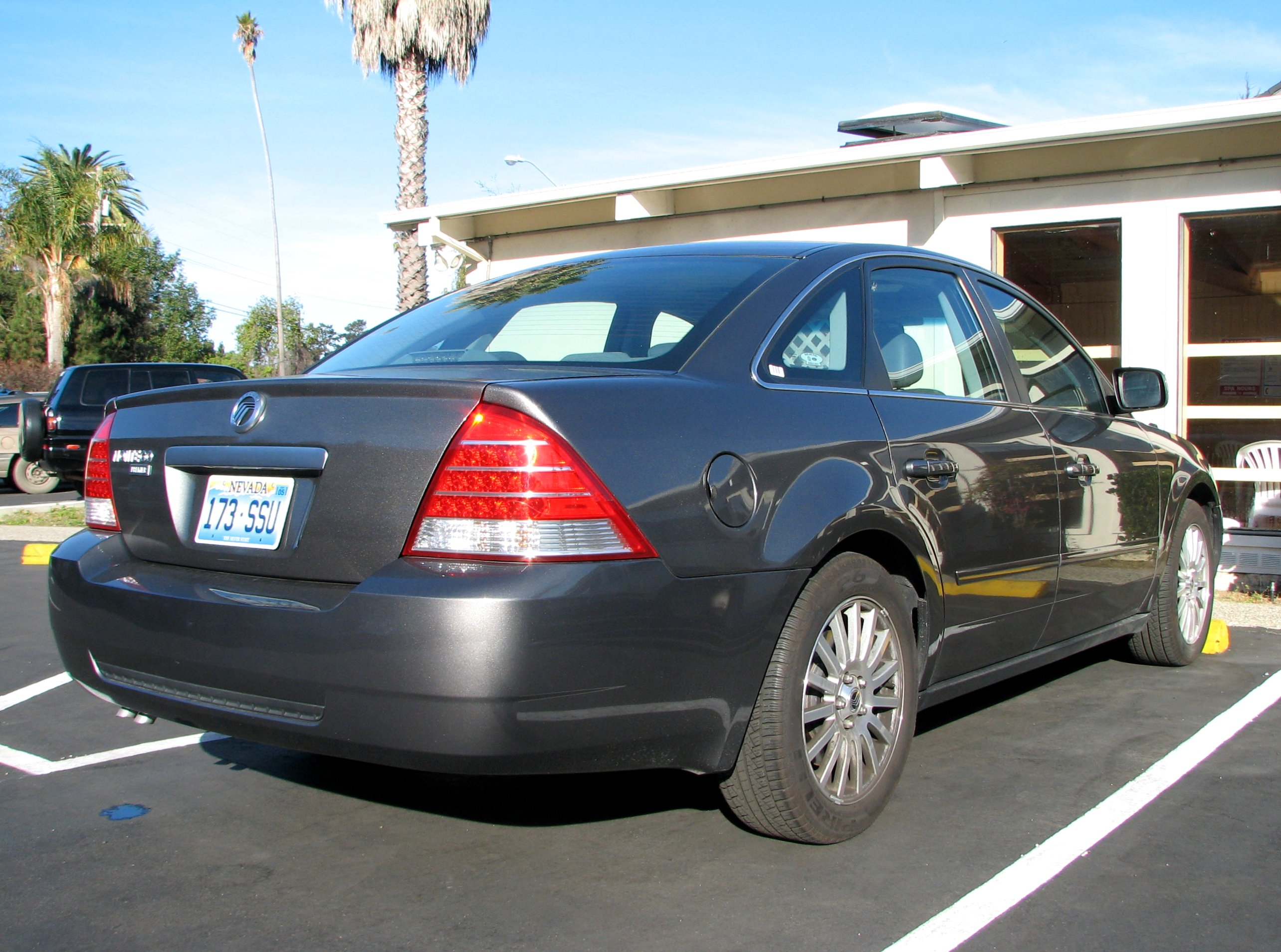
2005 Mercury Montego, rear

As with the Grand Marquis, the 2005 Montego was offered solely as a four-door sedan. The tallest Mercury sedan in over 50 years (over five feet tall), the Montego was only two inches lower in height than a Jeep Cherokee SUV.

While visibly sharing much of its exterior with its Ford Five Hundred counterpart, the third-generation Montego held several distinct design features. In Mercury design tradition, the Montego was styled with a vertical waterfall-style grille with satin aluminum exterior trim (limiting chrome to the roofline). Exclusive to the Montego, HID headlamps and LED taillamps were standard equipment (the latter, the largest array of LED lights on any Ford vehicle worldwide).

Ford chief designer George Bucher said: "It was a challenge to sculpt a Ford-styled body around a Volvo chassis", and added that designers used what he calls "plainer surfaces with taut lines to give the car a modern look without losing its passenger-car proportions."

=== Interior ===
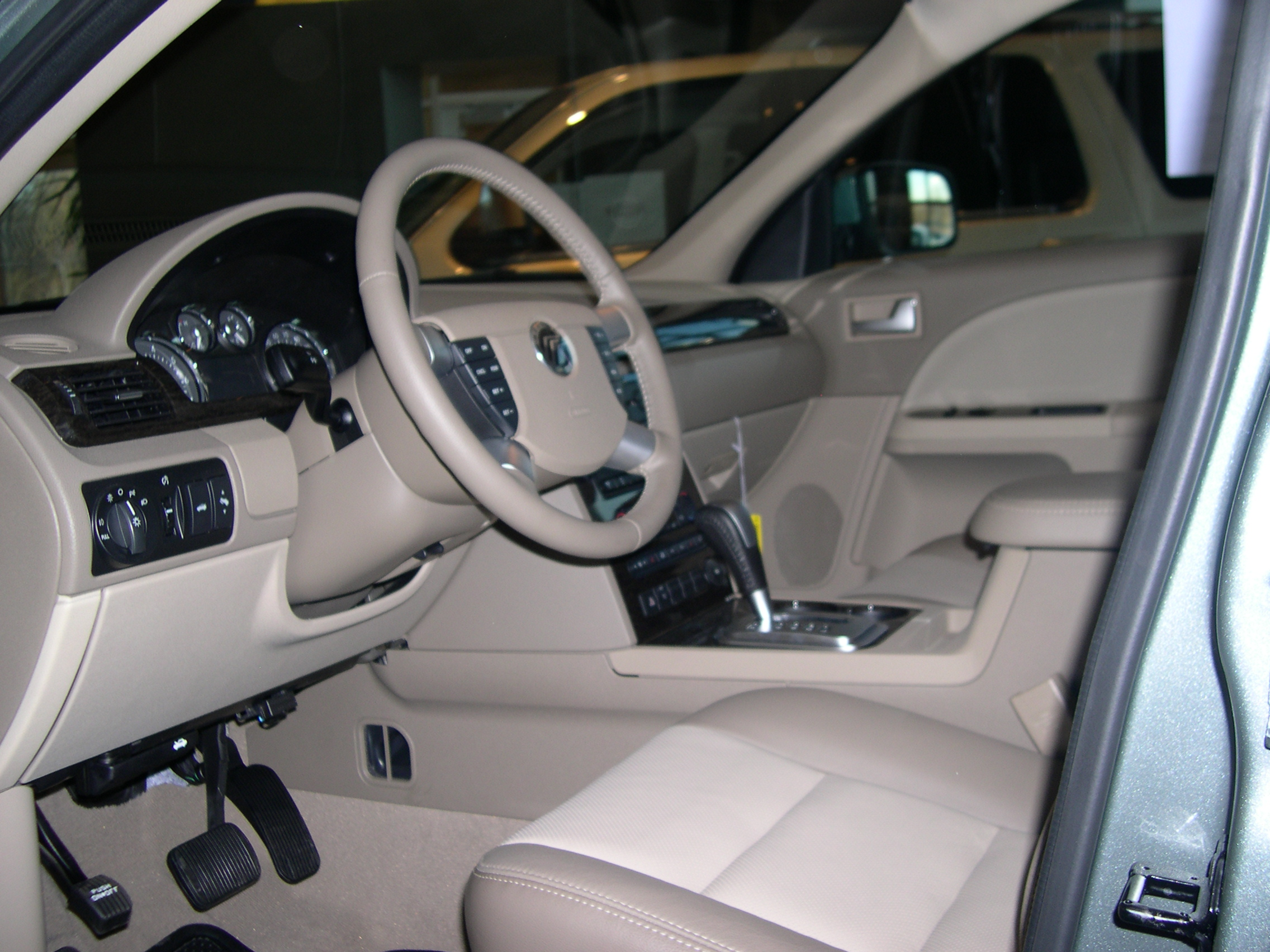
Interior

Contrasting with both the Grand Marquis and the Sable, the third-generation Montego was available solely in a five-passenger configuration. As with the Mercury Marauder (and the Grand Marquis LSE), the Montego was fitted with a console-mounted transmission shifter. As with the Milan, the Montego was fitted with a 60/40 fold-down rear seat. Along with expanding the 21 cubic-foot trunk space, the folding rear seats (and optional forward-folding front passenger seatback) allowed for objects up to 10 feet in length to be transported inside.

At its launch, two airbags were standard, with four more available as an option (front-seat airbags and side-curtain).

A design feature of the Montego includes its overall height to add interior space to the vehicle. To appeal to buyers of both sedans and sport-utility vehicles, Ford raised the viewpoint of the driver. Marketed as Command Seating, the Montego features high H-point seating (the location of the occupants hip-point relative to the road or the vehicle floor); its H-point is closer to the ground than that of a sport utility vehicle, but higher than a typical sedan, easing entry and exit. Also, the distance from the H-point to the floor of the vehicle is reflective of more upright seating. At its press launch, Ford said the Five Hundred's H-point is up to four and a half inches higher than its competitors. The Montego also features theater seating, where second row seats are higher: in the front row, the distance between the H-point and the heel point, where the occupant's foot touches the floor, is 12.7 inches — in the second row the distance between the H-point and the heel point is 15.7 inches.

=== Trim ===
In place of the three trims of the Five Hundred, Mercury marketed two trims of the Montego: Luxury and Premier.

Slotted in between the Five Hundred SE and SEL, the Montego Luxury featured cloth seats as standard, with leather seats as optional.

The Mercury equivalent of a Five Hundred Limited, the Montego Premier, featured leather seats as standard; all-wheel drive and a sunroof were among the few available options.

=== Sales ===
Calendar Year	American sales
2004	2,974
2005	27,007
2006	22,332
2007	10,755

=== Discontinuation ===
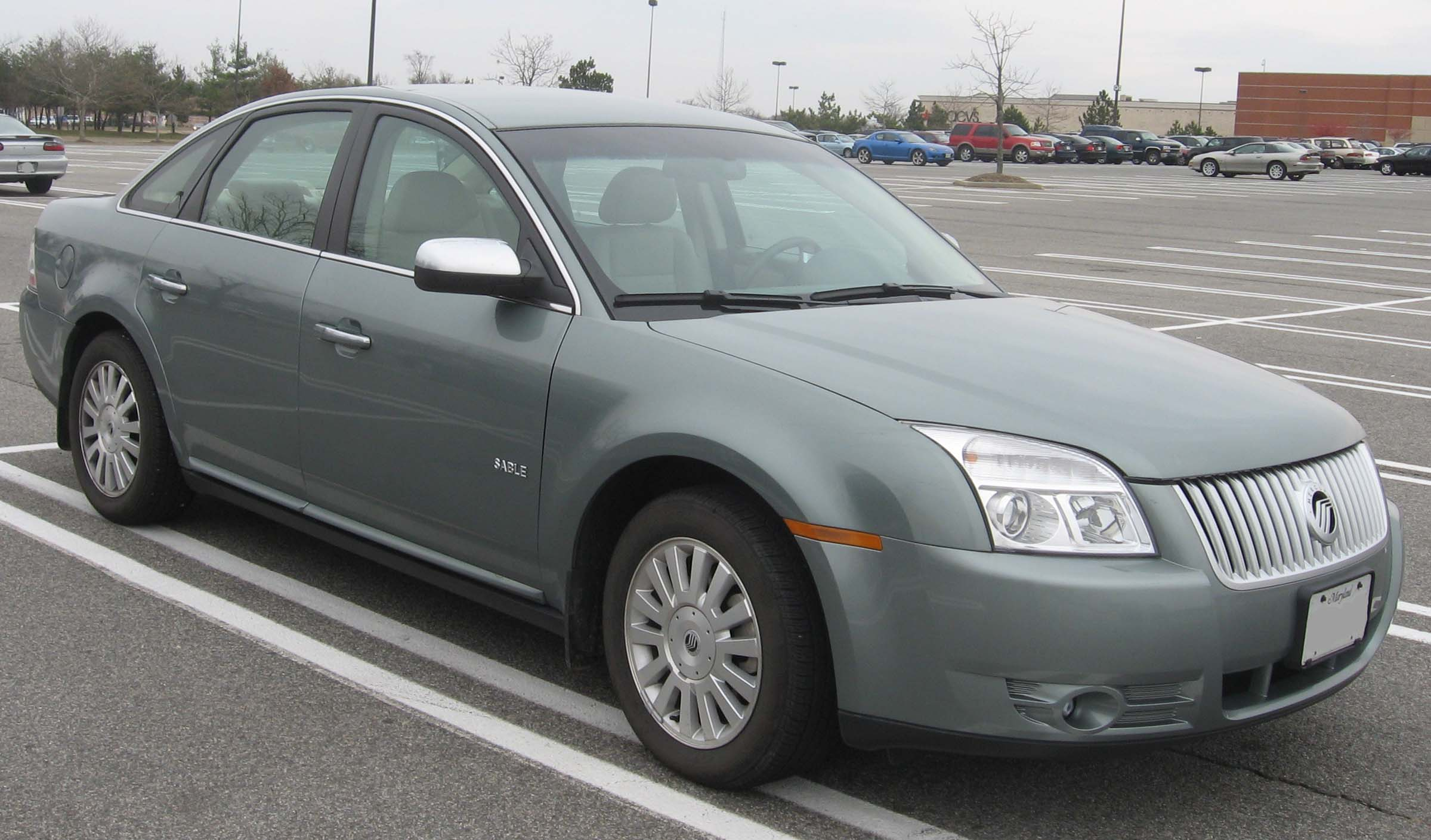
2008 Mercury Sable

Following a poor critical reception, the Mercury Montego and Ford Five Hundred fell under sales projections from the 2005 to 2007 model years. For the 2008 model year, the Montego and Five Hundred underwent a mid-cycle update, with pre-production prototypes unveiled at 2007 auto shows. Along with evolutionary changes to the body, the powertrain underwent a series of upgrades, as a 263hp 3.5L V6 became the standard engine; both previous transmissions were replaced by a Ford-sourced 6-speed automatic.

The exterior received new bodywork forward of the windshield (to better distinguish the two model lines), with a revised rear fascia (clear-lens taillamps; license plate relocated to rear bumper). The interior saw minor trim revisions; the windshield wiper controls were moved from their previous stalk to the left-side column stalk.

After his installation as Ford CEO, Alan Mulally ordered the model lines renamed before entering production, claiming higher brand value and recognition. For 2008, the Montego was renamed the Sable, taking on the nameplate of the vehicle that it originally replaced.

== Use in competition ==
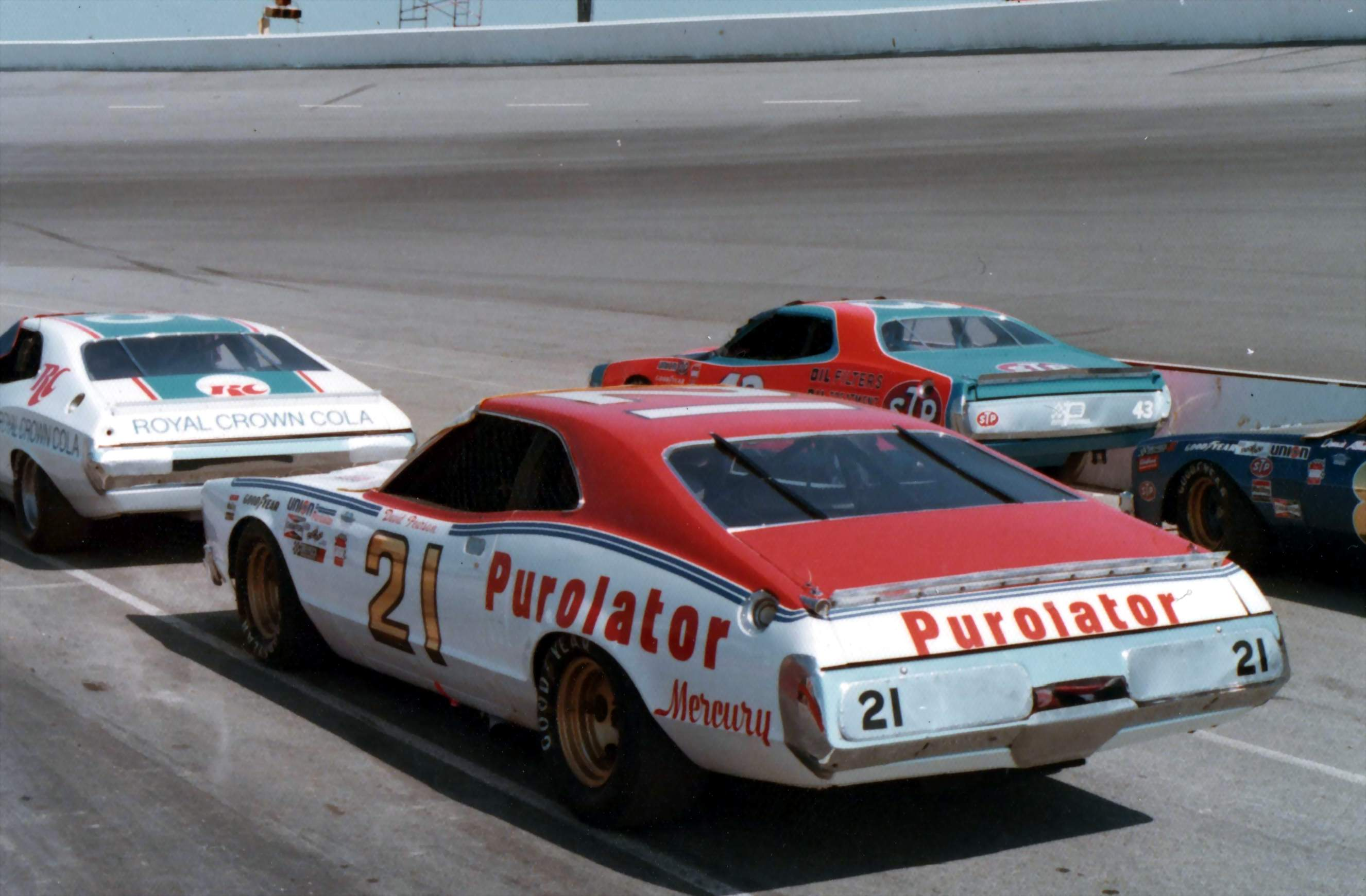
A Mercury Montego fielded by Wood Brothers Racing.

In the 1968 NASCAR Grand National stock car season, the fastback Fairlane body style proved much slicker than other makes, but the nose of the Mercury Cyclone Fastback was the main reason pointed to it being even slightly faster than its Ford counterpart. Cale Yarborough drove a Wood Brothers Cyclone to victory in the Daytona 500, and the Mercury bodies would remain a major force in NASCAR through 2 generations of bodies.

The battle over aerodynamics would prompt Chrysler to respond with specialized "winged wonder" Daytona and Superbird bodies after its own fastback bodies proved disappointing.
