= Los Angeles Assembly =

Former Ford assembly plant in Pico Rivera, California, USA

Coordinates: 33.9830°N 118.1004°W

Los Angeles Assembly was an American Ford Motor Company assembly plant located at 8820 Washington Boulevard and Rosemead Boulevard, in Pico Rivera, southeastern Los Angeles County, California.

== Ford plant ==
Known as Los Angeles Plant #2, the Pico Rivera facility started operations in early August 1957 with the production of 1958 Edsel Corsair and Citation hardtop models. Due to the paint booths not being ready, early Edsel bodies were welded together at the new Los Angeles #2 plant and then trucked to the old Maywood, Los Angeles #1 plant where they could be painted. The bodies were then trucked back to Pico Rivera where they were trimmed out and assembled. In mid September 1957, Mercury production commenced at Los Angeles #2. By December 3, 1957, Edsel production at the Los Angeles plants was discontinued. In March 1959, Ford Division's Long Beach Assembly plant was deemed unsafe and operations were moved to Los Angeles #2 with production starting on April 10, 1959. Through the remainder of 1959 up to the end of the 1962 model year, both Ford and Mercury full-size cars were assembled at the Los Angeles plant. Ford Division's Los Angeles Regional offices were also located at the Pico Rivera assembly plant.

In February 1962, full-size Mercury cars were discontinued at Pico Rivera/Los Angeles replaced by the compact Comets, while full-size Ford cars continued to be assembled on the same assembly lines. In 1963 both Ford Falcon compacts and full-size Fords were assembled at Los Angeles in addition to Mercury Comets. For 1964 and 1965, Pico Rivera/Los Angeles assembled full-size Fords and the compact Mercury Comet. This pattern would continue until the end of the 1967 model year. For 1968 the Los Angeles plant assembled both full-size Ford cars as well as Thunderbirds and continued to build these two lines through the end of 1971 model year. Throughout the 1970s, Pico Rivera continued to produce full-size Fords up through the end of the 1978 model year. For the 1979 model year Ford's Fairmont and Mercury's Zephyr passenger cars were assembled at Los Angeles and would continue with these two models up until the final car was assembled in July 1979.

Ford closed its Los Angeles Assembly plant at Pico Rivera on January 31, 1980, as part of a corporate-wide elimination of regional assembly plants, in an ongoing effort to streamline production by shifting assembly to factories situated closer to suppliers, transport links, and customers.

== Northrop Corporation ==
After closure, the plant was then purchased by Northrop Corporation in 1982 where they established their "Advanced Systems Division," which was a cover for the development of the Northrop Grumman B-2 Spirit stealth bomber. Many of the Los Angeles Assembly workers were rehired by Northrop.

== Shopping center ==
The Northrop site was demolished in 2001, and is now the Pico Rivera Town Center.

== See also ==
- List of Ford factories
