= Mercury Marauder =

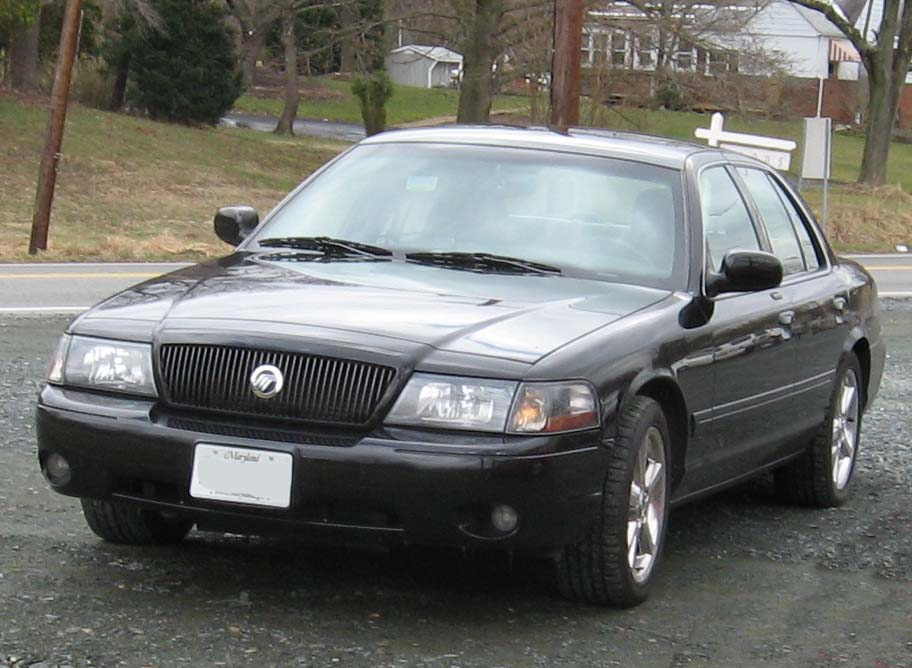
- 2003–2004 Mercury Marauder

Overview
- Manufacturer: Mercury (Ford)
- Production: 1963–1965; 1969–1970; 2002–2004
- Model years: 1963–1965; 1969–1970; 2003–2004

Body and chassis
- Class: Full-size
- Layout: FR layout

The Mercury Marauder is an automobile nameplate that was used for three distinct full-size cars produced by the Mercury division of Ford Motor Company. Deriving its name from the most powerful engines available to the Mercury line, the Marauder was marketed as the highest-performance version of the full-size product range.

Introduced as a 1963 1/2 model line for its first production run, the Mercury Marauder was distinguished by its sloped roofline (shared with the Ford Galaxie). The nameplate was a sub-model of the three Mercury model lines (Monterey, Monterey Custom, and S-55).

For the 1966 model year, the Marauder was replaced by the S-55 as a stand-alone model line, making it the Mercury counterpart of the Ford Galaxie 500 XL version.

The Marauder model name returned as a fastback-like version of the Mercury Marquis for the 1969 model year. It was positioned as a personal luxury car between the Mercury Cougar and Continental Mark III. Following the 1970 model year, the Marauder model was discontinued.

The Mercury Marauder nameplate was revived for the 2003 model year as a high-performance variant of the full-size Grand Marquis using the Ford Panther platform. After lower-than-expected sales, the Marauder was discontinued at the end of the 2004 model year. The Mercury Marauder became the last rear-wheel drive sedan introduced by Ford Motor Company in North America.

== Origin of name ==
The Marauder name made its first appearance in 1958 as Ford introduced a new family of V8s, the MEL engines, for its Mercury, Edsel, and Lincoln brands; the Marauder nameplate was in reference to people associated with outlaws or piracy. Within the Ford engine versions, two V8 engines were exclusive to the Mercury division.

Dubbed Marauder, a 383 cu in (6.3 L) V8 was rated at 330 hp (246 kW; 335 PS) when equipped with an optional four-barrel carburetor. This Marauder engine version was also optional in Mercury's midline Montclair models and the Colony Park station wagon.

Dubbed Super Marauder, a 430 cu in (7.0 L) V8 was rated at 400 hp (298 kW; 406 PS) making it the first mass-produced engine sold in the United States with an advertised 400 hp output. While the 430 V8 engine block was shared with Lincoln, the Super Marauder featured a unique intake manifold and "tri-power" 3x2-barrel carburetors. Offered for the entire Mercury line, the Super Marauder was developed as a competitor for the 392 Hemi of the Chrysler 300C high-performance coupe.

For 1959, Mercury revised its V8 engine offerings; while the Super Marauder version was discontinued, the regular 430 V8s with reduced engine output were available. For the 1960 model year, the Marauder V8 became an option across the entire Mercury line, including the Monterey, Park Lane, and Commuter.

Beginning with the 1960 model year, the full-size Mercury vehicles adopted a greater degree of commonality with their Ford counterparts, with Mercury dropping the 383 and 430 large-block engines entirely. The Marauder name returned, but now equipped with the Ford-based FE V8 engines.

== First generation (1963–1965) ==
First generation
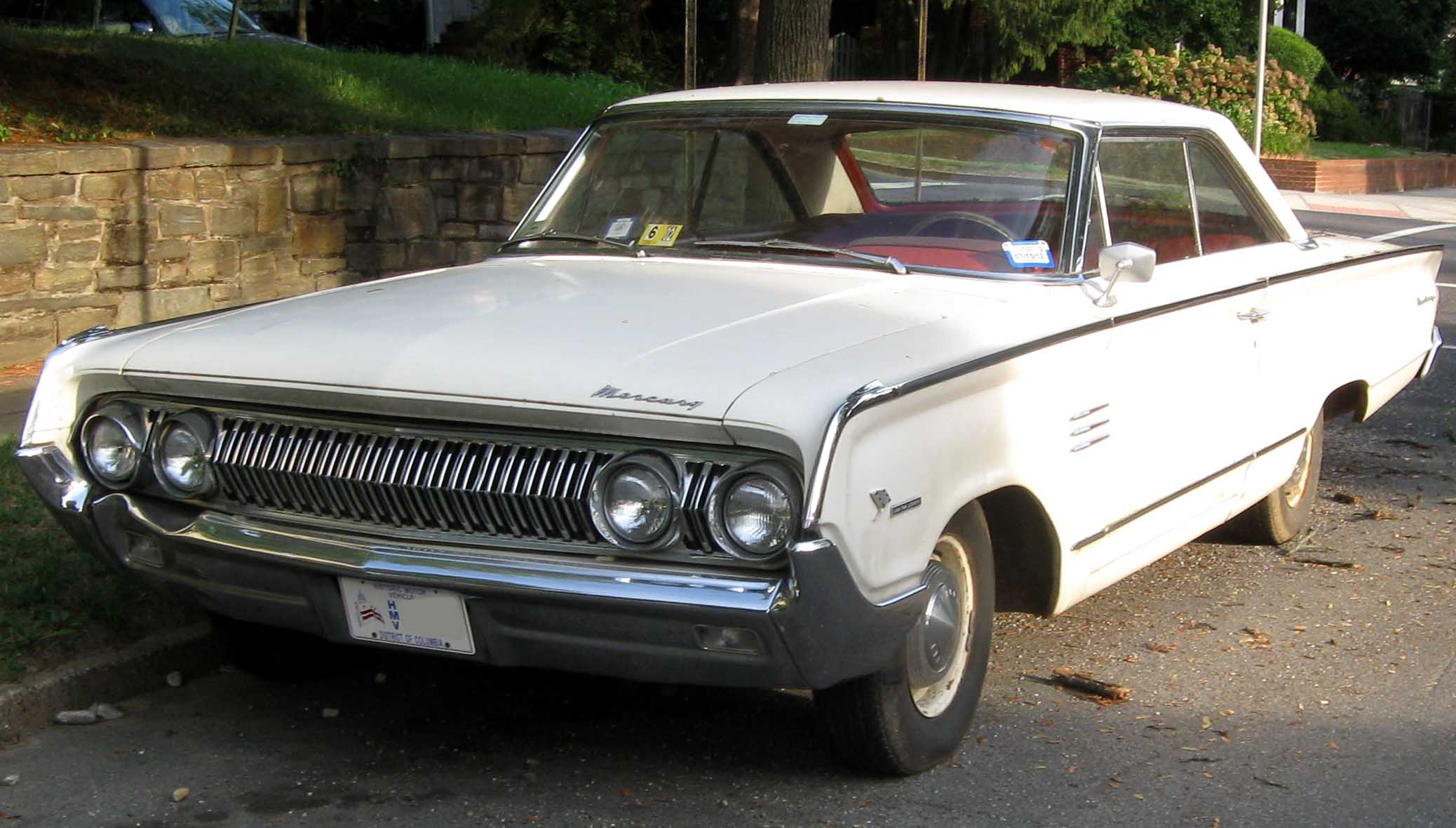
- 1964 Mercury Marauder 2-door hardtop

Overview
- Model years: 1963 1/2–1965
- Assembly: Main plant Wayne, Michigan (Branch assembly); Metuchen, New Jersey; Pico Rivera, California; Hazelwood, Missouri

Body and chassis
- Body style: 2-door hardtop 4-door hardtop
- Platform: Full-size Ford
- Related: Mercury Monterey; Mercury Montclair; Mercury Park Lane

Powertrain
- Engine: 390 cu in (6.4 L) V8; 406 cu in (6.7 L) V8; 427 cu in (7.0 L) V8
- Transmission: 3-speed manual; 4-speed manual; 3-speed automatic

The Mercury Marauder nameplate made its debut in 1963 1/2 as a model of each of the three Mercury full-size series, including the Monterey, Monterey Custom, and S-55. For the first time for a mid-year introduction, the Marauder was introduced as a "1963 1/2" model (as was an entire line of new "sports" models from Ford in many of the existing series). All 1963 1/2 Marauders were offered only in two-door pillarless hardtop body styles. The two-door notchback hardtop coupe was listed at US$3,650 ($38,385 in 2025 dollars) and 3,863 were manufactured. For the 1964 model year, the Marauder was available in the base Monterey trim, next-level Montclair, or top-of-the-line Parklane. Marauders were now available as four-door cars.

In contrast to the distinctive reverse-slant "Breezeway" roofline option on Mercury's full-size models, the Marauder hardtop coupe was styled with a conventional sloping notchback rear roofline. It was the same roofline introduced at the same time on the contemporary Ford Galaxies. This roofline was optimized to make the large sedan more competitive for stock car racing. Along with the "sportier" roofline, the Marauder S-55 trim package included bucket seats and a center console, similar to its Ford counterpart. However, the base model Marauder came with a front bench seat and a column shift, unlike the S-55 package.

For 1964, the availability of Marauder expanded to include the two-door hardtop and two four-door hardtop versions, a notchback roofline, and the "Breezeway" roofline design available across full-size Mercury models.

Shared with the rest of the Mercury sedan line, the Mercury Marauder was powered by Ford "FE-Series" V8 engines, shared with the big Fords and the Thunderbird. A 390 cu in (6.4 L) Marauder V8 was standard, with an optional 427 cu in (7.0 L) V8 with a four-barrel or in a "Super Marauder" version featuring two four-barrel carburetors. A three-speed manual transmission was standard, with the three-speed "Merc-O-Matic" automatic transmission optional, as well as a four-speed manual that was mandatory with the 427 engines.

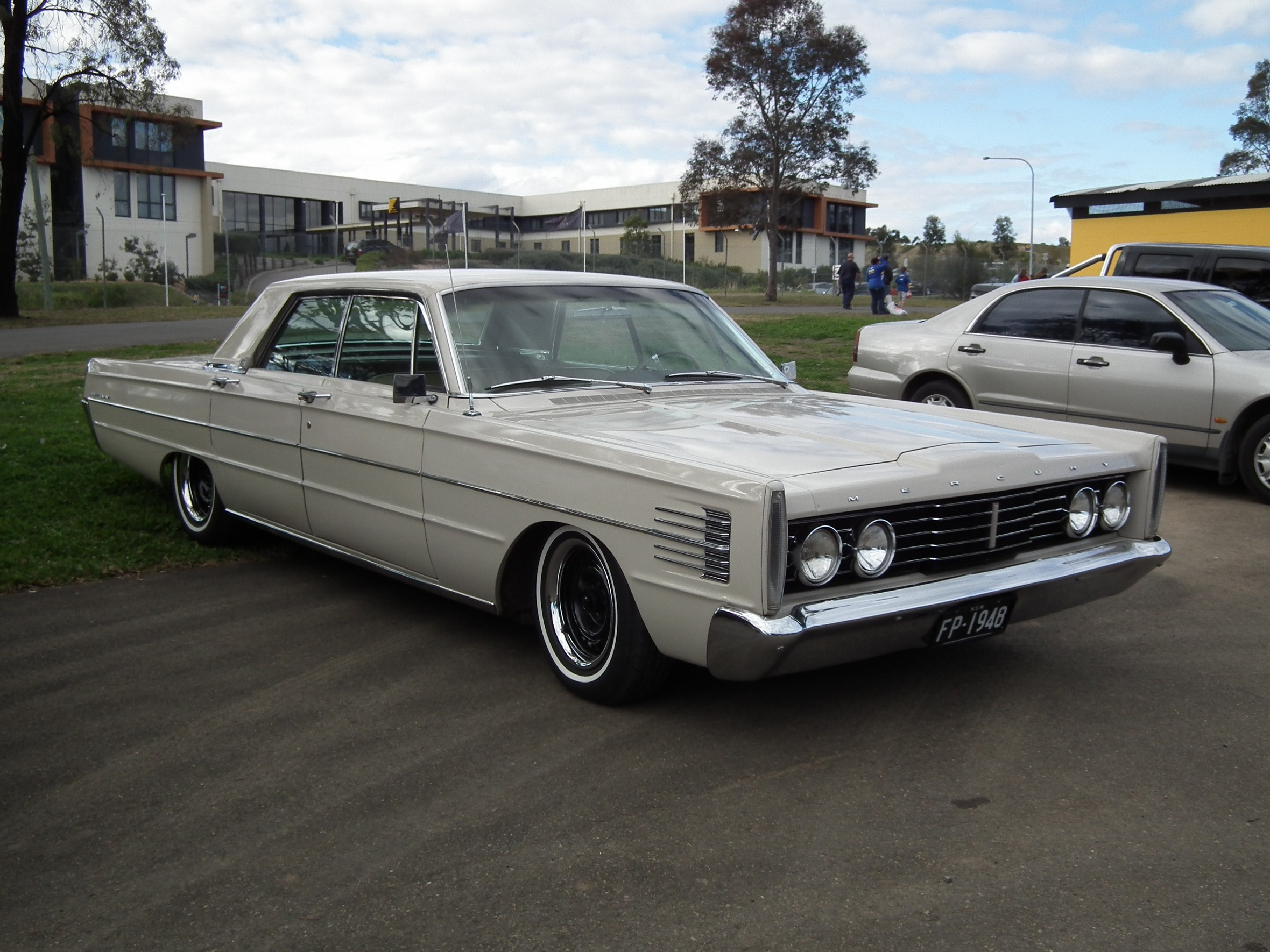
1965 Mercury Montclair Marauder 4-door hardtop

Marketing for the 1965 Mercurys shifted to emphasize luxury and a closer relationship with Ford's premium line of Lincolns. With this positioning, the Marauder became a trim option available on the Park Lane, Montclair, and Monterey series in two- or four-door hardtop body styles.

The Marauder versions were not promoted or mentioned in dealer sales brochures. The trim option featured a small emblem (with a flag) on the "C" pillar to distinguish them from other versions. Moreover, all full-size Mercury hardtop coupes featured the same "slant back" roofline as the full-sized Ford versions. This was a more sharply angled version of the original 1964 Marauder roofline. All four-door hardtops now had a new formal "limousine" styled notchback roofline shared with Ford's Galaxie hardtop sedans. Mercury continued to advertise the big-block FE-series V8s as "Marauder" engines.

For the 1966 model year, Mercury shifted further away from full-size performance vehicles. A repackaged S-55 model replaced the Marauder option. The move also consolidated the options available on three Mercury model lines into a more distinct nameplate.

== Second generation (1969–1970) ==
Second generation
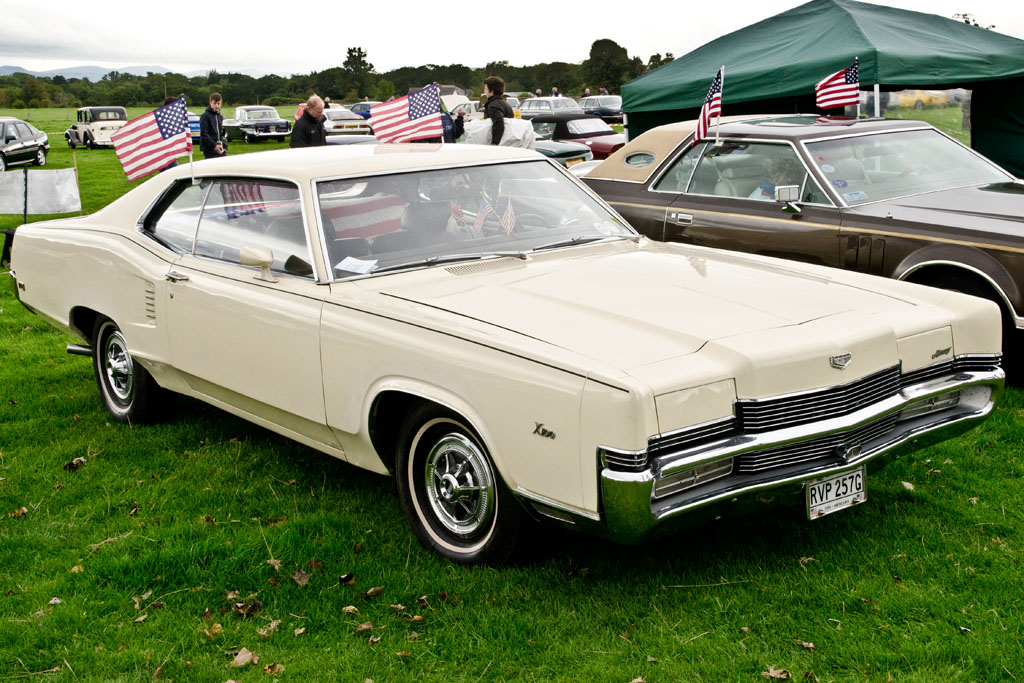
- 1969 Mercury Marauder X-100

Overview
- Model years: 1969–1970
- Assembly: Hazelwood, Missouri (St. Louis Assembly Plant); Pico Rivera, California (Los Angeles Assembly); Hapeville, Georgia (Atlanta Assembly)

Body and chassis
- Body style: 2-door hardtop
- Related: Mercury Marquis; Ford XL

Powertrain
- Engine: 390 cu in (6.4 L) FE V8; 429 cu in (7.0 L) 385 V8
- Transmission: 3-speed manual; 3-speed FMX/SelectShift automatic; 3-speed C6/SelectShift automatic

Dimensions
- Wheelbase: 121.0 in (3,073 mm)
- Length: 219.1 in (5,565 mm)
- Width: 79.6 in (2,022 mm)
- Height: 53.5 in (1,359 mm)
- Curb weight: 4,328 lb (1,963 kg)

For the 1969 model year, Mercury returned the Marauder nameplate to its product line. Positioned as a personal luxury car, the Marauder replaced the performance-oriented S-55 and sought to appeal to the interest generated by the Lincoln Continental Mark III introduced in 1968 and the Mercury Cougar while competing for buyers of the 1969 Ford Thunderbird.

Slotted below the Marquis in size, the Marauder model was derived from multiple Mercury and Ford vehicles. Sharing its roofline with the Ford XL and Ford Galaxie 500 SportsRoof, the Marauder shared its front sheet metal, interior trim, and concealed headlights with the Marquis. The Marauder shared its 121-inch wheelbase with all full-size Fords and Mercury's full-size station wagons. Like other 1960s vehicles with fastback profiles, its rear window was "tunneled", with large rear flying buttresses at the C-pillars. The rear quarter panels featured non-functional louvered side air intakes. The listed retail price was US$3,351 ($29,420 in 2025 dollars) and 9,031 were sold.

By the end of the 1960s, demand for high-performance full-size cars had largely disappeared. Mercury would sell about 15,000 units for 1969, and barely a third of that for 1970; compared to the Marauder, Mercury would sell nearly 173,000 Cougars at the same time. Within the Lincoln-Mercury Division, the far more expensive Continental Mark III outsold the Marauder more than two-to-one from 1969 to 1970.

=== Powertrain ===
Standard versions of the Marauder were equipped with the 390 cu in (6.4 L) Ford FE engine and a manual 3-speed transmission. The Marauder X-100 was only equipped with the 360 hp (268 kW; 365 PS) 429 cu in (7.0 L) engine with a 3-speed FMX automatic as an option. The only transmission available with the 429 was the 3-speed Ford C6 automatic.

=== Mercury Marauder X-100 ===
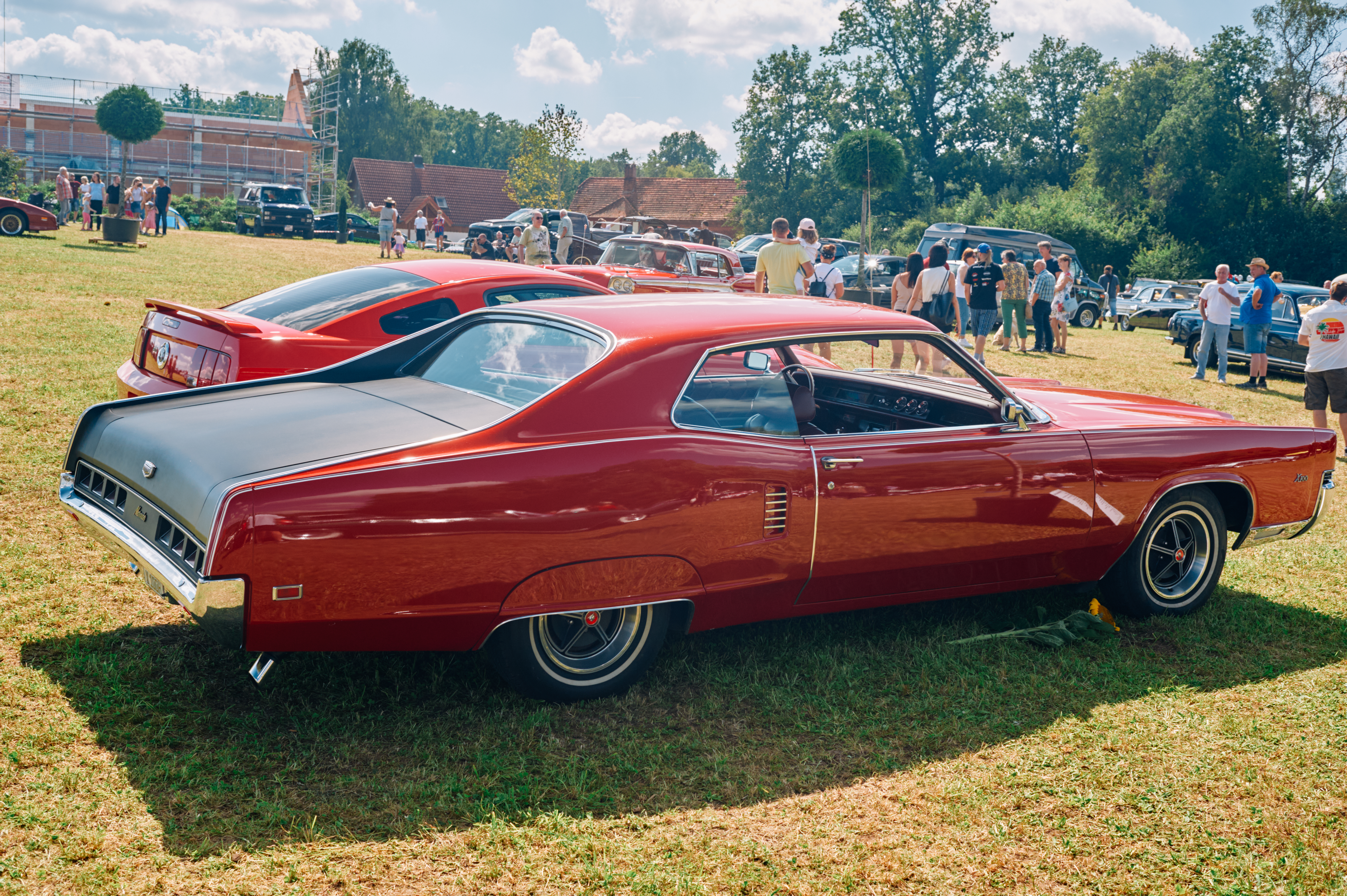
1969 Mercury Marauder X-100

To offer a higher-performance version of the Marauder, Mercury introduced the Marauder X-100. While nearly all features of the X-100 were cosmetic, the Marauder X-100 offered a choice of twin comfort lounge seats, bench seat, or bucket seats with a floor console housing a U-shaped automatic transmission shift handle. The X-100 also featured Kelsey-Hayes road wheels along with rear fender skirts, and was listed at US$4,074 ($35,768 in 2025 dollars) selling 9,031 examples.

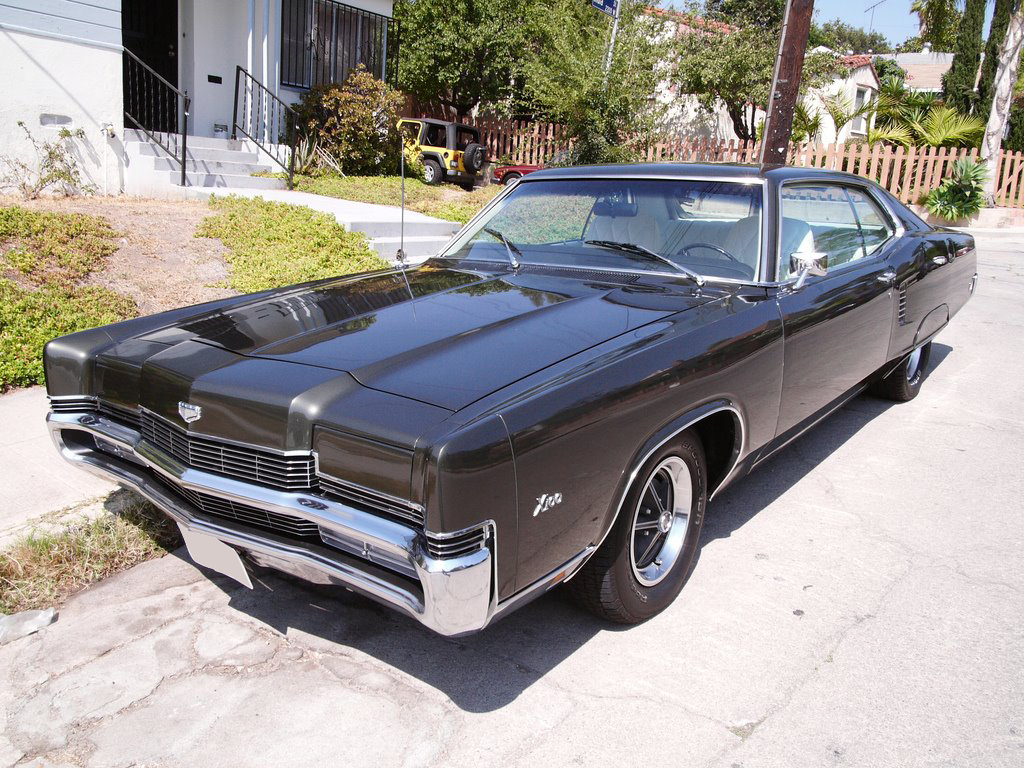
1969 Mercury Marauder X-100

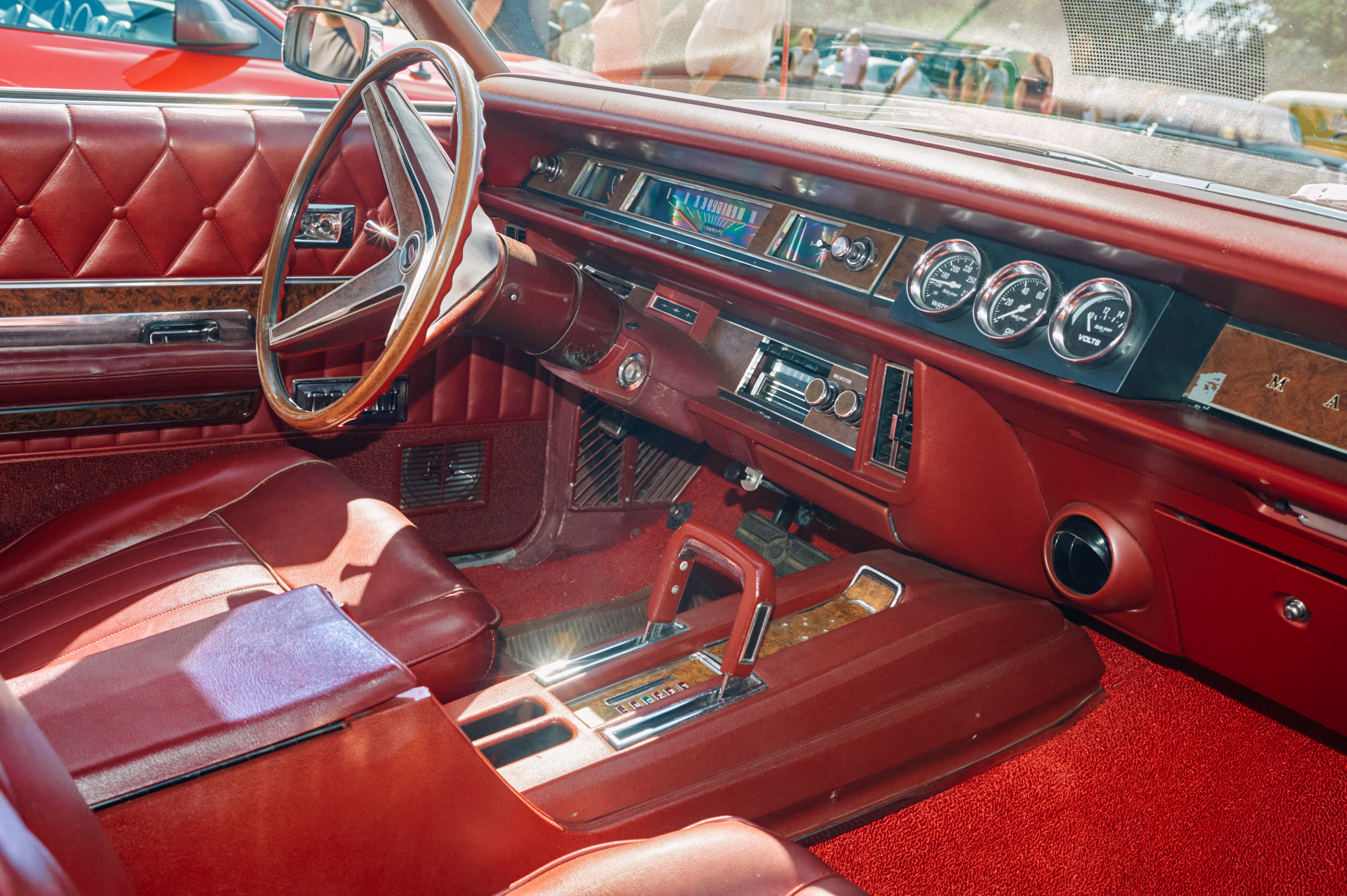
1969 Mercury Marauder X-100 interior

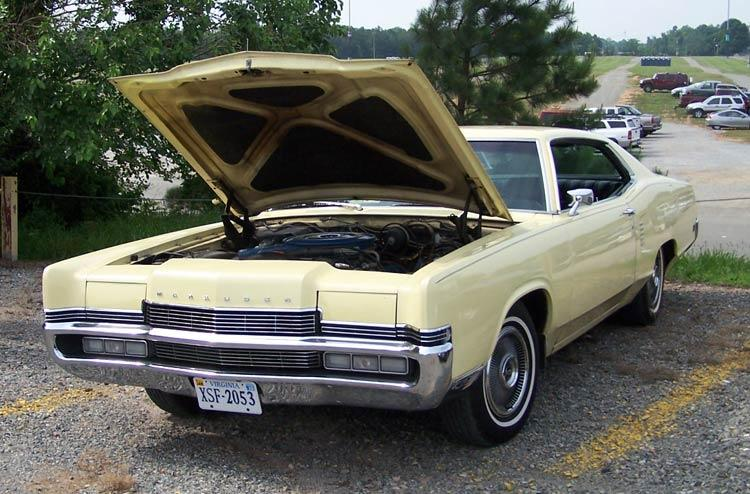
1970 Mercury Marauder

== Third generation (2003–2004) ==
Third generation
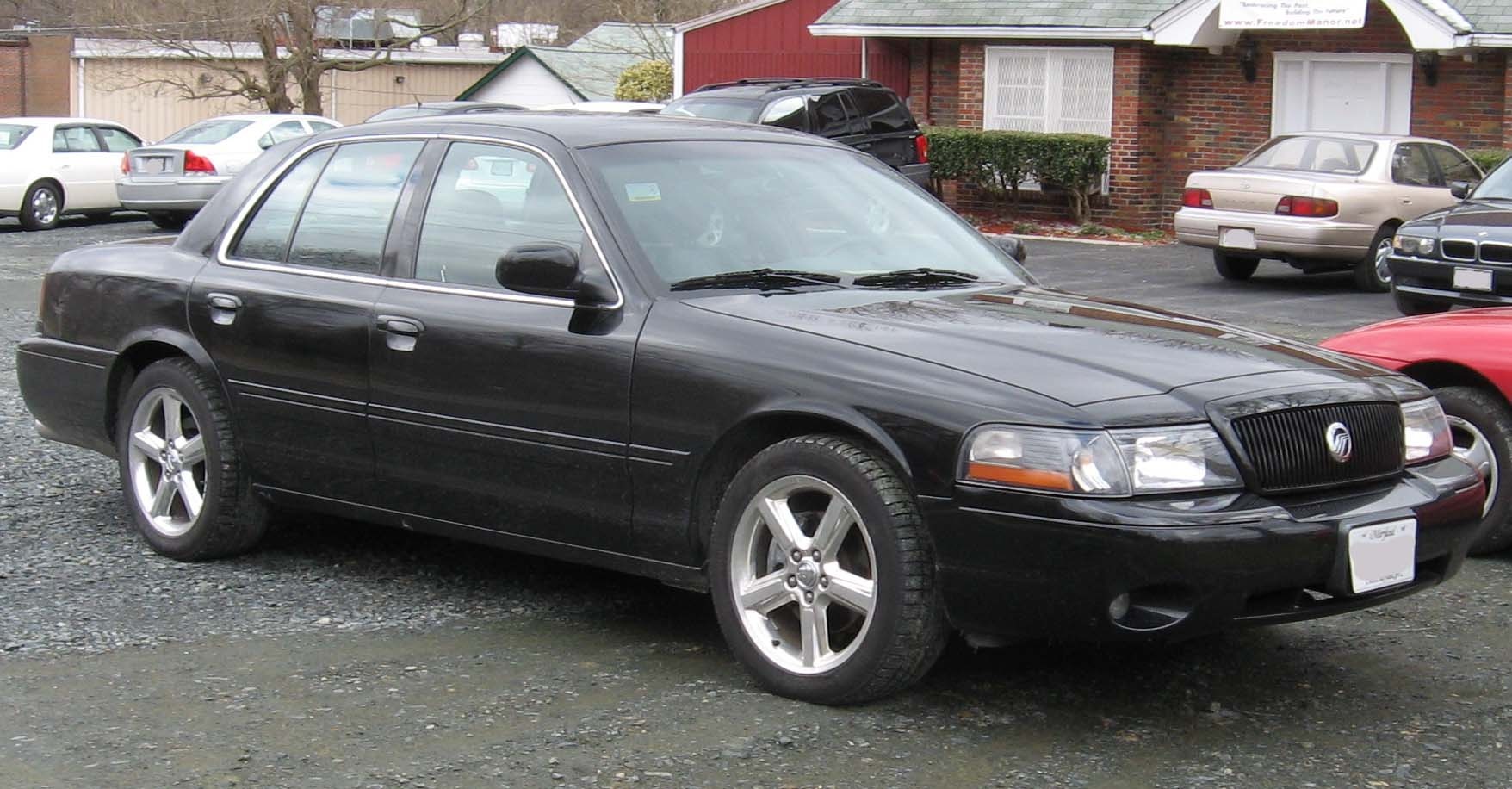
- 2003–2004 Mercury Marauder

Overview
- Production: May 2002 – June 25, 2004
- Model years: 2003–2004
- Assembly: Canada: St. Thomas, Ontario (St. Thomas Assembly Plant)

Body and chassis
- Body style: 4-door sedan
- Platform: Ford Panther platform
- Related: Mercury Grand Marquis; Ford Crown Victoria; Lincoln Town Car

Powertrain
- Engine: 302 hp 4.6 L Modular DOHC V8
- Transmission: 4-speed 4R70W automatic (2003); 4-speed 4R75W automatic (2004)

Dimensions
- Wheelbase: 114.7 in (2,913 mm)
- Length: 212.0 in (5,385 mm)
- Width: 78.2 in (1,986 mm)
- Height: 56.8 in (1,443 mm)

For the 2003 model year, Mercury revived the Marauder nameplate after a 33-year hiatus. Similar in concept to its 1960s namesake, the new Marauder offered upgraded chassis, suspension, and powertrain components over the standard Grand Marquis. For the first time since 1960, Mercury offered a full-size sedan with no Ford counterpart, developing it to appeal to the niche last filled by the 1994 through 1996 Chevrolet Impala SS. As the Marauder was canceled, Chrysler reintroduced the 2005 Chrysler 300 as a rear-drive luxury sedan with the all-new Hemi V8.

The introduction of the Marauder launched a near-complete replenishment of the Mercury model line. Though the Grand Marquis sedan and Mountaineer SUV would remain in production, from 2004 to 2006, Mercury introduced the Monterey minivan (2004) and Mariner SUV (2005); the Sable was replaced by the Montego and Milan sedans (2005 and 2006).

After the end of the 2004 model year, the Marauder was discontinued with no direct Mercury or Ford replacement. Initially predicted for sales of 18,000 vehicles per year, the revived Marauder sold slowly, with only 11,052 sold over its two-year production (compared to nearly 180,000 Grand Marquis sold in the same time). In a key marketing success, the Marauder attracted younger buyers into Lincoln-Mercury showrooms; the average age of its buyer (51) was 18 years younger than that of the Grand Marquis (69).

=== Development ===
At the 2002 Chicago Auto Show, Ford introduced the Mercury Marauder as a concept car. Serving as a preview of the production vehicle, the 2002 concept car was a five-passenger, two-door convertible. Starting life as a 1999 Ford Crown Victoria LX, the body was reconfigured and the 215 hp (160 kW; 218 PS) 4.6 L V8 replaced by a 335 hp (250 kW; 340 PS) supercharged 4.6 L SOHC V8.

The first full-sized convertible produced by Ford since the 1972 Ford LTD convertible and the first full-sized two-door sedan (by Ford) since 1987, the Marauder convertible was strictly intended as a concept car. At the time of its development, production of the 2-door convertible was under consideration, related to consumer demand.

=== Chassis ===
The 2003–2004 Marauder utilized the Panther platform, adopting the chassis upgrades introduced as part of its 2003 update (including the introduction of rack-and-pinion steering). The Marauder also used heavier-duty brake and suspension components from the Ford Crown Victoria Police Interceptor.

For production Marauders, Mercury used a 302 hp (225 kW; 306 PS) 4.6 L DOHC V8; an evolution of the Lincoln Mark VIII engine, the V8 was shared with the Mustang Mach 1 and Lincoln Aviator. For 2003, the engine used a 4-speed 4R70W automatic, switching to a 4R75W automatic for 2004.

The Marauder shared its limited-slip differential (and 3.55:1 rear-axle ratio) with the Crown Victoria Police Interceptor, along with its aluminum driveshaft.

=== Body ===
In line with the B-body Chevrolet Impala SS, the 2003 Marauder was given a monochromatic appearance, with most cars sold in black. In contrast to the Grand Marquis, the only chrome on the Marauder is its window trim, wheels, and Mercury emblems on the grille and trunk lid.

On the exterior, the Marauder shares most of its trim with the Grand Marquis; much of the rear and side trim is shared with the Crown Victoria LX Sport. Both bumpers are unique to the Marauder; the rear features the model name embossed on the bumper and is modified further to accommodate the larger Megs chrome tailpipe tips. The front bumper was redesigned with a central air intake added to improve engine ventilation; round Cibié fog lamps were added below the headlights. The headlight and corner light lenses (from the Grand Marquis) had their non-reflective surfaces blacked out, and the grille was painted black with a body-color surround. The taillight and reverse light lenses (from the Crown Victoria LX Sport) were dark-tinted to the minimum of DOT standards. Unique to the Marauder, the 18-inch five-spoke wheels have center caps with a revival of a 1960s Mercury emblem (a silhouette of the Roman god Mercury).

The interior of the Marauder resembled the configuration of the 2002 concept convertible, adopting a five-seat layout with a center console-mounted transmission shifter (shared with the Crown Victoria LX Sport and Grand Marquis LSE). Leather seating was standard, with (simulated) satin aluminum trim replacing wood trim. Unique to the Marauder, the instrument panel was redesigned with aluminum-finish gauges and a 140-mph speedometer. Unique among Panther platform vehicles (at the time), the Marauder was fitted with a tachometer, requiring the relocation of the voltmeter and oil pressure gauges (forward of the shifter).

=== 2003-1/2 MY de-contenting ===
Midway through the 2003 model year, Ford de-contented the Mercury Marauder along with the rest of the Panther platform line. 2003 model year Marauders built after December 2002 lost numerous standard features, including remote locking fuel doors, an auto parking brake pedal release, an engine compartment lamp, an in-dash clock, foam headliner sound deadening inserts, and front bottom seat pouches. Ford estimated that de-contenting the entire Panther platform lineup would save US$4,000,000 in production costs annually.

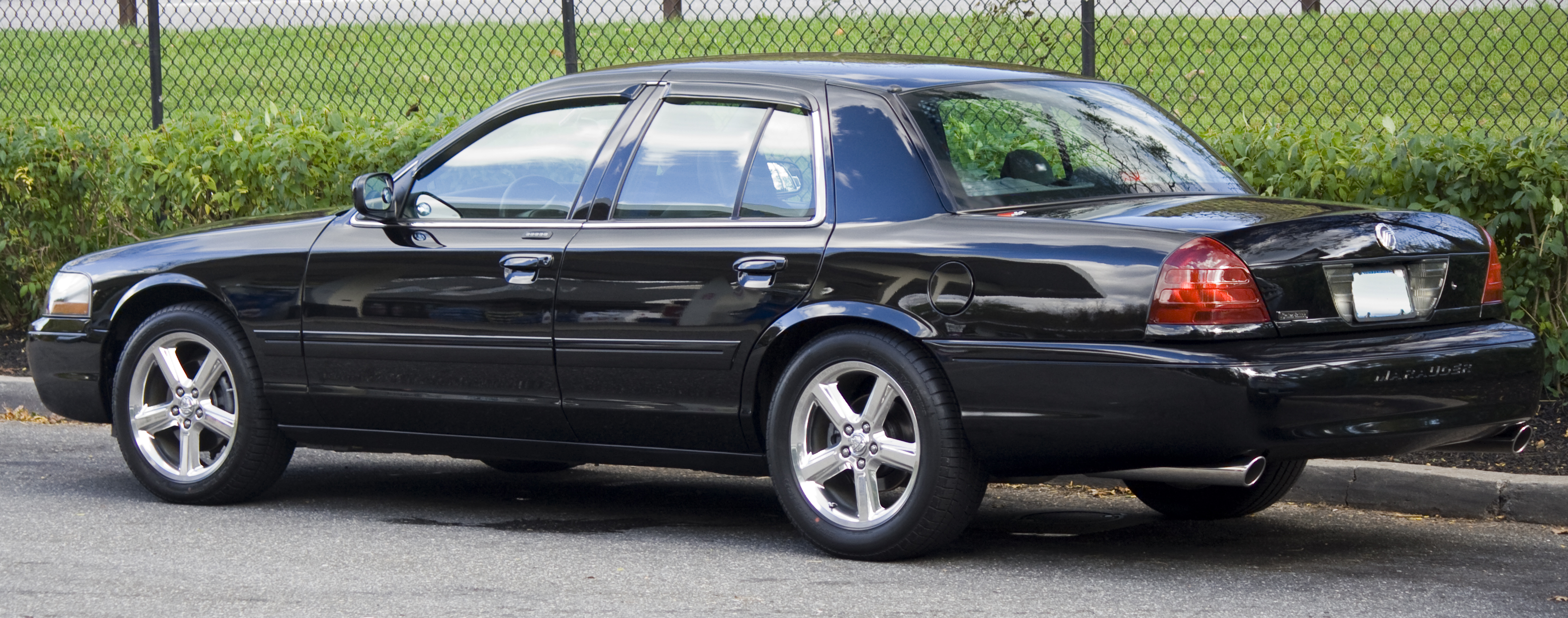
Mercury Marauder

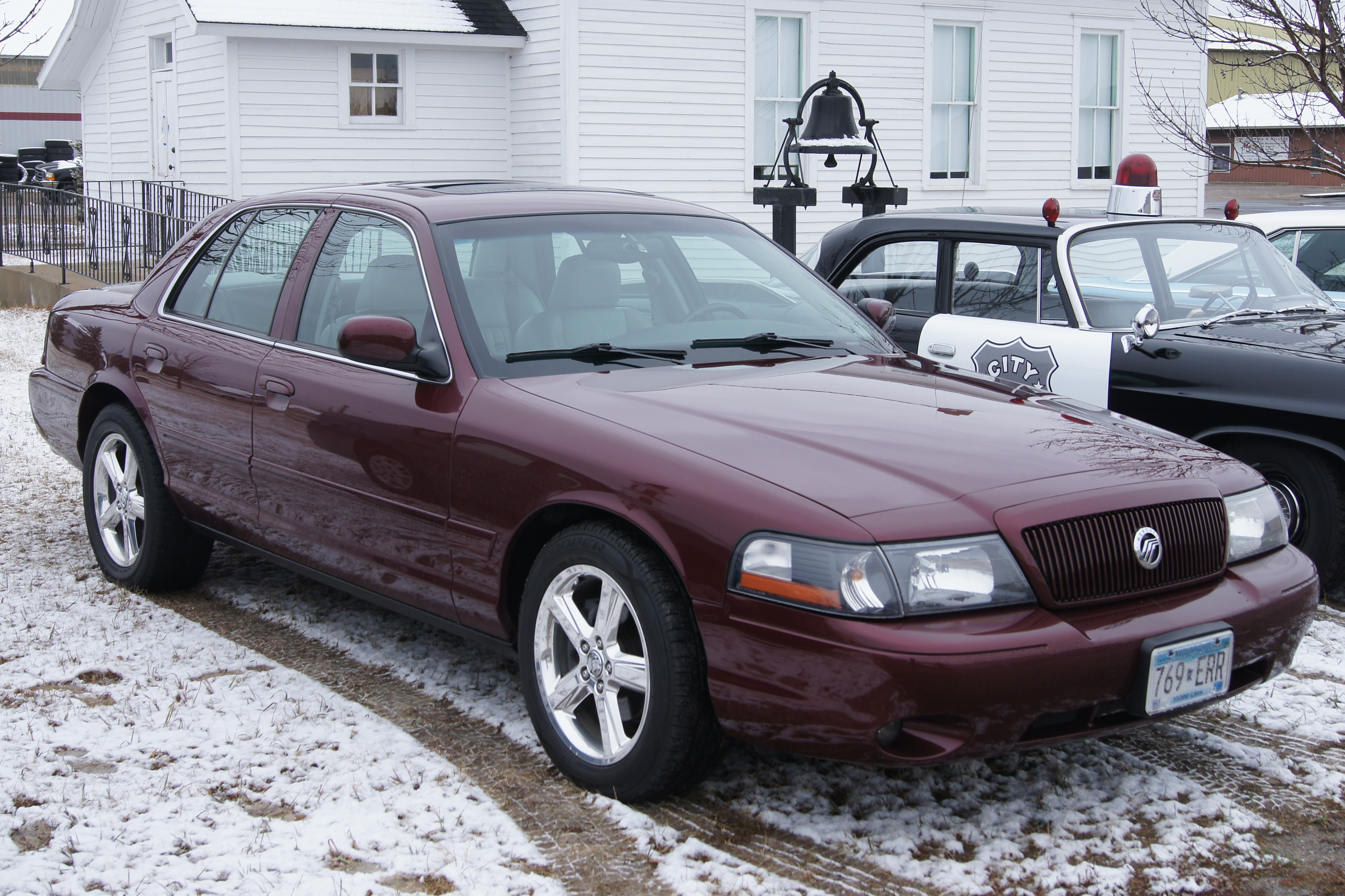
Mercury Marauder (Dark Toreador Red)

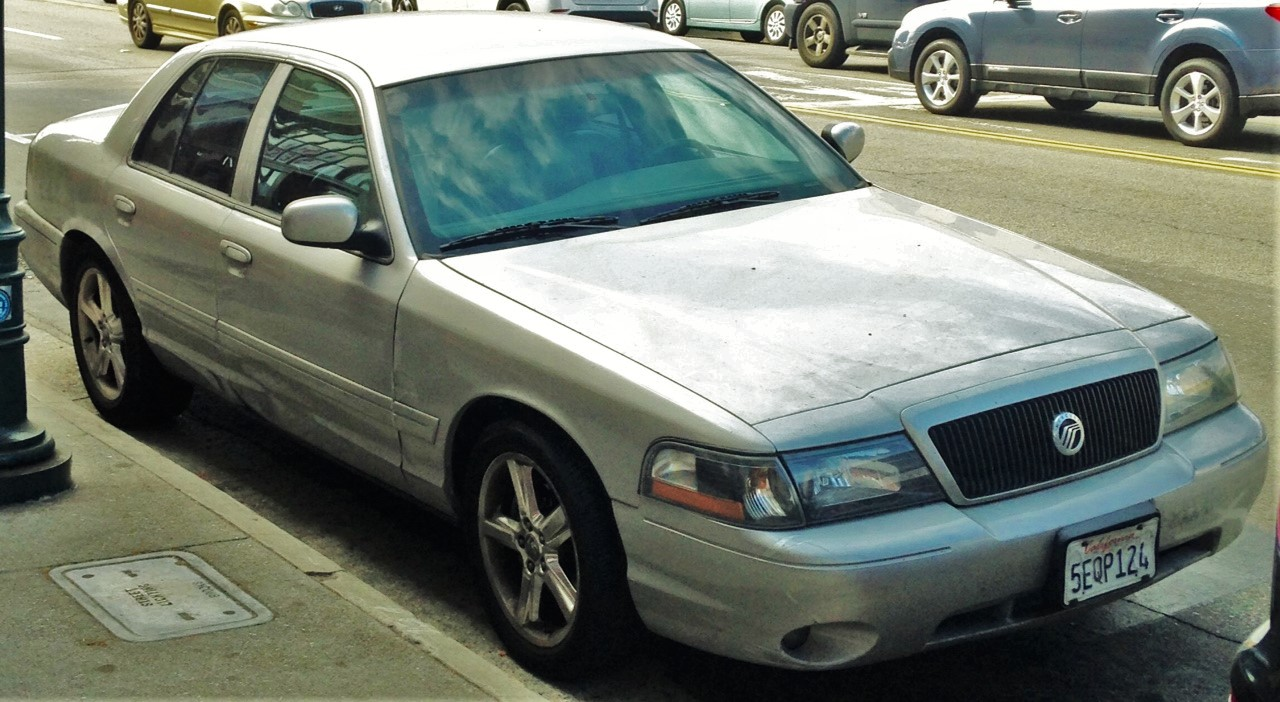
Mercury Marauder (Silver Birch)

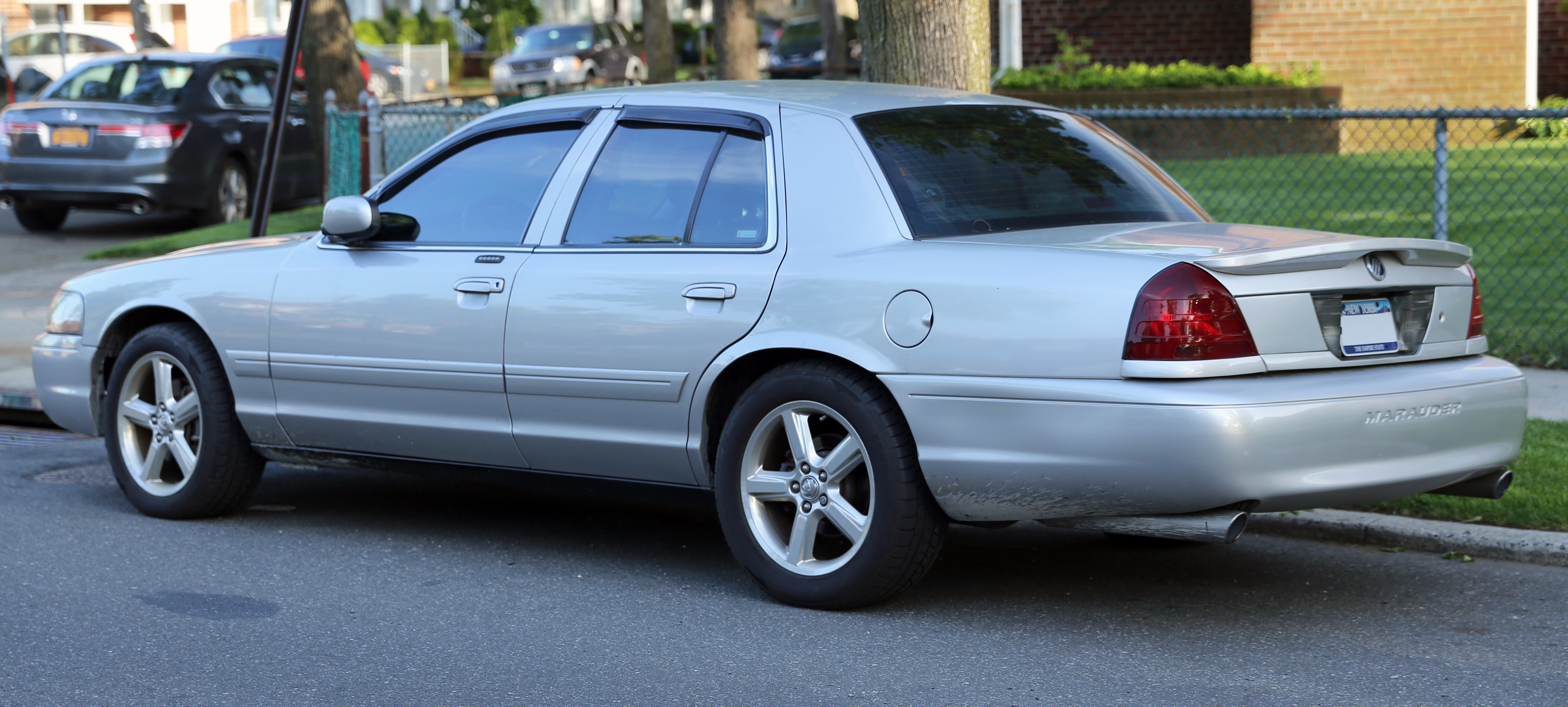
2004 Mercury Marauder (Silver Birch) with optional trunk spoiler

=== Sales ===
2003–2004 Mercury Marauder sales
Model year	Sales (by color)				
Model year	Black	Silver Birch	Dark Pearl Blue	Dark Toreador Red	Total yearly sales
2003	7,093	417	328	N/A	7,838
2004	1,237	997	N/A	980	3,214
Total sales					11,052

== See also ==
- Sleeper (car)
