= St. Thomas Assembly =

Automobile plant

Coordinates: 42.830314°N 81.25999°W

St. Thomas Assembly Plant
- Former site of the St. Thomas Assembly manufacturing plant
- Built: 1967
- Location: 11920-11968 Sunset Drive Southwold, Ontario; Southwold, Ontario
- Industry: Automotive
- Products: Ford Panther platform: Ford Crown Victoria; Lincoln Town Car; Mercury Grand Marquis
- Employees: 1,590
- Area: 2,600,000 sq ft (240,000 m^{2})
- Defunct: 2011

St. Thomas Assembly was an automobile plant located in the township of Southwold, Ontario, Canada, close to the village of Talbotville and the nearby city of St. Thomas. The 2,600,000 sq ft (240,000 m^{2}) facility, situated on a 635 acres (2.57 km^{2}) site, opened in 1967, building the Ford Falcon. Flexible fuel vehicles (FFV) capable of operating on ethanol fuel were manufactured there during the later years of the assembly plant. Ford's plans for sustainability and reduction of fossil fuel consumption relied on the St. Thomas Plant and its Lincoln Town Car vehicles for years. It also produced the final Mercury vehicle, a Mercury Grand Marquis, after Ford decided to discontinue the Mercury brand after the 2011 model year.

Following the closure of the Wixom Assembly Plant in Michigan, production of the Lincoln Town Car (which was the only Ford Panther platform vehicle to be produced at the Plant) moved to St. Thomas Assembly starting with the 2007 model year. This allowed the Ford Motor Company to consolidate production of all three Ford Panther platform vehicles (the Ford Crown Victoria, the Lincoln Town Car, and the Mercury Grand Marquis) to a single assembly plant.

The plant closed on September 15, 2011. The last Crown Victoria built by the remaining 300 employees was sent to Saudi Arabia.

Decommissioning did not start until mid-2015. The plant had been largely demolished by the end of 2016, with only the wastewater treatment facility left standing as of February 2017. An initial proposal to have the site developed as a solar farm fell through when regulatory approval was not obtained, but decommissioning was completed in 2019, with the property becoming available for sale. In 2021, Amazon purchased the site to build a fulfillment center.

== Products ==
In total, over eight million vehicles were produced by St. Thomas Assembly from 1967 to 2011. Alongside the vehicles of the Ford Panther platform, St. Thomas also produced the Ford Falcon, Ford Maverick (Mercury Comet), Ford Pinto (Mercury Bobcat), Ford Fairmont (Mercury Zephyr), and Ford Escort EXP (Mercury LN7).

=== Ford ===
Ford Falcon
Ford Maverick
Ford Pinto
Ford Fairmont
Ford EXP
Ford LTD Crown Victoria
Ford Crown Victoria
│
1965
│
1970
│
1975
│
1980
│
1985
│
1990
│
1995
│
2000
│
2005
│
2010
│
2015

=== Mercury ===
Mercury Bobcat
Mercury Zephyr
LN7
Mercury Grand Marquis
Mercury Marauder
│
1965
│
1970
│
1975
│
1980
│
1985
│
1990
│
1995
│
2000
│
2005
│
2010
│
2015

=== Lincoln ===
Town Car
│
1965
│
1970
│
1975
│
1980
│
1985
│
1990
│
1995
│
2000
│
2005
│
2010
│
2015
