= Ford Panther platform =

1979–2012 motor vehicle platform from Ford Motor Company

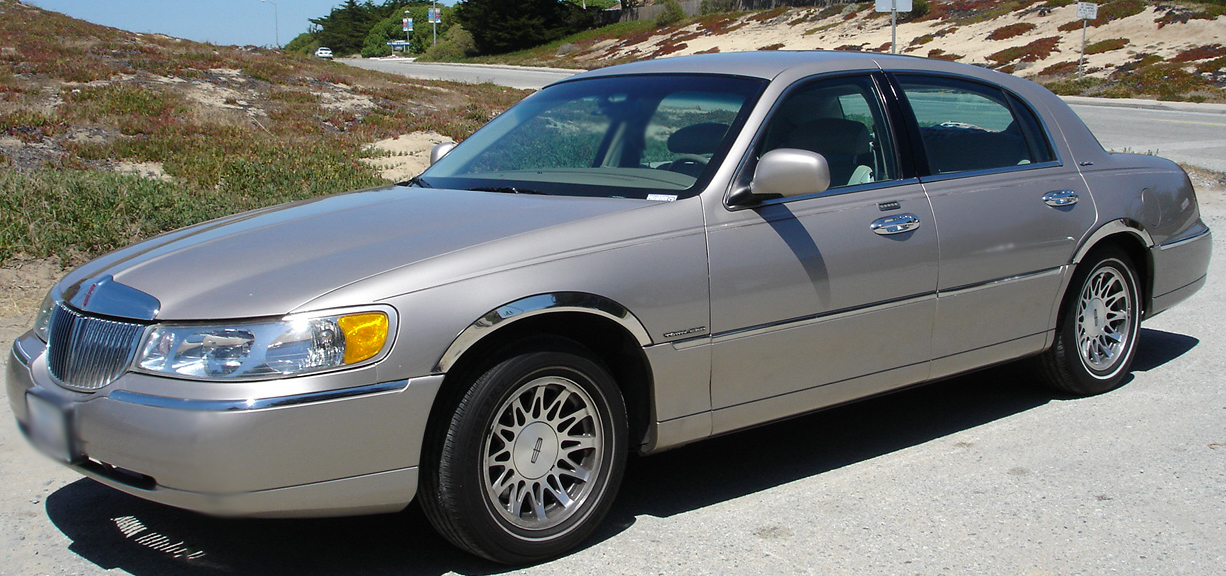
- 2000 Lincoln Town Car Signature Series

Overview
- Manufacturer: Ford Motor Company
- Production: 1978–2011
- Assembly: Canada: Talbotville, Ontario (St. Thomas Assembly); United States: Hazelwood, Missouri (St. Louis Assembly Plant); Wixom, Michigan (Wixom Assembly)

Body and chassis
- Class: Full-size car Full-size luxury car Personal luxury car Limousine
- Layout: FR layout, body-on-frame
- Body styles: 2-door sedan (1979–1987); 4-door sedan (1979–2012); 5-door station wagon (1979–1991)
- Vehicles: Ford models: Ford LTD; Ford LTD Crown Victoria; Ford Country Squire; Ford Crown Victoria; Ford Crown Victoria Police Interceptor; Mercury models: Mercury Marquis; Mercury Colony Park; Mercury Grand Marquis; Mercury Marauder; Lincoln models: Lincoln Continental; Lincoln Town Car; Continental models: Continental Mark VI

Powertrain
- Engines: Ford 4.2L Small Block V8 (1981–1982); Ford 5.0L Small Block V8 (1979–1991); Ford 351/5.8L Windsor V8 (1979–1991); Ford 351M/5.8L 335 Series V8 (1979–1981; Mercury Marquis and Canada only); Ford 4.6L Modular V8 (1991–2012)

Dimensions
- Wheelbase: 114.3–123.7 in (2,900–3,140 mm)

Chronology
- Predecessor: 1969 Ford
- Successor: Ford D3 platform

The Ford Panther platform was an automobile platform that was used by Ford Motor Company from the 1979 to 2012 model years. Following the downsizing of the General Motors B-bodies and C-bodies by two years, the Panther platform marked the end of production of full-sized American sedans. Originally slated for discontinuation during the early 1980s, the Panther architecture was used for 33 model years, making it one of the longest-produced platforms in North American automotive history.

Developed as a successor to the 1969 Ford chassis, the rear-wheel-drive, body-on-frame Panther platform was used by the Ford and Lincoln-Mercury brands. While produced exclusively as four-door sedans from 1992 to 2012, prior to its first update, the chassis underpinned two-door sedans and five-door station wagons. Throughout its entire production life, all Panther-platform vehicles were equipped with a V8 engine; the Modular V8 engine introduced in 1991 was the first overhead-cam V8 engine used in a mass-produced American vehicle.

Initially developed in response to the implementation of CAFE by the U.S. federal government, the Panther platform outlived its closest rival (the 1977–1996 GM B platform) by 15 years, with the 2012 Ford Crown Victoria becoming the final mass-produced passenger car designed with a separate frame. While body-on-frame construction is retained by pickup trucks and larger SUVs, unibody construction (or variants thereof) sees nearly universal use in passenger cars.

From 1978 to 1985, Ford and Mercury versions of the Panther platform were assembled in Hazelwood, Missouri (St. Louis Assembly). For the 1986 model year, production shifted to Talbotville, Ontario, Canada (St. Thomas Assembly). Lincoln versions were sourced from Wixom, Michigan (Wixom Assembly), until its 2007 closure; from 2008 to 2011, the Lincoln Town Car was assembled by St. Thomas Assembly. After a short production run of 2012 vehicles for export, St. Thomas Assembly produced the final Ford Crown Victoria on 15 September 2011, the final vehicle produced by the facility and the final vehicle of the Panther platform.

== Design overview ==
The Panther platform utilized the body-on-frame construction with live rear-axle suspension. While commonplace during its late-1970s introduction, it is a design found almost exclusively in large SUVs and pickup trucks today. The durability resulting from the body-on-frame construction (which allows easier repair after minor collisions) and their relatively simple design make the Panther cars appealing as fleet vehicles, including police cars and taxicabs. The Lincoln Town Car appealed largely to livery services, and was the most commonly used limousine in North America, as it could easily be "stretched" by lengthening the frame without compromising chassis strength.

Although introduced in 1978, the Panther platform underwent major changes along the way. Across its design life, it was produced in three distinct generations:

- First generation (1979–1991): This generation was the only one to be produced in three body styles: four-door sedan, two-door coupe, and five-door station wagon. This was the only generation to use the Windsor V8 engine.
- Second generation (1990–2002): Extensive redesigns of exterior and interior; introduction of Modular V8 engine; and four-door sedan was only body style.
- Third generation (2003–2012): Frame and suspension redesigns and upgrades to improve handling. 2011 was the last model year for the North American market and for Lincoln-Mercury models. A limited number of 2012 Crown Victorias were built for the overseas market.

=== First generation (1978–1991) ===
For 1979, Ford introduced the Panther platform, downsizing the Ford LTD and Mercury Marquis model ranges. Along with an extensive reduction in exterior footprint and weight, the Panther platform saw several other changes. For the first time, the LTD and Marquis shared a common wheelbase; with the exception of grilles and taillights, the two model lines shared nearly identical bodywork. As before, two-door, four-door, and station wagon bodies were offered.

For 1980, federal fuel-economy regulations forced the Lincoln Continental to adopt the Panther platform. While built on its own wheelbase and using its own bodywork, the Continental, Town Car, and Continental Mark VI used the same powertrain as the LTD and Marquis.

Following the introduction of the Panther platform, Ford underwent an extensive revision of both its full-size and mid-size model ranges in the early 1980s. For 1981, Lincoln made the Town Car and four-door Continental Mark VI its full-size model line to reduce its model overlap, with the Continental later becoming a mid-size sedan (based on the Fox platform); the two-door version of the Mark VI was replaced in 1984 by the Mark VII coupe. For 1983, the Ford LTD and Mercury Marquis became mid-size sedans, replacing the Ford Granada and Mercury Cougar while the LTD Crown Victoria and Mercury Grand Marquis became distinct model lines, in an effort to move full-size model ranges upward in prestige.

The first generation of the Panther platform is the sole generation produced in multiple body styles. 1981 was the sole year for the Town Car coupe with the two-door version of the Mark VI ending production after 1983. After 1987, two-door Ford and Mercury sedans were discontinued due to low demand. After 1991, the Ford LTD Country Squire and Mercury Colony Park station wagons were discontinued.

Changes

Outside of the shift of nameplates in the early 1980s, few fundamental changes were made to first-generation Panther-platform vehicles from 1979 to 1991. For 1980, Lincoln introduced the AOD 4-speed overdrive automatic transmission and fuel injection for the 5.0L V8, becoming available for Ford and Mercury in 1981 (Canadian Lincolns got fuel injection only in 1984).

For 1988, the LTD Crown Victoria and Grand Marquis underwent a minor revision to improve exterior aerodynamics. For 1990, the Panther platform received its first addition of SRS airbags. The Town Car (shifting to the second generation) was designed with dual airbags; the LTD Crown Victoria, Grand Marquis, and station wagons were fitted with driver-side airbags.

The first-generation Panther was also:

- The last American car with functional vent windows (option on 1989 Ford/Mercury)
- The last American-brand car available with a carbureted engine (351 cubic-inch V8; option on Grand Marquis, Crown Victoria wagon/police car through 1991)

=== Second generation (1990–2002) ===
The American automotive landscape had changed significantly throughout the 1980s, although Ford had left the Panther platform essentially unchanged. A combination of changing consumer tastes as well as increasingly more stringent fuel economy standards forced Ford to make significant changes to the Panther cars in order to keep them in production. Bucking industry trends of the time, Ford chose not to downsize it any further or to replace it entirely with a front-wheel-drive platform, opting instead for more aerodynamic bodystyling (which had been popularized by the smaller Taurus) and an all-new powertrain. As a result of changing market trends towards minivans and sport utility vehicles, one casualty of the redesign was the Country Squire and Colony Park station wagons; at the time, their de facto replacement was the Ford Aerostar.

In October 1989, Lincoln introduced the second-generation Town Car. In early 1991, the Crown Victoria (the LTD prefix disappeared) and Grand Marquis received total redesigns of their bodies for 1992. The Ford was restyled to have more of a family resemblance to the Ford Taurus, while the Mercury was styled as a more contemporary version of its predecessor (a formal family sedan).

4.6-liter "Modular" V8

In 1991, the 4.6L SOHC Modular V8 debuted under the hood of the Lincoln Town Car. It was the replacement for both the 302 and 351 cubic-inch Windsor V8 engines; in 1992, it became available in the Crown Victoria and Grand Marquis. Although the torque peak for the Modular V8 was 1,200 rpm higher than for the 302 V8, the 4.6L was available with up to 60 more horsepower (with optional dual exhaust).

1998 upgrades

In 1997, Ford significantly upgraded the exterior designs of all three Panther platform cars. The Town Car received the most extensive changes with its entire body being restyled. To increase parts commonality between the two, the Crown Victoria was redesigned to share the rear roofline (and much of the exterior sheetmetal) with the Grand Marquis, which saw minor cosmetic changes itself. On the underpinning chassis, a Watt's linkage replaced the triangulated rear control arm setup used on the live rear axle suspension in an effort to improve handling.

=== Third generation (2003–2011) ===
For 2003, Ford Chassis Engineer Trever Skilnick completely redesigned the frame of the Panther platform using a hydroformed steel frame and a bolt-in cast aluminum stressed member that held the powertrain. The front and rear suspension were also completely overhauled in an effort to improve handling; rack-and-pinion steering replaced the recirculating-ball design. While the sheetmetal of the Crown Victoria carried over, the Grand Marquis and Town Car both received updates to the exterior and interior in an effort to bring them in line with the rest of their respective product lineups. The "Cast Aluminum #2" frame crossmember won Casting of The Year for Tier 1 supplier CMI (Hayes Lemmerz), and the new chassis was reviewed favorably by journalist Dan Neil of The Wall Street Journal.

For 2003, Mercury introduced the Marauder, a high-performance variant of the Grand Marquis. Designed in a similar fashion as the 1994–1996 Chevrolet Impala SS (with black also being its most commonly available paint color), it featured the engine of the Ford Mustang Mach 1. The Marauder sold poorly; it was dropped after 2004 after just over 11,000 were built.

== Models ==
In total, twelve vehicle nameplates were produced under the Panther platform, with the Ford LTD Crown Victoria, Ford Crown Victoria, Ford Crown Victoria Police Interceptor, Lincoln Town Car, and Continental Mark VI produced exclusively on the architecture.

Model Name	Model Years	Body Styles	Notes
Ford LTD; Ford LTD Crown Victoria	LTD: 1979–1982; LTD Crown Victoria: 1983–1991	2-door sedan 4-door sedan 5-door station wagon	LTD; Base-trim version sold as Ford Custom 500 in Canada from 1979–1981 (final appearance of nameplate).; LTD Landau replaced by LTD Crown Victoria trim in 1980.; LTD Crown Victoria; Two-door sedan discontinued after 1987.
Ford Crown Victoria	1992–2012	4-door sedan	Dropped LTD prefix as part of 1992 redesign.; Only Panther variant produced as a 2012 model; all were GCC export models.
Ford Crown Victoria Police Interceptor/P71	1993–2011 (see notes)	4-door sedan	Prior to 1993, Panther-based Ford police cars used the same model codes as fleet/taxi models.; From 2010–2011, P7B replaced P71 as the Police Interceptor VIN code.; Equipped with a heavier-duty suspension and brakes than the "civilian" model of the Crown Victoria; all police cars were equipped with dual exhaust engines.
Ford LTD Country Squire; Mercury Colony Park	1979–1991	5-door station wagon	LTD Country Squire; Last Ford LTD station wagon; only generation of the Panther platform to be built as one.; Most station wagons were woodgrain Country Squire models; non-woodgrain models were largely intended for fleet sales.; Sold with both fuel-injected 5.0L and carbureted 5.8L V8 engines after 1986.; Colony Park; Only generation of the Panther-platform Grand Marquis sold as a station wagon; the final full-size Mercury station wagon.; Sold as part of the Grand Marquis model range; the non-woodgrain Grand Marquis wagon was discontinued after 1983.; Sold with both fuel-injected 5.0L and carbureted 5.8L V8 engines after 1986.
Mercury Marquis	1979–1982	2-door sedan 4-door sedan 5-door station wagon	Base-trim version sold as Mercury Marquis Meteor in Canada from 1979–1981 (final appearance of Meteor nameplate).; Grand Marquis sold as highest-trim model.
Mercury Grand Marquis	1983–2011	2-door sedan 4-door sedan 5-door station wagon	Grand Marquis station wagon sold only as a 1983 model; subsequent station wagons are all woodgrained Colony Park versions.; Two-door sedan discontinued after 1987 model year.
Mercury Marauder	2003–2004	4-door sedan	High-performance variant of the Grand Marquis.; Monochromatic trim styled similar to 1994–1996 Chevrolet Impala SS.; Only 11,052 sold; it is the second-rarest Panther variant.
Continental Mark VI	1980–1983	2-door sedan 4-door sedan	Mark VI four-door was based upon Continental/Town Car, with unique front and rear bodywork.; Using the shorter wheelbase of the LTD/Marquis sedan, the Mark VI two-door shared its front and rear body panels with the four-door, but used its own roofline and doors.; The Mark VI is the last Lincoln to use concealed headlights and (factory-standard) oval opera windows.
Lincoln Continental; Lincoln Town Car	Continental: 1980; Town Car: 1981–2011	2-door sedan (see notes); 4-door sedan	Continental; Sold only for 1980, as full-size Continental range was consolidated into Mark VI and Town Car nameplates for 1981.; Sold with both fuel-injected 5.0L and carbureted 5.8L V8 engines.; Town Car; Town Car replaced Continental as Lincoln full-size range for 1981; the Continental prefix was dropped.; Town Car two-door only produced for 1981; it is the rarest and shortest-produced Panther variant (4,935 produced).; Town Car is the only four-door Panther to be produced in a long-wheelbase variant in North America besides the Crown Victoria P70 (2000–2011 Town Car L).

== Variants ==
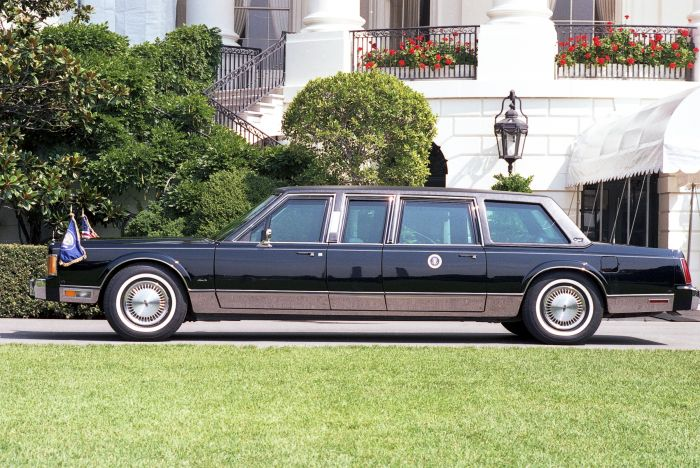
A 1989 Lincoln Town Car modified into a Presidential State Car for George H. W. Bush.

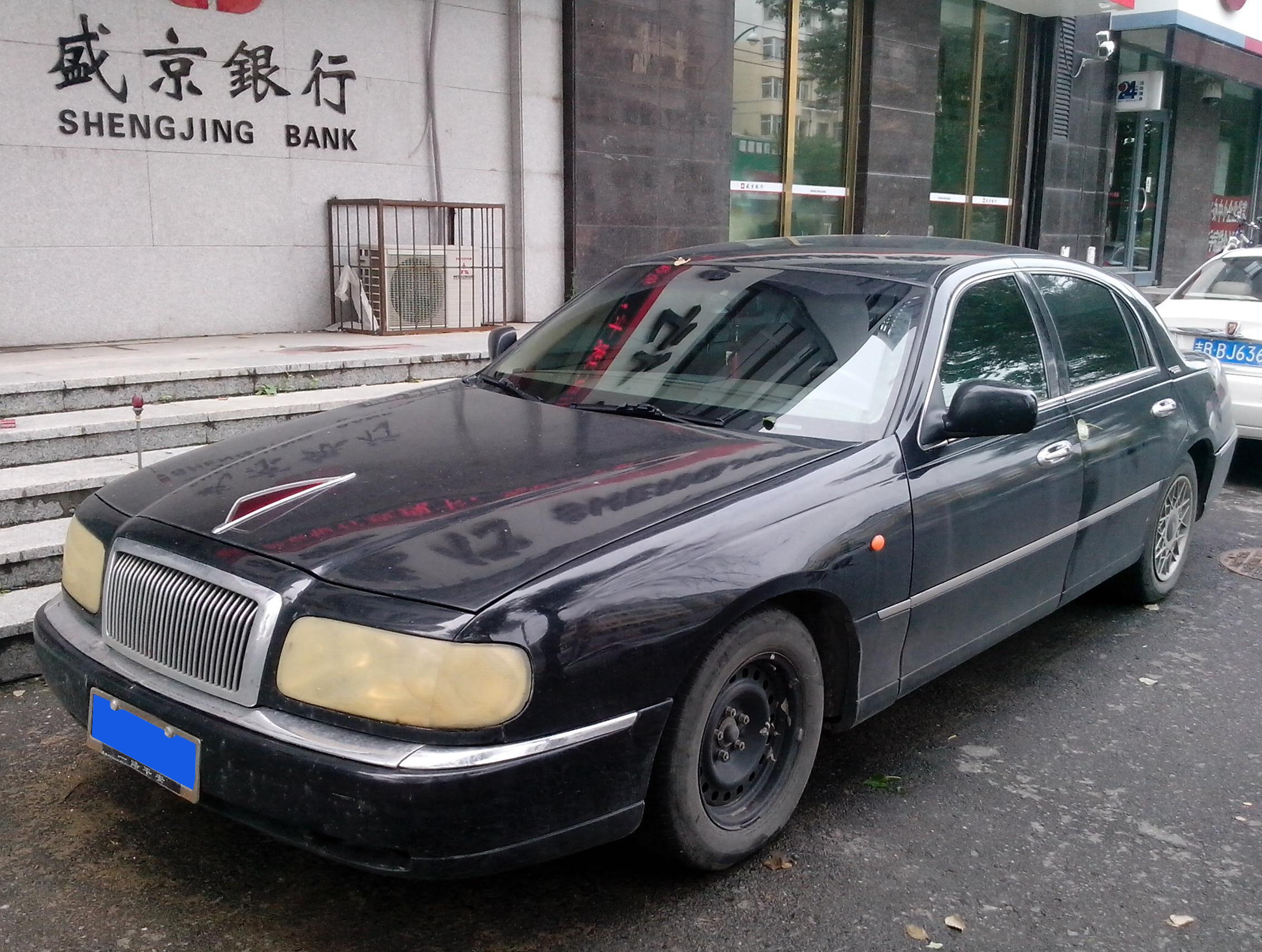
Chinese Hongqi CA7460 (in poor condition)

- The Presidential State Car built for President George H. W. Bush is based upon a 1989 Lincoln Town Car.
  - In line with its predecessors, the vehicle is equipped with armor plating, bulletproof glass, and undisclosed security modifications.
  - To accommodate its higher weight, the vehicle was fitted with a 7.5L V8 (and E4OD transmission) from the F-250 3/4-ton pickup truck.
- The 1993 Aston Martin Lagonda Vignale concept car used a modified Lincoln Town Car chassis and 4.6L V8.
- Two license-built variants of the Lincoln Town Car were assembled by the Chinese automaker Hongqi.
  - During the mid-1990s, the Hongqi CA 7465 was a stretch limousine derived from the 1990–1997 Town Car; the front fascia was styled in line to the 1970s CA770. Approximately 100 were built.
  - The 1998–2005 Hongqi CA7460 (红旗CA7460) and Hongqi Qijian (红旗旗舰) (flagship) were luxury sedans produced primarily for government and military officials. After initial assembly by Ford in the United States, the cars were shipped to China for final bodywork.
- In 2002, Mercury introduced a Mercury Marauder concept car, serving as a preview of the 2003 production vehicle. While the production Marauder was a 4-door sedan, the concept car was a 2-door (topless) convertible. Beginning life as a 1999 Ford Crown Victoria, the concept car was the first full-size convertible from Ford Motor Company since 1971.

== Discontinuation ==
Following the 2003 chassis redesign of the Panther platform, during most of the 2000s, Ford Motor Company began consideration of design efforts towards a rear-wheel-drive successor to the chassis architecture. Intended for release by the end of the 2000s, an all-new platform would be the first truly new rear-wheel-drive full-size chassis from Ford in three decades; another key objective was to consolidate the Panther chassis and the slightly smaller EA169 platform of Ford Australia (underpinning the Ford Falcon sedan and Ford Territory wagon, with the long-wheelbase Ford Fairlane/LTD nearly matching the Crown Victoria/Grand Marquis in wheelbase). During the mid-2000s, Ford debuted several concept vehicles (Ford 427, Lincoln MKR, and Ford Interceptor), previewing potential designs of rear-wheel drive Ford and Lincoln-Mercury full-size sedans. While none of the concept vehicles reached production in their entirety, design elements of each vehicle appeared in multiple Ford and Lincoln sedans.

For the 2005 model year, Ford introduced its first front-wheel-drive full-size chassis, the Ford D3 platform. Derived from a Volvo chassis architecture, the D3 chassis underpinned the Ford Five Hundred and Mercury Montego. While the latter was sold alongside the larger Grand Marquis, the Five Hundred was phased in as a replacement for both the Ford Taurus and Crown Victoria. By 2007, the Crown Victoria was supported nearly entirely by fleet sales, outselling only the Ford GT in retail sales.

After the 2007 model year, Ford ended retail sales of the Crown Victoria, with the Five Hundred renamed as the Ford Taurus; further retail sales were adopted by Lincoln-Mercury. As part of The Way Forward, Lincoln Town Car production shifted from Wixom Assembly and was consolidated with Ford and Mercury at St. Thomas Assembly in Canada.

In January 2009, Ford announced that design efforts towards its global rear-wheel-drive platform were cancelled. The same year, Ford announced that 2011 marked the final year of the Crown Victoria Police Interceptor, with production of a successor to follow for 2012. 2011 would slowly mark the phaseout of both Panther-platform production and of vehicle production at St. Thomas Assembly. On January 4, the final Grand Marquis was manufactured, becoming the final Mercury vehicle ever produced. During August, the final Lincoln Town Car was manufactured.

For the 2012 model year, all Crown Victorias were produced for export; as the vehicle was not produced with stability control, it was no longer legal for sale in the United States or Canada. A short run of Crown Victorias were produced for GCC export (Middle East); intended for export to Saudi Arabia, the final Ford Crown Victoria was manufactured on September 15, 2011, ending production at St. Thomas Assembly.

While the closure of the Mercury division would leave the Grand Marquis without a direct successor, by the end of production, Ford introduced functional replacements for the Crown Victoria/Police Interceptor and Lincoln Town Car (in the sixth-generation Ford Taurus/Police Interceptor Sedan and Lincoln MKS, respectively). With the exception of the Police Interceptor Sedan, sales of the Taurus and MKS shifted from a high dependence on fleet customers to a higher proportion of retail sales. The Lincoln Town Car name made its return for livery customers, with Lincoln developing a livery/limousine variant of the Lincoln MKT with the MKT Town Car name.
