= Ford LTD Crown Victoria =

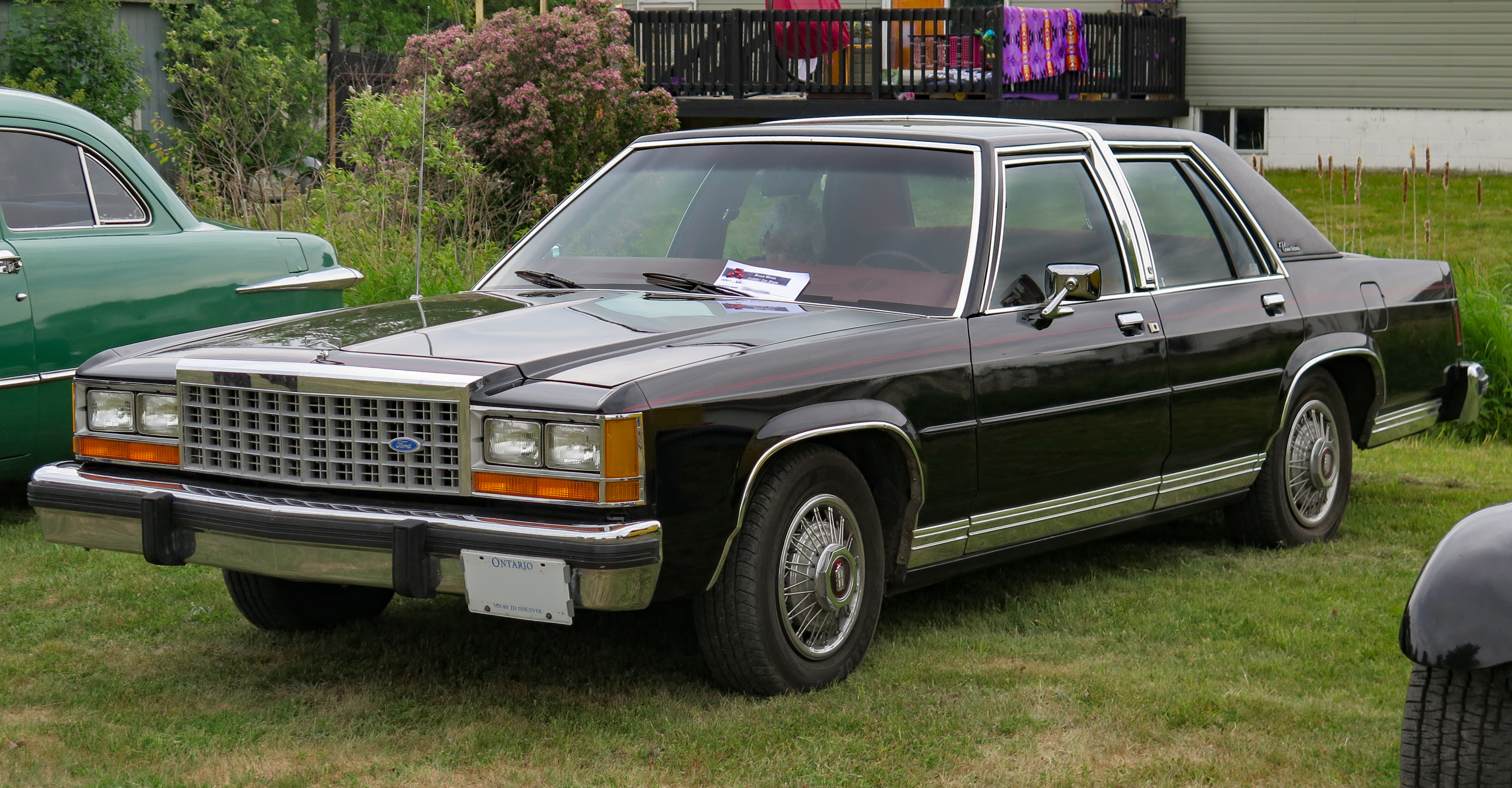
- 1987 Ford LTD Crown Victoria LX

Overview
- Manufacturer: Ford
- Also called: Ford LTD Landau (1979)
- Production: 1979–1990
- Model years: 1980–1991
- Assembly: United States: Atlanta Assembly (Hapeville, Georgia); Los Angeles Assembly (Pico Rivera, California); Louisville Assembly Plant (Louisville, Kentucky); St. Louis Assembly (Hazelwood, Missouri); Canada: Oakville Assembly (Oakville, Ontario); St. Thomas Assembly (Southwold, Ontario)

Body and chassis
- Class: Full-size
- Body style: 2-door sedan 4-door sedan 5-door station wagon
- Platform: Ford Panther platform
- Related: Mercury Grand Marquis; Lincoln Town Car; Continental Mark VI

Powertrain
- Engine: 4.2 L (255 cu in) Windsor V8; 4.9 L (302 cu in) Windsor V8; 5.8 L (351 cu in) Windsor V8
- Transmission: 4-speed AOD automatic

Dimensions
- Wheelbase: 114.3 in (2,903 mm) (sedan)
- Length: 211 in (5,359 mm) (sedan); 215.7 in (5,479 mm) (1990–91 wagon); 216 in (5,486 mm) (1988–89 wagon)
- Width: 77.5 in (1,968 mm) (sedan); 79.3 in (2,014 mm) (wagon)
- Height: 55.6 in (1,412 mm) (sedan); 56.5 in (1,435 mm) (wagon)

Chronology
- Predecessor: Ford LTD
- Successor: Ford Crown Victoria

The Ford LTD Crown Victoria is a line of full-size cars that was manufactured and marketed by Ford from the 1980 to 1991 model years. Deriving its name from the Ford Fairlane coupe of 1955–1956, the LTD Crown Victoria served as the flagship of the Ford LTD model range in North America. Serving as the Ford counterpart of the Mercury Grand Marquis, the model line was offered as a two-door and a four-door sedan and a five-door station wagon (including the woodgrained LTD Country Squire).

For 1983, Ford revised its full-size and mid-size product ranges across all three of its divisions; the LTD Crown Victoria remained the sole full-size Ford sedan with the mid-size Granada taking on the LTD name. Following a minor update for the 1988 model year, the LTD Crown Victoria was discontinued after the 1991 model year, replaced by the redesigned Ford Crown Victoria (dropping the station wagon body style and retiring the LTD prefix).

Through its production, the LTD Crown Victoria was produced by Ford at several different facilities. At launch, it was built at the Louisville, Los Angeles, Atlanta, and Oakville plants. By 1982, Oakville was the sole assembly location, and the following year production was added alongside the Mercury Grand Marquis at St. Louis Assembly in Hazelwood, Missouri. Canadian production shifted from Oakville to St. Thomas Assembly in Southwold, Ontario for 1984 models; the facility would become the exclusive production site a year later, producing the LTD Crown Victoria until 1991.

== Name etymology ==
The first time Ford used "Victoria" as a naming convention was 1932, for both Ford Victoria and Lincoln Victoria 2-door coupes.

The model directly derives its name from the Ford Fairlane Crown Victoria of 1955–1956, the 1980 LTD Crown Victoria revived a distinctive styling feature from its Fairlane namesake: a targa-style band atop the B-pillars. The Fairlane used a bright chrome band; for a more contemporary appearance, the LTD Crown Victoria was styled with a band of brushed aluminum.

In the landaulet-style of the Lincoln Town Car, the LTD Crown Victoria was fitted with a half-length padded vinyl roof, with the brushed-aluminum band covering the B-pillars (in place of the "coach lamps" of the Mercury Grand Marquis). In the style of the original 1965 Ford LTD, the LTD Crown Victoria featured a "crested" hood ornament.

== Overview ==
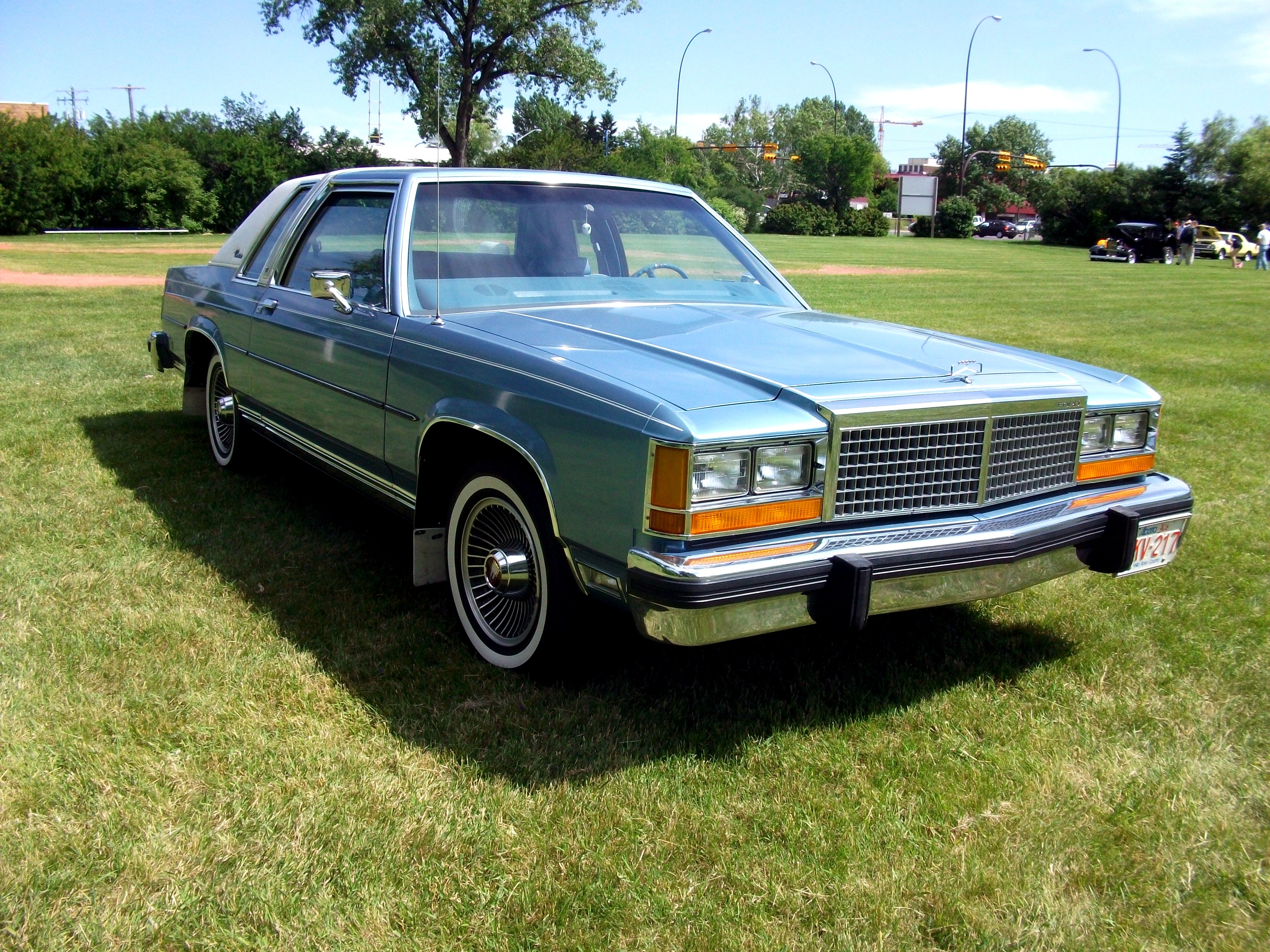
1981 Ford LTD Crown Victoria two-door sedan

For 1980, Ford revised its year-old Ford LTD range, with the LTD Crown Victoria replacing the LTD Landau as its top-level trim. Along with matching the Mercury Grand Marquis directly for the first time, the LTD Crown Victoria took over for the LTD Landau as a competitor for the Chevrolet Caprice and Pontiac Bonneville, alongside the Dodge St. Regis.

As Ford originally slated for its full-size car lines to be replaced by the Ford Taurus in the early 1980s, the LTD Crown Victoria saw relatively little change throughout its production. Fuel prices stabilized as the 1980s progressed, leading to increased demand for the model line, with Ford reversing course, producing both the Taurus and its full-size lines.

For 1988 and 1990, the LTD Crown Victoria underwent multiple revisions and updates. Following a shortened 1991 model year, the LTD Crown Victoria was replaced by the Ford Crown Victoria for 1992. The redesigned model line (dropping the LTD prefix) underwent extensive body, chassis, and powertrain upgrades, remaining in production through 2011. The 2012 model year was the last, but due to government CAFE fuel efficiency standards, all 2012 models were for export only to the Middle East, where they were extremely popular.

=== Chassis ===
The Ford LTD Crown Victoria uses the rear-wheel drive Ford Panther platform architecture. As part of a major downsizing over the 1973-1978 LTD Brougham/Landau, the LTD Crown Victoria shed 18 inches of length and nearly 1000 pounds of curb weight. While the Panther chassis was all-new, the basic suspension layout was carried over, adopting a double wishbone independent front suspension and a coil-sprung live rear axle. The front brakes were vented discs with rear drums.

==== Powertrain ====
For its 1980 introduction, Ford produced the LTD Crown Victoria with two engines, both of them V8s: a 130 hp (97 kW) 4.9 L V8 (the previous 302, rounded up to 5.0 L by Ford) was standard, with a 140 hp (100 kW) 5.8 L V8 (351) as an option. The Ford C4 3-speed automatic transmission was paired to both V8 engines.

For 1981, Ford took additional steps to increase the fuel efficiency of its full-size vehicles. A smaller-displacement V8 became the standard engine, with Ford adding a 120 hp (89 kW) 4.2 L V8. Following its introduction on the Lincoln Town Car and Continental Mark VI, the LTD Crown Victoria received throttle-body "electronic central fuel injection" for the 4.9 L V8, replacing the two-barrel variable-venturi carburetor. From Lincoln, the AOD overdrive 4-speed automatic transmission was paired with the 4.2 L V8 and was an option with the two larger V8s. For 1982, the AOD replaced the 3-speed automatic entirely.

For 1983, the engine line was revised, as Ford ended production of the 4.2 L V8 across all model lines. The 5.0 L effectively became the only engine available, as the 5.8 L carbureted V8 became restricted to fleet sales (particularly police vehicles); in Canada, it remained an option through 1991. For 1984, the engine received an OBD-I compliant Ford EEC-IV computer, raising output to 140 hp (100 kW) (155 hp (116 kW) optional).

For 1986, the 5.0 L V8 underwent further revision, replacing the throttle-body fuel injection intake with a redesigned multiport "Sequential-Fire" system (distinguished by its large cast-aluminum air intake manifold), raising output to 150 hp. A dual-exhaust system was introduced for 1990 as an option (adding 10 hp).

For 1991, the 150 hp 5.0 L V8 remained standard, with the 180 hp 5.8 L V8 offered for fleet sales (subject to gas-guzzler taxes) and in Canada; the final American-assembled vehicles sold with a carbureted engine, the latter V8 included the Motorcraft 7200 variable-venturi carburetor in use since 1979.

=== Body ===
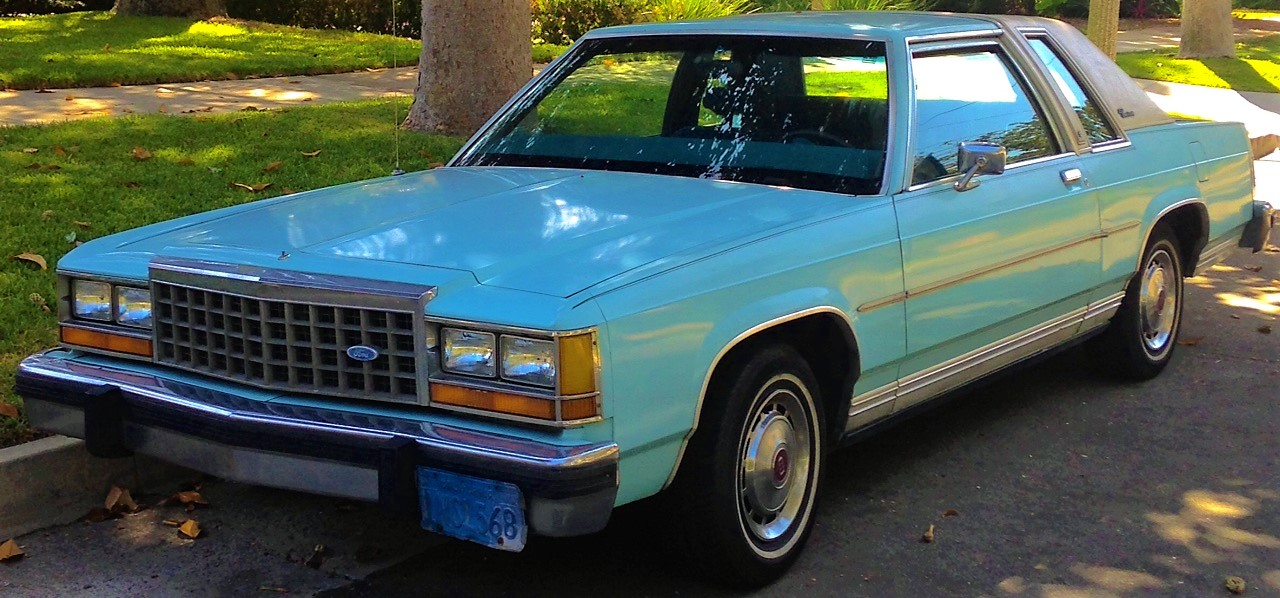
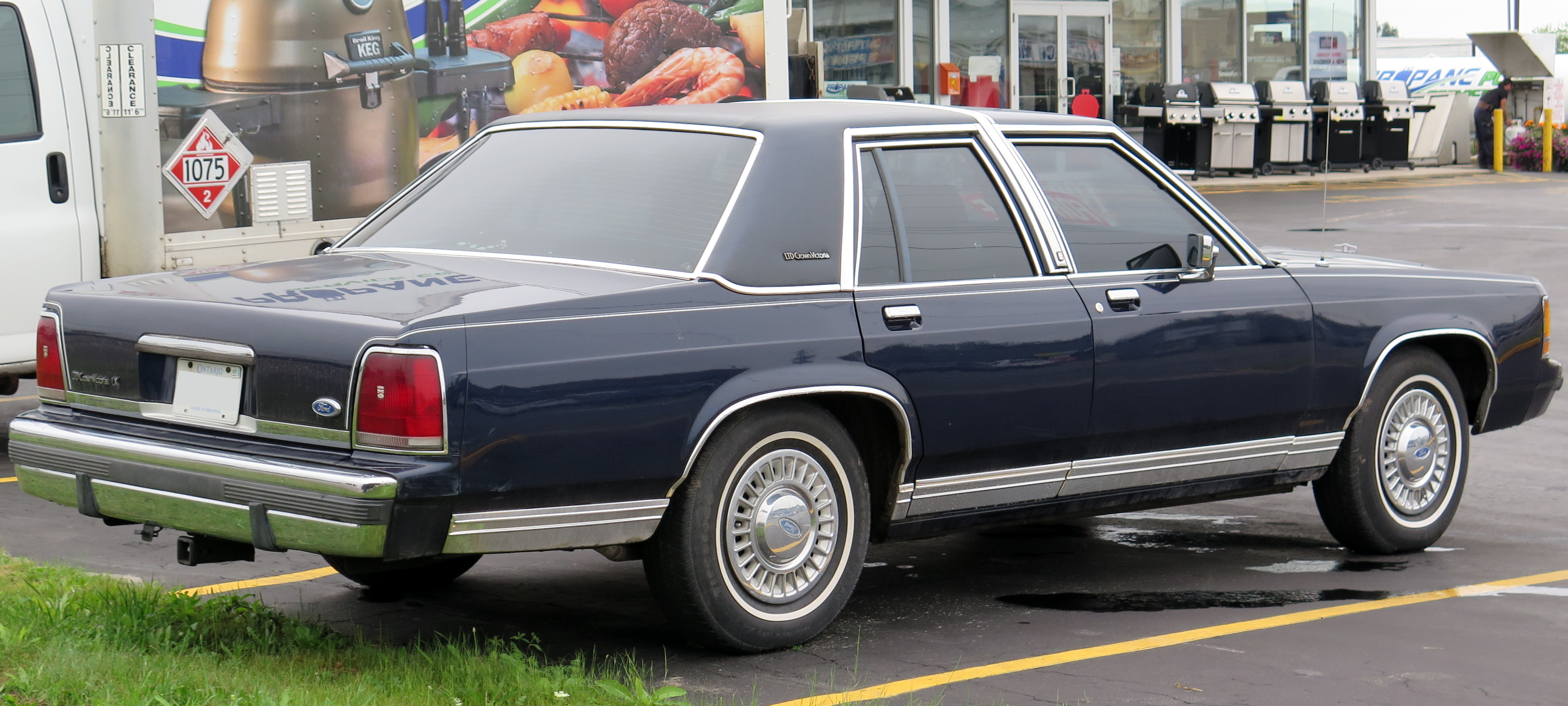
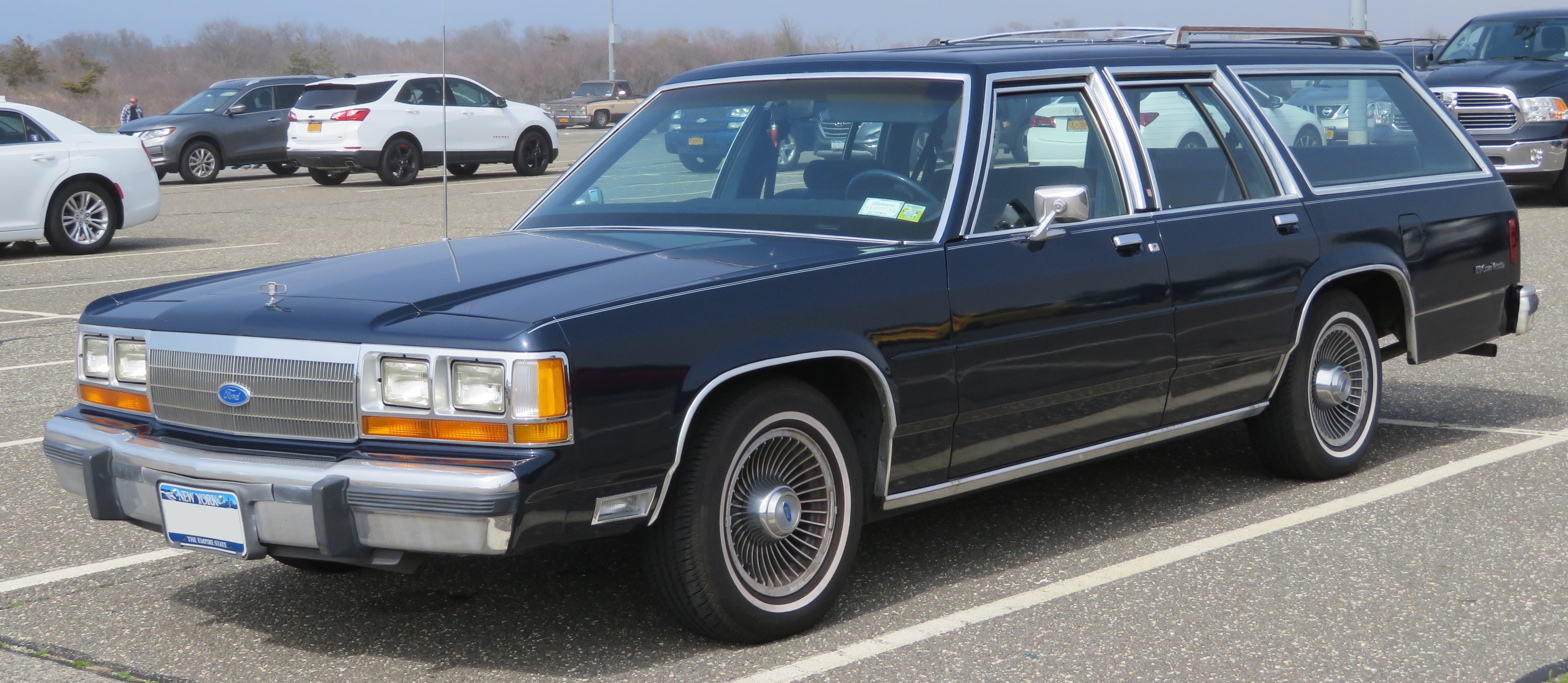
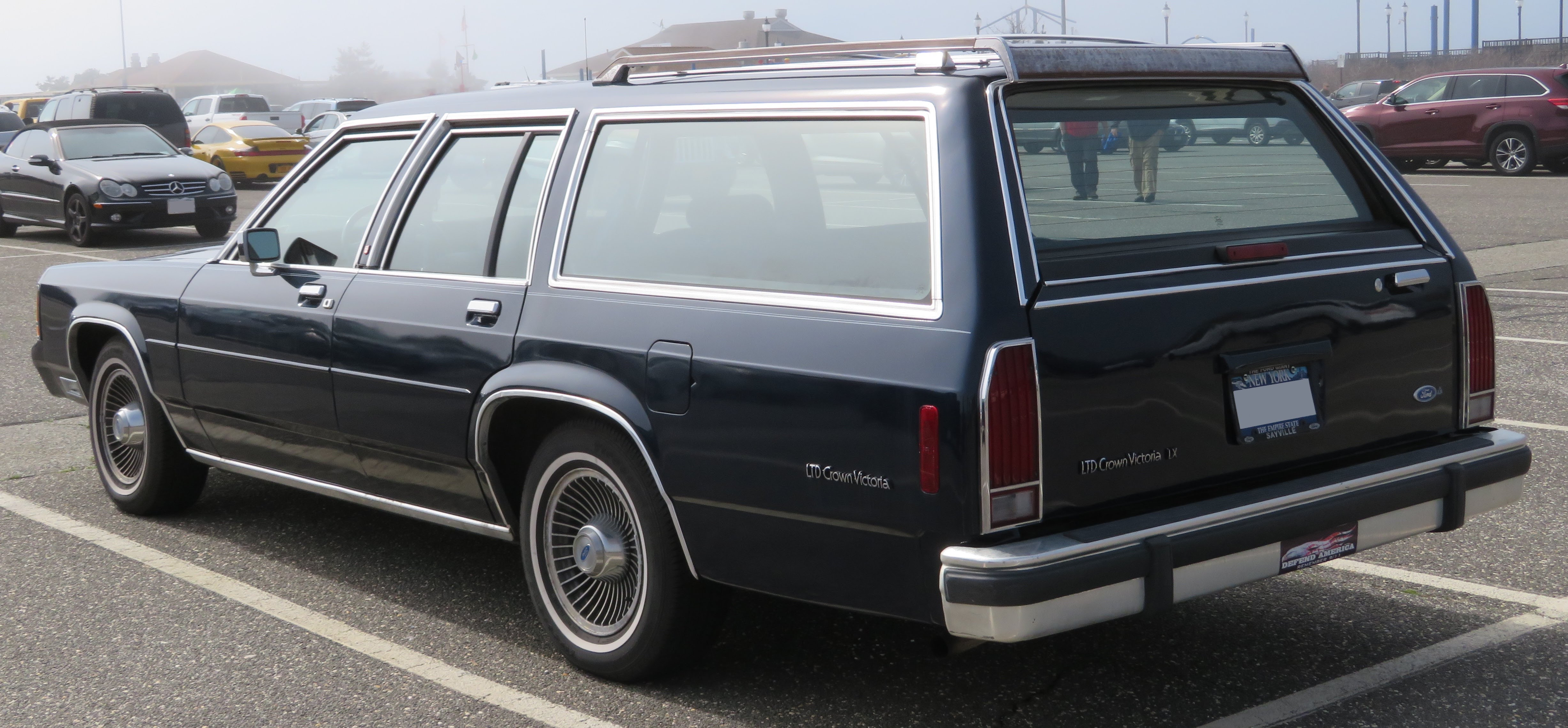
Top row: 1984 LTD Crown Victoria four-door (front, rear), 1985 LTD Crown Victoria two-door

Center row: 1989 Ford LTD Crown Victoria LX four-door (front, rear)

Bottom row: 1990 Ford LTD Crown Victoria LX (non-wood trim) 5-door station wagon (front, rear)

When introduced for the 1980 model year, the LTD Crown Victoria was offered in two-door sedan and four-door sedan body styles; a five-door station wagon was offered as the wood-paneled LTD Country Squire. The body underwent a minor roofline revision over the 1979 LTD Landau, distinguished by a brushed-aluminum band covering the B-pillars. A half-length vinyl roof was standard; on fleet vehicles (such as police cars), the vinyl roof was a delete option.

For 1981, the sideview mirrors were remounted and relocated rearward. For 1982, Ford phased out FORD lettering on both the grille and trunklid, phasing in the Ford Blue Oval emblem (the grille emblem was offset to the drivers' side). For 1983, the exterior received a revised grille design; the taillamp lenses were also redesigned (distinguished by the deletion of the LTD script).

For 1984, a station wagon without woodgrain paneling was introduced, joining the Country Squire. For four door sedans, a "Brougham" full-length vinyl roof with a more formal roofline profile (including a "frenched" rear window) was introduced as an option.

For 1985, the dashboard underwent multiple updates. The climate and audio controls were redesigned (the latter, to fit a single-DIN slot); the change led to the retirement of the 8-track cassette and CB radio options. In a major functional upgrade, the controls for the horn were relocated from the turn-signal stalk to the steering-wheel hub. As a running change by the end of the model year, a center brake light was added (on the rear parcel shelf of sedans, below the rear window of station wagons). For 1987, Ford standardized an electronic dashboard clock, tinted glass, and air conditioning (the latter remained offered as a delete option on fleet vehicles).

Following the 1987 model year, the two-door LTD Crown Victoria sedan was discontinued (only 5,527 were sold in comparison to 105,789 four-door sedans in 1987, down from 6,291 in 1986). Demand for two-door vehicles had shifted towards sportier designs (such as the Thunderbird and the Mustang), leaving the compact Tempo as the only 1988 Ford model line sold as both a two-door and a four-door sedan.

==== 1988 update ====
After nine years in the marketplace, the LTD Crown Victoria underwent a mid-cycle revision for 1988. To (nominally) improve the aerodynamics of the exterior, the front and rear fascias were restyled, rounding the edges of the fenders slightly; while still protruding outward substantially, the bumpers were better integrated within the body. While the roofline and doors were carried over, other changes sought to modernize the design. Coinciding with enlarged taillamps (wrapping into the fenders), the trunklid was changed in shape (with a larger license-plate opening). The grille was lowered in height and widened, integrating the headlamps and turn signal lenses into a single assembly (the Ford Blue Oval emblem was enlarged and centered). The interior underwent a separate revision; the interior received an increase of wood trim (on LX-trim models), redesigned seats with pivoting head restraints on LX models, and a more legible speedometer.

For 1990, the model line received further interior updates, necessitated by passive-safety regulations. For the first time since 1979, the dashboard and steering wheel underwent a complete redesign (reversing the placement of the audio and climate controls); a driver-side airbag was introduced as standard equipment (for all versions). To comply with federal safety regulations, three-point seatbelts were added to the outboard rear seats. Ford standardized many previously optional features to streamline production costs and increase the market appeal of the decade-old model line, including power windows and locks, tilt steering, and automatic headlights (AutoLamp); air conditioning was no longer a delete option. To further reduce production costs, the LTD Crown Victoria and Mercury Grand Marquis shared a nearly identical interior (with only detail changes distinguishing the two). The pivoting front head restraints on the LX models were dropped, as were the optional front pivoting vent windows, making the 1989 LTD Crown Victoria and Grand Marquis one of the last passenger cars to offer this feature.

For its final year, relatively few changes were made to the LTD Crown Victoria for 1991. Ford changed the parking light lenses in color from amber to clear, last seen on the 1979 base-trim Ford LTD, optional two-tone paint was discontinued.

=== Trim levels ===
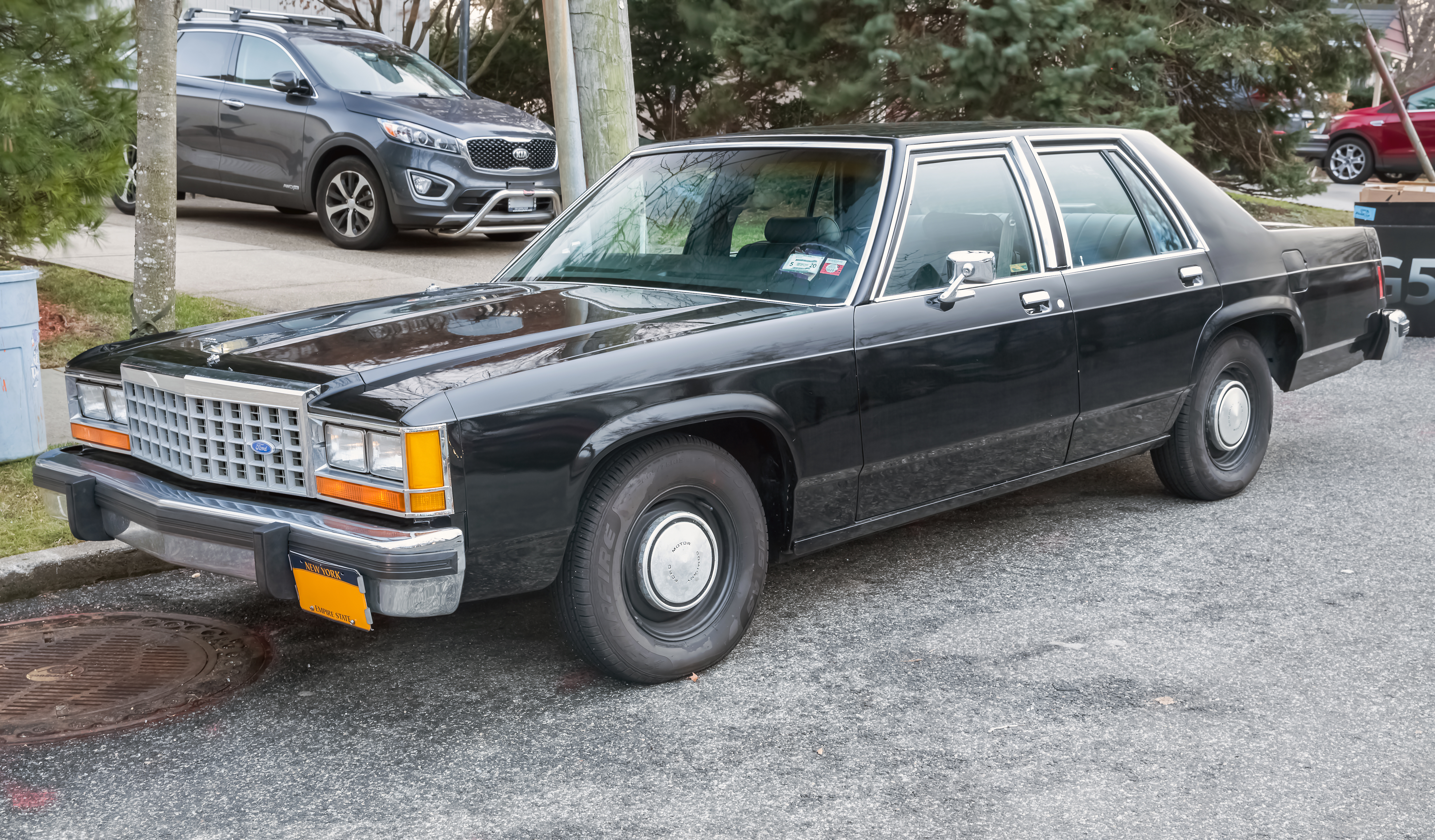
1986 Ford LTD Crown Victoria S four-door sedan as seen in the film Men In Black

From 1980 to 1982, Ford marketed the LTD Crown Victoria name as the highest-trim version of the Ford LTD. For 1983, Ford enacted an extensive revision of its full-size and mid-size vehicles, affecting both Ford and Lincoln-Mercury in North America. The Ford brand split the LTD nameplate into two product ranges, with the 1979-1982 full-size LTD renamed the LTD Crown Victoria and the LTD nameplate adopted for its mid-size sedan, replacing the Granada (updated and renamed for 1983).

The standard-trim LTD Crown Victoria was intended for retail markets, coming with the 5.0 L V8 engine as standard. In addition to the landau-style vinyl padded roof with targa-style trim and wire wheel covers, the model featured full carpeting, reclining cloth bench seat, and AM/FM radio.

Inheriting the trim range from the 1979-1982 LTD, the LTD Crown Victoria was initially sold in a single trim level, with the previous LTD Crown Victoria repackaged as an Interior Luxury Group option, including upgraded seats, door panels, and upgraded interior features. For 1986, the option package was reintroduced as the LTD Crown Victoria LX. Effectively serving as a direct Ford counterpart of the Grand Marquis, the LX offered split-bench seats (cloth or leather), upgraded interior carpet, additional sound insulation and power-operated features, and upgraded stereo systems. The exterior of the LX offered cornering lamps, two-tone paint, and standard aluminum-alloy wheels.

While the model had previously been sold for fleet sales, the S model returned for 1987 as a dedicated fleet-sales model. Sold primarily for police and taxi sales, the S trim was externally distinguished by its vinyl roof delete, steel wheels and partial wheel covers, and the lack of a hood ornament and aluminum B-pillar trim. The interior of S trim vehicles were spartan, including vinyl full bench seats, manual windows/locks, AM radios; features such as AM/FM radios and air conditioning were options. Alongside fleet sales, the S trim was the standard trim of the LTD Crown Victoria station wagon; it is the only version sold directly to the general public (without woodgrain sides; also offered in standard and LX trim).

From 1988 onward, the LTD Crown Victoria was offered in a namesake standard trim, the LX, and the fleet-oriented S trims.

== Variants ==
=== Station wagon ===
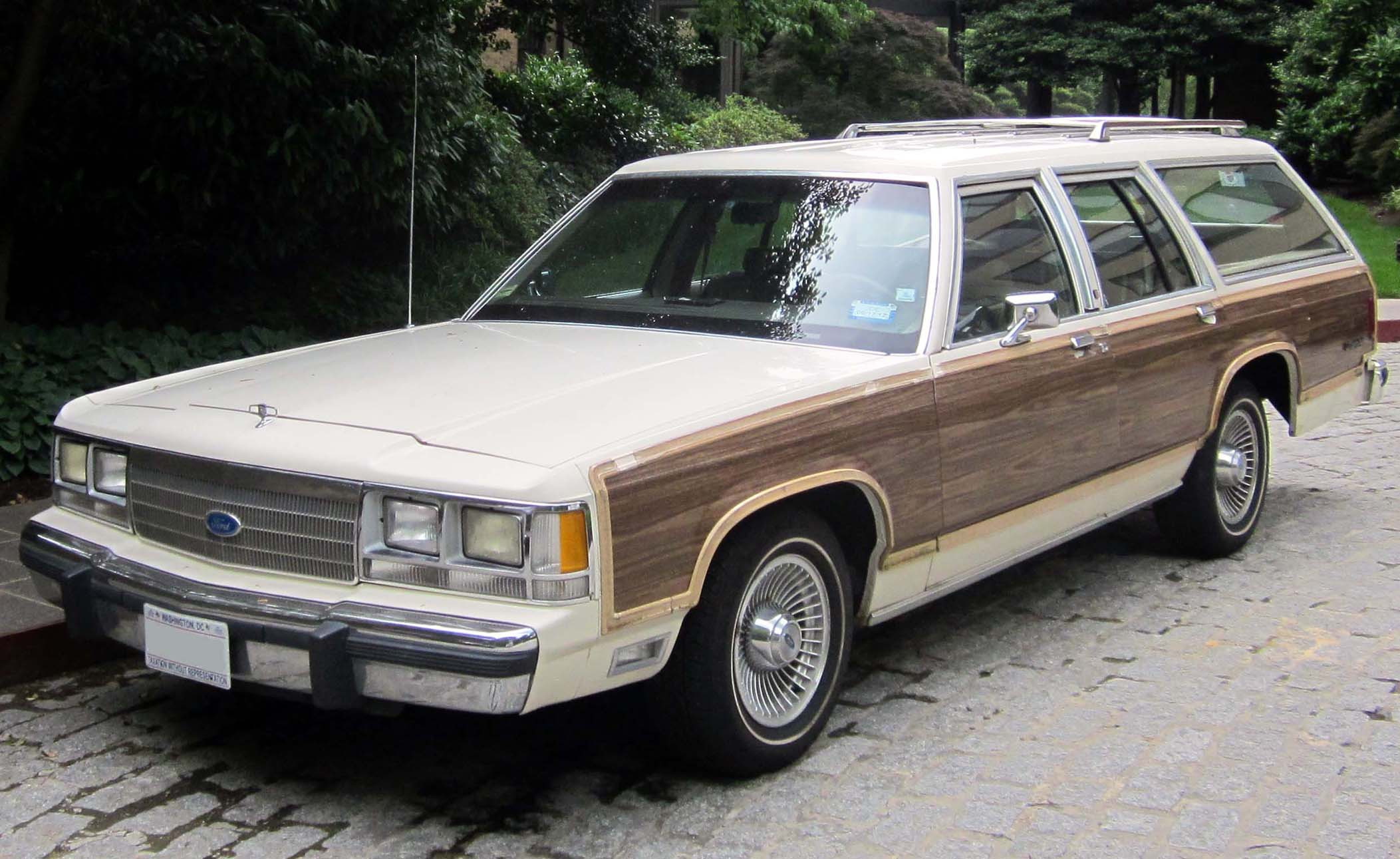
1991 Ford LTD Country Squire (woodgrain trim)

From 1979 to 1991, a five-door station wagon was offered as part of the LTD/LTD Crown Victoria model line. Offered in equivalent trim as sedans, the flagship version remained the wood-trimmed LTD Country Squire, trimmed nearly identically to the LTD Crown Victoria (and the subsequent LTD Crown Victoria LX). On hiatus for the 1983 model year, a non-woodgrain station wagon returned for 1984 under the LTD Crown Victoria nameplate (the previous LTD station wagon); this version was offered in fleet (S) trim, standard trim, and LX trim.

While smaller than its 1970s predecessor, the LTD Crown Victoria/Country Squire wagon returned many of its functional features. The rear door was dual-hinged, allowing it to function as a tailgate or swing outward; other features included a standard roof rack and optional side-facing rear seats (expanding capacity from six to eight). The fleet-oriented S trim lacked the roof rack and the third-row seating (reducing capacity to six).

From the late 1980s into the early 1990s, consumer demand for family vehicles transitioned from large station wagons to minivans and full-size vans, and to four-door sport-utility vehicles. Within Ford, the role of the model line was largely overtaken by the Ford Aerostar and the Ford Econoline/Club Wagon; the Country Squire also struggled to compete with the newer Ford Taurus station wagon (also sold with optional third-row seating). After the 1991 model year, the station wagon body style was dropped from the model line, as the 1992 Ford Crown Victoria was introduced only as a four-door sedan.

=== Fleet use ===
Marketed primarily for fleet usage, including law enforcement, taxi, and other fleet markets, the LTD Crown Victoria S was base trim of the model line, slotted below the standard trim sold to retail markets (under the production code P72). To lower production costs, a number of convenience features were removed from the S trim, distinguished by its lack of a vinyl roof. Along with most bodyside chrome trim, other exterior and interior trim was decontented, including lower-grade carpeting, a standard AM radio, and single-piece front bench seat.

In the United States, the 5.8 L V8 was restricted to fleet sale after 1982 (outside of law enforcement sales, examples were subject to gas-guzzler taxes).

==== Law enforcement use (Police Package) ====
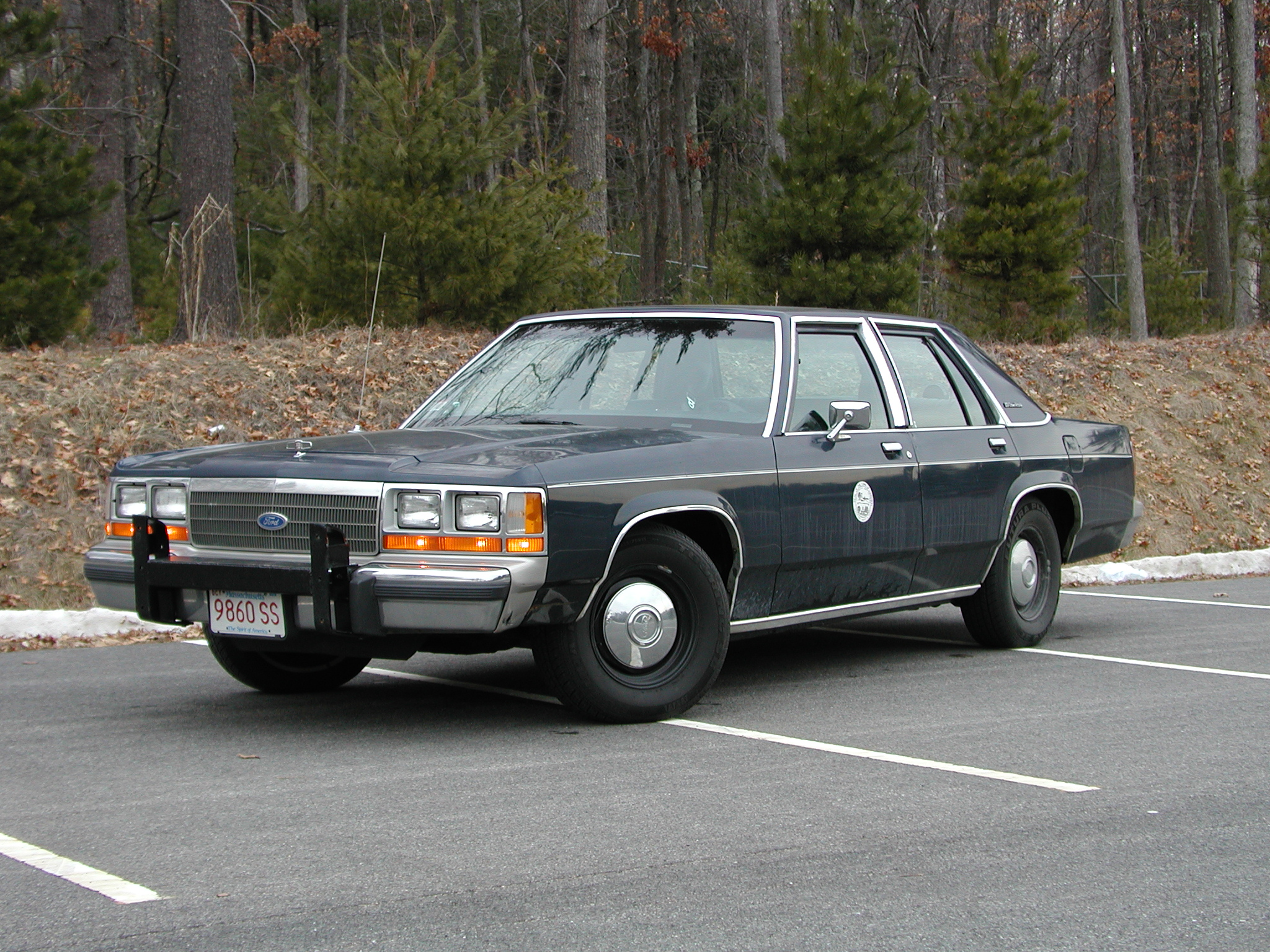
1990 Ford LTD Crown Victoria police car (unmarked)

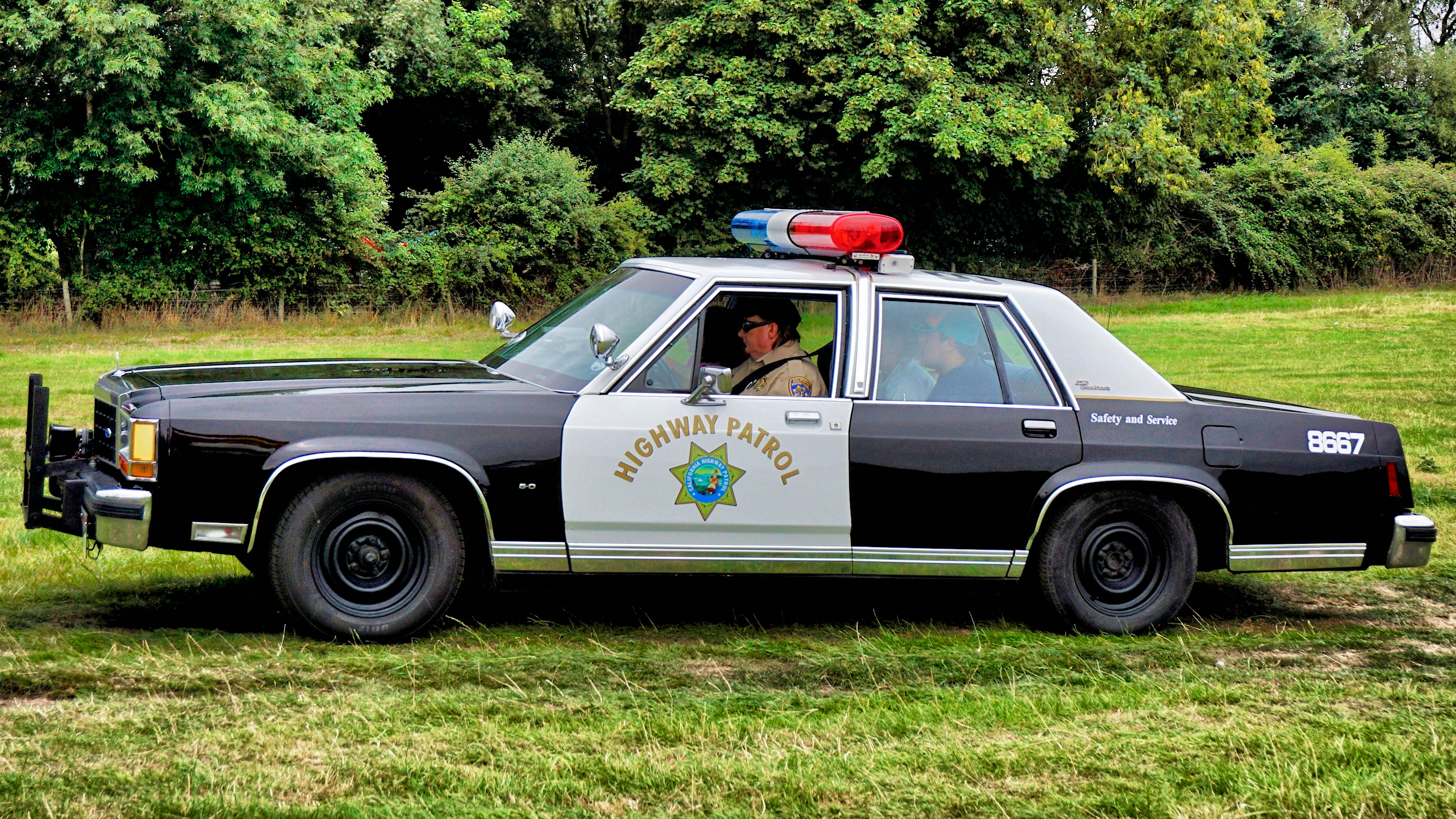
1980s Ford LTD Crown Victoria (LX, note the clear cornering light not available on police versions) exported to the United Kingdom, decaled as a California Highway Patrol cruiser

Through its entire production, Ford produced option packages for the LTD Crown Victoria, optimizing it for usage as a police car. Competing against the Chevrolet Impala/Caprice 9C1 and the Dodge Diplomat/Plymouth Gran Fury, the LTD Crown Victoria with the Police Package was upgraded for heavy-duty use, including a reinforced frame, upgraded suspension and brakes, larger wheels and tires, and improved engine cooling. Other changes were made to accommodate police equipment, including heavy-duty interior materials, provisions for additional lights and sirens, and a 140mph speedometer.

The option package was offered for any sedan trim; while primarily offered on the fleet-oriented S trim, police cars were also offered in the LX trim (including interior carpeting, cloth seats, full wheel covers, and whitewall tires). Other options allowed for multiple vehicles to share a common key. The standard engine was the 5.0 L V8, with a 5.8 L V8 (with up to 180 hp) offered as an option; to avoid "gas guzzler" taxes, customers who ordered the 5.8 L engine were required to prove to the IRS that the vehicle was for law enforcement use.

For the 1992 model year, the option became known as the Ford Crown Victoria P71 (later the Crown Victoria Police Interceptor), with Ford replacing both the 5.0 L and 5.8 L OHV engines with a single 210 hp 4.6 L SOHC V8.

== Production ==
Ford LTD Crown Victoria Production Figures
	Coupe	Sedan	Wagon	Yearly Total
1979	96,319	192,329	67,887	356,535
1980	23,611	92,875	25,076	141,562
1981	17,340	92,561	22,462	132,363
1982	12,797	93,363	21,893	128,053
1983	11,414	81,859	20,343	113,616
1984	12,522	130,164	30,803	173,489
1985	13,673	154,612	30,825	199,110
1986	6,559	97,314	20,164	124,037
1987	5,527	105,789	17,562	128,878
1988	-	110,249	14,940	125,189
1989	-	110,437	12,549	122,986
1990	-	68,178	6,419	74,597
1991	-	91,315	8,000	99,315
Total	199,762	1,421,045	298,923	1,919,730
