= St. Louis Assembly Plant =

Ford Motor's automobile plant in Missouri

Coordinates: 38°46′16″N 90°21′30″W

- Operated: 1948–2006
- Location: 2–58 Ford Lane; Hazelwood, Missouri, United States
- Industry: Automotive
- Products: Ford Explorer; Mercury Mountaineer
- Employees: 1,400 (2006)
- Area: 155 acres (0.63 km^{2})
- Volume: 2,500,000 square feet (230,000 m^{2})
- Owner: Ford Motor Company

St. Louis Assembly Plant was an automobile factory owned by Ford Motor Company in Hazelwood, Missouri. It was opened in 1948 and was closed in 2006; it was idled as part of Ford's "The Way Forward" plan. The plant was demolished in 2009.

== Closure ==
On January 11, 2002, it was announced that the St. Louis Assembly Plant would be closed by 2004, along with the Edison Assembly Plant in Edison, New Jersey, the Ontario Truck Plant in Oakville, Ontario, the Cleveland Aluminum Casting Plant in Brook Park, Ohio, and the Vulcan Forge Plant in Dearborn, Michigan.

== Product lines at closure ==
- Ford Explorer
- Mercury Mountaineer

== Historical products ==
- Lincoln Aviator (2003-2005)
- Ford Aerostar (1986–1997)
- Mercury Grand Marquis (1983–1985)
- Ford LTD Crown Victoria (1983–1985)
- Mercury Marquis (1967–1982)
- Mercury Monterey (1974)
- Mercury Marauder (1963–1965, 1969–1970)
- Mercury Park Lane
- Mercury Montclair
- Mercury Eight
- Ford Galaxie
- Ford LTD

== See also ==
- List of Ford factories
