= Ford LTD =

Ford LTD may refer to:

- Ford LTD (Australia), a full-size car manufactured by Ford Australia from 1973 to 2007
- Ford LTD (Americas), an automobile produced by the Ford Motor Company in North America from 1965 through 1986
- Ford Galaxie, an automobile marketed as the Ford LTD in Brazil and produced by Ford Brasil from 1967 to 1983
