= Old Maizeland School =

California historic landmark

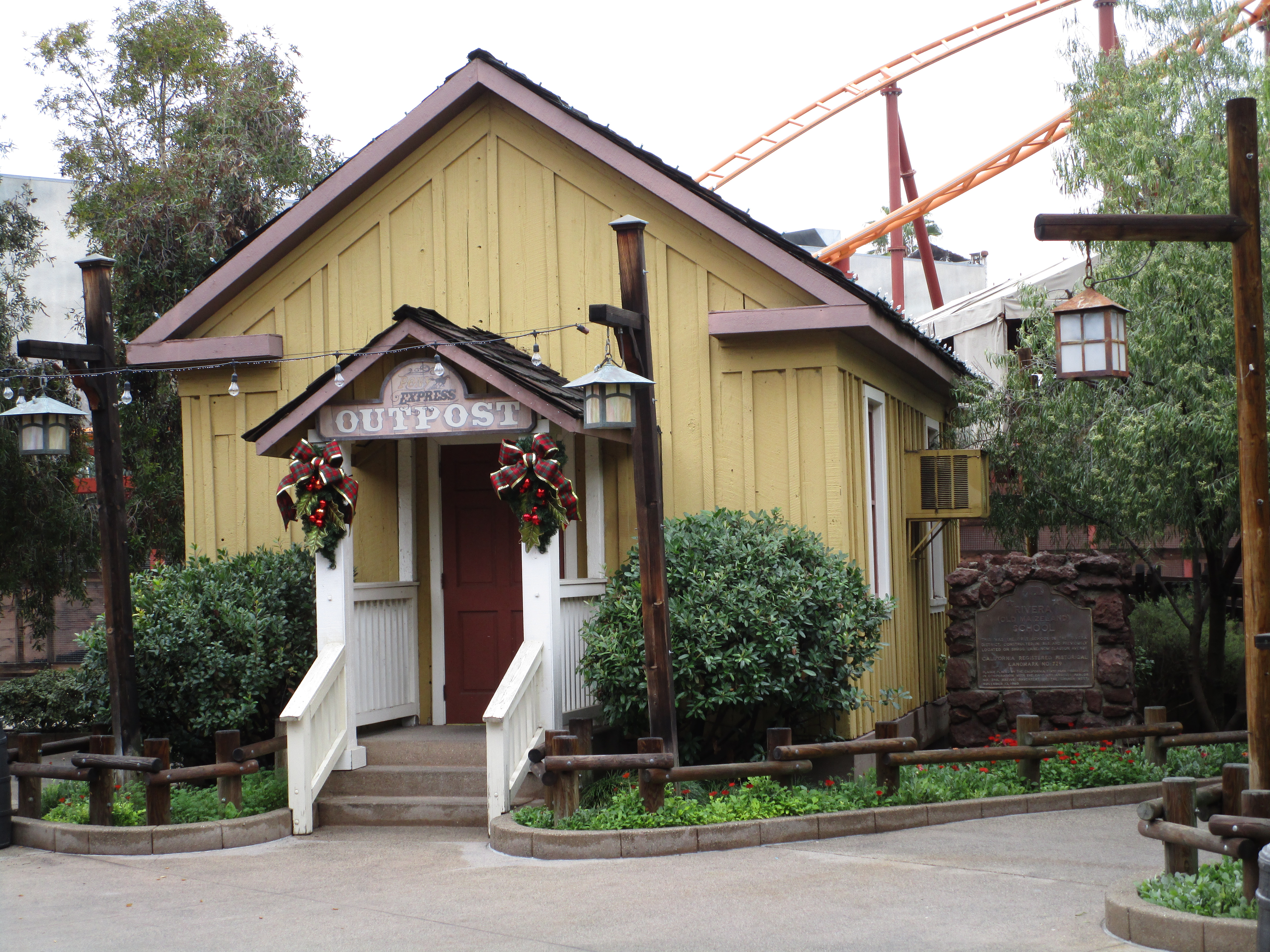
- Old Maizeland School

- Location within California
- 33°50′36″N 118°00′03″W
- Location: Knott's Berry Farm, California

History
- Built: 1868

Site notes
- Architectural style: Wood

California Historical Landmark
- Designated: April 8, 1960
- Reference no.: 729

The Old Maizeland School also called the Rivera School was designated a California Historic Landmark (No.729) on April 8, 1960. The Old Maizeland School was built in 1868 in what is today Pico Rivera, California, by James C. Shugg. James C. Shugg had five children: Alydia Caroline Shugg Gooch (1854–1938), Joannah Shugg Story (1857–1938), Thomas Shugg (1859–1902), Martha Jane Shugg Allison(1862–1946) and William E. Shugg (1863–1929). James C. Shugg and his wife, Esther Caroline Graham Shugg (1835–1908) (married in 1852), wanted each child to have a good education and built the school on his land. For 27 years it served as the school house in what was called the Rivera District, at 8910 East Shugg Lane, now called Slauson Avenue. The pioneers used the Rivera School District school house to teach their children. In 1896, being too small for teaching now, it was sold, moved to a nearby farm of Ablbert McDonald and use as storage shed. In 1950 the school house was seen as historical building and to be moved to the Rivera School District grounds and restored to be a school museum. The museum idea did not work and a year later the school was put up for sale.

In the 1920s, Walter Knott and wife Cordelia started a roadside stand selling berries and berry preserves alongside State Route 39 in what is now the City of Buena Park. His wife, Cordelia Knott, added fried chicken dinners to the stand and started "Mrs. Knott's Chicken Dinner Restaurant" in 1934. The stand grew and grew with attractions, also fairs. In 1950 with the idea of a theme park and living museum, Knott's Berry Farm, Walter Knott purchased the Maizeland School. He installed the school house at his farm at 8039 Beach Boulevard in Buena Park, California. Today it is used as reptiles, insects and animal physiology museum called the Express Outpost.

== James C. Shugg ==
The original address of the school house, Shugg Lane is named after James C. Shugg born on February 21, 1818, in Helston, Cornwall, England. He came to Milwaukee, Wisconsin, in 1848. He came to California for the California Gold Rush. Traveling the Santa Fe Trail he helped drive Dr. Thomas A. Hereford's mules and cattle west for money arriving in 1853. He purchased land in California and grew walnut trees and oranges trees. At first Shugg grew corn and thus the school house name "Maize". James C. Shugg died on February 20, 1882, at the age of 63 in Downey, California. He is buried at the Broadway Cemetery in Whittier, California.

== 1879 Beloit school house ==
There is another, more prominent school house at Knott's Berry Farm. The Beloit, Kansas school house was built in 1879 and closed in 1947. Walter Knott purchased the school house for $253.50. He had it taken apart and shipped to the theme park in 1951. The Homestead Act of 1862 was signed by President Abraham Lincoln, many families moved west and to Kansas for the chance of free land. To homestead a head of household man over 18 years of age could homestead 160 acres of unclaimed land. The 1879 Beloit School House was built by these homesteaders. The school house is furnished like it was in use in Kansas, as Knott purchased all the building's contents. The 1879 Beloit School House plaque reads In recognition of the value to our nation of the education provided by the one room school house, this plaque is placed on an original one built in 1879, near Beloit, Kansas. Dedicated by Hannah Bushrod Chapter, Daughters of the American Revolution, June 1960.

== Old Maizeland School Marker ==
Marker next to the School House reads:

- This was the first school in the Rivera District, constructed in 1868, and previously located on Shugg Lane, now Slauson Avenue. Erected 1960 by California State Park Commission, The East Los Angeles Parlor No. 266, Native Daughters of the Golden West. (Marker Number 729.)

== See also ==
- California Historical Landmarks in Orange County, California
