= Ford LTD (Americas) =

Model range of Ford automobiles (1965-1986)

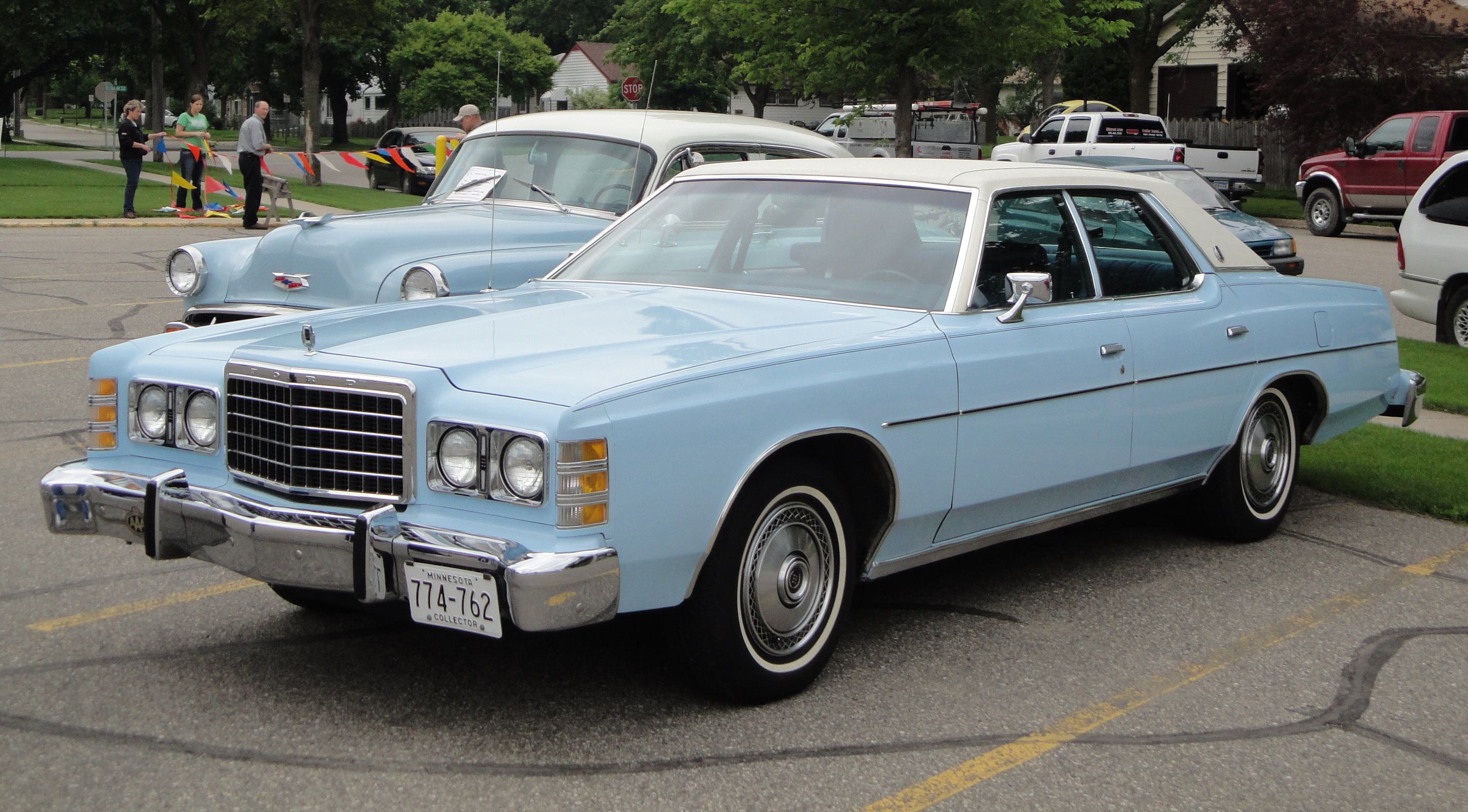
- 1977 Ford LTD 4-door pillared hardtop

Overview
- Manufacturer: Ford
- Model years: 1965–1986

Body and chassis
- Class: Full-size (1965–1982); Mid-size (1983–1986)
- Layout: FR layout

Chronology
- Successor: Ford LTD Crown Victoria (for full-size LTD); Ford Taurus (for mid-size LTD)

The Ford LTD (pronounced ell-TEE-dee) is a range of automobiles manufactured by Ford for the 1965 to 1986 model years. Introduced as the highest trim level of the full-size Ford model range (then the Ford Galaxie 500), the LTD moved the Ford range upmarket, offering options and features previously reserved for Mercury and Lincoln vehicles. For much of its production life, the LTD competed against the Chevrolet Caprice (atop the Chevrolet Impala); the Mercury Marquis served as its divisional counterpart from 1967 until 1986.

For its first three generations, the LTD served as the largest Ford vehicle in North America. Initially debuting as two-door and four-door hardtop sedans, the LTD range at various times would also include two-door and four-door pillared sedans, a two-door convertible, and a five-door station wagon (in woodgrain trim, as the LTD Country Squire). In South America, Ford manufactured the 1966 Ford Galaxie 500 into the 1980s using the Ford LTD nameplate.

From 1977 to 1979, the full-size LTD was joined by the intermediate-segment Ford LTD II (replacing the Ford Torino/Gran Torino range). For 1979, the LTD was downsized; while remaining a full-size car, it became externally smaller than the LTD II. For 1983, the LTD became a mid-size car as it replaced the Ford Granada, with the previous full-size car renamed the Ford LTD Crown Victoria (renamed Ford Crown Victoria for 1992).

For 1986, the mid-size LTD was replaced by the Ford Taurus as Ford expanded its use of front-wheel drive vehicles, with both lines sold for 1986.

== Etymology ==
Nearly 40 years after its discontinuation in North America, the meaning of the LTD designation has never received a full explanation, with several theories behind its meaning.

For the first generation, LTD was speculated to be an abbreviation of either "Luxury Trim Decor" or "Limited" trim designation for the Galaxie 500 (where it served as a luxury-oriented trim level). In the early 1970s, Ford Australia (which had introduced the LTD name on RHD-converted Galaxies in 1969, moving it to locally-produced Fairlanes in mid-1973) had adapted the moniker as "Lincoln Type Design", to build up Lincoln-like exclusivity and design influence of its Falcon-based LTD luxury car (As of current production, Lincoln has never been sold in Australia on an official basis).

In North American sales literature, there is no evidence of LTD used as "Lincoln Type Design" or as an abbreviation for anything else in brochures or advertising copy. The original Car Life review at the time the first Galaxie 500 LTD was released suggests that "LTD" stood for nothing and was ambiguous in meaning.

== First generation (1965–1968) ==
First generation
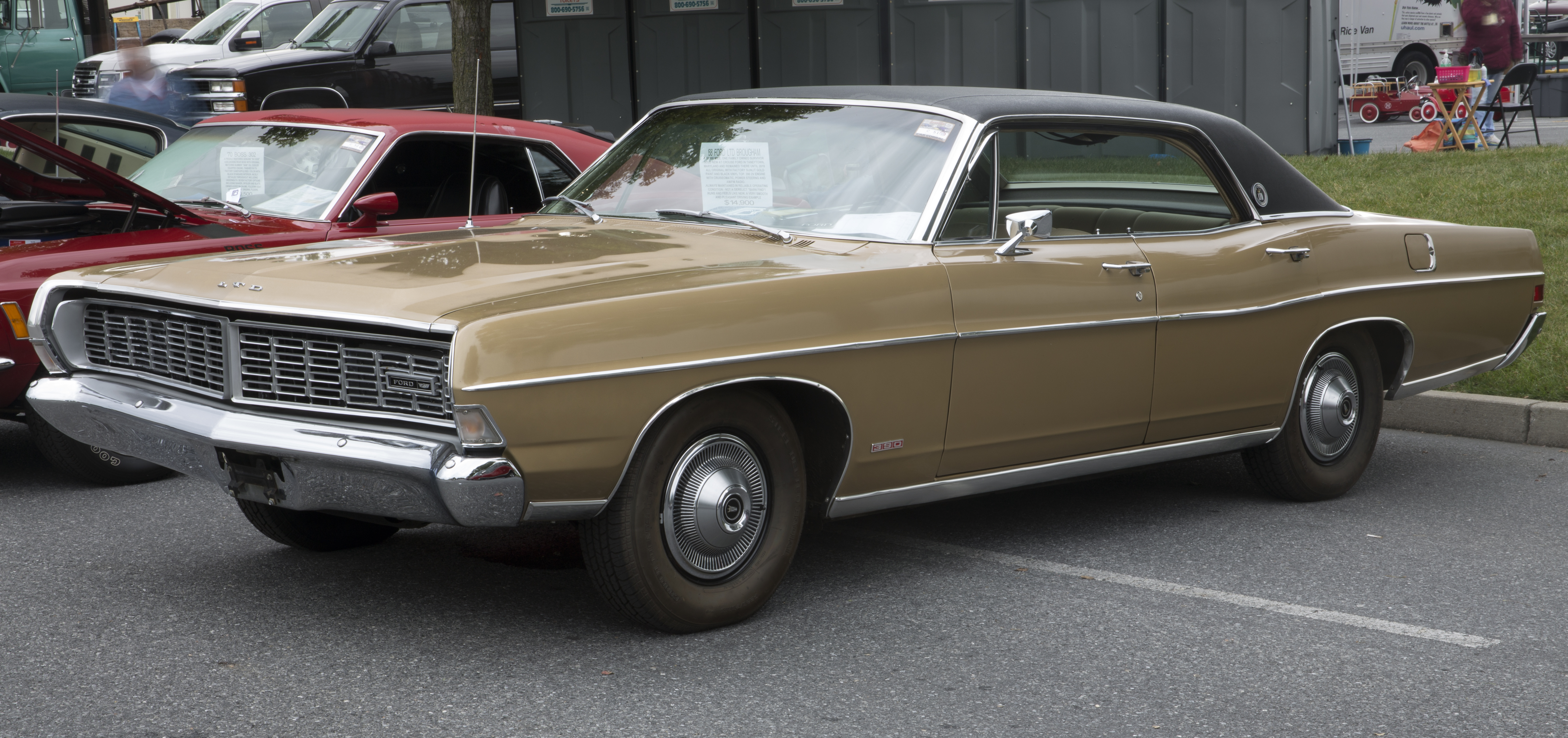
- 1968 Ford LTD 4-door Hardtop

Overview
- Also called: Ford Galaxie 500 LTD (1965)
- Model years: 1965–1968
- Assembly: United States: Louisville, Kentucky (Louisville Assembly Plant); Mahwah, New Jersey (Mahwah Assembly); Pico Rivera, California (Los Angeles Assembly); Atlanta, Georgia (Atlanta Assembly); St. Louis, Missouri (St. Louis Assembly Plant); St. Paul, Minnesota (Twin Cities Assembly Plant); Venezuela: Valencia, Carabobo (Valencia Assembly)

Body and chassis
- Body style: 4-door hardtop 4-door sedan (1967–1968); 2-door coupe 2-door convertible 4-door station wagon.
- Platform: 1965 Ford
- Related: Mercury Park Lane; Mercury Marquis; Mercury Colony Park; Ford Country Squire; Meteor LeMoyne

Powertrain
- Engine: 289 cu in (4.7 L) Challenger/Windsor V8; 302 cu in (4.9 L) Challenger/Windsor V8; 352 cu in (5.8 L) Thunderbird (FE) V8; 390 cu in (6.4 L) Thunderbird Special (FE) V8; 427 cu in (7.0 L) Cobra (FE) V8; 428 cu in (7.0 L) Thunderbird (FE) V8

Dimensions
- Wheelbase: 119 in (3,023 mm)

For the 1965 model year, Ford introduced an all-new design for its full-size model range. To further expand its flagship Galaxie 500 series, the 500 LTD was introduced. Sharing top billing within the Galaxie series with the performance 500XL, the 500 LTD was designed as a luxury-oriented vehicle, offering many features of more expensive vehicles under the lower price of the Ford nameplate. It featured a plush cloth interior with woodgrain accents, along with contoured seats and door panels not found on other full size Ford models. Options included power windows, power driver's seat, power brakes, power steering, air conditioning, and a full or half-vinyl top (called a Landau roof or Brougham interchangeably by various manufacturers). The Galaxie 500 LTD was offered in two body styles: a two-door hardtop and a four-door hardtop.

The launch of the LTD triggered responses from rivals, starting with a mid-year introduction by Chevrolet of its top of the line Caprice. AMC brought out the Ambassador DPL in 1966, Plymouth the Fury VIP, and Dodge the Monaco.

For 1966, the Galaxie name was dropped from the LTD. As with the Galaxie line, the LTD received a minor exterior revision, including a split grille. Front disc brakes became an option.

For 1967, the LTD underwent several changes, with a four-door pillared sedan joining the model range. To comply with federally-mandated safety regulations, the LTD received a padded steering wheel center hub, non-protruding instrument panel knobs, a dual-circuit brake master cylinder, four-way hazard flashers, and front outboard shoulder belt mounting points. While the roofline of the four-door hardtop saw minor styling revisions, the two-door hardtop saw extensive changes, giving it a formal profile. Twin Comfort Lounge front seats (a 50/50 split bench seat) became an option. In various forms, the configuration would be adopted by American automakers into the early 2000s. Lincoln-Mercury added the Marquis two-door hardtop as its comparable top of range model.

Serving largely as a preview of the upcoming major redesign, the 1968 LTD adopted several minor revisions of its own. For the first time, the LTD badge was added to the wood-trimmed Country Squire station wagon (as part of the distinct Ford station wagon series, it did not fully adopt the LTD name until 1969).

While the two-door hardtop saw slight changes to its roofline, four-door hardtops were restyled to more closely match their two-door counterparts, with the rear doors receiving more curves to their greenhouse. The vertically stacked headlamps introduced in 1965 were replaced by a hidden headlamps; shared with Lincoln-Mercury, the configuration would be a design feature denoting the top-trim LTD until 1971. The system was operated by engine vacuum, with the headlamp doors retracting upwards in the case of failure.

The model year also saw further changes to comply with safety regulations. Along with the addition of side marker lights and reflectors, the parking lights illuminated with the headlights; front outboard shoulder belts were fitted to cars built effective January 1, 1968. The padded steering wheel was replaced, following the addition of an energy-absorbing steering column.

First-generation Ford LTD (1965–1968)

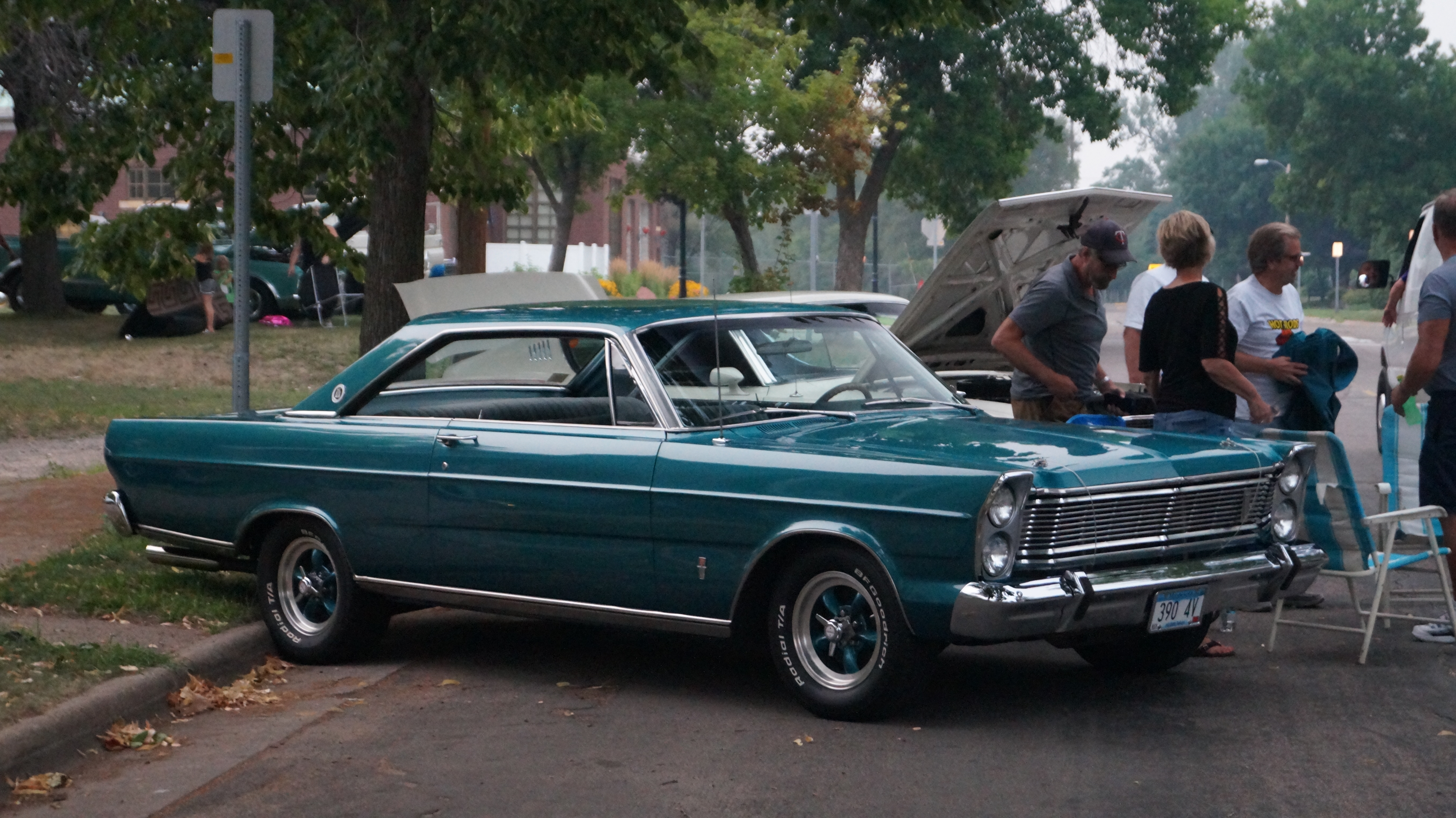
1965 Ford Galaxie 500 LTD 2-Door Hardtop

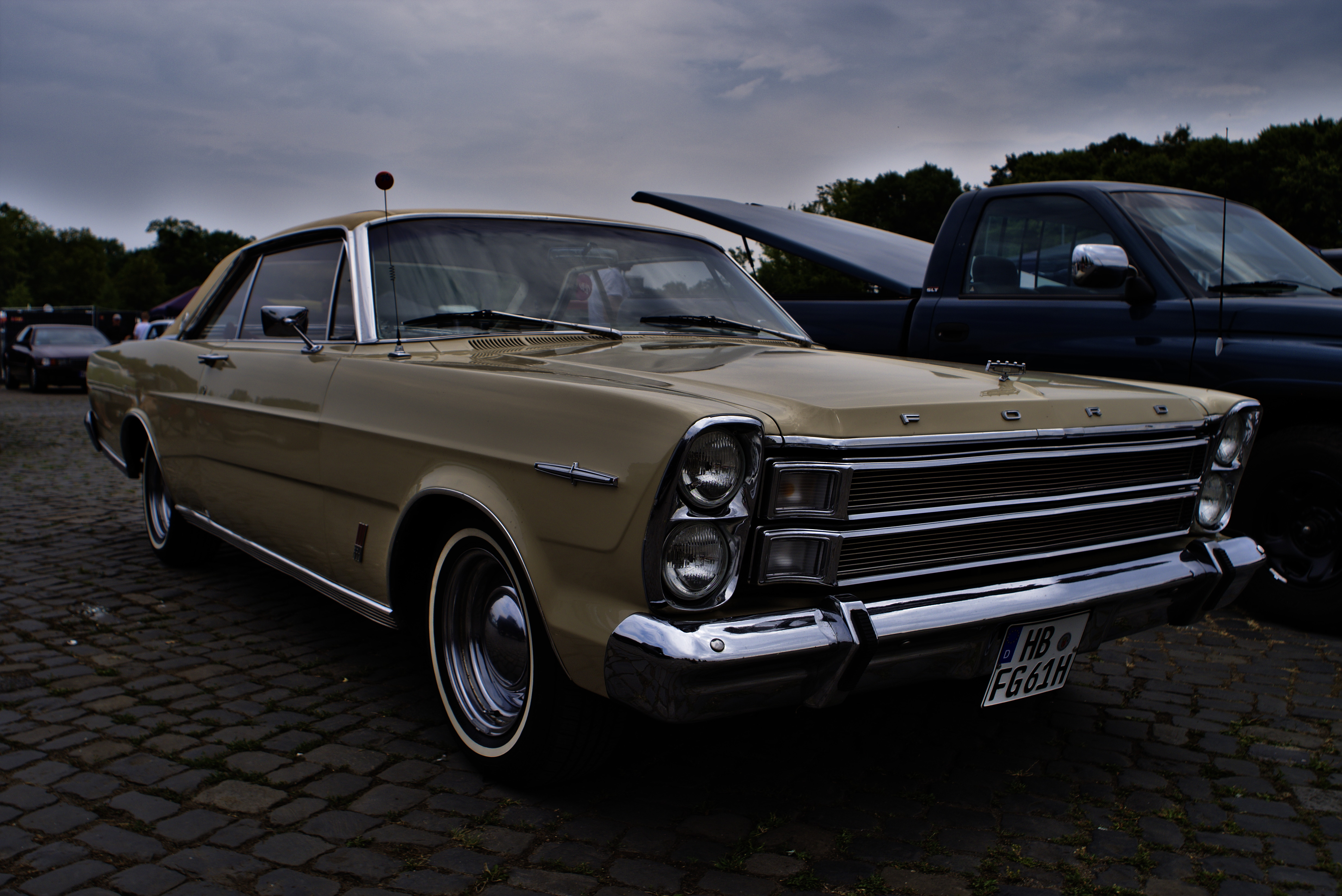
1966 Ford LTD 2-door Hardtop

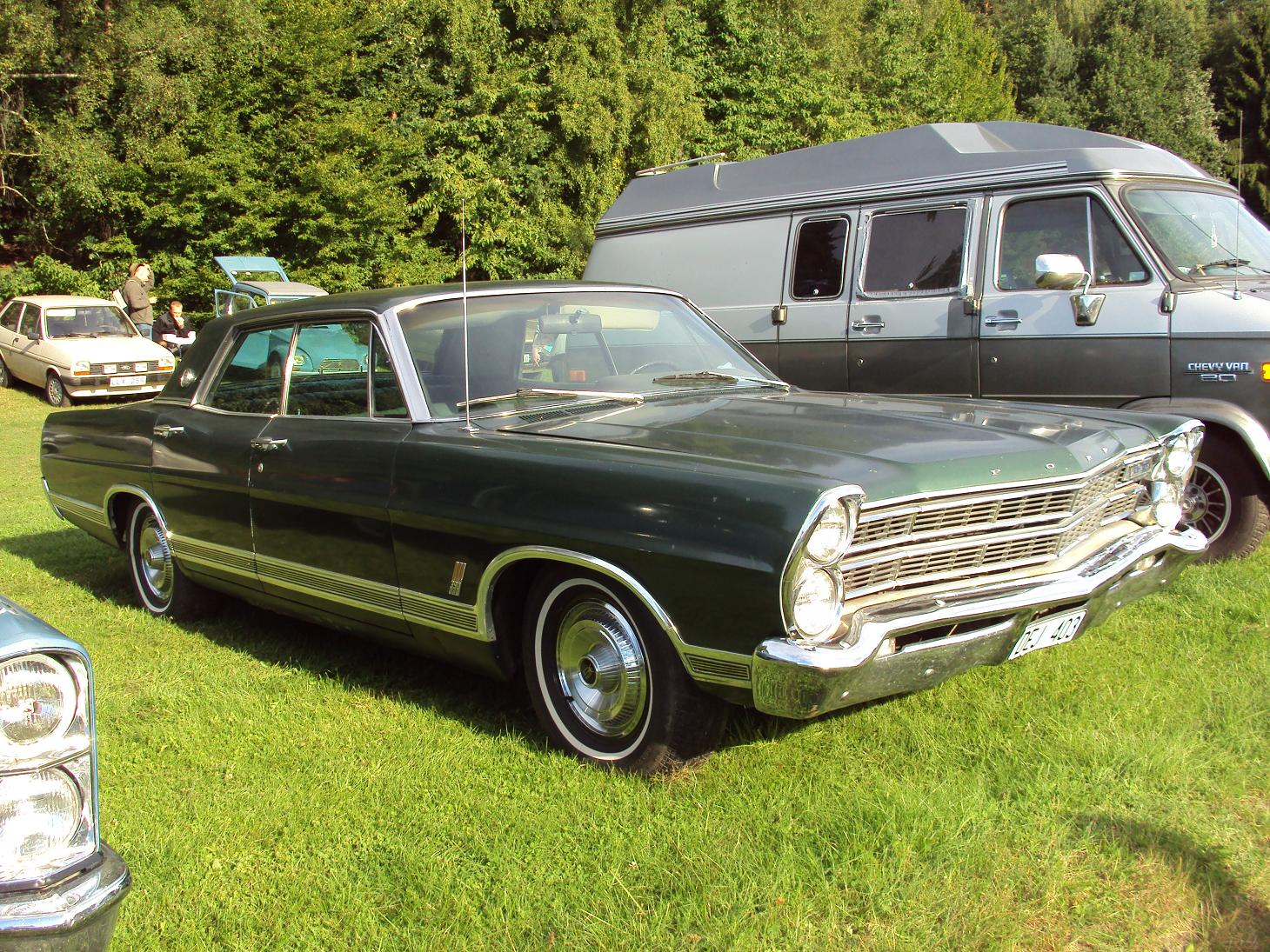
1967 Ford LTD four-door hardtop

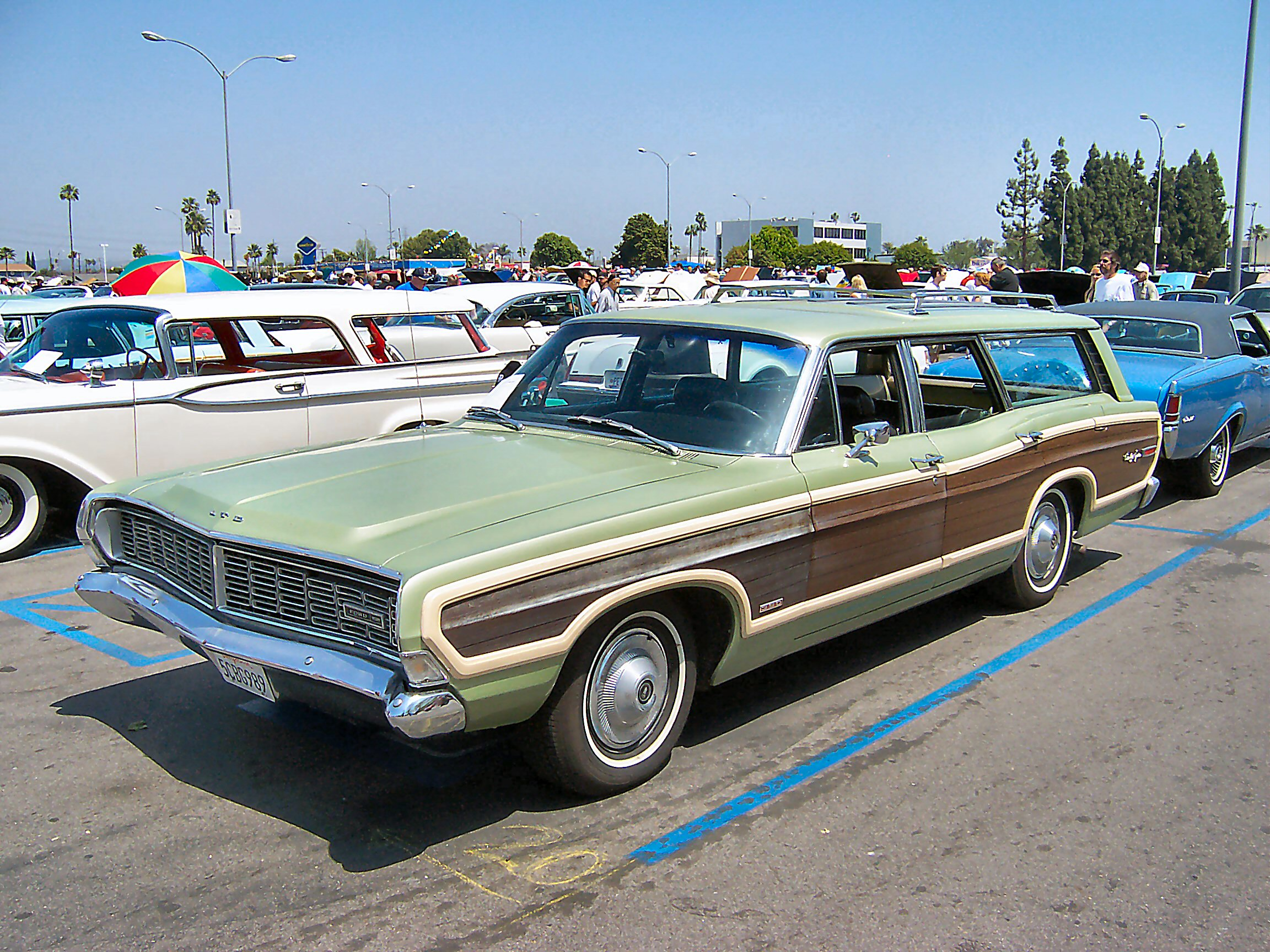
1968 Ford LTD Country Squire

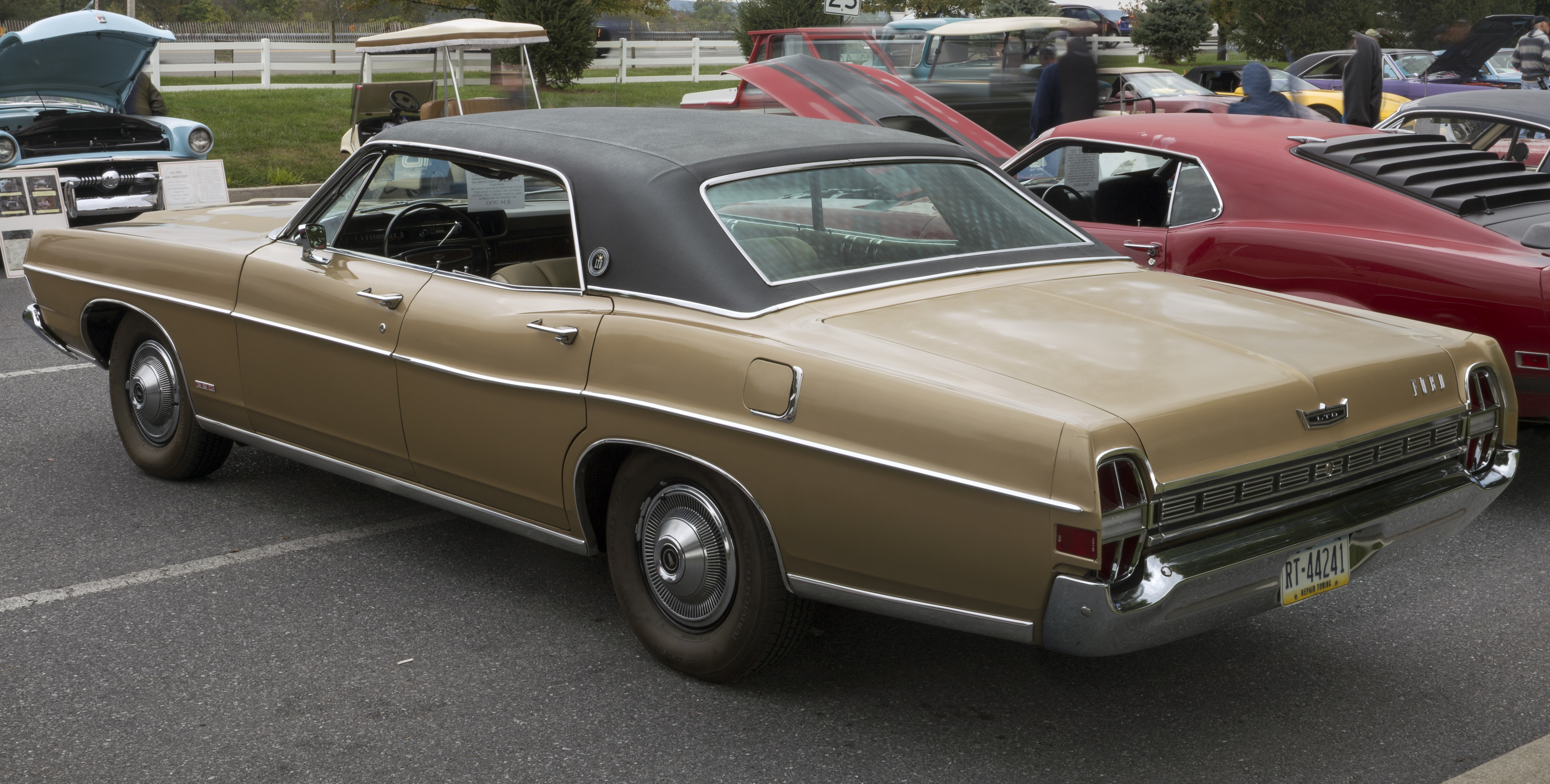
1968 Ford LTD 4-door hardtop rear

== Second generation (1969–1978) ==
Second generation
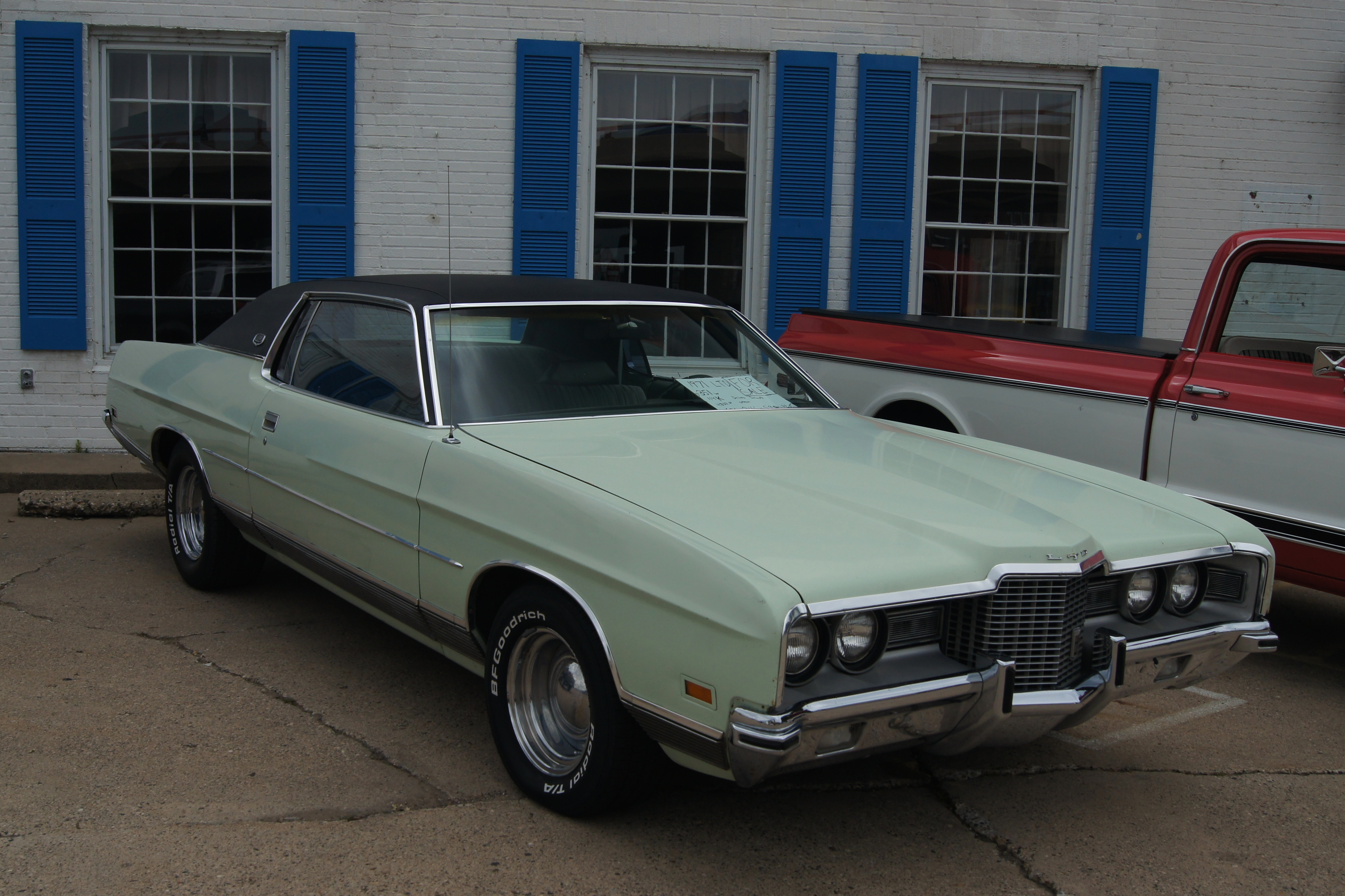
- 1971 Ford LTD Brougham 2-Door Hardtop

Overview
- Production: 1968–1978
- Model years: 1969–1978
- Assembly: United States: Hazelwood, Missouri (St. Louis Assembly Plant); St. Paul, Minnesota (Twin Cities Assembly Plant); Mahwah, New Jersey (Mahwah Assembly); Pico Rivera, California (Los Angeles Assembly); Hapeville, Georgia (Atlanta Assembly); Canada: Oakville, Canada (Oakville Assembly; Venezuela: Valencia, Carabobo (Valencia Assembly)

Body and chassis
- Body style: 4-door hardtop 4-door sedan 2-door coupe 2-door convertible (1971–1972); 4-door station wagon
- Related: Mercury Marquis; Mercury Monterey; Mercury Colony Park; Meteor LeMoyne; Meteor Montcalm; Meteor Rideau; Ford Galaxie; Ford Custom; Ford Country Squire

Powertrain
- Engine: 302 cu in (4.9 L) Windsor V8; 351 cu in (5.8 L) Cleveland V8; 351 cu in (5.8 L) 351M V8; 390 cu in (6.4 L) Thunderbird Special (FE) V8; 400 cu in (6.6 L) 335 V8; 429 cu in (7.0 L) 385 V8; 460 cu in (7.5 L) 385 V8
- Transmission: 3-speed Toploader manual 4-speed Toploader manual 3-speed FMX automatic 3-speed C6 automatic 3-speed C4 automatic

Dimensions
- Wheelbase: 121.0 inches (3,070 mm)
- Length: 224.1 inches (5,690 mm) (coupe, sedan); 225.7 inches (5,730 mm) (wagon)

The LTD was given a major redesign for the 1969 model year. It shared a largely carryover chassis with all full-size Ford sedans, with the wheelbase lengthened by two inches.

=== Timeline ===
1969: Ford LTD is given a redesign. The hidden headlights and formal roofline introduced in 1967 are retained. An all-new body features a split grille with a horizontal center divider (shared with XLs and Country Squires).

- 1970: The split grille was discontinued, replaced by a three-segment grille with a prominent center section, a modified version of the 1970 Ford Thunderbird and Continental Mark III. All LTDs got a new federally-mandated locking steering column and wheel, with the ignition switch located on the right side of the column. For model year 1970 the LTD received a LTD Brougham luxury trim package, which came with optional equipment on other LTD models as standard, and was offered on the four-door sedan, four-door hardtop, and two-door hardtop; all received a padded black vinyl roof.
- 1971: The LTD was given a styling update. In the rear, the long-running Ford look of twin round or square "jet exhaust" taillights was replaced by horizontal taillights on all full-size Fords. In between was a center "third" brakelight, rather than the alloy trim panel on the Galaxie 500 or body-color trim of the Custom 500s. In front, the LTD lost its hidden headlamps, but got a new front end treatment with a tall center grille section and "LTD" spelled out in block letters on the hood. With the discontinuation of the XL series, the convertible was moved to the LTD line. These were produced with bucket seats and center consoles; the console was similar to the console in the XLs and Mercury Marauders of 1969–1970, with a "stirrup" style shift handle.
- 1972: There was little change. The front bumper now stretched across the lower section of the grille. A new rear bumper integrated the taillights; also in the rear, the design of the trunk lid was squared off. Due to decreased demand in the segment, 1972 was the final model year for the LTD convertible.
- 1973: The LTD was given a major redesign for the model year in order to comply with federal regulations. The requirements for 5-mph front bumpers had taken effect, with larger rear bumpers to follow in 1974. While the redesign slightly decreased the weight of the LTD, it still was far in excess of two tons, making agility and fuel economy both key weak points. The new styling was bulkier, making the car look significantly larger and heavier than previous models. Four-door models (which shared rooflines with Mercury) were given thin B-pillars for roof reinforcement and branded as "pillared hardtops" (but retained the frameless door glass of all LTD models).
- 1974: Mostly carryover from the 1973 model year. Five-mph bumpers were added to the rear. The 460 engine became an option for the first time. Mid-year, a non-woodgrain LTD wagon became available. A new Federal law required seat belts to be buckled before the starter would operate; public protests prompted the government to relax this requirement. Subsequent models got a simple "Fasten Seat Belt" warning light and buzzer for 1975, and owners were now permitted to disable the starter interlock on their 1974s.
- 1975: Following the discontinuation of the Galaxie series after 1974, Ford sought to fill its place by expanding the LTD trim lineup. Above the Custom 500 was the standard LTD, the LTD Brougham, and newly introduced for 1975, the LTD Landau. In an effort to comply with pending rollover standards (as well as to differentiate it from the Mercury Marquis), the two-door was converted from a hardtop to a coupe with wide B-pillars and a tall, narrow "opera window" (Chevrolet did the same thing with the 1974 Caprice Coupe). More or less the Ford counterpart to the Mercury Grand Marquis, the LTD Landau featured rear fender skirts and various decor packages for additional luxury; it was distinguished by the return of hidden headlamps (exclusive to its trim level). Hidden headlamps were also shared with the LTD Country Squire wagon. The 429 engine was replaced by the 460 V8 sourced from Lincoln-Mercury for 1975. A catalytic converter now required the use of unleaded fuel, and the gas gauge and fuel filler sported warnings to this effect.
- 1976: Four-wheel disc brakes and 8-track were optional. Last year for LTD Brougham trim level.
- 1977: Since the LTD Brougham had been discontinued, the LTD Landau received the former Brougham interior as the base offering. Optional interiors, including the LTD Landau Luxury Group, were still available.
- 1978: Final year for 121-inch wheelbase LTD, as it is replaced by the downsized Panther-platform generation LTD for 1979.

1973–1978 Ford LTD Police Package & Police Interceptor Package: 1973–1978, Police Package contained a 351/400 CID motor for city patrol cars, while the 460 Police Interceptor was for heavy Duty and high Speed use. The 460 Police Interceptor motor was rated at 260 Net horsepower and capable of 0-60 times in the 8 second range. Quarter mile times in the upper 15 second bracket, and top speeds in excess of 135 Mph. 1975-1978 Ford LTD 460 Police Interceptor "C code"

Approximately 7,850,000 full-size Fords and Mercurys were sold over the 1969–1978 period. This makes it the second best selling Ford automobile platform after the Ford Model T.

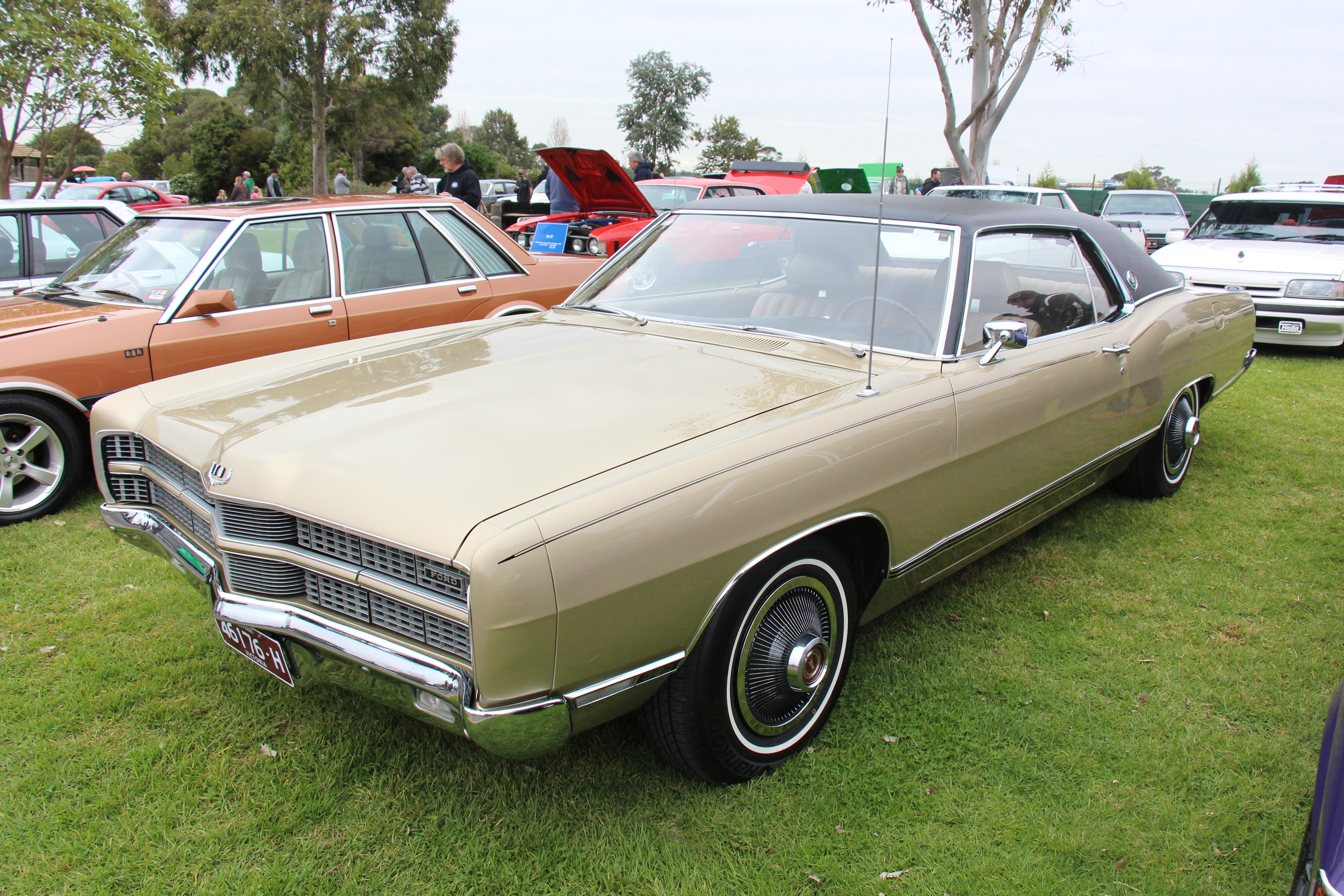
1969 Ford LTD 2-door hardtop

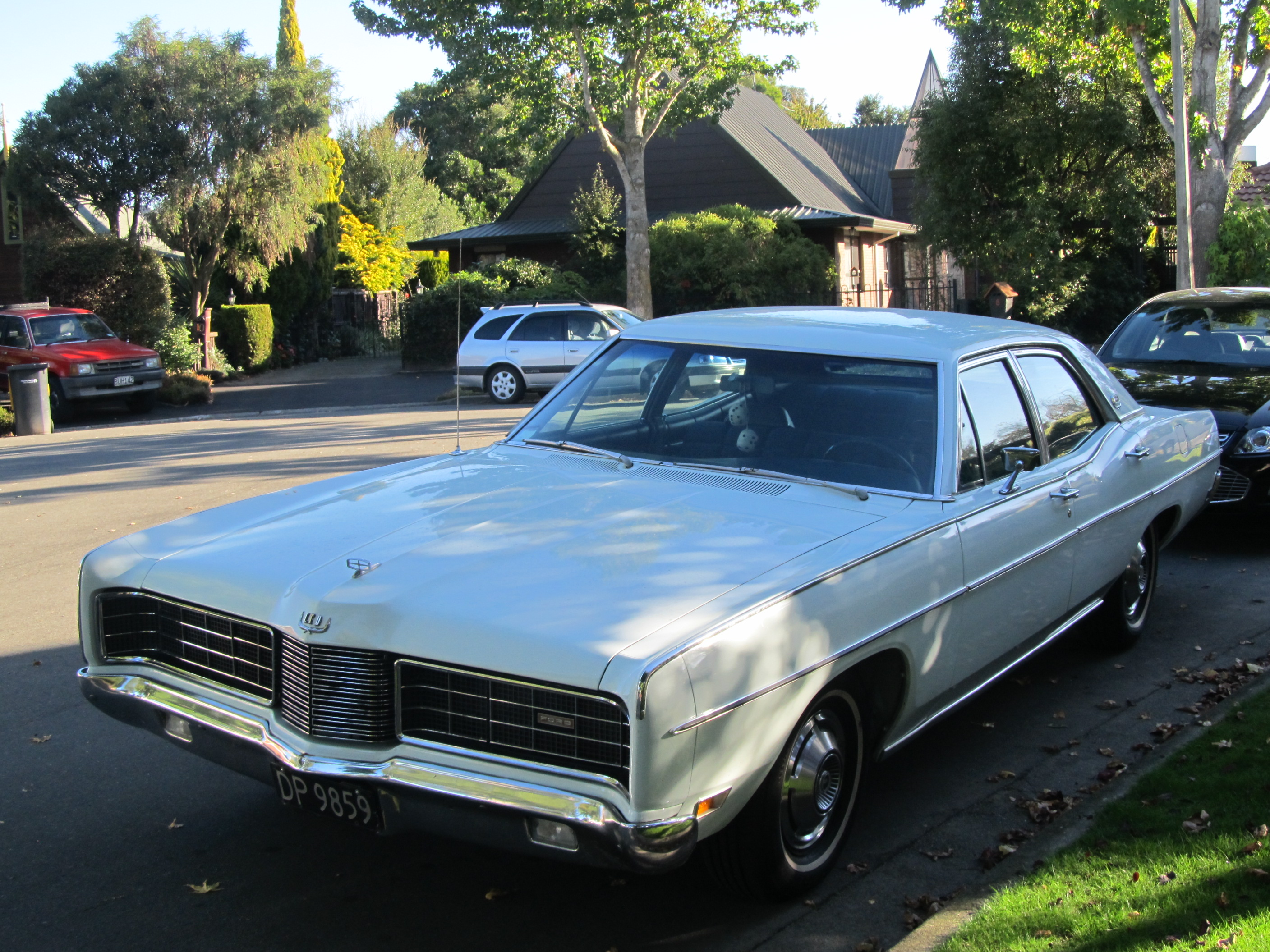
1970 Ford LTD 4-Door Sedan

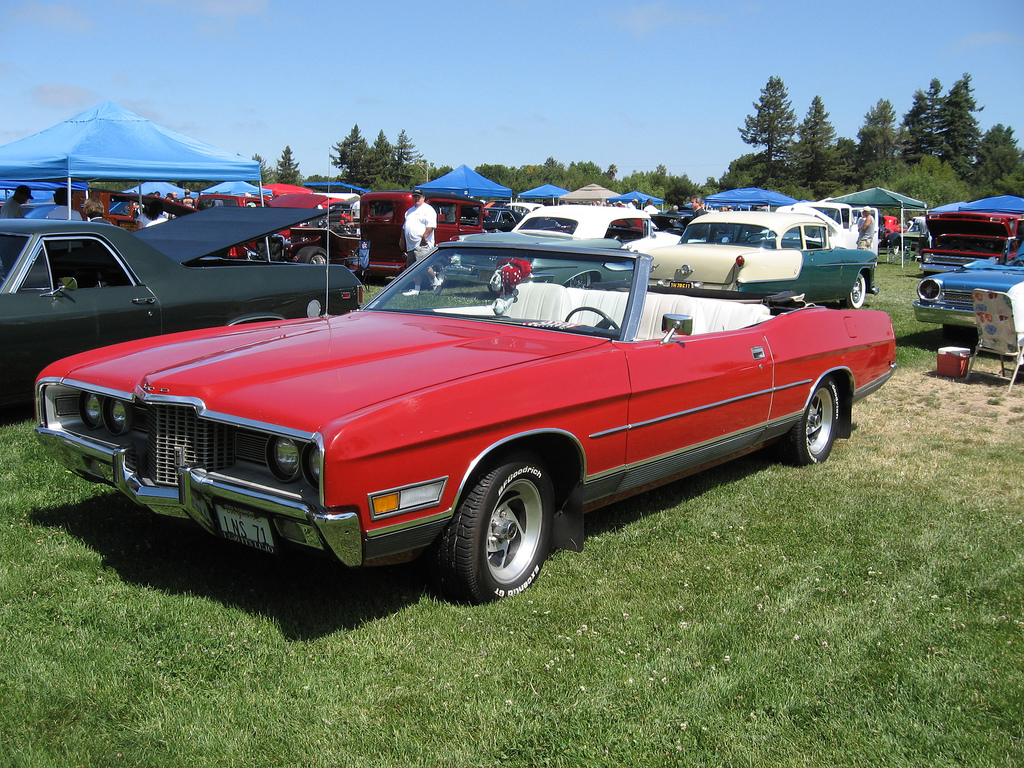
1971 Ford LTD convertible

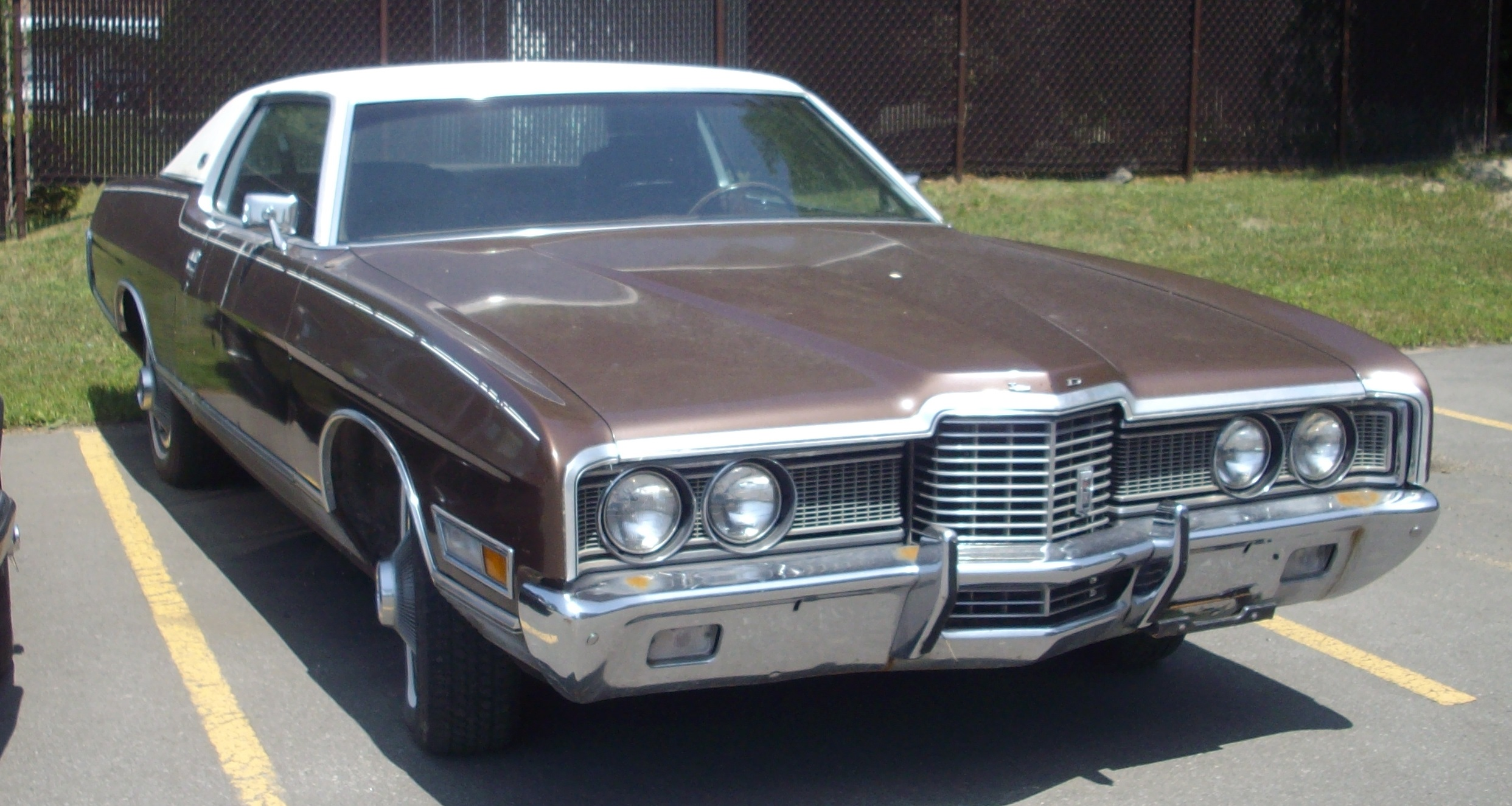
1972 Ford LTD 2-Door Hardtop

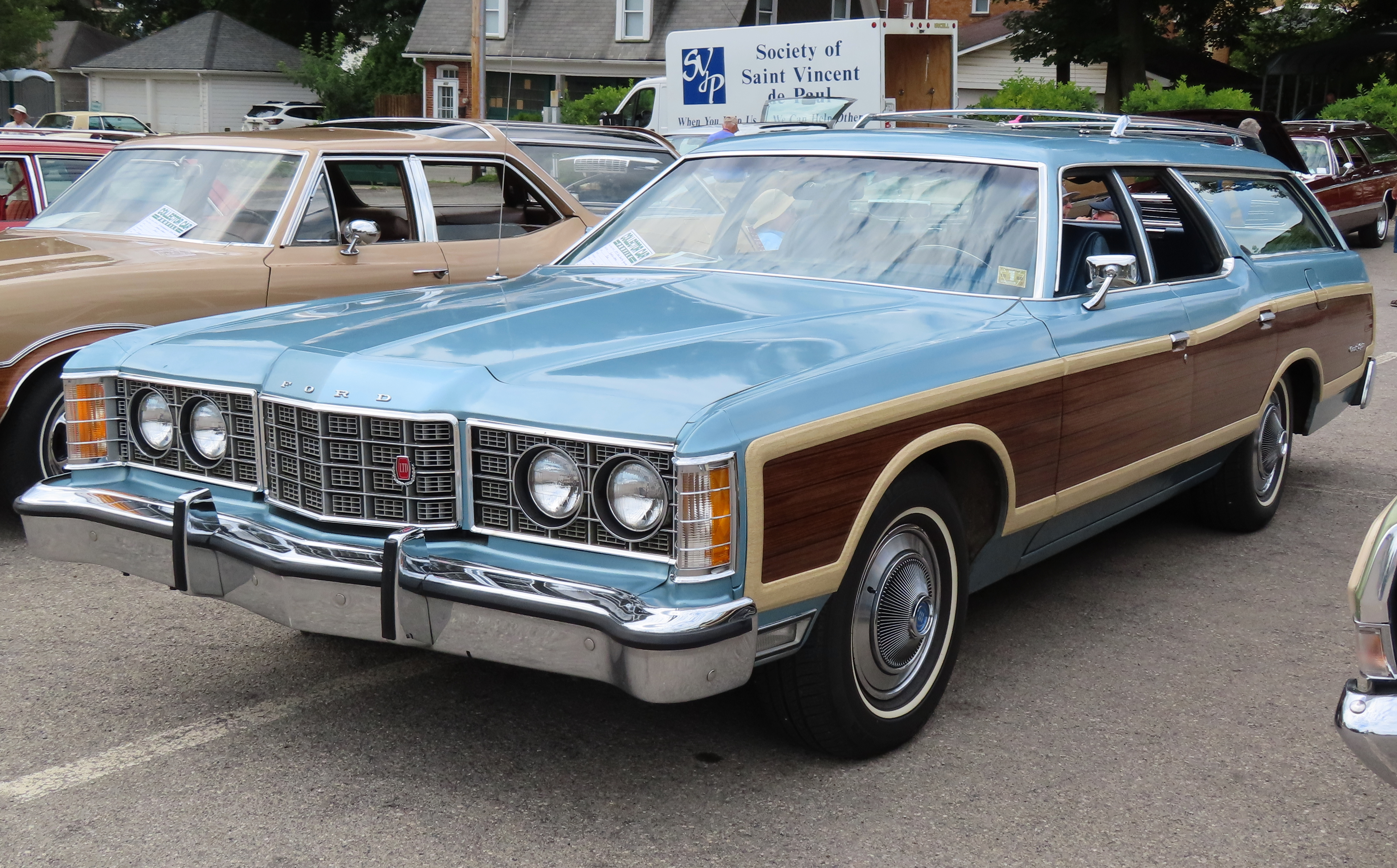
1973 Ford LTD Country Squire

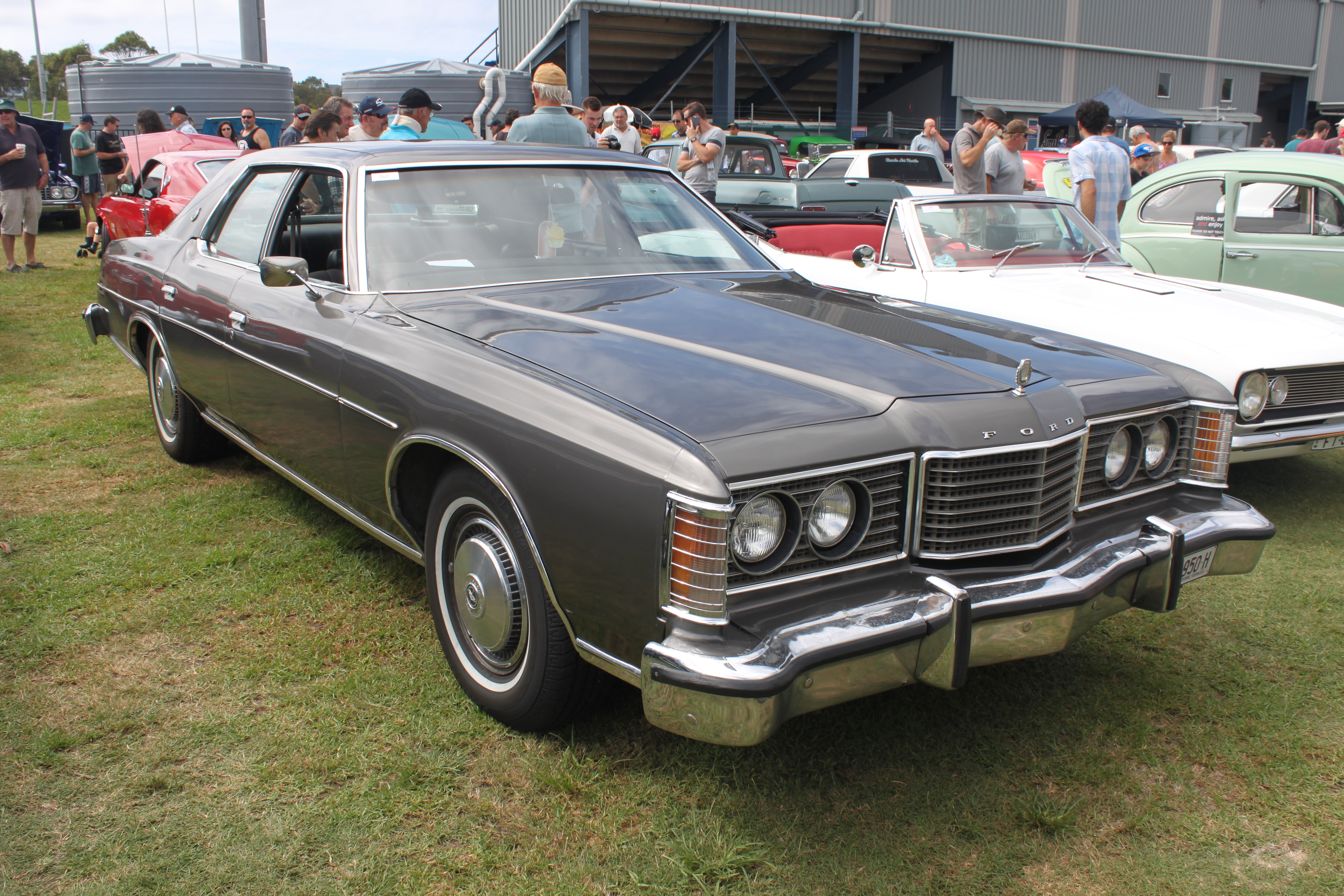
1974 Ford LTD 4-door pillared hardtop

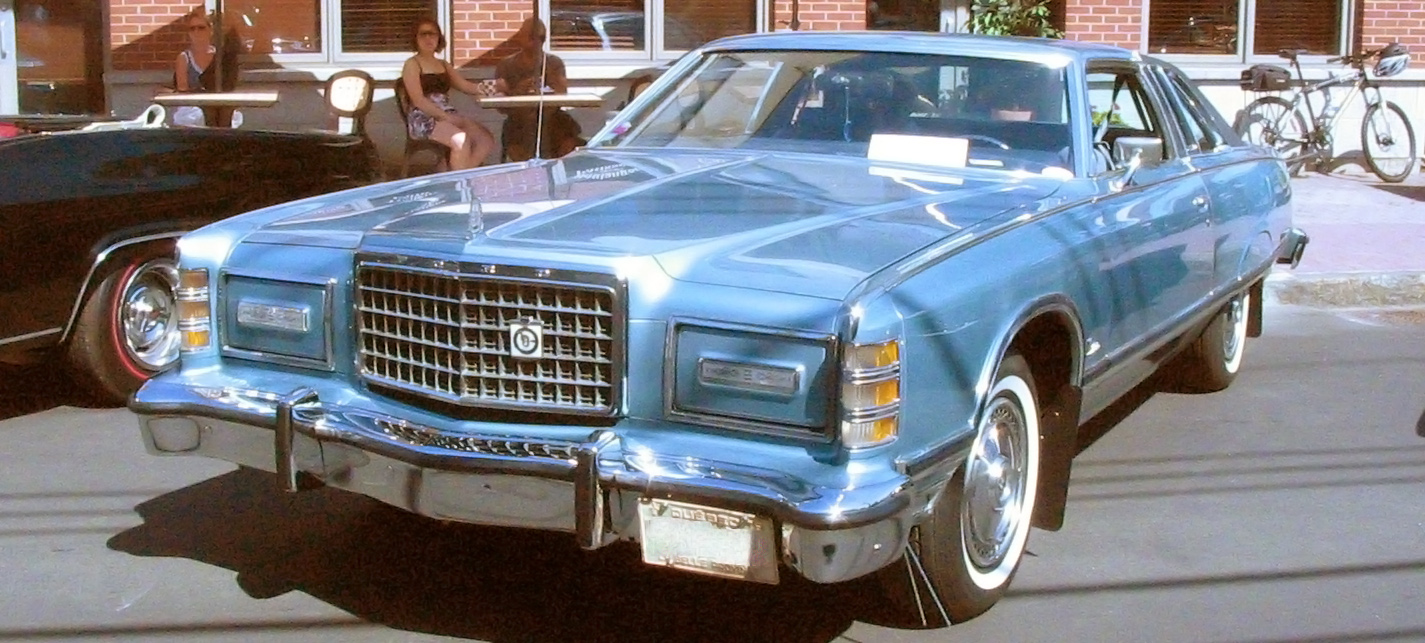
1975 Ford LTD Landau 2-door pillared hardtop

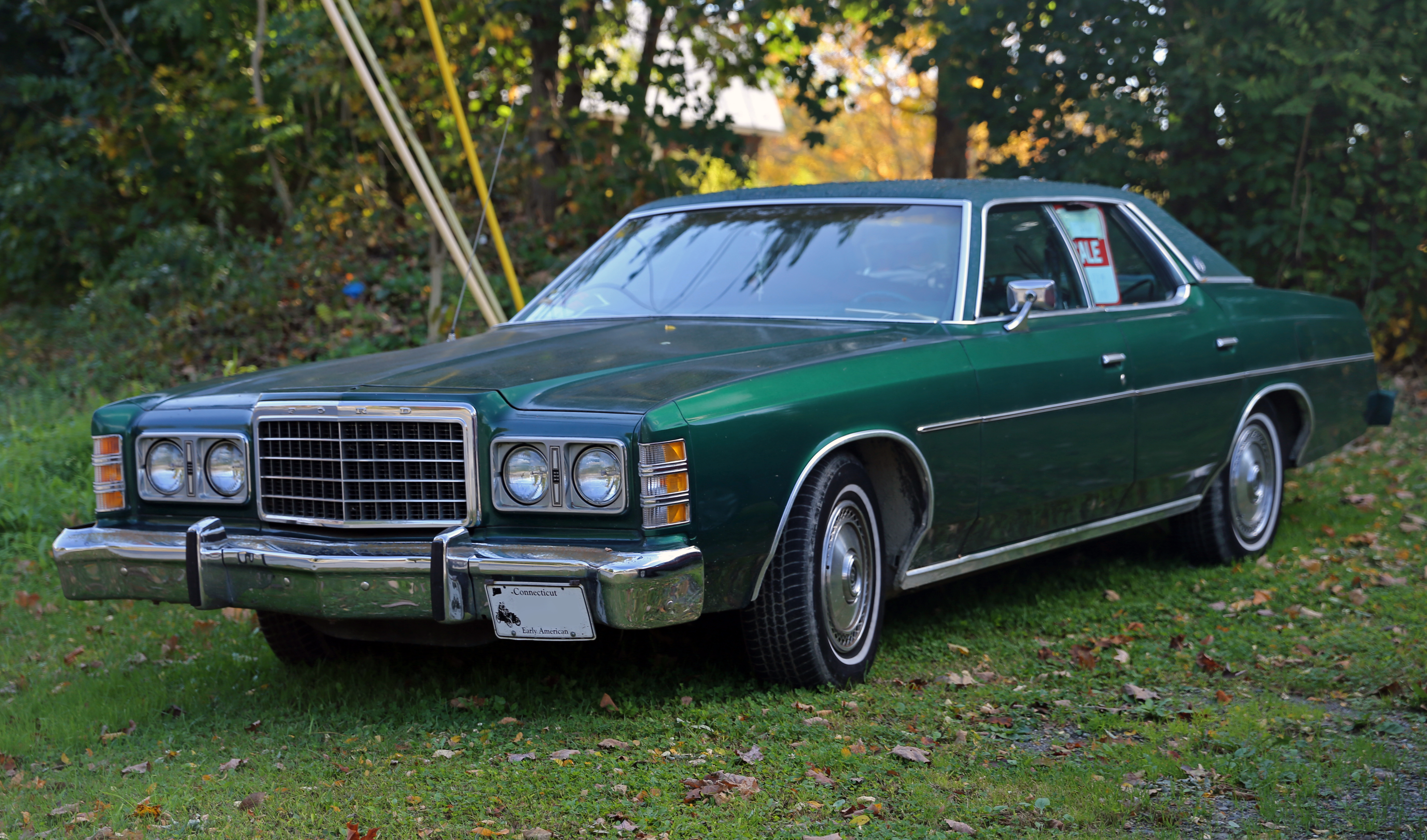
1977 Ford LTD 4-door pillared hardtop

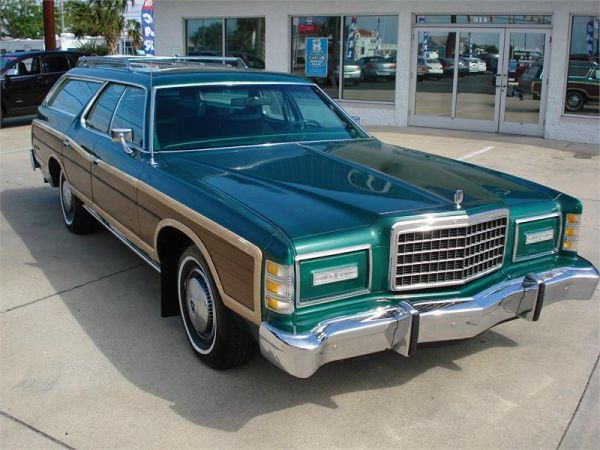
1978 Ford LTD Country Squire

=== Mechanical details ===
For the first time since the 1940s, the full-size Ford line was powered exclusively by V8 engines. The base engine was the 302 cid V8. The next largest engine was Ford's 351 CID V8, the most common choice. Still larger was Ford's 400 CID V8. Topping the range was the 429 cid V8, which was replaced by the 460 CID V8 for 1974. The full-sized Fords remained strong sellers each year during this period, due to their high comfort, sound engines, good build quality and reasonable cost.

=== LTD II ===
When Ford updated its mid-size product line for 1977, they took on the LTD name as well. To differentiate them from the full-size product lineup, the mid-size cars were called the LTD II in an attempt to appeal to buyers as a downsized alternative to the full-sized LTD which had competition from GM's newly downsized full-sized cars. The LTD II was based on the Ford Torino and served as a restyled replacement for it. The LTD II styling was also adapted to update the final generation of the Ford Ranchero. The LTD II was discontinued after 1979 without being replaced, as the new Panther-platform LTD was nearly a foot shorter than an LTD II and the Granada became Ford's mid-size product line with its 1981 redesign.

== Third generation (1979–1982) ==
Third generation (Panther)
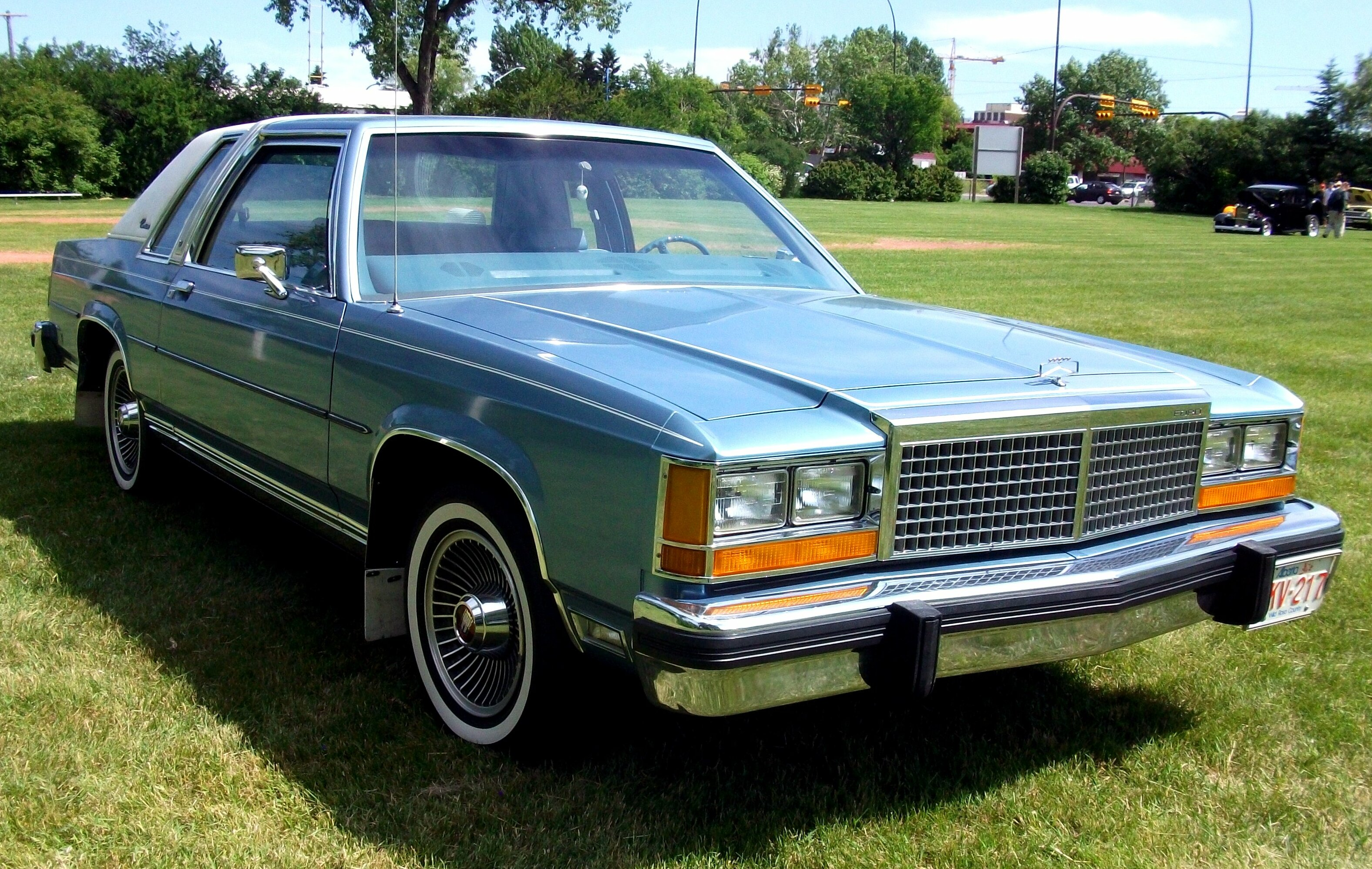
- 1981 Ford LTD Crown Victoria two-door sedan

Overview
- Also called: Ford Custom 500 (Canada)
- Production: 1978–1982
- Model years: 1979–1982
- Assembly: United States: Hapeville, GA (Atlanta Assembly); Louisville, KY (Louisville Assembly); Oakville, Ontario (Oakville Assembly); Pico Rivera, California (Los Angeles Assembly); Venezuela: Valencia, Carabobo (Valencia Assembly)

Body and chassis
- Body style: 2-door sedan 4-door sedan 5-door station wagon
- Platform: Ford Panther platform
- Related: Ford Country Squire; Ford LTD Crown Victoria; Mercury Marquis; Mercury Grand Marquis; Mercury Colony Park

Powertrain
- Engine: 255 cu in (4.2 L) Windsor V8; 302 cu in (4.9 L) 5.0 Windsor V8; 351 cu in (5.8 L) Windsor V8

Dimensions
- Length: 209 inches (5,300 mm) (sedans); 214.7 inches (5,450 mm) (wagon)

Chronology
- Successor: Ford LTD Crown Victoria

=== Background ===
For the 1977 model year, General Motors became the first American auto manufacturer to introduce downsized full-size sedans, with its B-body and C-body full-size sedans adopting a smaller exterior footprint than their A-body intermediates. With its own downsized full-size product lines remaining two years away, Ford responded by introducing the "Trim Size" Ford LTD II, a substantial exterior revision of the Torino/Gran Torino, nearly matching the Chevrolet Caprice in its exterior dimensions. To appeal to buyers skeptical of downsized full-size cars, Ford advertisements compared the 1977 LTD compared its dimensions side by-side with the GM Cadillac Fleetwood Brougham flagship sedan.

The third-generation 1979 Ford LTD began production on July 31, 1978 at Louisville Assembly, with Atlanta Assembly, Los Angeles Assembly, and Oakville Assembly coming online during August. The LTD was offered as two-door and four-door pillared sedans (replacing the previous 4-door pillared hardtop) with a 5-door station wagon (with the wood-paneled Country Squire returning). In the United States, the Custom 500 was discontinued entirely, with the nameplate offered as the base-trim model in Canada through the 1981 model year. Lincoln introduced its downsized Continental for 1980, becoming the final brand to introduce downsized full-size cars.

Alongside the Mercury Marquis, the LTD marked the launch of the rear-wheel drive Ford Panther platform. In line with the GM downsizing, the Panther platform introduced trimmer body profiles, better handling (from lower curb weight), and better fuel economy (to comply with the introduction of CAFE standards). In contrast to the Chrysler R platform (a rebody of chassis underpinnings dating to 1962), the Panther chassis was a completely new design.

=== Model overview ===
In comparison to its 1978 predecessor, the 1979 LTD shed approximately 15 inches of body length and 7 inches of wheelbase; (dependent on powertrain) the Panther chassis shed over 700 pounds in curb weight. While slightly narrower overall, the smaller body led to increased interior and trunk space.

The powertrain lineup saw several changes; while the 302 V8 was again standard with a 351 optional (with Ford now advertising metric 5.0 L and 5.8 L displacements), the lighter chassis negated the need for the big-block 6.6 L and 7.5 L V8 options. For 1981, a 4.2 L variant of the 5.0 L V8 was made standard (intended to further improve CAFE fuel economy), with the larger V8s remaining as a options. However, the 4.2 L V8 was rated for only 115 hp (the lowest since the 1953 Flathead 239 V8). In contrast to Chrysler and General Motors, Panther-chassis vehicles retained V8 engines as standard equipment, forgoing diesel engines or V6/I6 engines.

Adopting the sharp-edged styling of the (smaller) Ford Fairmont, the 1979 LTD shed its optional hidden headlamps; all versions adopted exposed rectangular headlamps besides a much wider grille. Base-trim examples were fitted with dual headlamps and clear parking lamp lenses; higher-trim versions used quad headlamps with amber lenses. 1979 was the only year the standard LTD was fitted with a hood ornament.

For 1980, trim levels were revised, with the base trim becoming the LTD S (intended for fleet sales, effectively replacing the Custom 500), the standard LTD as the mid-range trim, and the flagship LTD Landau renamed as the LTD Crown Victoria. The Ford equivalent of the Mercury Grand Marquis, the LTD Crown Victoria drew its name from a brushed aluminum band covering the B-pillar and the roof (influenced by its 1950s Ford Fairlane namesake). The Lincoln-style hood ornament of 1979 was replaced by a horizontal design used through 1987 (used only on LTD Crown Victoria trims). The 5.0 L V8 received an optional 4-speed overdrive automatic transmission (exclusive to the Panther chassis at the time).

For 1981, alongside the addition of the 4.2-liter V8, the body underwent minor revisions to improve fuel economy. The vents in the front bumpers were removed (shifting the license plate mount under the left headlamp) and the sideview mirrors were repositioned (leading to the return of vent windows as an option). In another change, the 5.0 L V8 received optional throttle-body fuel injection (introduced in 1980 for Lincoln).

For 1982, the LTD saw the addition of the Ford Blue Oval emblem on the grille and trunklid (replacing "FORD" badging). To aid in tracking fuel consumption, a trip computer was added as an option. The standard-equipment 4.2 L V8 was in its final year, with Ford dropping the 5.8 L V8 from retail sale (now sold exclusively with police cars). Alongside the Motorcraft 7200VV two-barrel variable venturi carburetor; Ford introduced a conventional carburetor for the 5.8 L HO V8 (for police cars). For all three engines, the 4-speed AOD overdrive transmission was now standard.

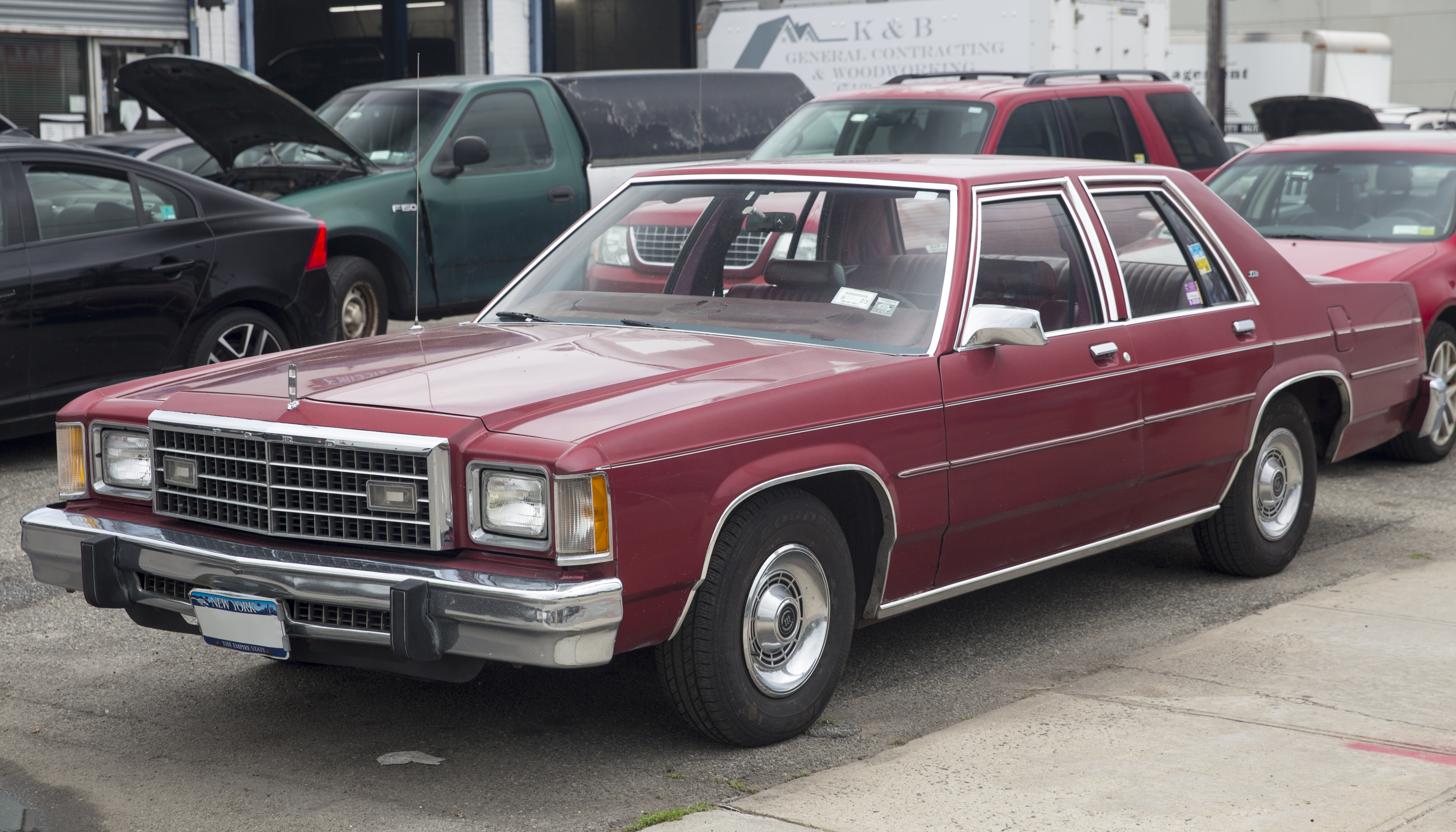
1979 Ford LTD sedan; standard trim with two headlamps.

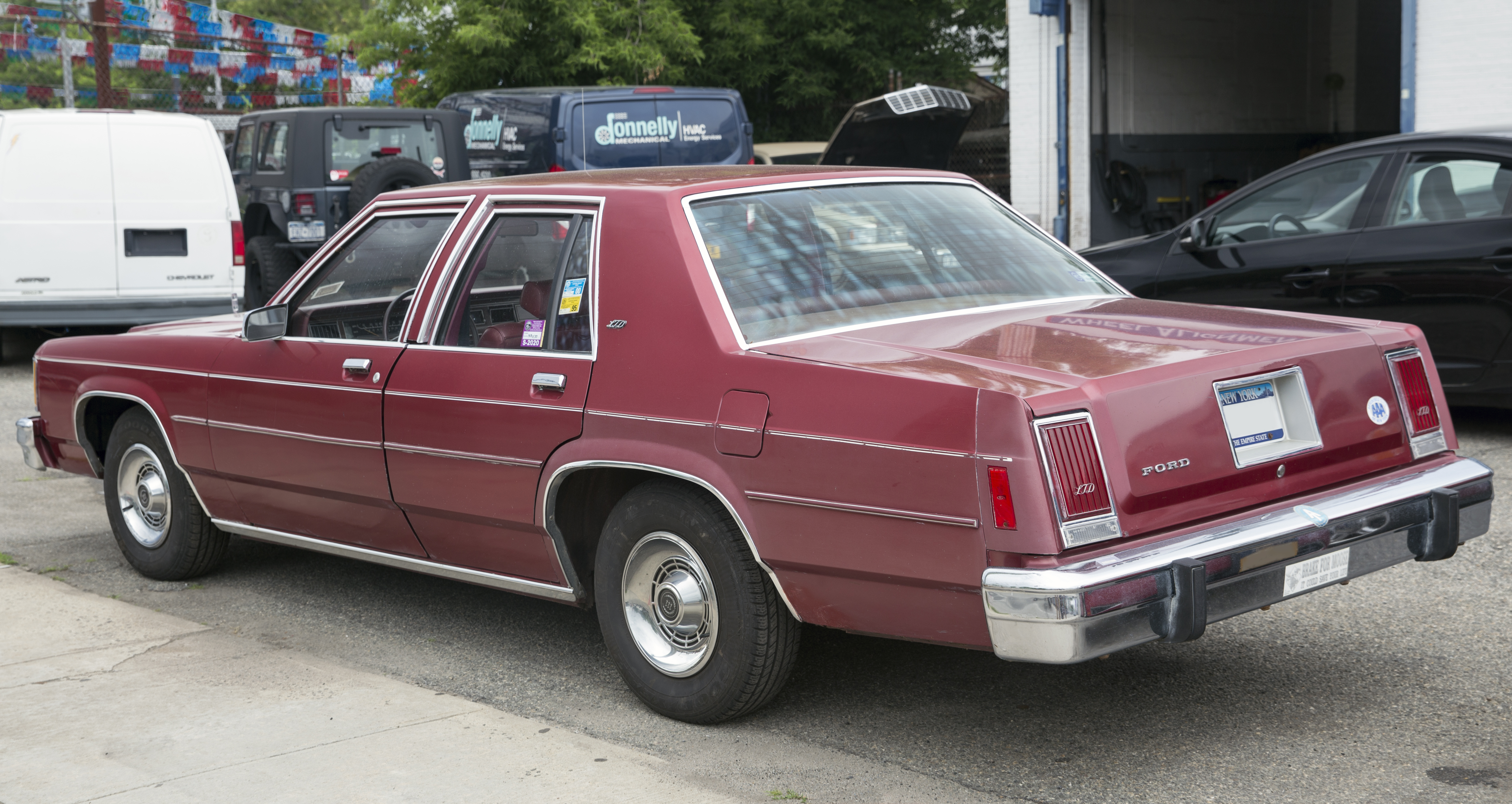

Production Figures:

Ford LTD Production Figures
	Coupe	Sedan	Wagon	Yearly Total
1979	96,319	192,329	67,887	356,535
1980	23,611	92,875	25,076	141,562
1981	17,340	92,561	22,462	132,363
1982	12,797	93,363	21,893	128,053
Total	150,067	471,128	137,318	758,513

== Fourth generation (1983–1986) ==
Fourth generation (Fox)
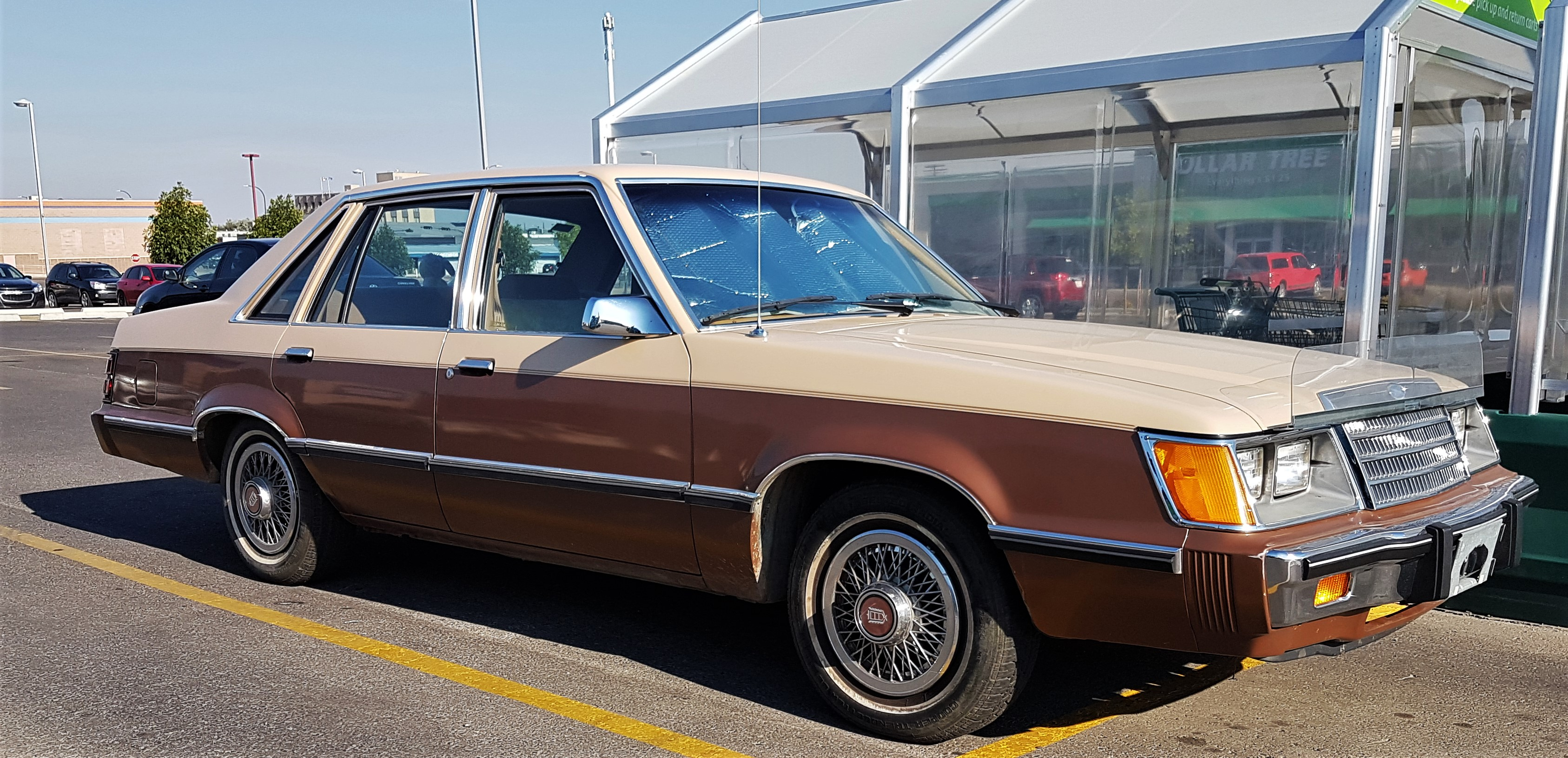
- 1983–1984 Ford LTD sedan

Overview
- Also called: Mercury Marquis; Ford Granada (Venezuela); Ford Cougar (Venezuela)
- Production: 1982–1986
- Model years: 1983–1986
- Assembly: United States: Chicago, IL (Chicago Assembly); Atlanta, GA (Atlanta Assembly); Venezuela: Valencia, Carabobo (Valencia Assembly)

Body and chassis
- Body style: 4-door sedan 5-door station wagon
- Platform: Ford Fox platform
- Related: Ford Fairmont; Ford Granada; Ford Thunderbird; Mercury Cougar; Mercury Zephyr; Lincoln Continental

Powertrain
- Engine: 2.3 L Lima I4; 3.3 L Thriftpower Six I6; 3.8 L Essex V6; 4.9L 5.0L Windsor V8
- Transmission: 4-speed manual 3-speed C5 automatic 4-speed AOD automatic

Dimensions
- Wheelbase: 105.6 in (2,682 mm)
- Length: 196.5 in (4,991 mm)
- Width: 71.0 in (1,803 mm)
- Height: 53.8 in (1,367 mm) (sedan); 54.4 in (1,382 mm) (wagon)
- Curb weight: 3,001 lb (1,361 kg) (sedan); 3,108 lb (1,410 kg) (wagon)

Chronology
- Predecessor: Ford Granada (1981–1982)
- Successor: Ford Taurus

From 1981 to 1983, Ford underwent a major revision of its full-size and mid-size product lines, involving all three of its divisions. For the 1983 model year, the LTD and LTD Crown Victoria split into distinct product lines. The latter became the full-size Ford sedan range (alongside the LTD Country Squire), with the LTD nameplate effectively replacing the Ford Granada (equivalent to Mercury Cougar non-XR7 model) in a mid-cycle model revision. In line with Ford, the Mercury Marquis and Grand Marquis were also split into distinct product lines; replacing the Cougar (sedan and wagon), the Marquis became the counterpart of the repackaged LTD. The more aerodynamic design had a slanted nose and a large greenhouse; drag resistance was down to Cd=0.38.

Shedding nearly 13 inches of length, 9 inches of wheelbase, 7 inches of width, and over 600 pounds of curb weight (dependent on powertrain), the 1983 LTD underwent nearly the same reduction in size as its 1979 predecessor, although this downsizing came as the result of re-marketing a stronger-selling nameplate for a slow-selling model line. Ultimately, the LTD became the third-best selling automobile in the US for 1983 and 1984.

The chassis was also overhauled and now featured nitrogen-charged shocks and struts and larger wheels. The buyer received a standard split-bench front seats, while fabric coverings replaced much of the vinyl from the Granada. Ford recycled the use of the 1980–1982 Thunderbird instrument panel for the new LTD including the optional digital instrumentation. Ford's "Tripminder" trip computer was a novel option, allowing the driver to monitor fuel consumption, average speed, and various other functions.

=== Model overview ===
Sharing the mid-size version of the Fox platform with its Granada predecessor, the fourth-generation LTD has a 105.6-inch wheelbase. In contrast to both the Granada and the full-size LTD, the fourth-generation LTD was sold as a four-door sedan and a five-door station wagon (no two-door versions were offered). Alongside the base-trim sedan and wagon (the only versions available for the first model year), the LTD Brougham trim made its return, along with a LTD Squire wood-trimmed wagon.

For its 1983 launch, the LTD retained two engines from the Granada: a 2.3-liter Lima inline-four (not available as a wagon) and a 3.3-liter Falcon Six inline-six. Also inherited from the Granada was a 3.8-liter Essex V6 with 112 hp (84 kW), which replaced the inline-six entirely for 1984. For 1984, both engines gained central point fuel injection in the United States (the Canadian-market V6 remained carbureted until 1986). A rare option, seen only in 1982–1984, was an LPG (propane)-powered version of the four-cylinder engine; it was largely discontinued due to poor sales and lack of propane fueling infrastructure. The four-cylinder was a slow seller throughout; Ford kept offering it for the duration of production but in 1986 only 485 four-cylinder LTDs were sold, representing 0.7 percent of overall LTD/Squire sales for the year.

For the first time since 1971, the LTD was offered with a manual transmission; a three-speed automatic was optional on the 2.3 and standard on the 3.3-liter engine. The larger 3.8 was only offered with the overdrive four-speed automatic.

For the 1985 model year, the LTD underwent a minor model revision. Along with minor changes to the taillamps, the LTD received a new grille, distinguished by a centered Ford Blue Oval emblem. 1986 models are identifiable by the addition of a federally-mandated CHMSL (center brake lamp).

Fourth generation Ford LTD (Fox platform)

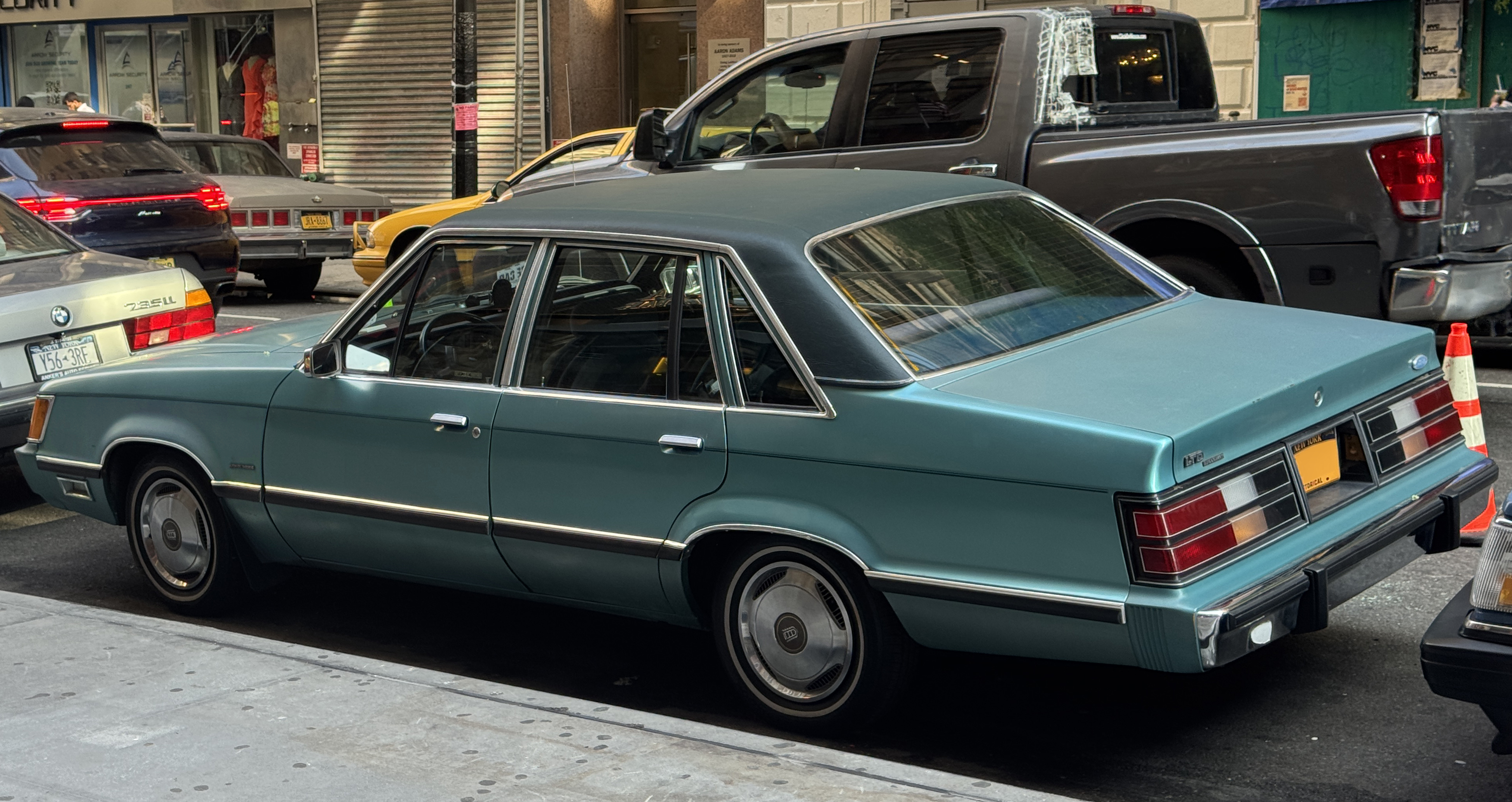
1983 Ford LTD Brougham sedan; rear view

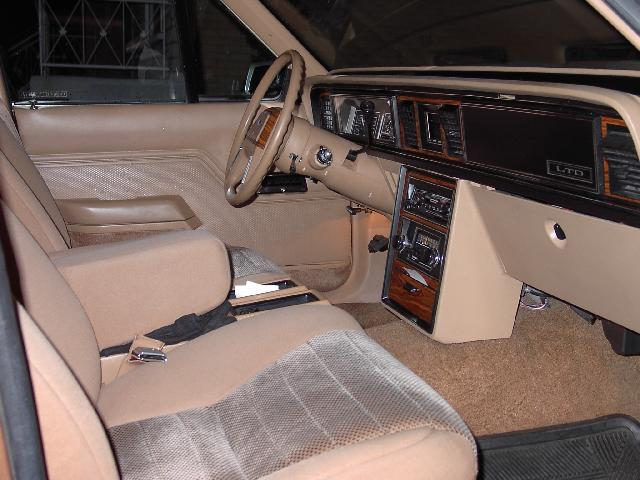
interior image, 1984 Ford LTD

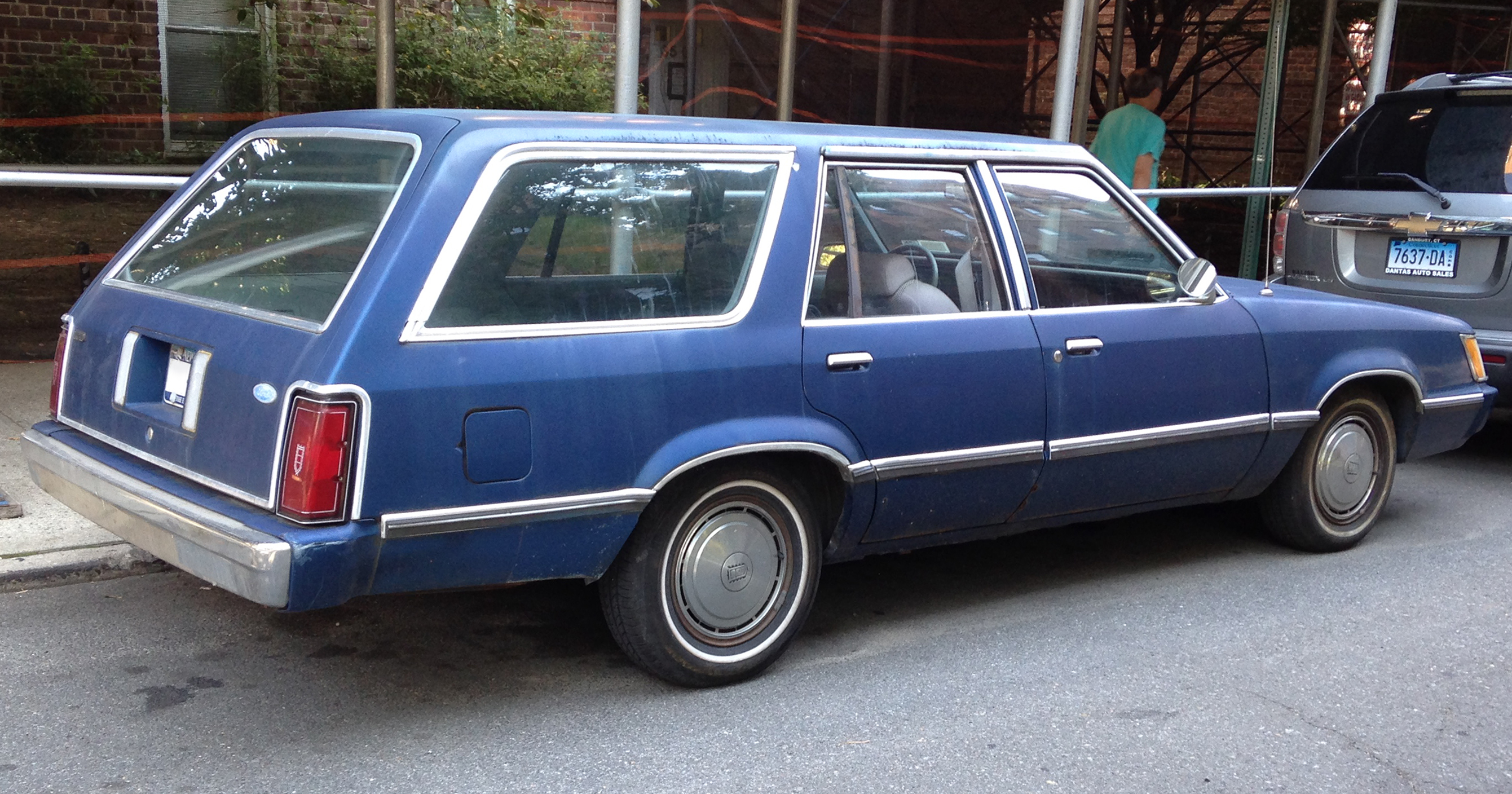
1984 Ford LTD station wagon; rear view

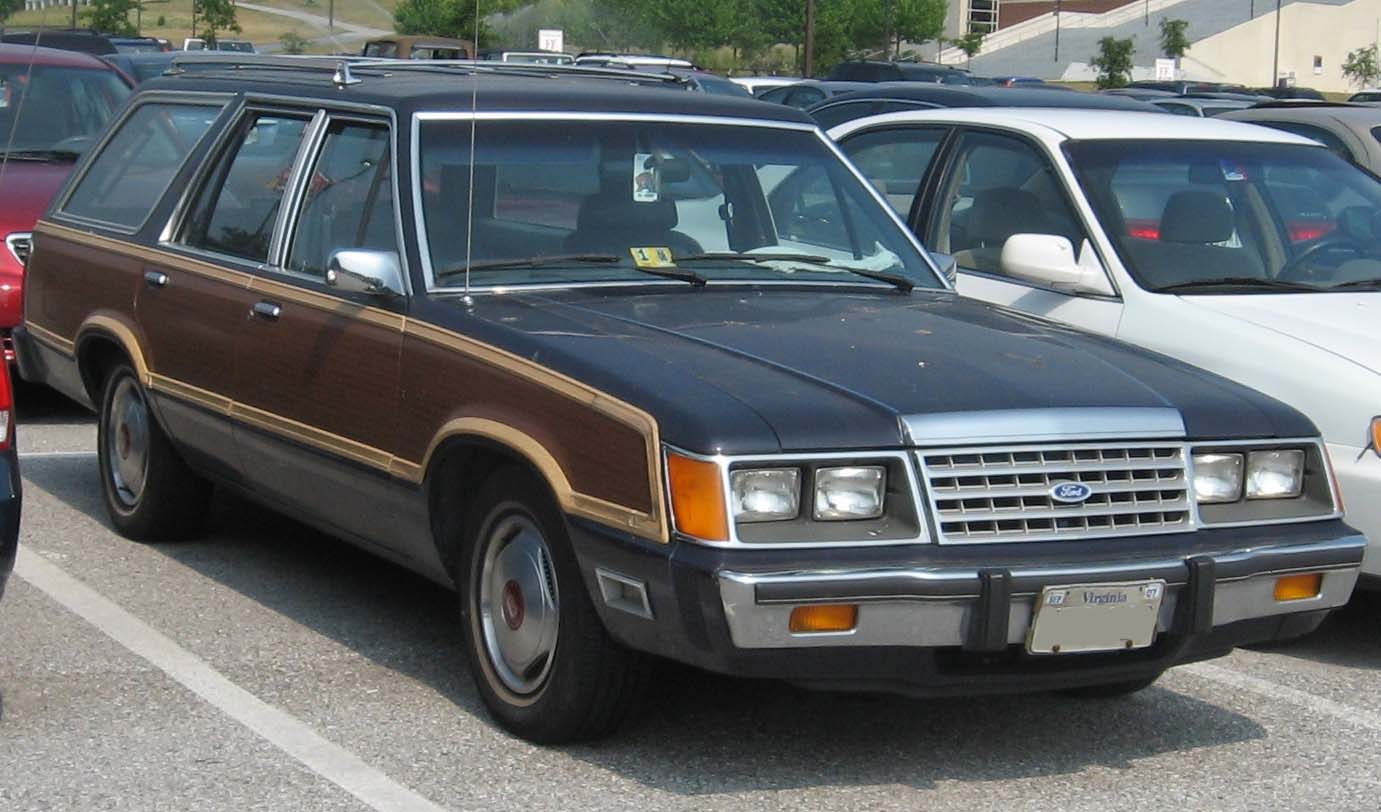
1986 Ford LTD Squire

=== LTD LX (1984–1985) ===
From the mid-1984 model year and throughout the 1985 model year, Ford offered a performance version of the LTD, marketed as the LTD LX. It came standard with a high-output 5.0 L CFI V8 engine, four-speed automatic transmission with overdrive, 600 lb-in front and 270 lb-in rear coil springs, front and rear sway bars, 10 inch front disc and 10 inch rear drum brakes, and a 3.27:1 rear gear ratio with a Traction-Lok differential.

The LX was the only LTD of this generation to have a tachometer in the instrument cluster (1977–1979 LTD IIs had an optional tachometer). The center console and floor-mounted shifter re-appeared, having last been available in the full-size 1972 model year and mid-size LTD IIs from 1977 through 1979 model years. Most available sources state that 3,260 units were produced, but Ford themselves have confirmed that 5,287 were built - 1,920 in 1984 and 3,367 in 1985.

Mercury's counterpart to the LX, the Marquis LTS, was available only in Canada and only in the 1985 model year, with 134 produced.

=== Police package ===
A police package of the mid-size LTD was produced. Featuring bigger sway bars and brakes, it also included bench seats with an automatic trunk opener located underneath the steering wheel. They were a factory option and most were equipped with light bars and police accessories, although some came without.

== Discontinuation ==
As the 1980s progressed, American auto manufacturers expanded their use of front-wheel drive from compact cars to mid-size cars (downsizing had rendered the previous intermediate segment obsolete). Following the success of the Chrysler K-Cars and the General Motors A-body sedans, Japanese manufacturers introduced sedans (at the smaller size of the segment), catering primarily towards North America, the Honda Accord sedan and Toyota Camry; by 1984, Ford was the last major manufacturer (non-premium brand) left marketing a mid-size sedan with rear-wheel drive.

For 1986, Ford introduced the Ford Taurus and Mercury Sable to replace the Ford LTD and Mercury Marquis. Beginning life as the replacement for the full-size LTD Crown Victoria, the mid-size Taurus not only was front-wheel drive, but its exterior was designed to optimize fuel efficiency, replacing the boxy LTD with one of the most aerodynamic sedans in the world. To help transition Ford buyers into this significant design change, the company continued to offer the LTD alongside its replacement partway into the 1986 model year.

Atlanta Assembly produced its final LTD on December 13, 1985 (13 days before the Taurus was unveiled); Chicago Assembly produced the final example on January 3, 1986.

Production Figures:

Ford LTD Production Figures
	Sedan	Wagon	Yearly Total
1983	111,813	43,945	155,758
1984	154,173	59,569	213,742
1985	162,884	42,642	205,526
1986	58,270	14,213	72,483
Total	487,140	160,369	647,509

== Brazil ==
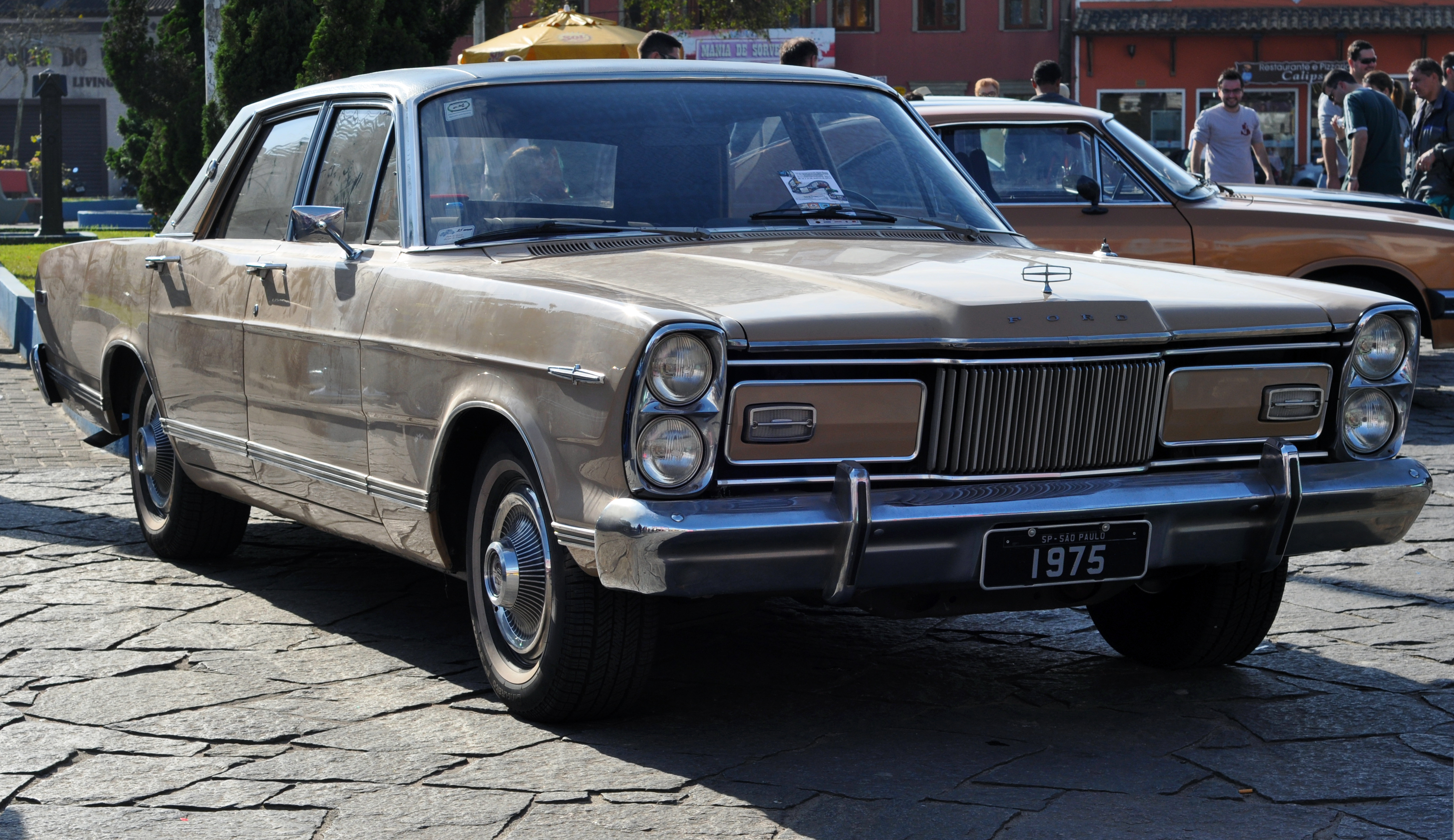
Ford LTD Brazil, 1975

The LTD was built locally in Brazil between 1967 and 1981, based on the 1966 Galaxie platform. A higher-end version called Landau was assembled locally as well, between 1971 and 1983. Later models were alcohol-powered.

== Venezuela ==
The LTD was introduced to the Venezuelan market in 1966, aiming to compete with Chrysler's New Yorker, with the LTD performing much better than its rivals. Over 85,000 LTDs were assembled in the Ford plant of Valencia, Venezuela, some for export to Colombia, Bolivia, Ecuador and Peru.

Versions of the North American Fox-body 1983–1986 LTD manufactured in Venezuela continued the use of the Granada name complete with uplevel Elite badged versions. There was also a Ford Cougar equivalent to the North American Mercury Marquis.
