= Downsize (automobile) =

Automobile industry term

In the context of the automobile industry, downsizing is a practice used to transition vehicles from one size segment to another. Commenced during the Malaise era, downsizing is done in response to consumer and government demands influencing vehicle design. As vehicle product lines completed their model cycles, automobile manufacturers developed the next generation of a vehicle with a smaller exterior footprint to allow for weight reduction and increased fuel economy, using a shortened wheelbase and body length.

In the American automobile industry, downsizing was a direct response to the 1973 oil crisis, which resulted in the enaction of CAFE fuel economy standards in 1975. By 1980, each auto manufacturer producing cars and light trucks for sale in the United States were required to produce an average of 20 mpg across their entire product line. In response, as full-size car lines completed their model cycles, General Motors, Ford Motor Company, and Chrysler Corporation sought to introduce full-size product lines with increased fuel efficiency while preserving interior dimensions as closely as possible. In 1977, General Motors became the first American manufacturer to introduce downsized versions of its full-size product line.

By the early 1980s, the downsizing practice had expanded to nearly all size segments as product lines completed model cycles within each company. Outside of the full-size segment, American manufacturers began to align more closely with European and Japanese manufacturers in size segments, leading to the abandonment of the North American-specific "intermediate" size segment. As a quicker and lower-cost alternative to complete model redesigns, a second strategy transitioned nameplates of larger vehicles to smaller ones as part of model updates.

The term engine downsizing is used when a manufacturer introduces a smaller-displacement engine (though not necessarily lower-output) for a product line in the interest of higher fuel economy.

== Research and progress ==
The University of Bath published research carried out by its Powertrain and Vehicle Research Centre which demonstrated that it is possible to reduce engine capacity by 60% and still achieve the torque curve of a modern, large-capacity naturally-aspirated engine, while encompassing the attributes necessary to employ such a concept in premium vehicles.

== Examples ==
=== General Motors ===
From 1977 to 1982, in order, General Motors would physically downsize its full-size, intermediate, compact, and subcompact vehicle product lines as each platform completed its model cycle. The strategy included vehicles from every General Motors division (Buick, Cadillac, Chevrolet, GMC, Oldsmobile, and Pontiac).

==== Full-size (B/C-platform, 1977) ====
As a direct response to the 1973 oil crisis, the first automobiles to undergo downsizing in the interest of increased fuel efficiency were the full-size GM B-body and C-body platforms (used by all divisions except GMC). Used by the Buick LeSabre/Electra, Chevrolet Impala/Caprice, Cadillacs, Oldsmobile 88/98, and Pontiac Catalina/Bonneville, the B and C-bodies were among the best-selling car platforms in North America at the time. On average, from 1976 to 1977, engineers shed an average of 12 in (300 mm) of body length and 750–800 lb (340–360 kg) in curb weight (with some vehicles losing over 1,000 lb (450 kg)of curb weight).

For 1977 only, the full-size GM product line adopted a smaller exterior footprint than the A-platform intermediates; careful engineering led to negligible reductions of interior space over preceding full-size vehicles. In both the interest of fuel economy and weight reduction, the B/C-platform ended the use of "big-block" V8 engines outside of the Cadillac division; after 1980, a 350 cubic-inch V8 was the largest engine fitted in a B-body chassis.

In 1985, General Motors underwent a further downsizing of many of its nameplates using the B-platform chassis. With the exception of station wagons, the full-size cars of Buick, Oldsmobile, and Pontiac (along with most of the Cadillac model line) were downsized, becoming front-wheel drive, mid-size sedans. From 1986 to 1990, the sole rear-wheel-drive sedans produced were the Chevrolet Caprice and Cadillac (Fleetwood) Brougham; the Buick Roadmaster sedan was introduced for 1992.

Following the end of the 1996 model year, General Motors ended production of the B-platform. While not intended as a direct replacement, GM sourced sedans based from the GM Zeta platform from 2008 to 2017, produced by Holden (GM Australia).

General Motors downsizing (B/C full-size platforms, 1977)

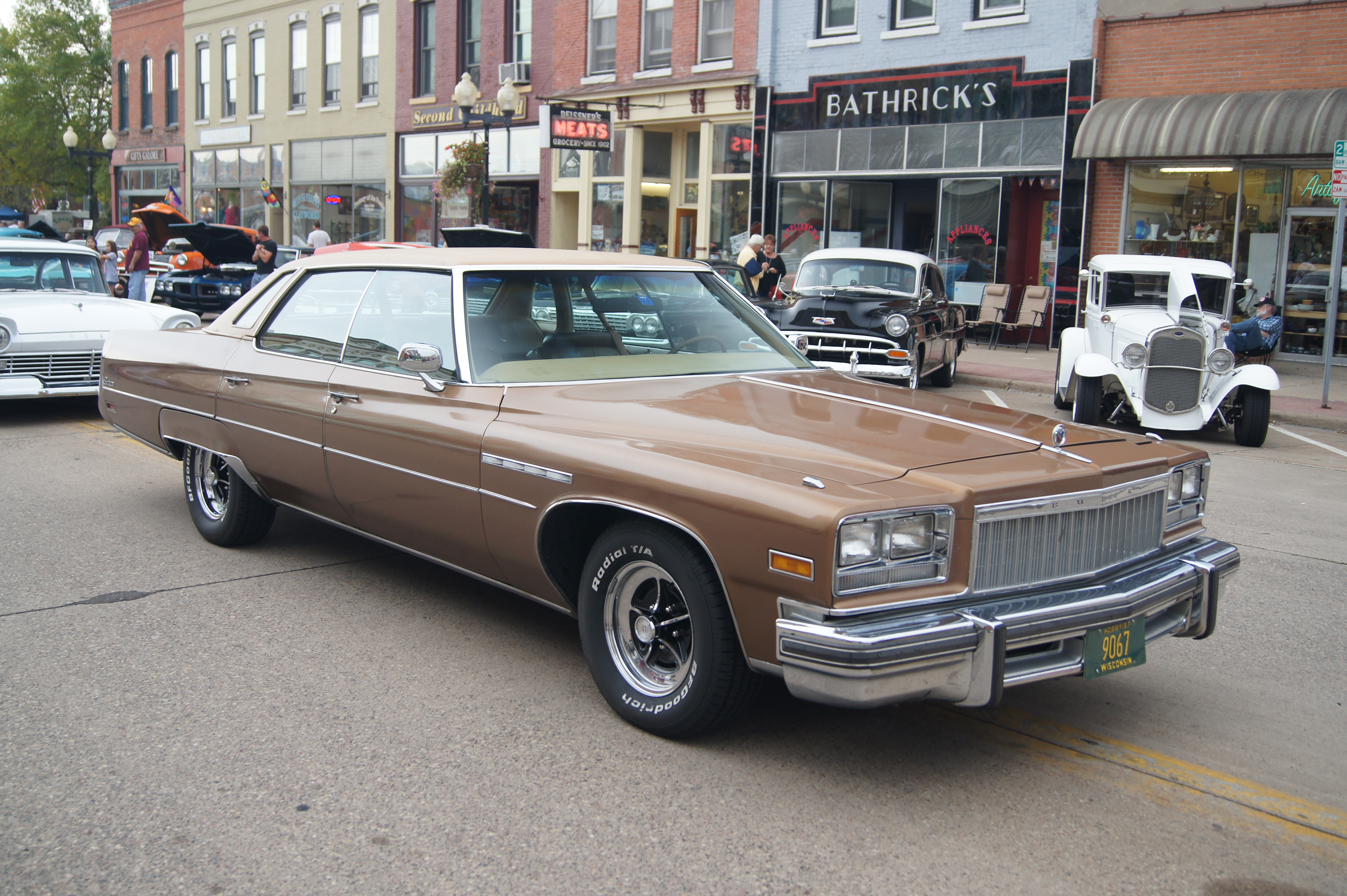
1976 Buick Electra 225

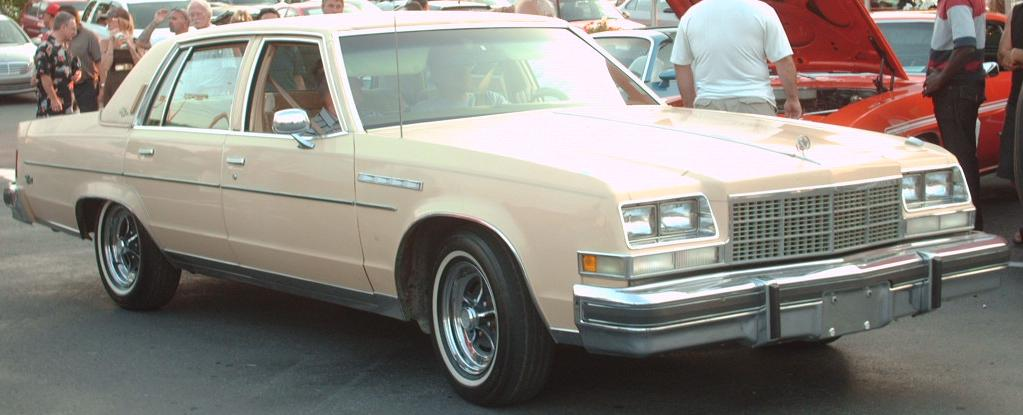
1977 Buick Electra Park Avenue

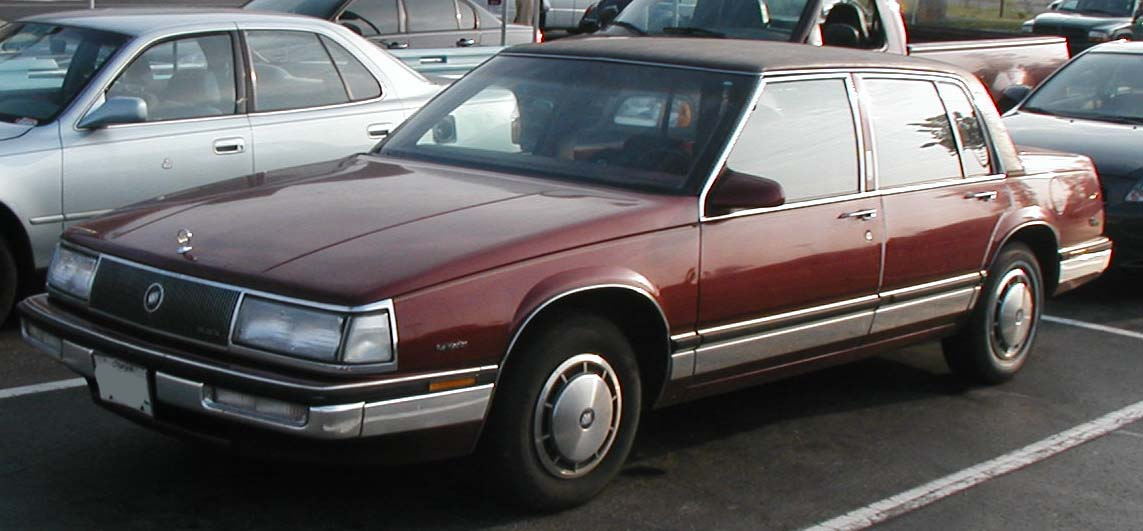
1987–1990 Buick Electra Park Avenue

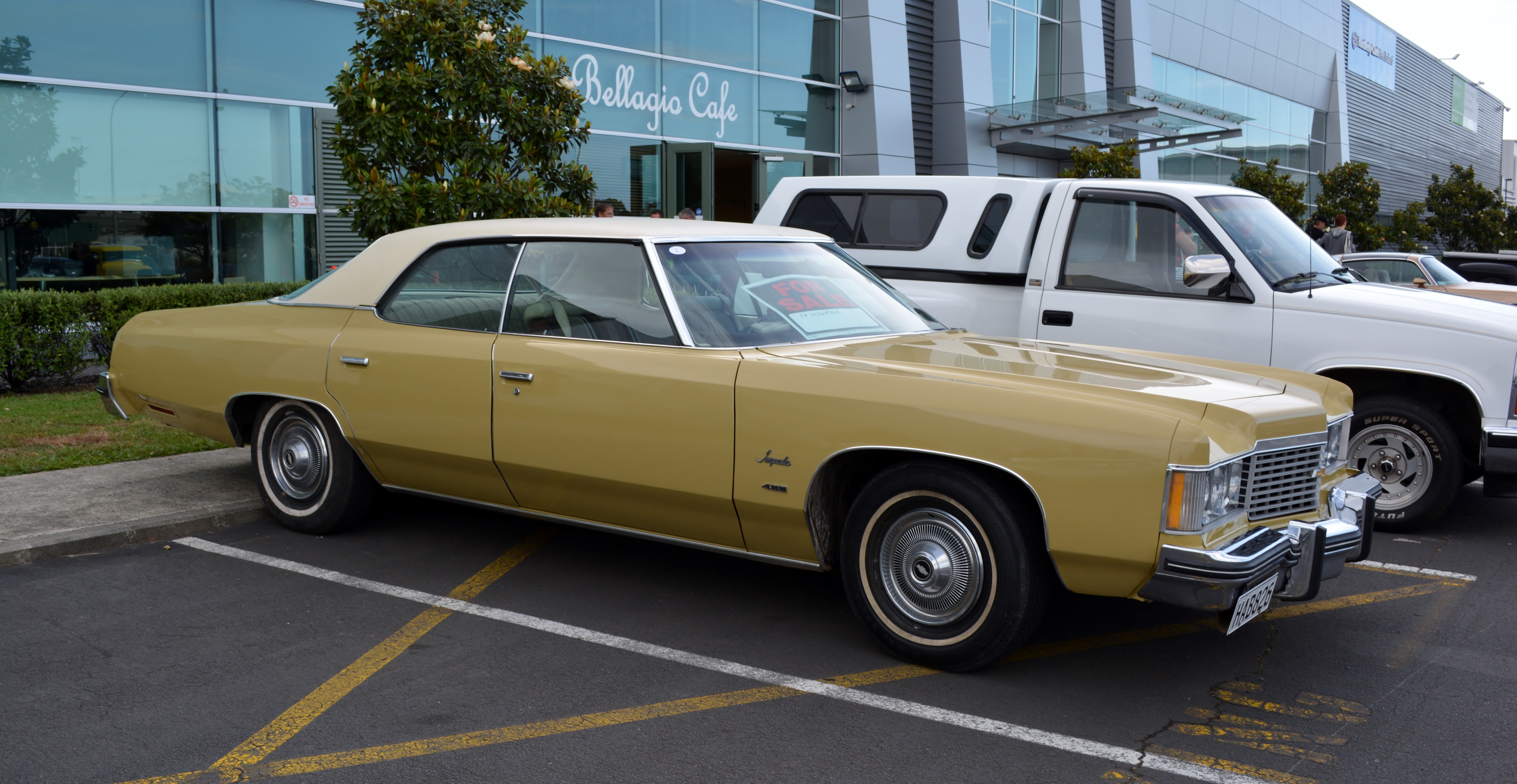
1974 Chevrolet Impala hardtop

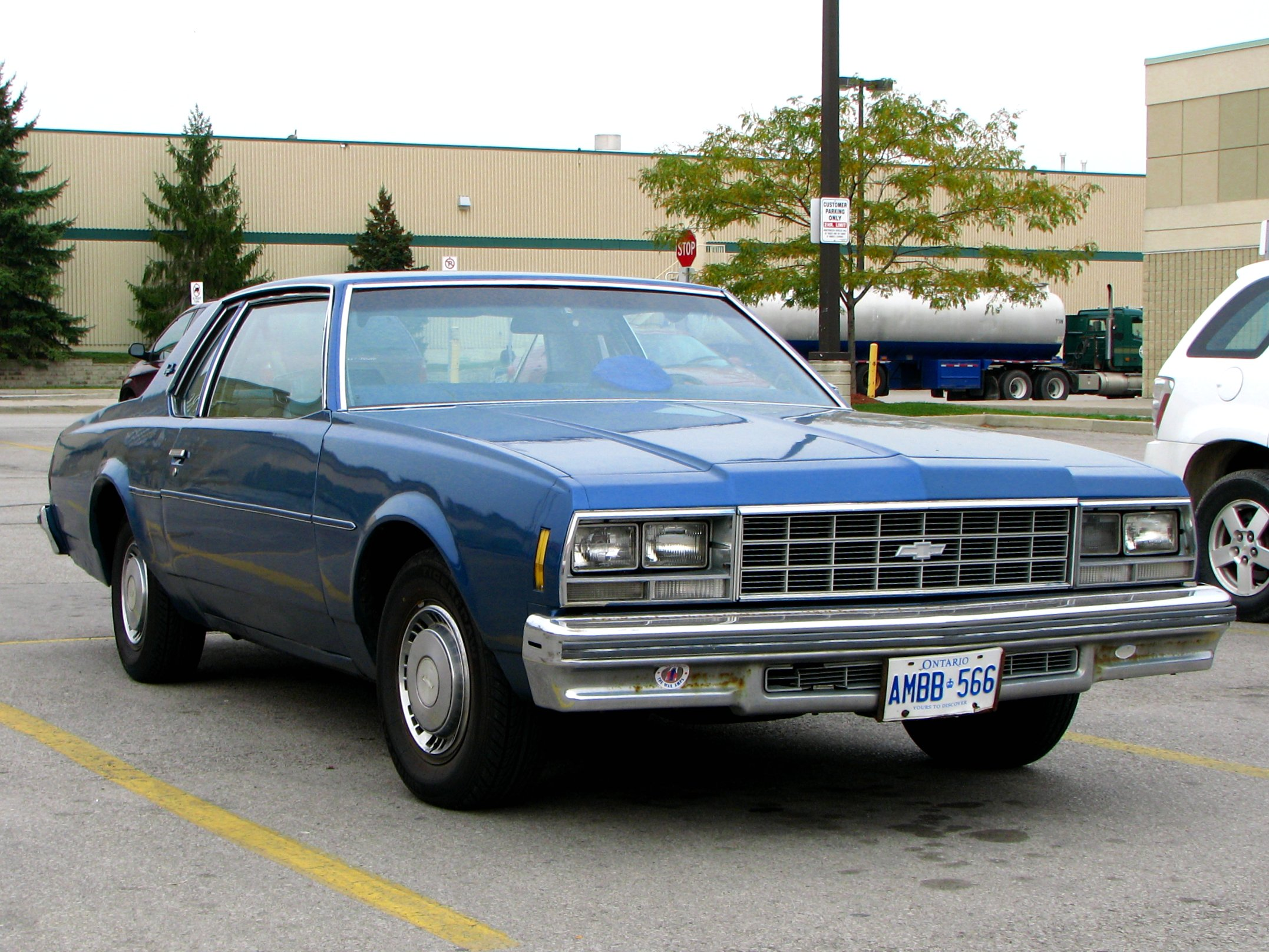
1977–1979 Chevrolet Impala two-door

==== Intermediate (A-platform, 1978) ====
Following the downsizing of General Motors full-size vehicles, for 1977, GM A-platform (intermediate/mid-size) vehicles shared a common wheelbase and larger exterior dimensions than full-size B/C-platform counterparts. To eliminate the design overlap and to expand the fuel efficiency of the entire GM model line, for 1978, the GM intermediate product lines (A-platform) underwent their own downsizing. Essentially abandoning the intermediate designation in favor of becoming mid-size vehicles, the A-body vehicles adopted a footprint slightly smaller than the X-body compacts. In a reduction similar to the full-size model lines, the A-body downsizing shed approximately 12–15 inches (30–38 cm) of body length and 500–1,000 pounds of curb weight (depending on model configuration).

In 1982, GM downsized several of its mid-size sedans, as the A-platform shifted to front-wheel drive; the remaining A-platform variants (two-door coupes and coupe utilities) were redesignated under the GM G-platform. For 1988, all GM G-body vehicles were downsized slightly and replaced by the front-wheel drive GM10 platform (later the GM W platform), which also was phased in as the replacement for Chevrolet and Pontiac variants of A-platform vehicles.

General Motors downsizing (midsize A-platform, 1978)

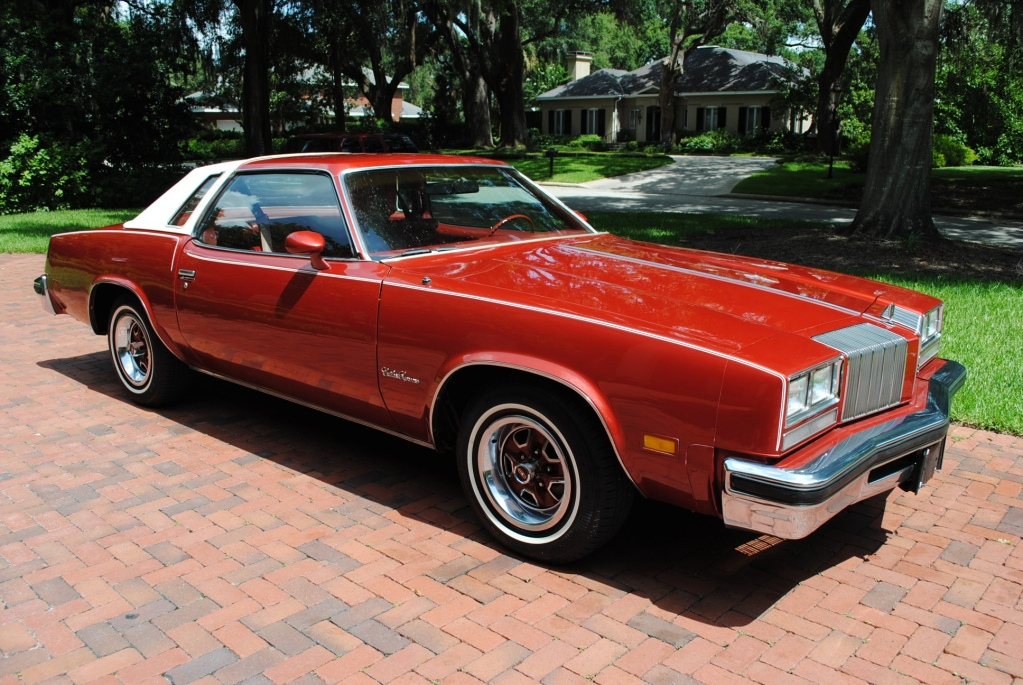
1977 Oldsmobile Cutlass Supreme

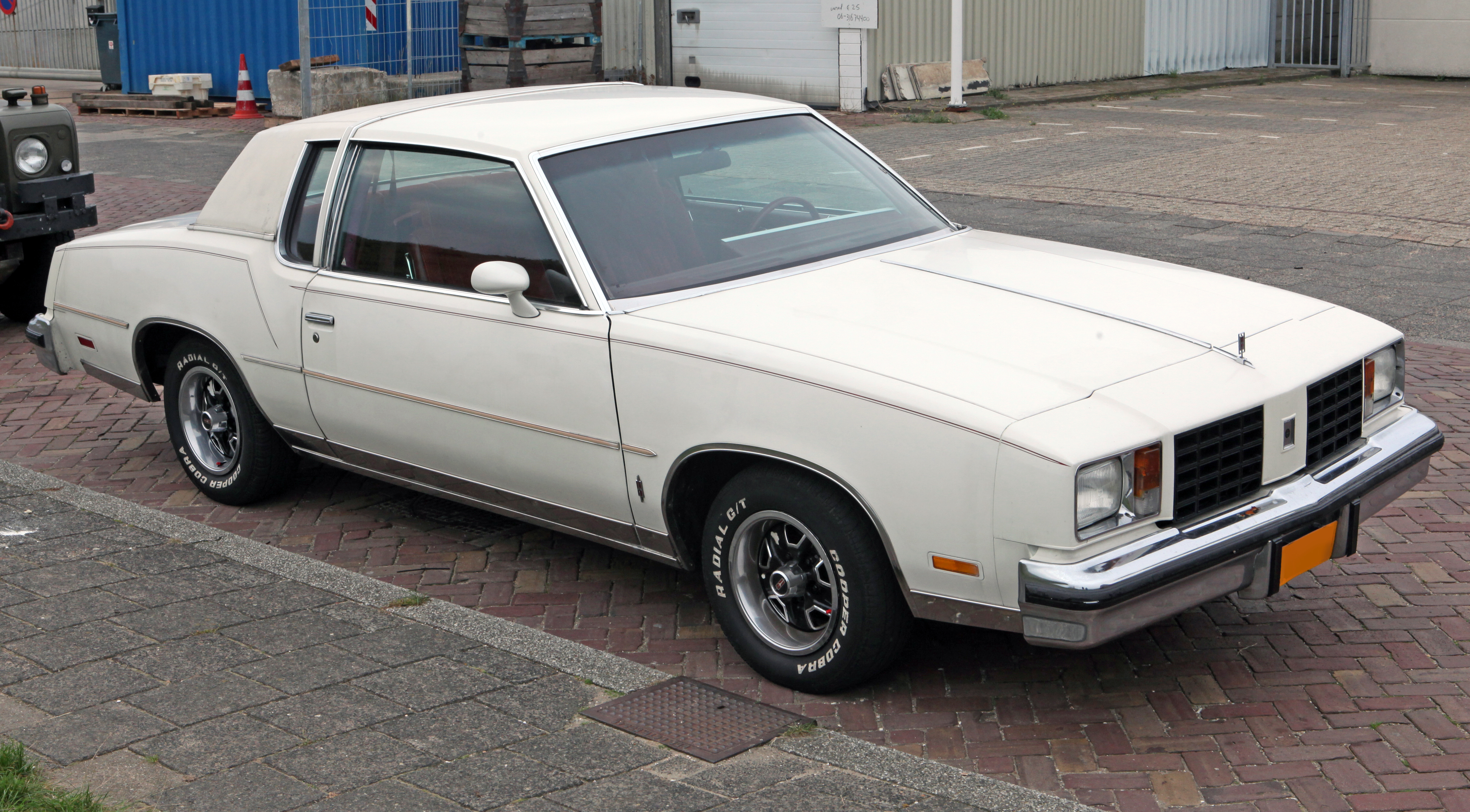
1980 Oldsmobile Cutlass Salon

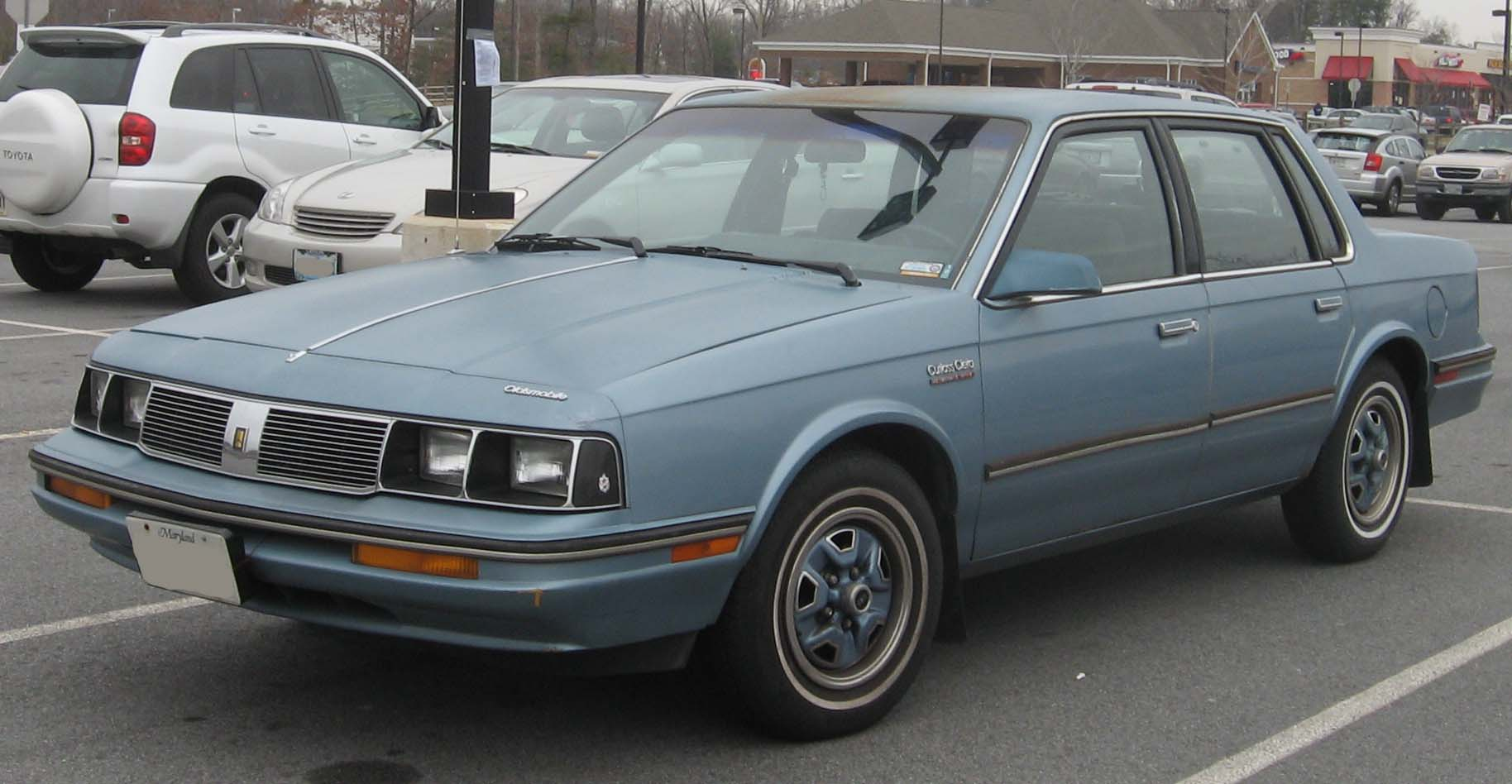
1985–1988 Oldsmobile Cutlass Ciera

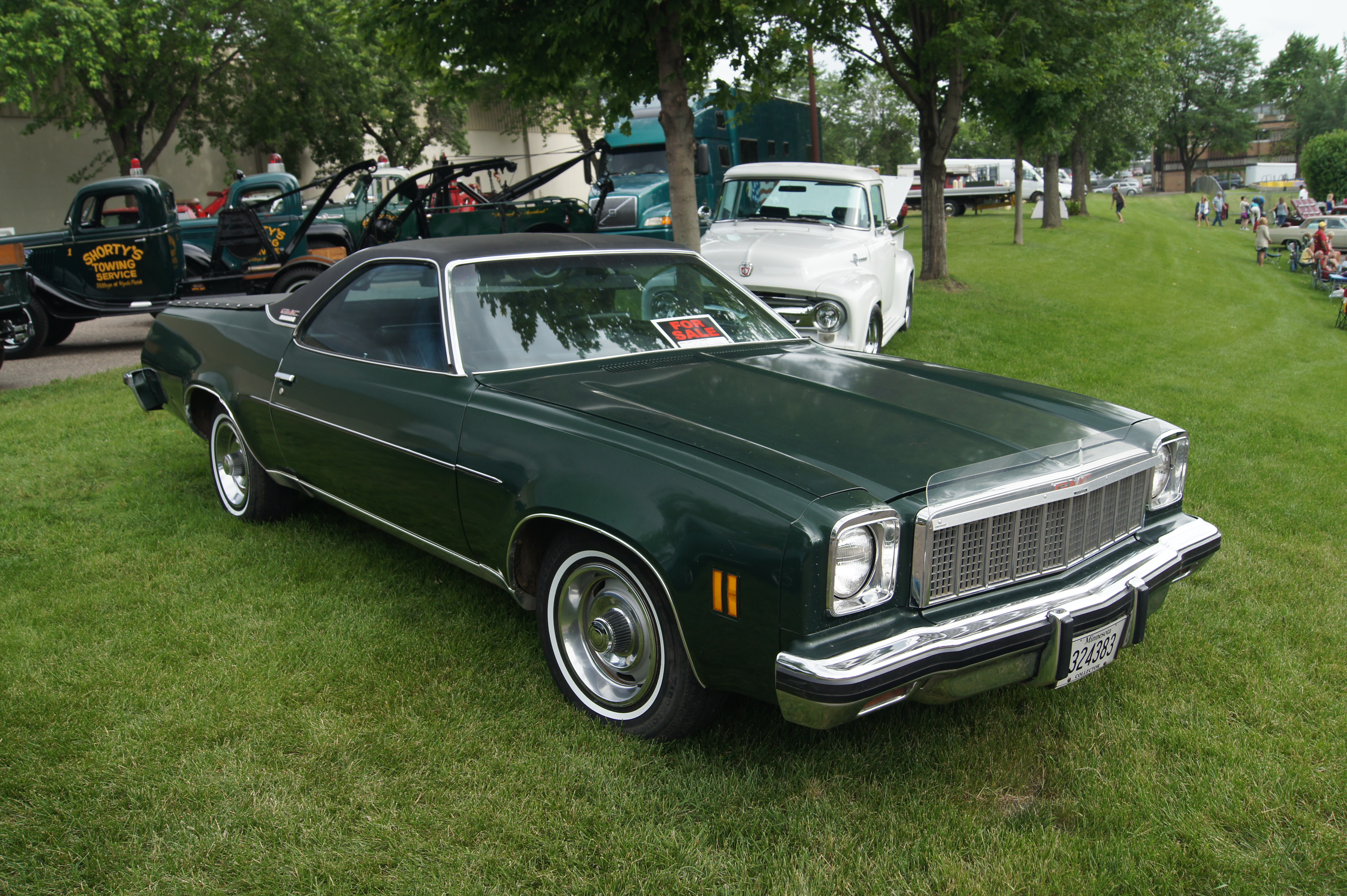
1975 GMC Sprint

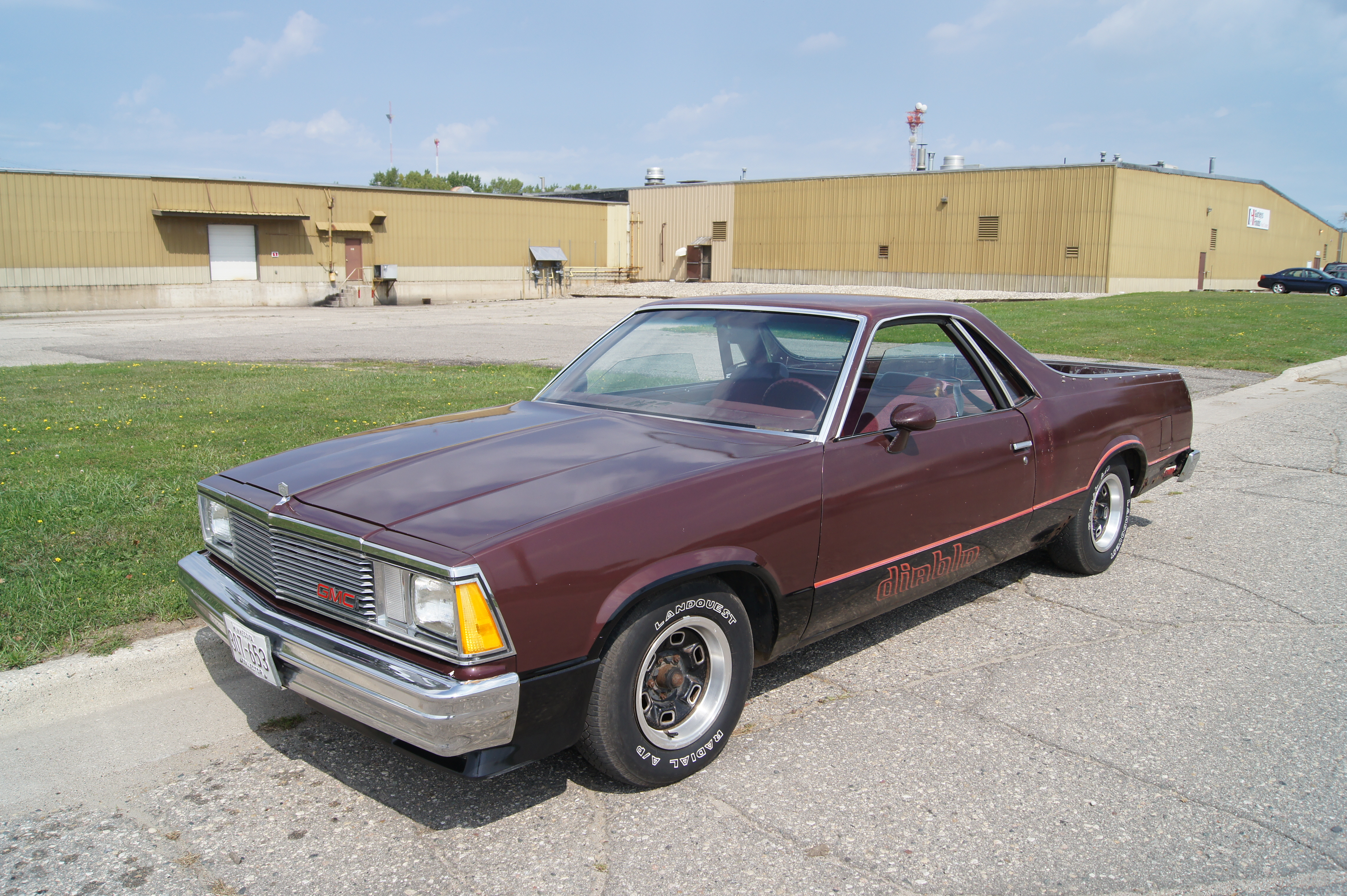
1979 GMC Caballero Diablo

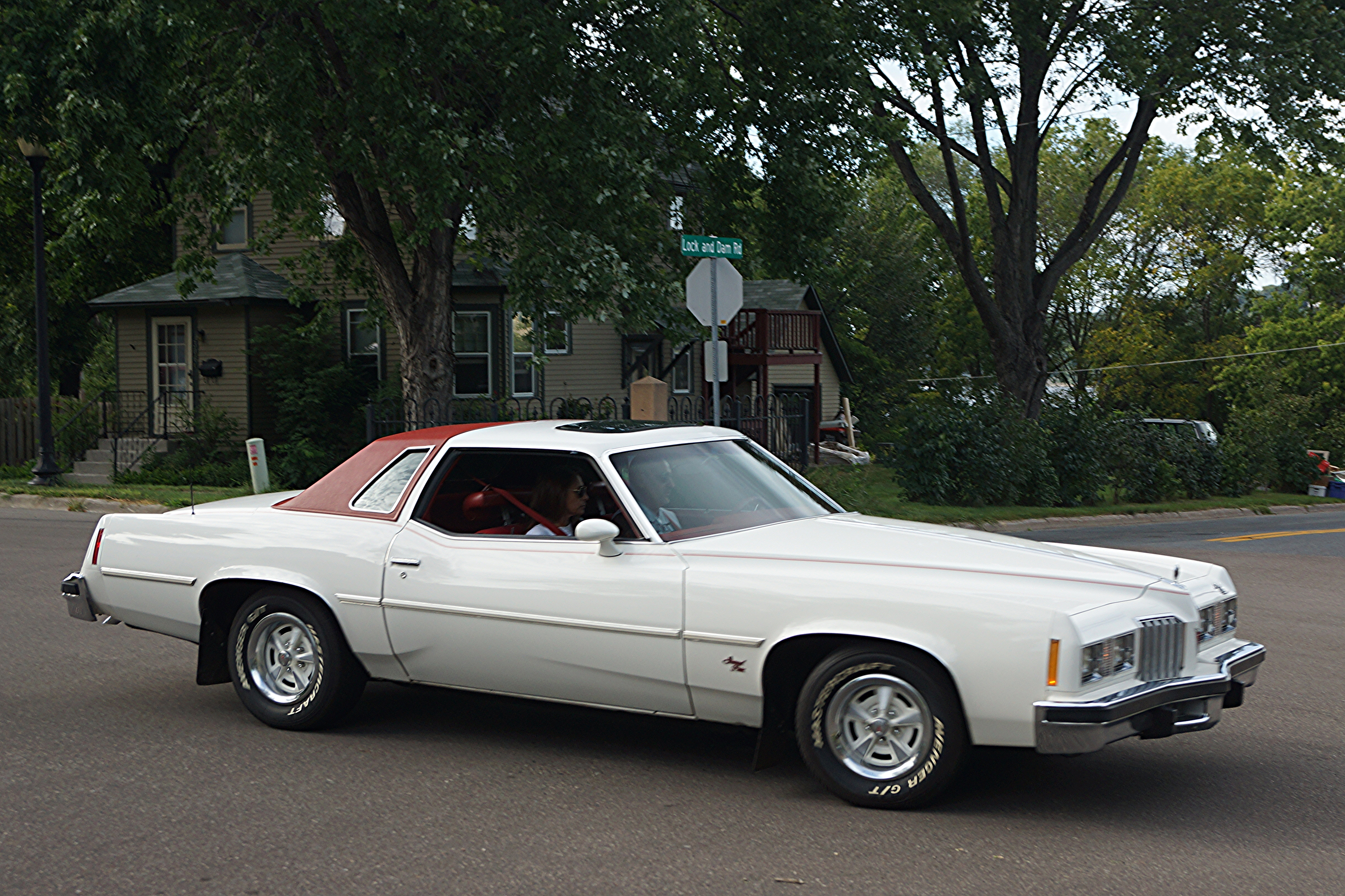
1977 Pontiac Grand Prix

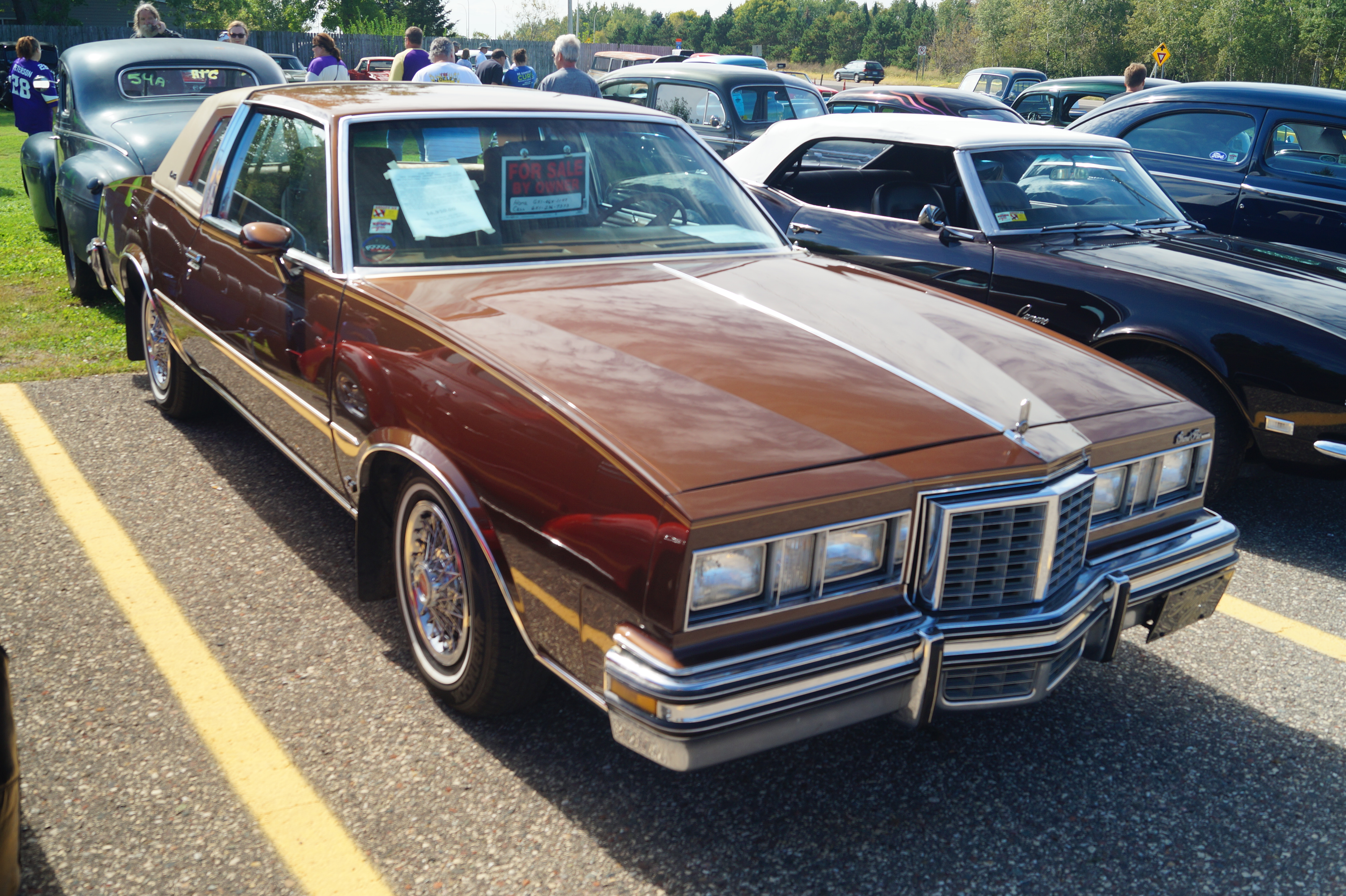
1979 Pontiac Grand Prix LJ

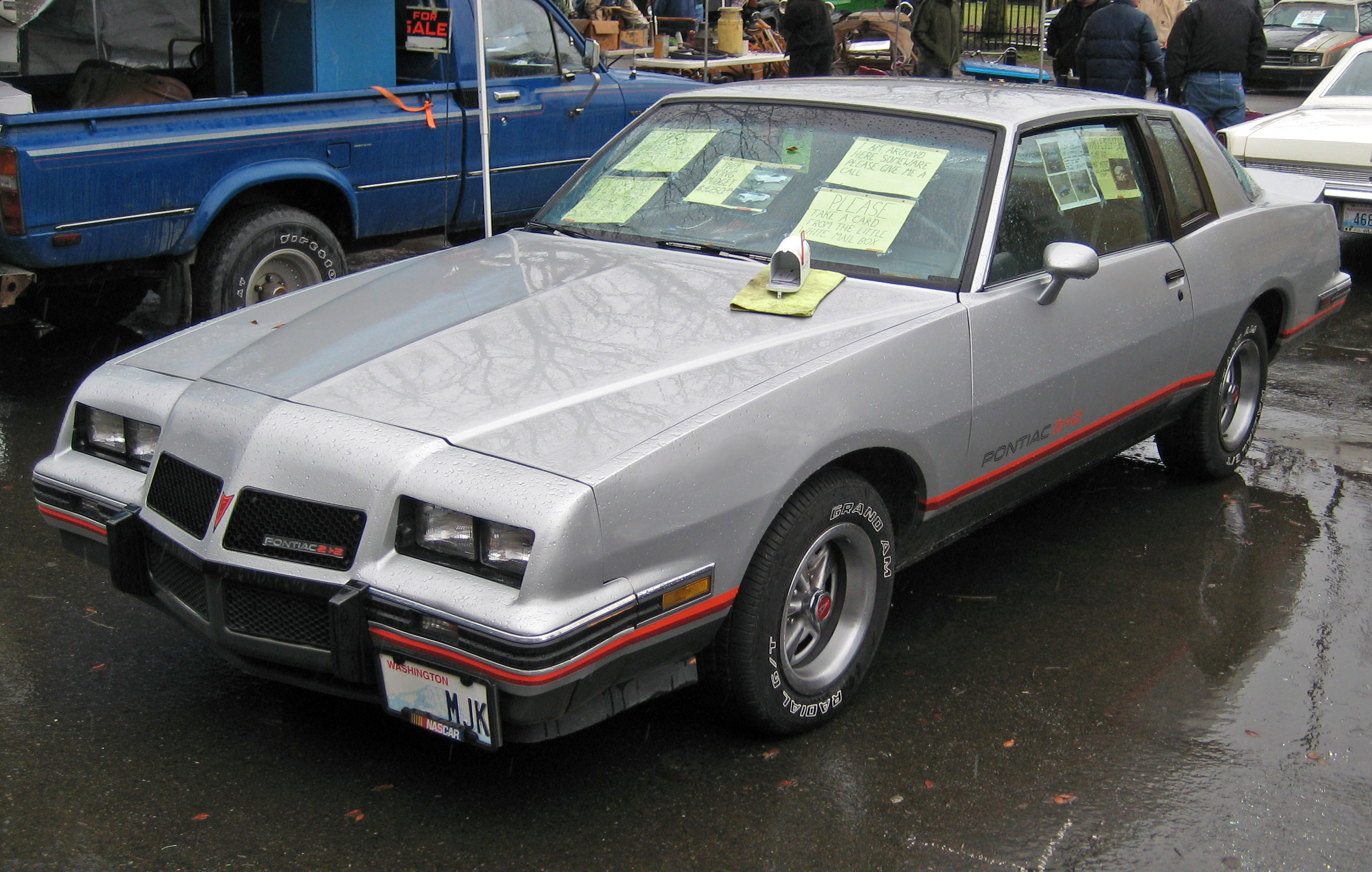
1986 Pontiac Grand Prix 2+2

==== Compact (X-platform, 1980) ====
The downsizing of the General Motors X-platform compact vehicles for 1980 also coincided with the transition of GM to front-wheel drive. Although the company had produced front-wheel drive vehicles since 1966, the 1980 X-cars were the first front-wheel drive GM vehicles outside of the luxury car segment. Replacing the Chevrolet Nova, the Chevrolet Citation (alongside the Buick Skylark, Oldsmobile Omega, and Pontiac Phoenix) shed 20 in (51 cm) of length, 6 in (15 cm) of wheelbase, and 800 lb (360 kg) of curb weight. While nearly matching the Chevrolet Vega in exterior size, the interior dimensions closely matched the previous-generation X-platform sedans.

While its A-platform counterpart continued through 1996, the X-platform was discontinued in 1985, replaced by several different designs. To avoid overlap with the GM J platform, the GM L and N platforms did not undergo any significant size reductions, largely ending downsizing through the GM compact segment.

General Motors downsizing (Compact X-platform)

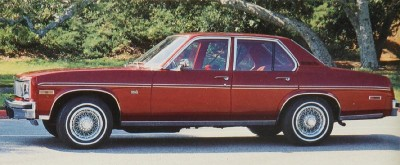
1978 Chevrolet Nova Custom

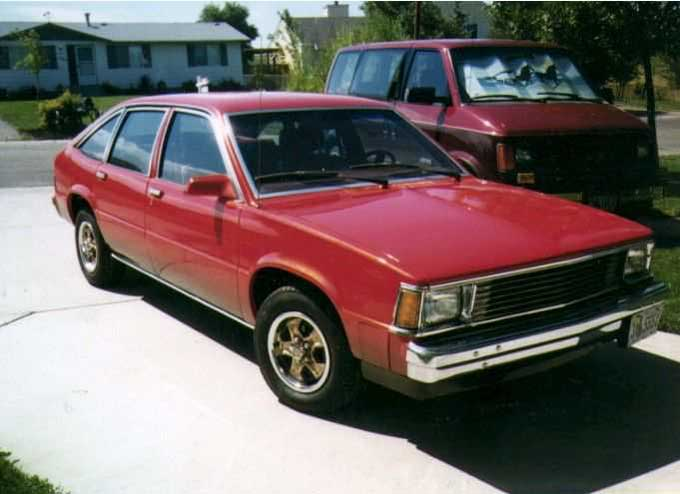
1984 Chevrolet Citation

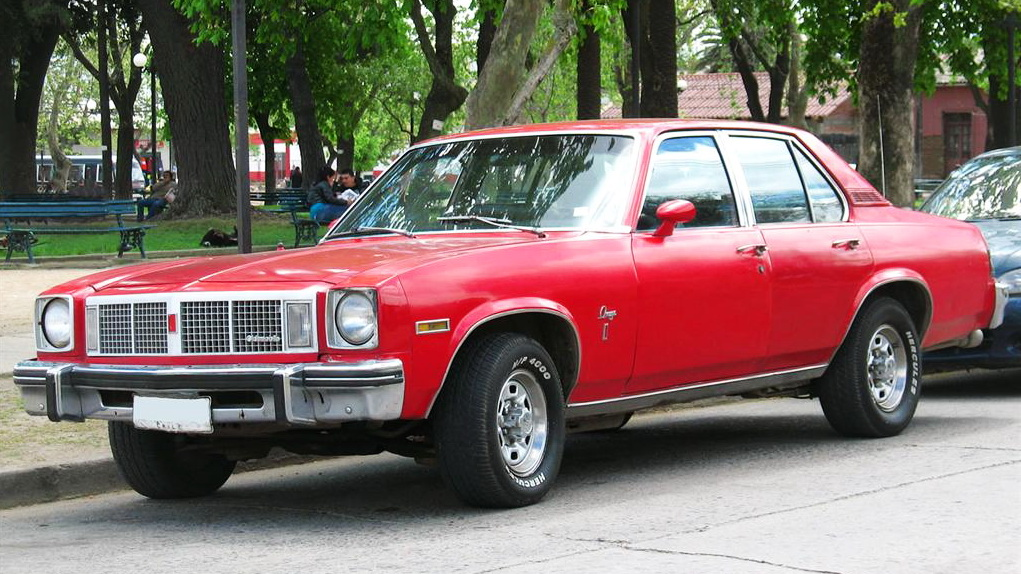
1977 Oldsmobile Omega

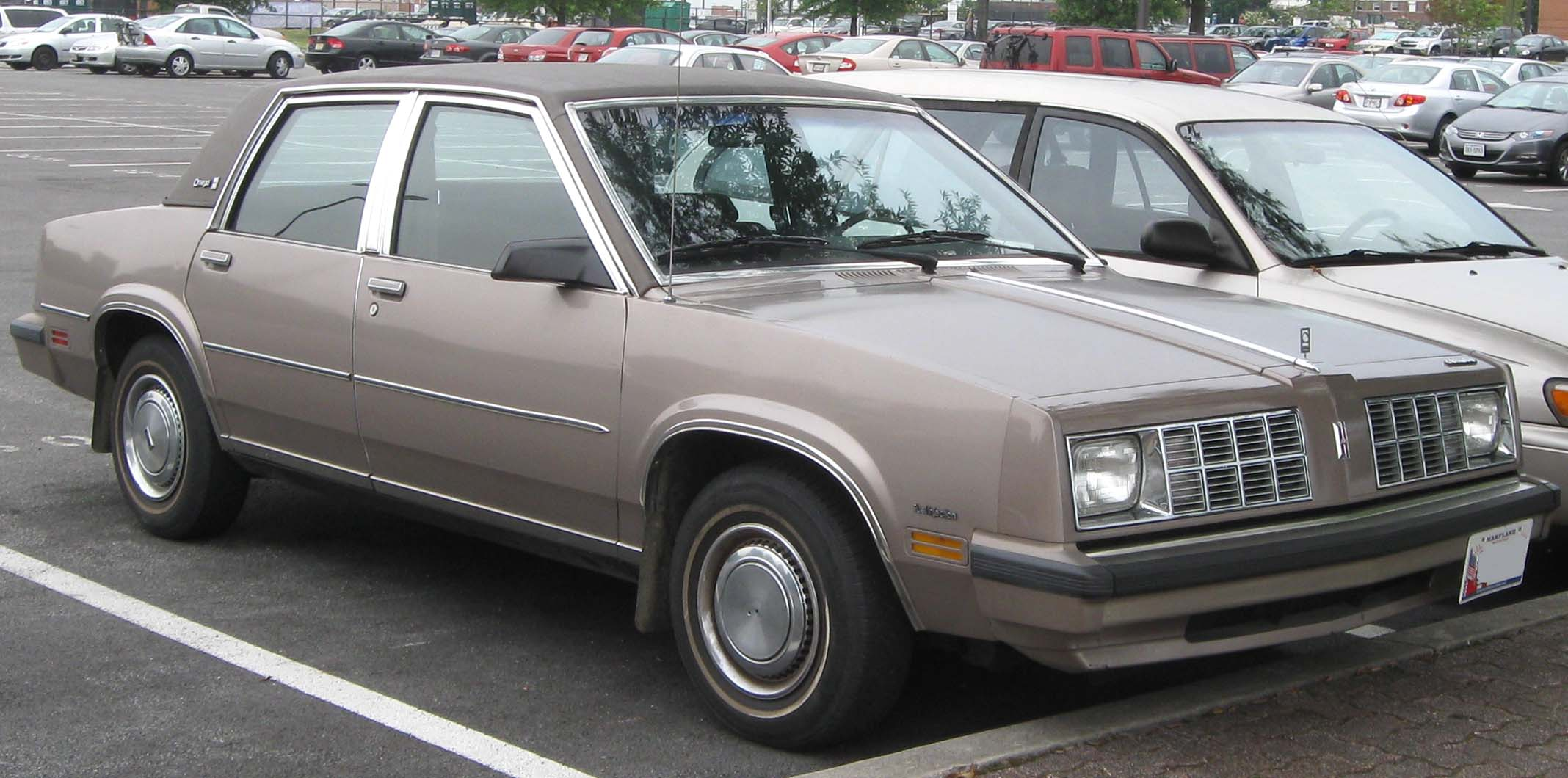
1984 Oldsmobile Omega

==== Subcompact (H-platform to J-platform, 1982) ====
For the subcompact segment, General Motors transitioned its model range to front-wheel drive in 1981 for the 1982 model year. Following the 1980 discontinuation of the H-platform, GM introduced the J-platform, with models for each division (except GMC). While longer in wheelbase than its Chevrolet Monza predecessor, the Chevrolet Cavalier was shorter in length, with higher-efficiency powertrains.

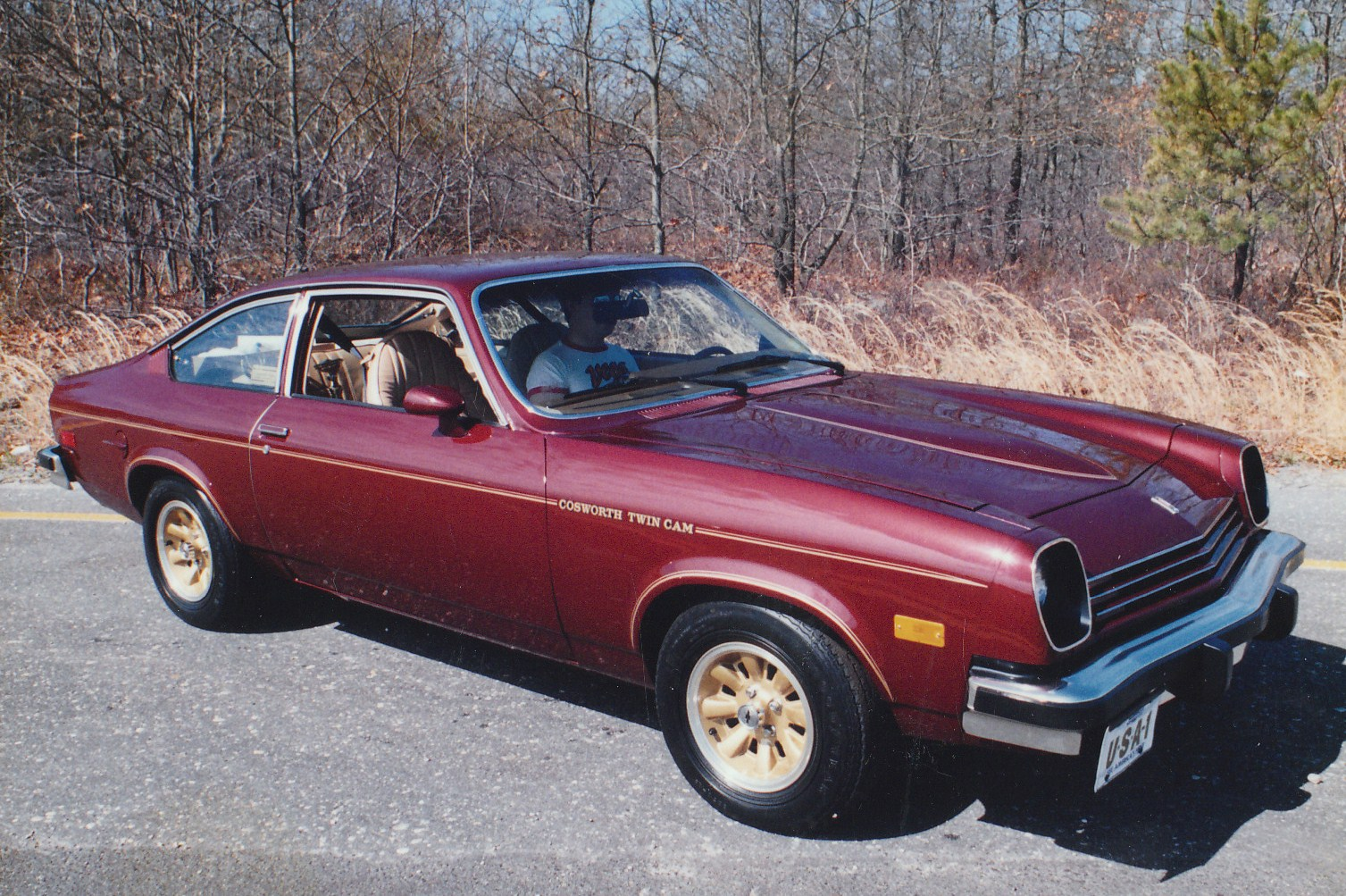
1976 Chevrolet Cosworth Vega

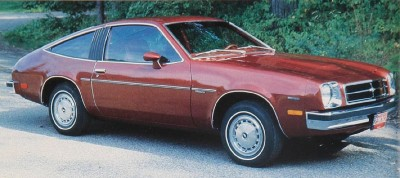
1978 Chevrolet Monza

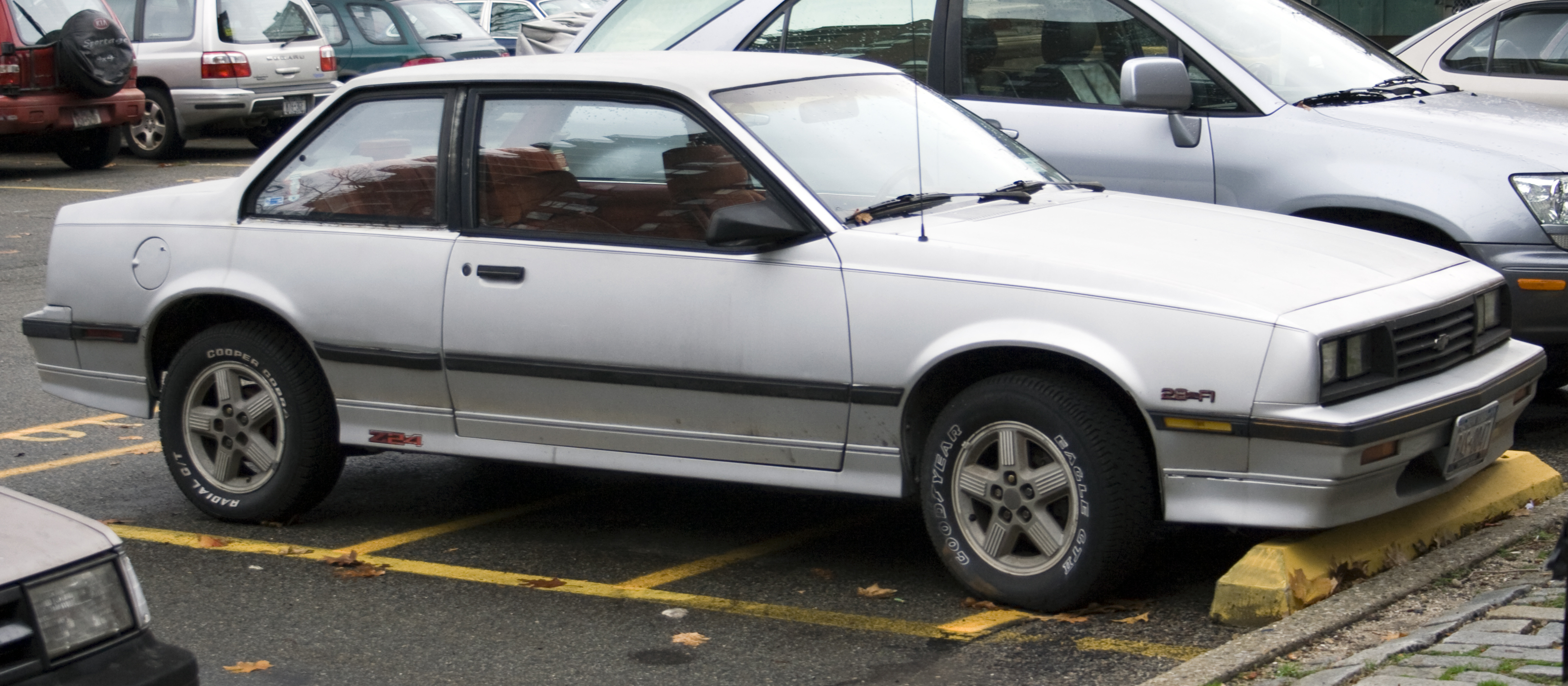
1986 Chevrolet Cavalier Z24

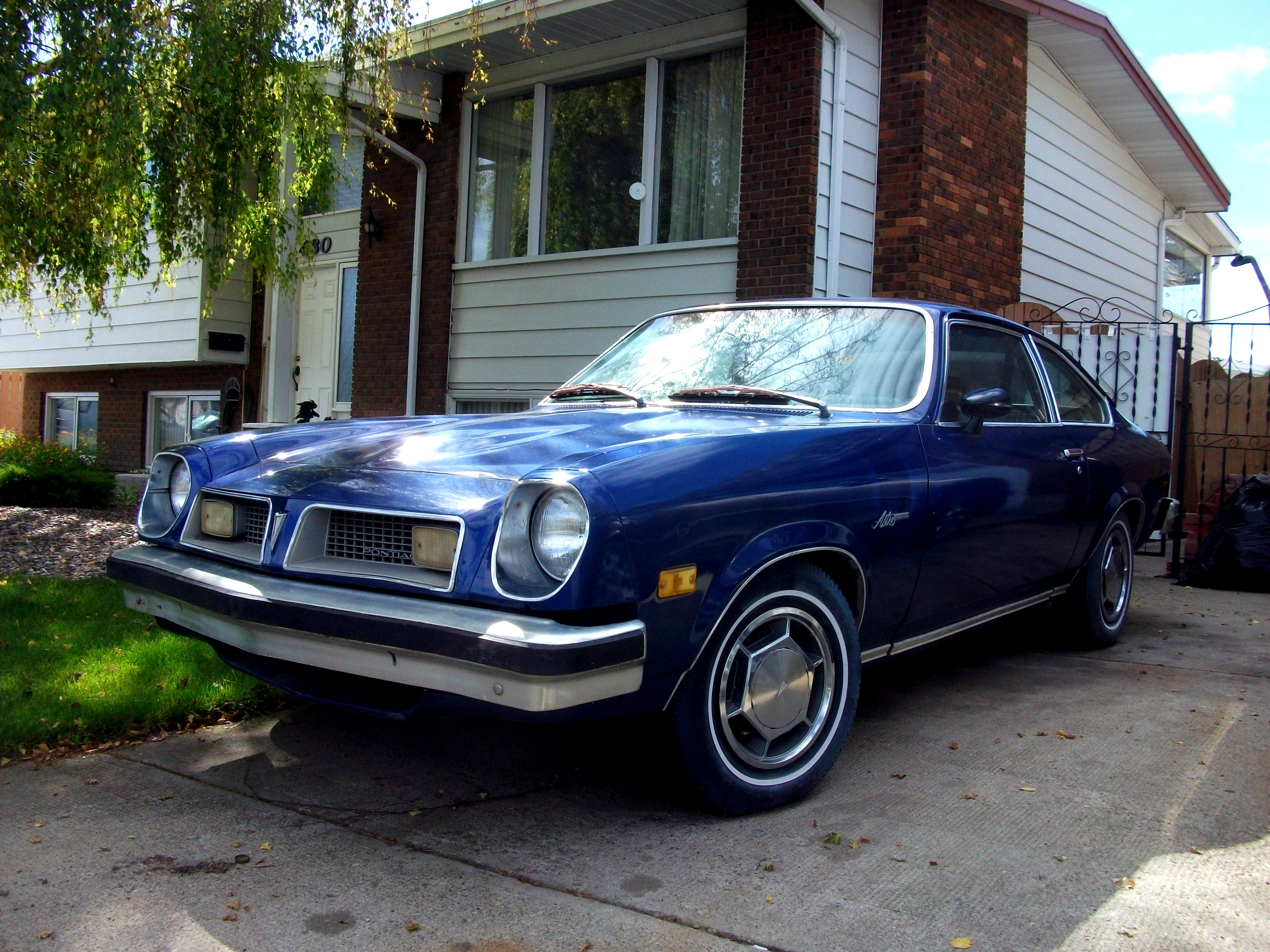
Pontiac Astre

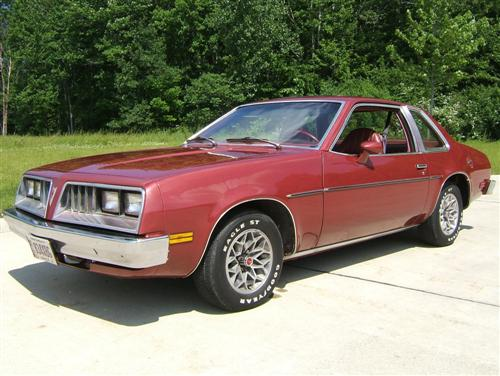
1978 Pontiac Sunbird

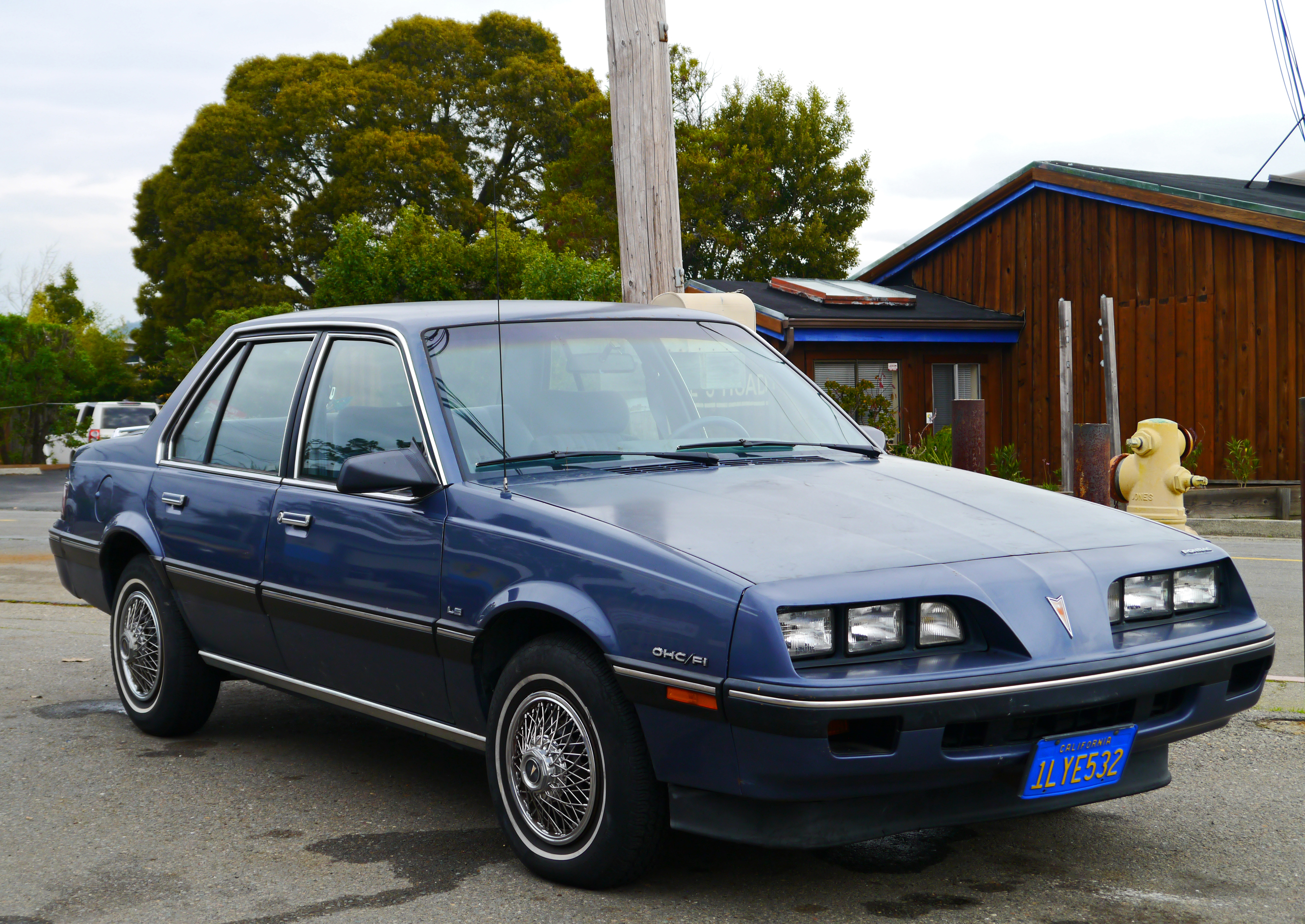
1984 Pontiac 2000 Sunbird

=== Chrysler ===
Nearly concurrent with the 1973 gas crisis, Chrysler introduced larger and heavier 1974 full-size models for Plymouth, Dodge, and Chrysler. In contrast to Ford and General Motors, full-size vehicle sales of Chrysler would never recover from the gas crisis, along with other factors, the company was nearly forced into bankruptcy by the end of the 1970s.

Forced to concentrate its remaining resources on development of fuel-efficient compact cars, Chrysler created a separate strategy from Ford and General Motors, adapting existing vehicle architecture for new model segments.

==== Full-size (R-platform, 1979) ====
For the 1979 model year, the success found by GM and the upcoming introduction of smaller full-size cars by Ford necessitated a response from Chrysler. Unable to commit resources to downsize its full-size C-platform chassis (redesigned in 1974), Chrysler was relegated to introducing the R-body vehicles, matching Ford and GM in exterior footprint. Wearing all-new exterior sheetmetal, the Chrysler R-platform vehicles were a revision of the 1962–1978 Chrysler B platform (produced for the intermediate segment). With poor sales (outside of fleet markets), Chrysler ended production of R-platform vehicles, becoming the final fullsize Chrysler vehicles until the 1992 LH-platform vehicles.

To replace the R-platform, for 1982, the Chrysler New Yorker and Plymouth Gran Fury nameplates shifted to the Chrysler M platform. An evolution of the compact 1976–1980 Dodge Aspen/Plymouth Volaré, the M-platform vehicles matched the 1973–1977 GM A-platform vehicles closely in wheelbase and length. Supported primarily by fleet sales, the Dodge Diplomat (which replaced the Dodge St. Regis) and Plymouth Gran Fury were produced through the 1989 model year; neither model line saw a direct replacement. With the exception of the Dodge Viper and Plymouth Prowler, the 1989 M-platform vehicles were the last rear-wheel drive Chrysler cars produced until the 2005 introduction of the LX platform.

Chrysler downsizing (full-size C, R, M-platforms, 1979)

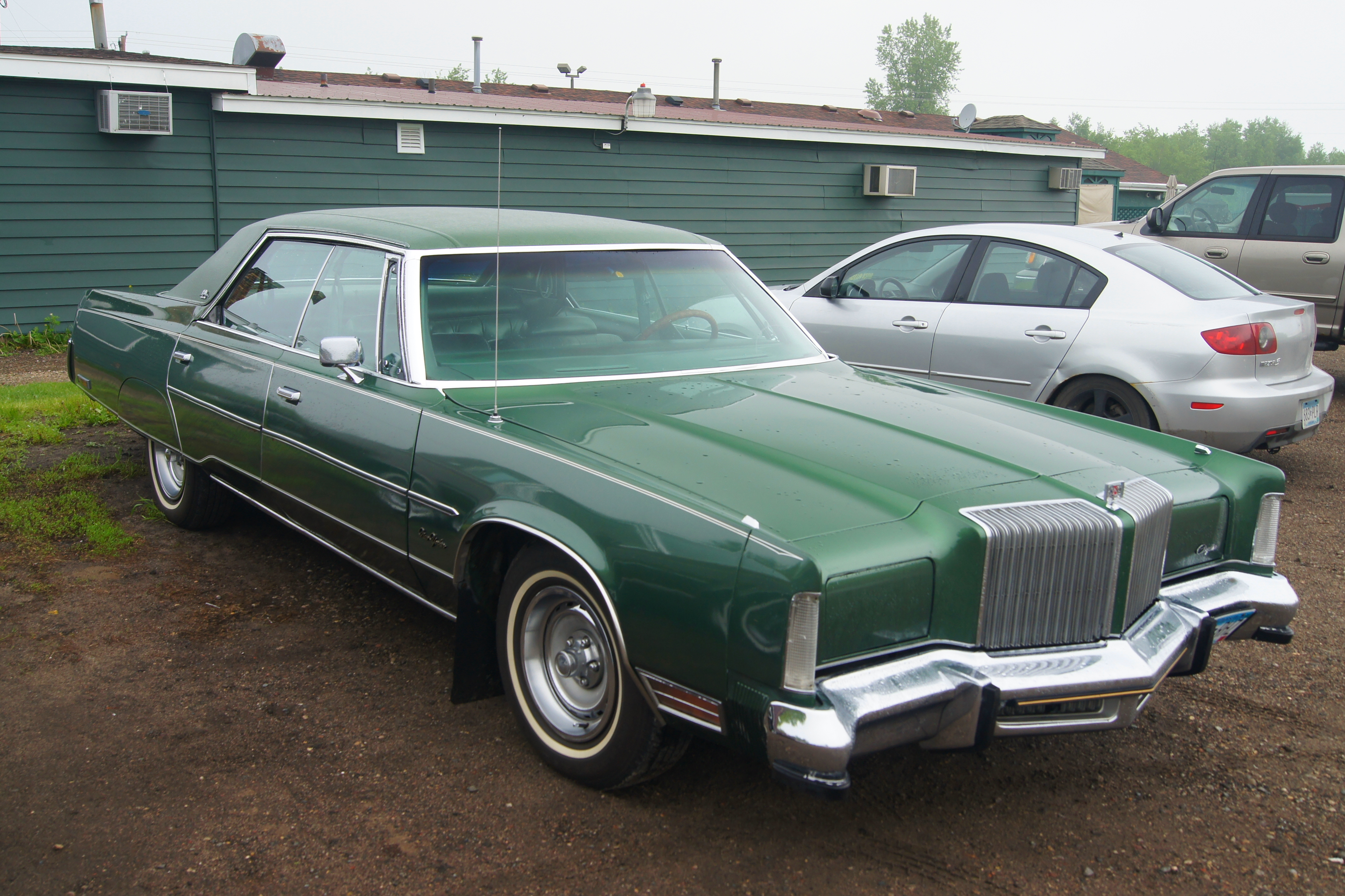
1977 Chrysler New Yorker Brougham (C-body)

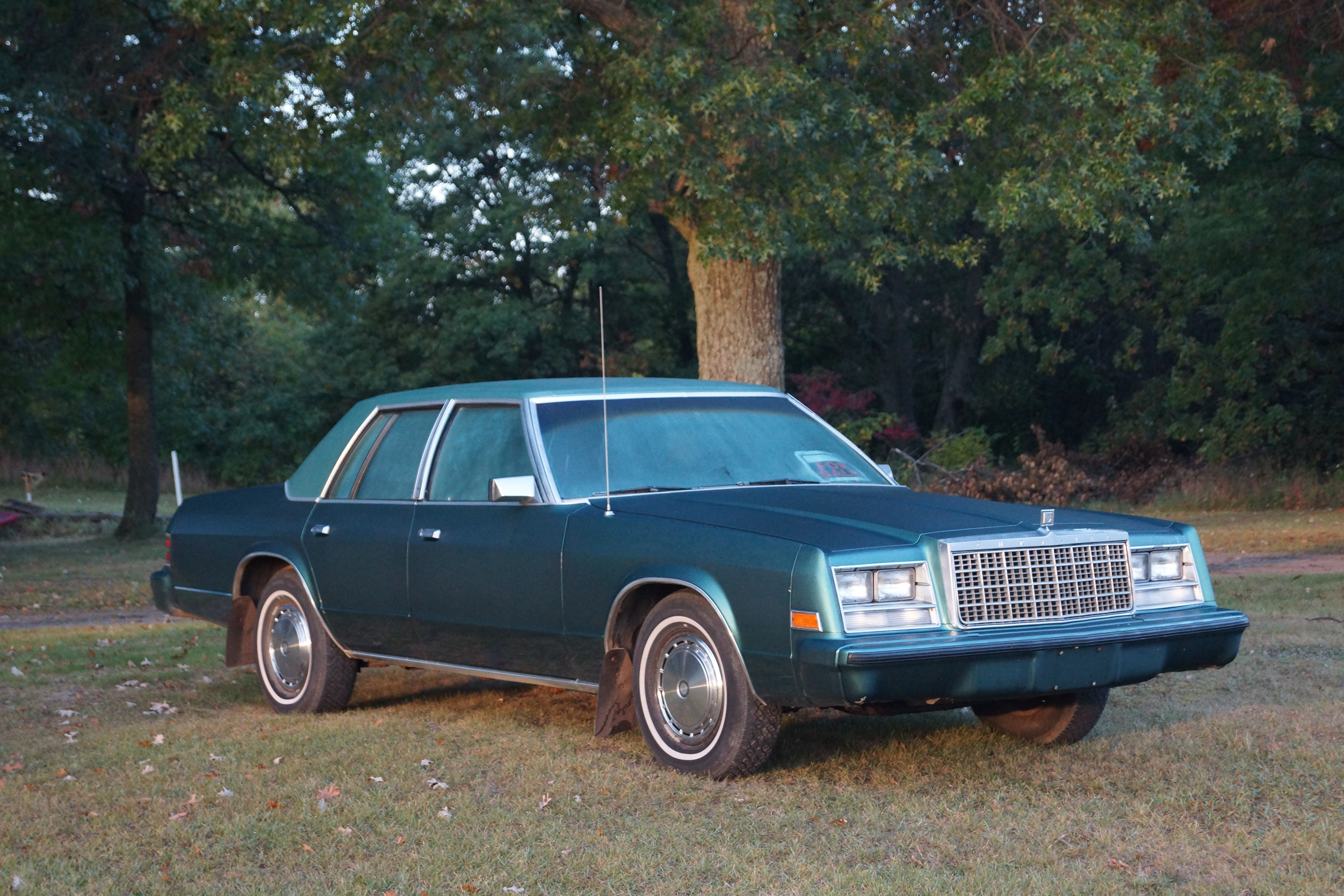
1979 Chrysler Newport (R-body)

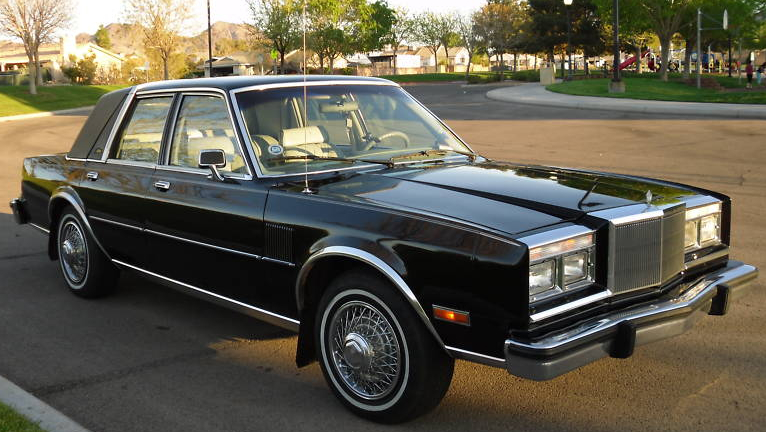
1984 Chrysler New Yorker Fifth Avenue (M-body)

==== Mid-size (K-platform, 1981) ====
For the 1981 model year, Chrysler would adopt a much more radical form of downsizing, replacing the Dodge Aspen and Plymouth Volaré with the Dodge Aries/Plymouth Reliant. Known as the Chrysler K-cars, they were the first front-wheel drive cars developed entirely within the company. In comparison to their predecessors, the K-Cars shed over 28 in (71 cm) of body length, 13 in (33 cm) of wheelbase (at 100 in (250 cm), only about 1 in (2.5 cm) longer than the subcompact Dodge Omni/Plymouth Horizon), and up to 1,200 lb (540 kg) of curb weight (depending on model). Though far smaller than their predecessors in exterior footprint, interior dimensions changed little, with 6-passenger seating remaining intact; the Reliant and Aries were classified as mid-size vehicles by the EPA.

Alongside the Dodge Aries and Plymouth Reliant, over 40 vehicles were derived from the K platform from 1981 to 1995 (not including minivans) in several size segments. Due to its large number of derivatives, Chrysler would replace the K platform in the compact, mid-size, and full-size segments (with the PL, JA, and LH platforms, respectively).

Chrysler downsizing (mid-size K-platform, 1981)

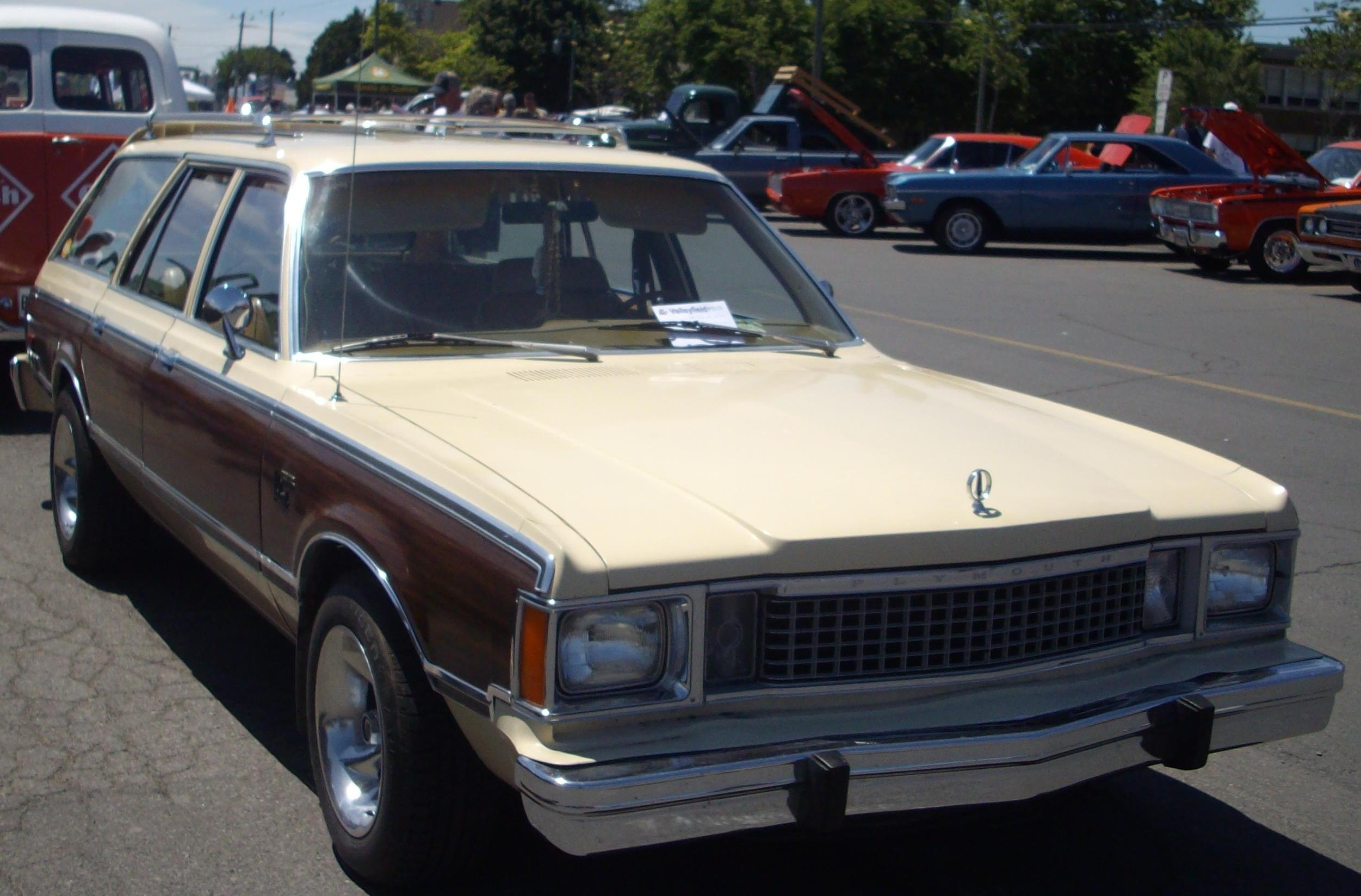
1980 Plymouth Volaré station wagon

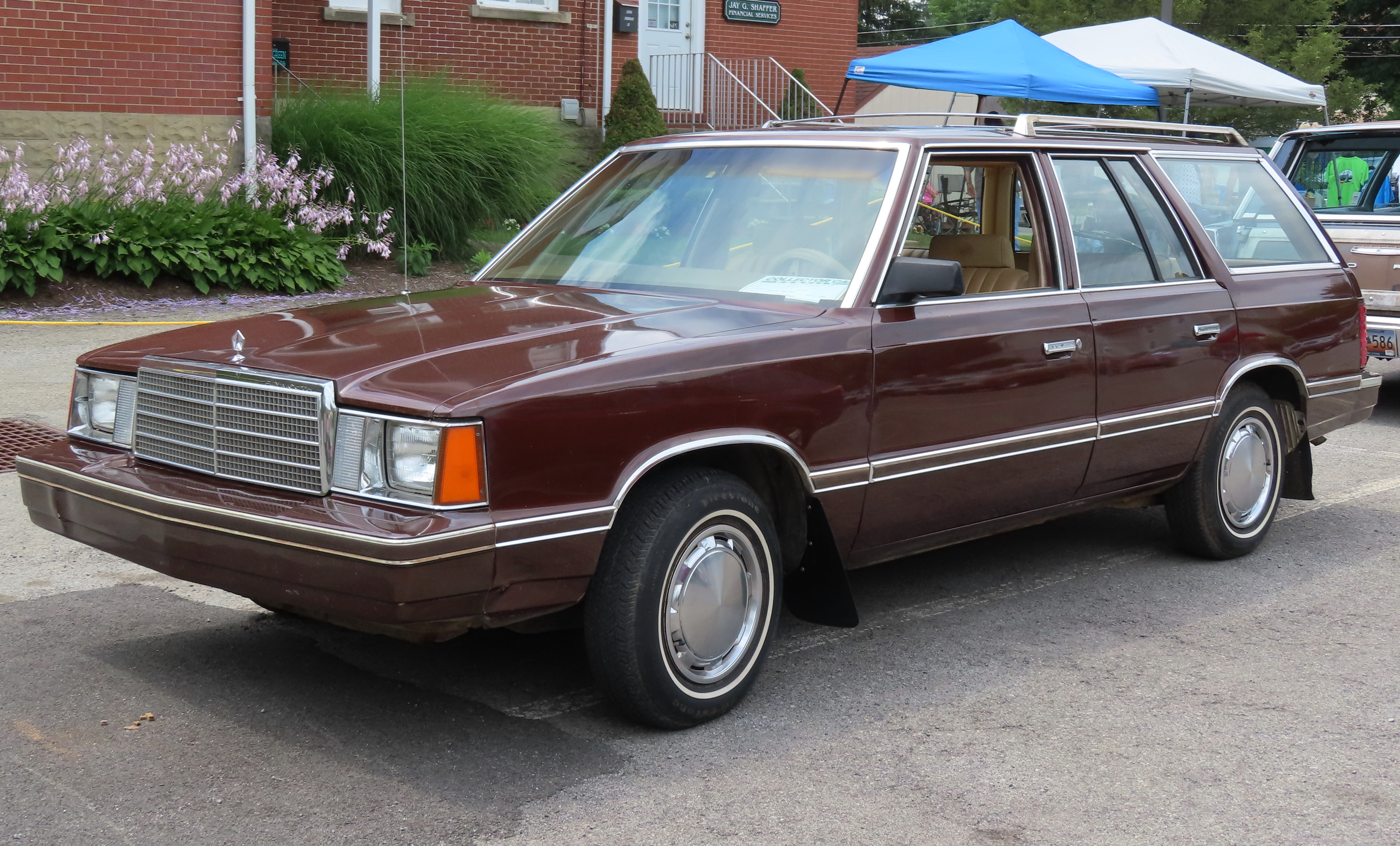
1982 Plymouth Reliant

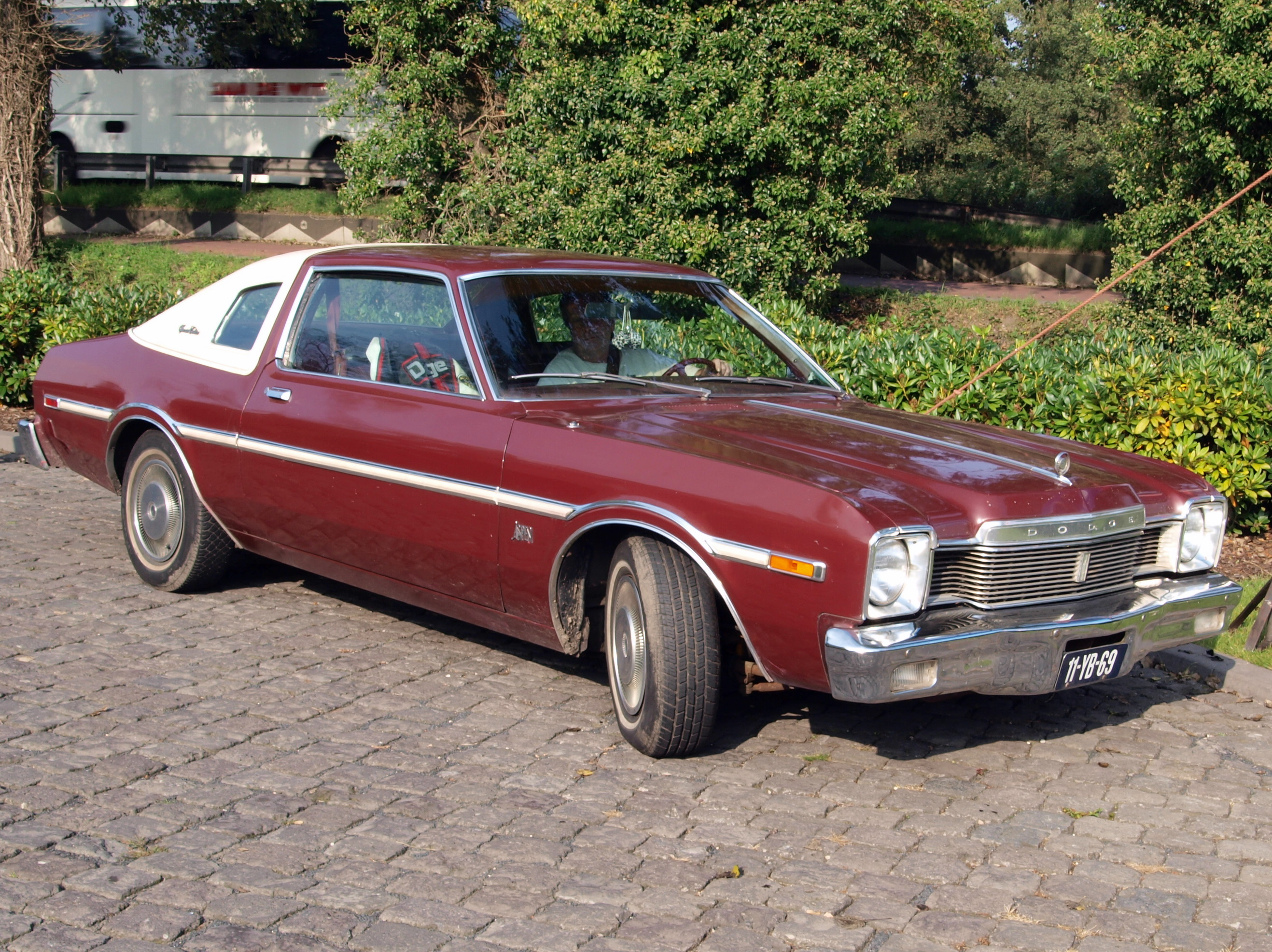
1977 Dodge Aspen

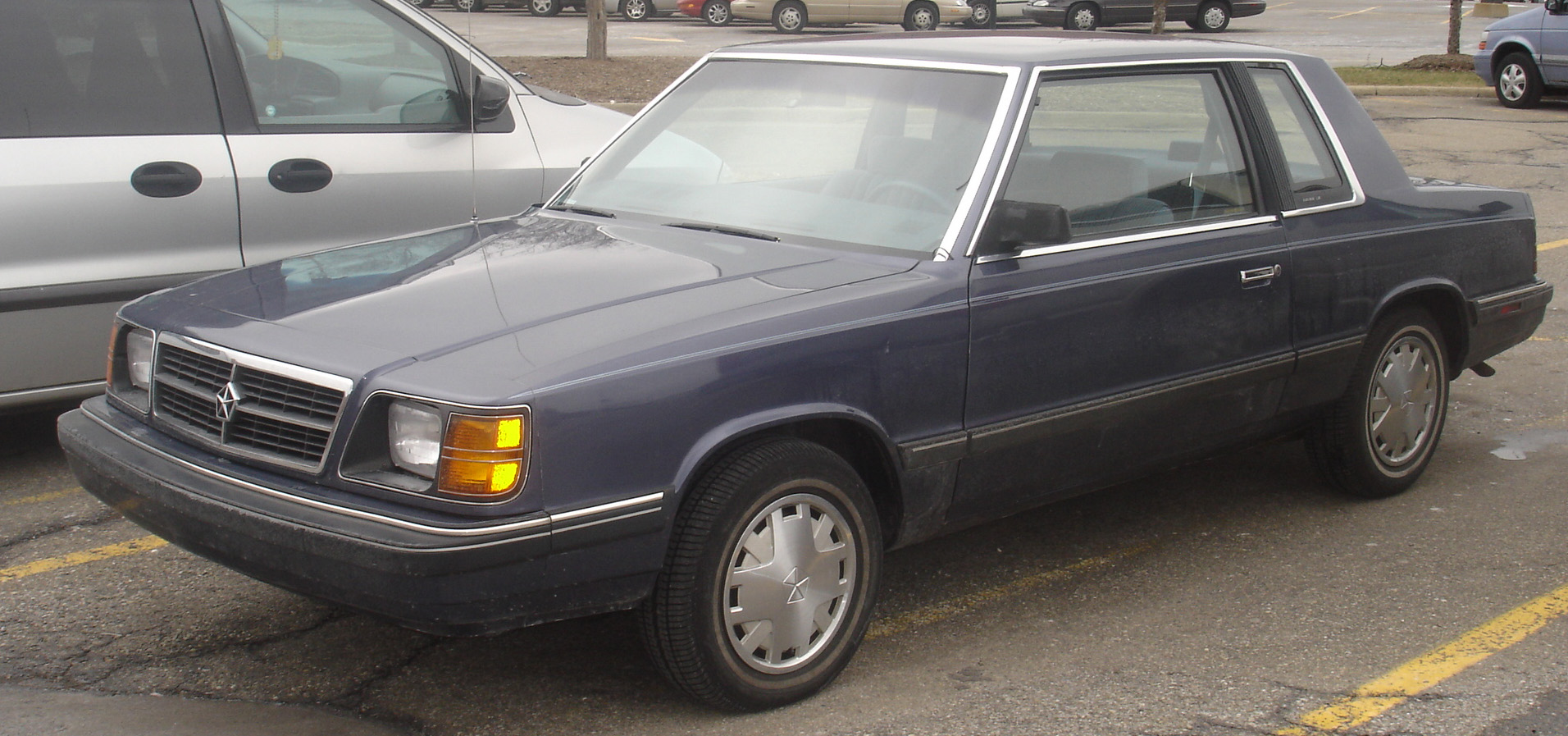
1989 Dodge Aries coupe

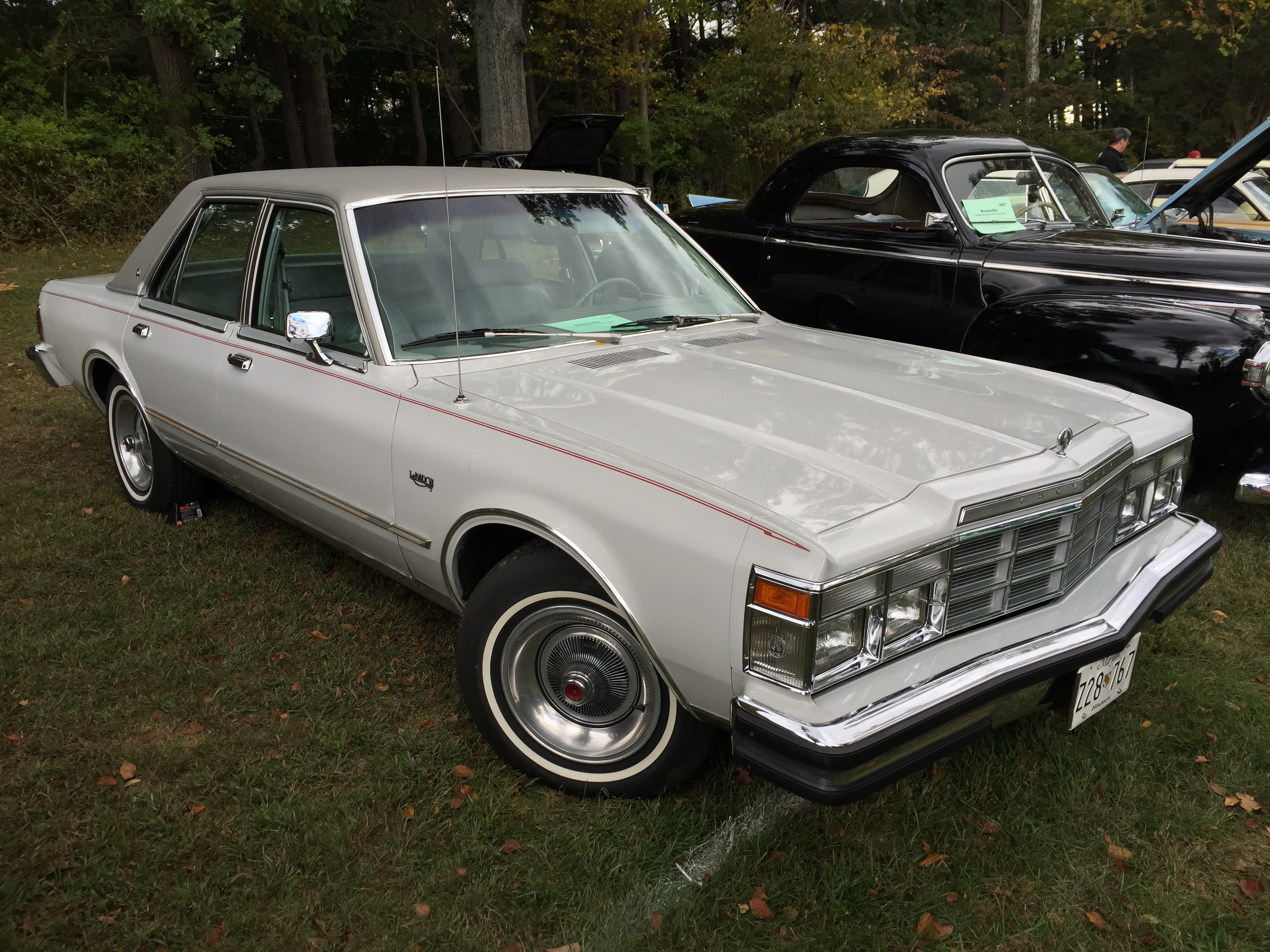
1978 Chrysler LeBaron

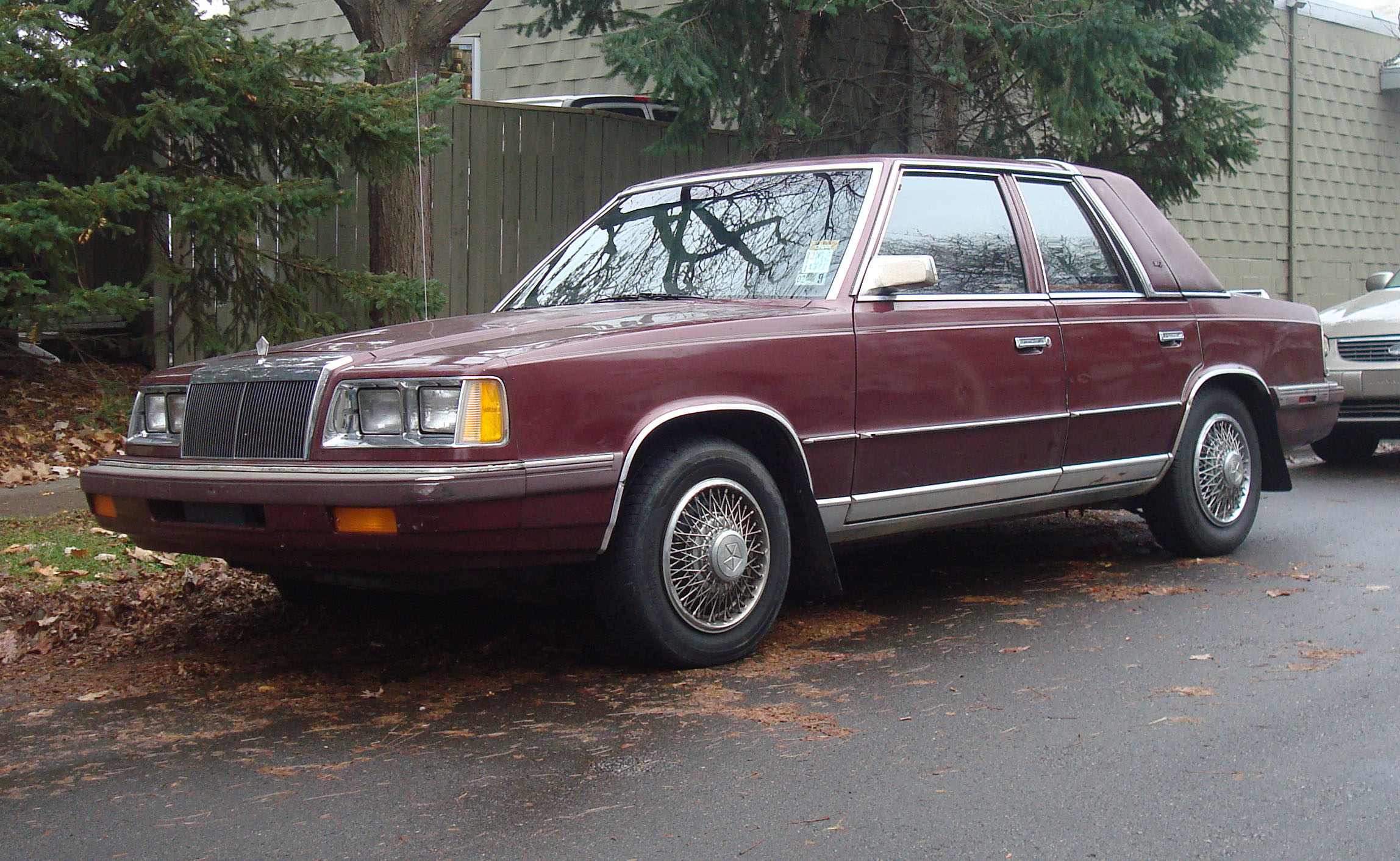
1986–1988 Chrysler LeBaron

==== Minivan (S-platform, 1984) ====
In the 1980s era of downsizing, Chrysler explored alternatives for large family vehicles. After its development at Ford in the 1970s into a running prototype, Lee Iacocca revived minivans at Chrysler as an alternative for full-size and mid-size station wagons, developed alongside the K-cars. Declining sales, along with lack of development funds, led Chrysler to withdraw production of full-size station wagons after the 1978 model year; after 1982, the wagon version of the K-car was the sole station wagon sold by Chrysler.

Introduced in 1984, the Plymouth Voyager and Dodge Caravan were the first minivans to reach production by an American manufacturer. While 3 in (7.6 cm) shorter than the K-cars, the Voyager and Caravan could be configured to hold up to 7 passengers; with seats removed, interior volume closely matched the cargo-carrying capability of a full-size station wagon. While the Dodge Caravan was an all-new nameplate, the introduction of minivans effectively downsized the Plymouth Voyager, previously the counterpart of the Dodge Ram Wagon.

After 1988, Chrysler exited station wagon production entirely until the debut of the LX-platform Dodge Magnum in 2005.

Chrysler downsizing (station wagons, vans to minivans)

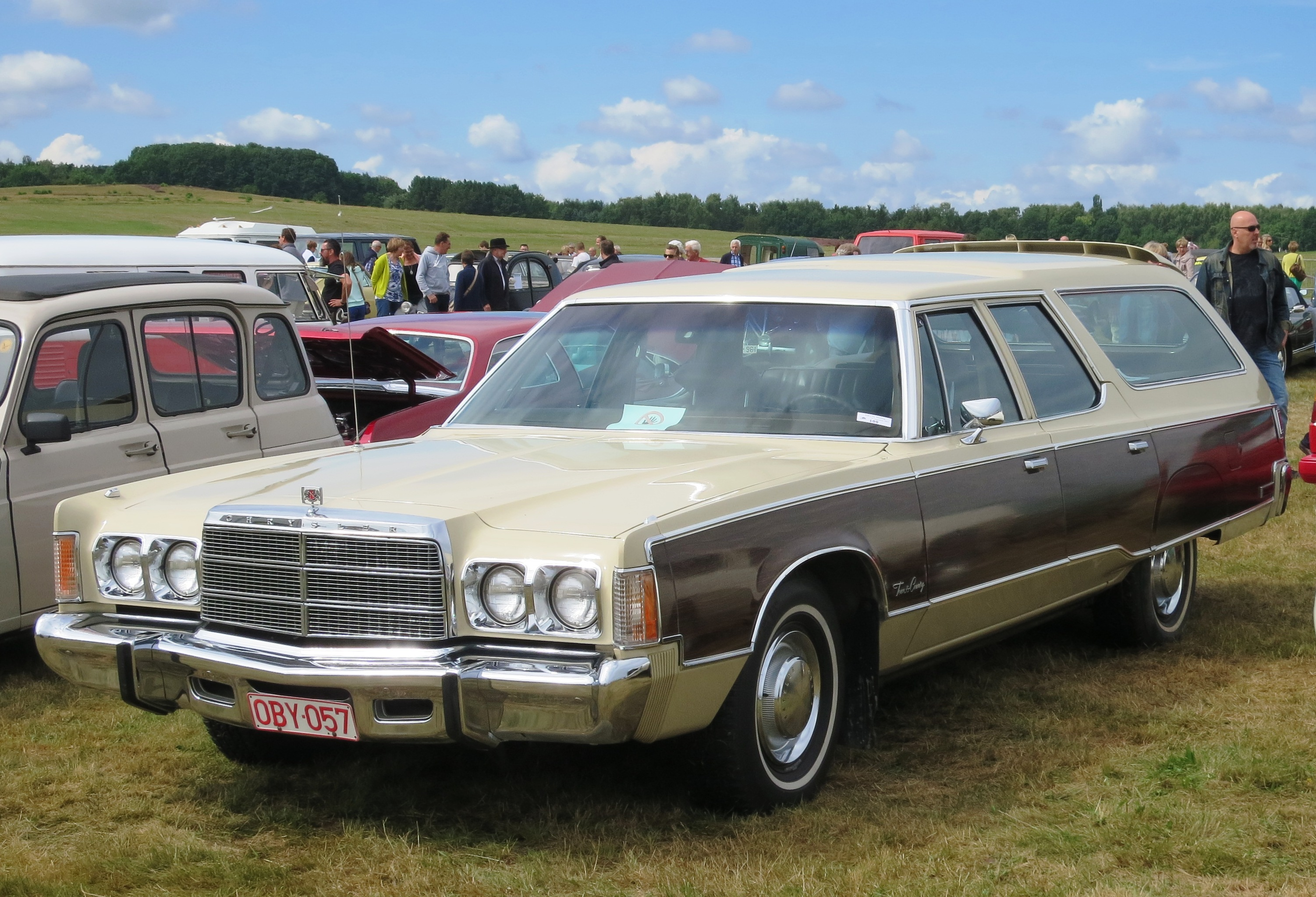
1977 Chrysler Town & Country (C-platform)

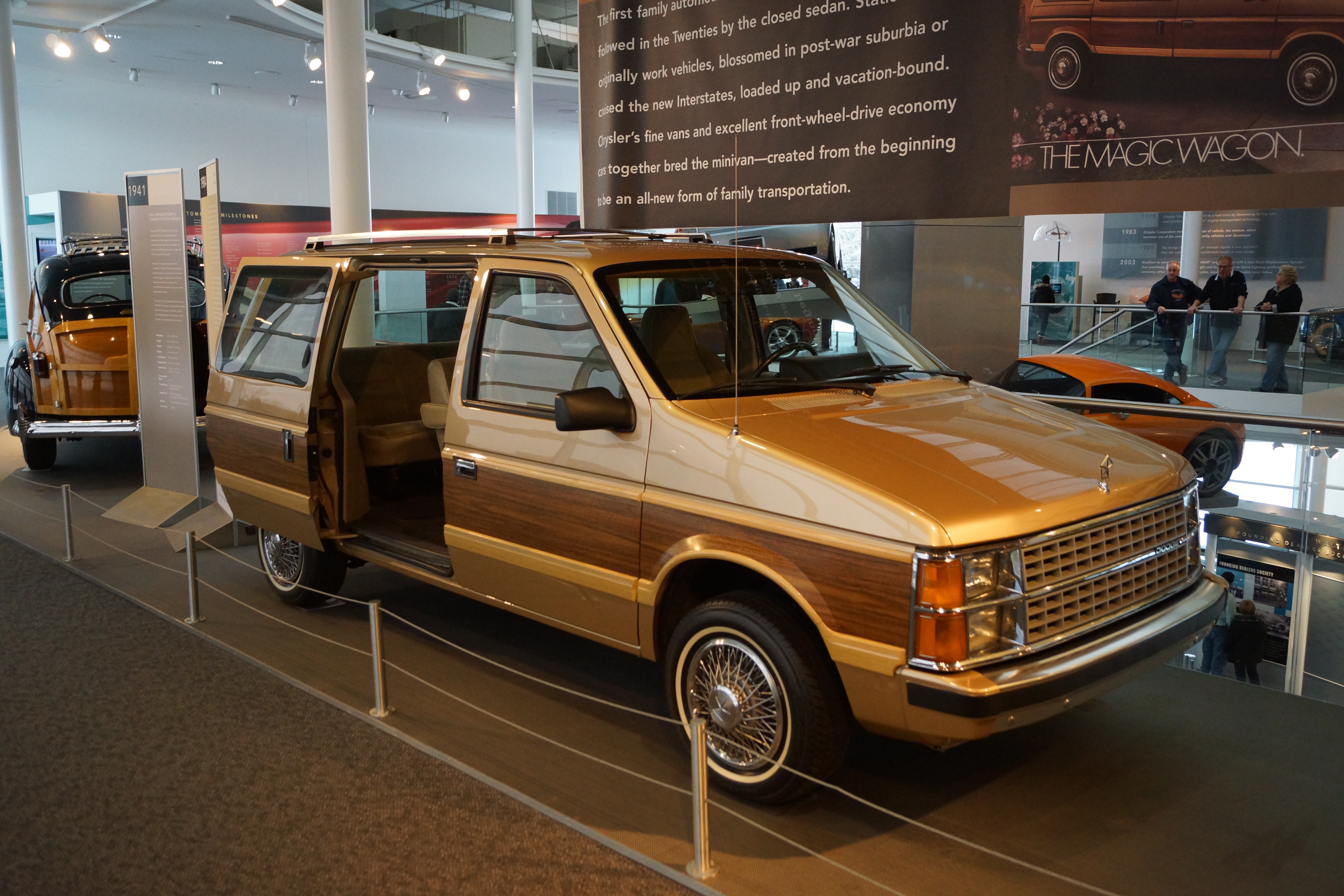
1984 Dodge Caravan LE

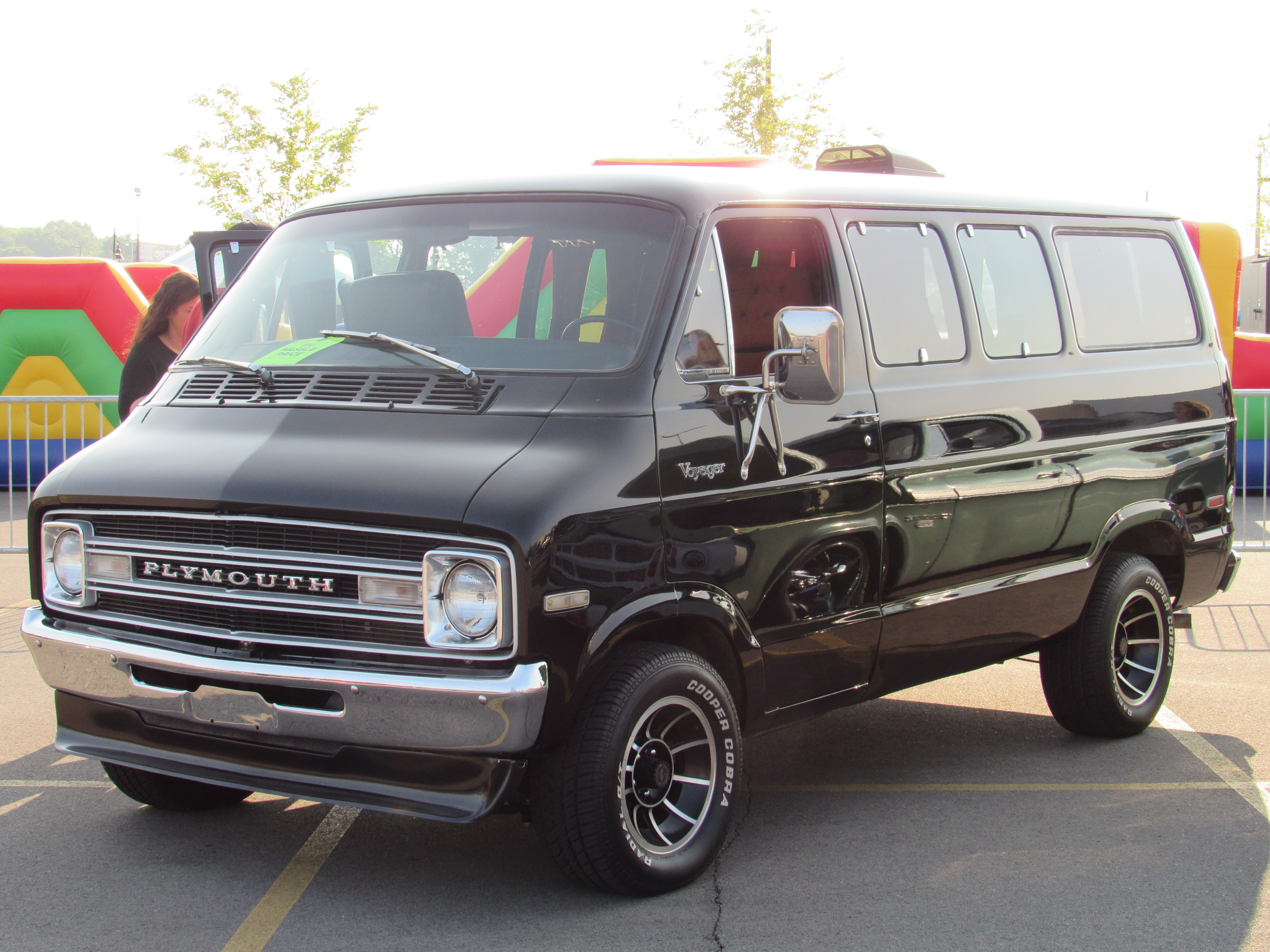
1974–1977 Plymouth Voyager

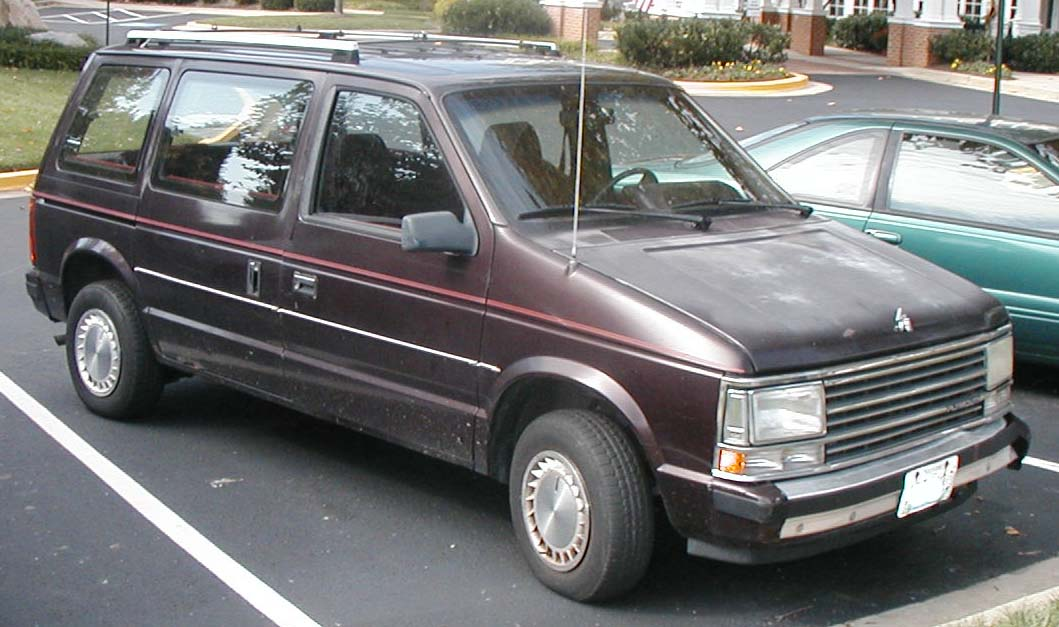
1987–1988 Plymouth Voyager SE

=== Ford ===
Ford Motor Company would become the first American auto manufacturer to introduce downsized model lines, largely as a response to consumer demand. Faced with returning the Lincoln model line to profitability for the 1961 model year, the Lincoln Continental shed nearly 15 inches in length and 8 inches in wheelbase from the previous 1960 models (the largest Ford cars ever made without 5 mph bumpers). The same year, Mercury shifted to a Ford-based chassis for its full-size model range, shedding 6 inches of wheelbase.

==== Initial uses ====
Downsizing (in an effort to improve efficiency) was first phased in as Ford introduced the 1974 Ford Mustang II. Designed before the 1973 fuel crisis, the Mustang II was developed as a response for consumers who felt that the Mustang had grown too large through its various 1960s updates. Shifting from Ford Falcon underpinnings to the Ford Pinto, the 1974 Mustang II shed nearly 14 inches of length and 13 inches of wheelbase from its 1973 counterpart. The smallest model of the Mustang ever, the 1974 Mustang II was 6 inches shorter than the 1964½ debut version.

For 1977, Ford revised the placement of the Ford Thunderbird in its product lineup. In an effort to split the model from the Continental Mark V, the Thunderbird was made the replacement of the slow-selling Ford Elite (becoming a counterpart of the Ford LTD II and Mercury Cougar). Along with eliminating the duplication, the marketing revision produced a smaller and less costly Thunderbird that competed against the quartet of GM A-body personal luxury coupes and the Chrysler Cordoba for the first time.

As a response to the 1977 GM downsizing of its full-size vehicles, Ford showcased the size of its full-size model line (now longer than a Cadillac Fleetwood Brougham) to consumers skeptical of smaller exterior footprints. To more directly compete with the downsized GM offerings, the Ford Torino and Mercury Montego were updated and renamed the Ford LTD II and Mercury Cougar; while matching the GM B-body sedans in exterior footprints, the LTD II/Cougar remained intermediate-segment sedans in terms of interior dimensions.

==== Full-size (Panther, 1979–1980) ====
For the 1979 model year, Ford became the final American manufacturer to introduce downsized full-size product ranges. As a response to the 1977 General Motors B-platform redesign, Ford launched the Panther platform for Ford and Mercury (Lincoln was delayed to 1980). In contrast to 1978, the 1979 Ford LTD and Mercury Marquis lost over 15 in (38 cm) of length and 800 lb (360 kg), giving them a smaller exterior footprint than the "intermediate" Ford LTD II. However, full-size sedans were able retain nearly identical interior dimensions through the redesign. For 1980, the Lincoln Continental (renamed Town Car for 1981) became the final nameplate of American full-size sedans to undergo downsizing; from 1977 to 1979, it was the longest mass-produced car sold in North America.

Ford downsizing (full-size model range)

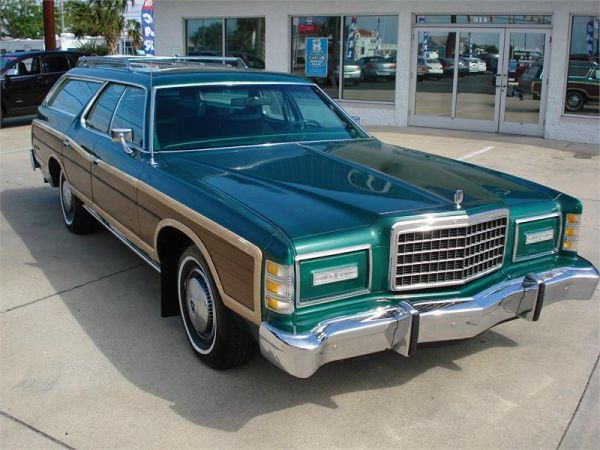
1978 Ford LTD Country Squire (1969 Ford)

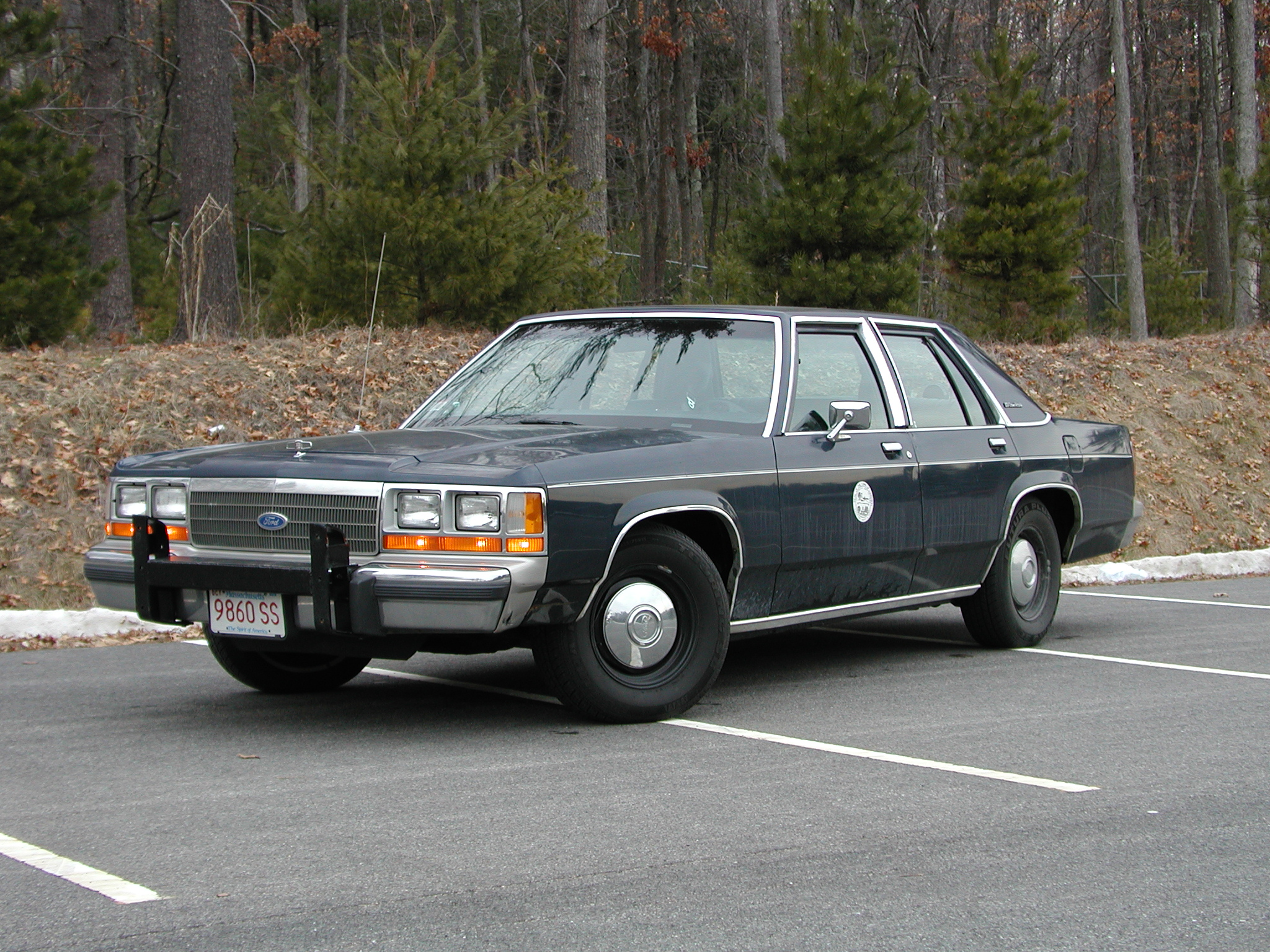
1990 Ford LTD Crown Victoria (Panther platform)

==== Mid-size (Fox, 1980–1981) ====
Following the downsizing of Ford and Lincoln-Mercury full-size product lines, Ford shifted towards downsizing its mid-size product ranges, adapting them to the Ford Fox platform (introduced in 1978, at the large end of the compact size range); the intermediate Ford LTD II was not replaced. For 1980, the Ford Thunderbird and Mercury Cougar XR7 were redesigned, adopting an extended-wheelbase Fox platform. For 1981, the mid-size Ford Granada and Mercury Cougar (previously a counterpart of the intermediate Ford LTD II) were downsized, becoming higher-trim versions of the Ford Fairmont/Mercury Zephyr. While less extensive of a change than with the full-size downsizing, the 1981 Ford Granada shed 3 in (7.6 cm) in length, 4 in (10 cm) in width and wheelbase, and approximately 300 lb (140 kg) of curb weight over its 1980 predecessor.

Ford downsizing (intermediate/mid-size product ranges)

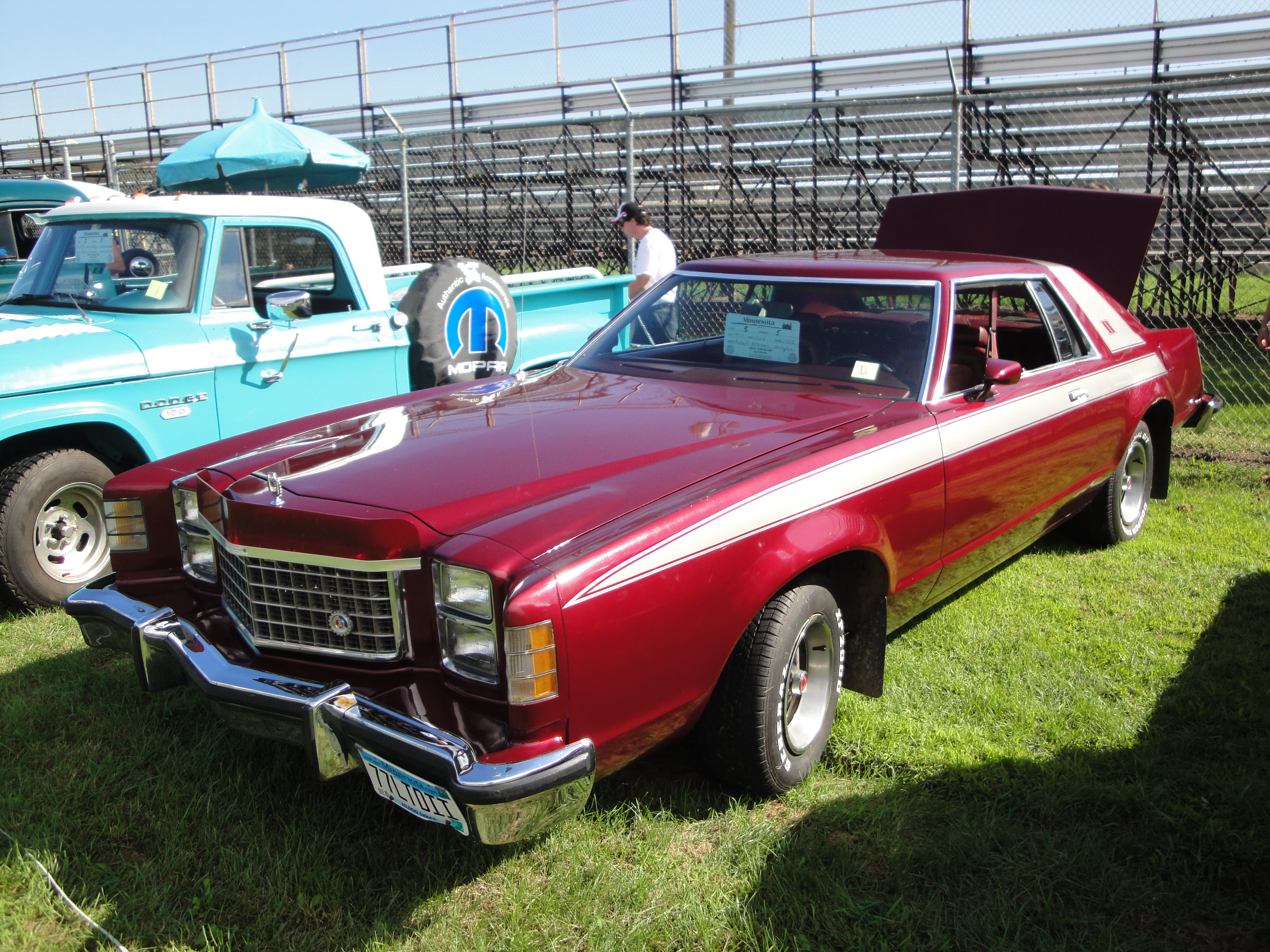
1977 Ford LTD II two-door (Ford Torino platform)

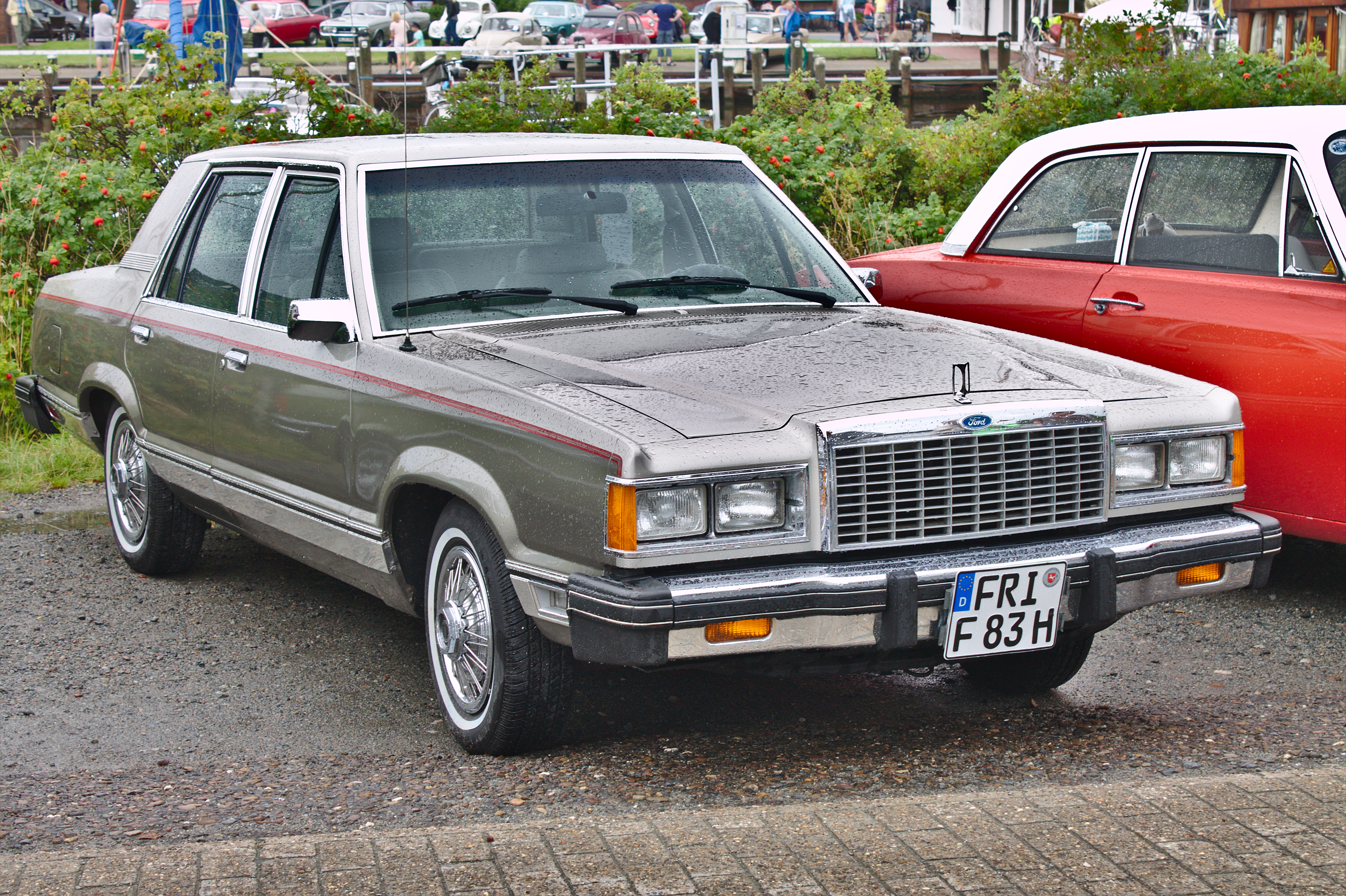
1982 Ford Granada sedan (Fox platform)

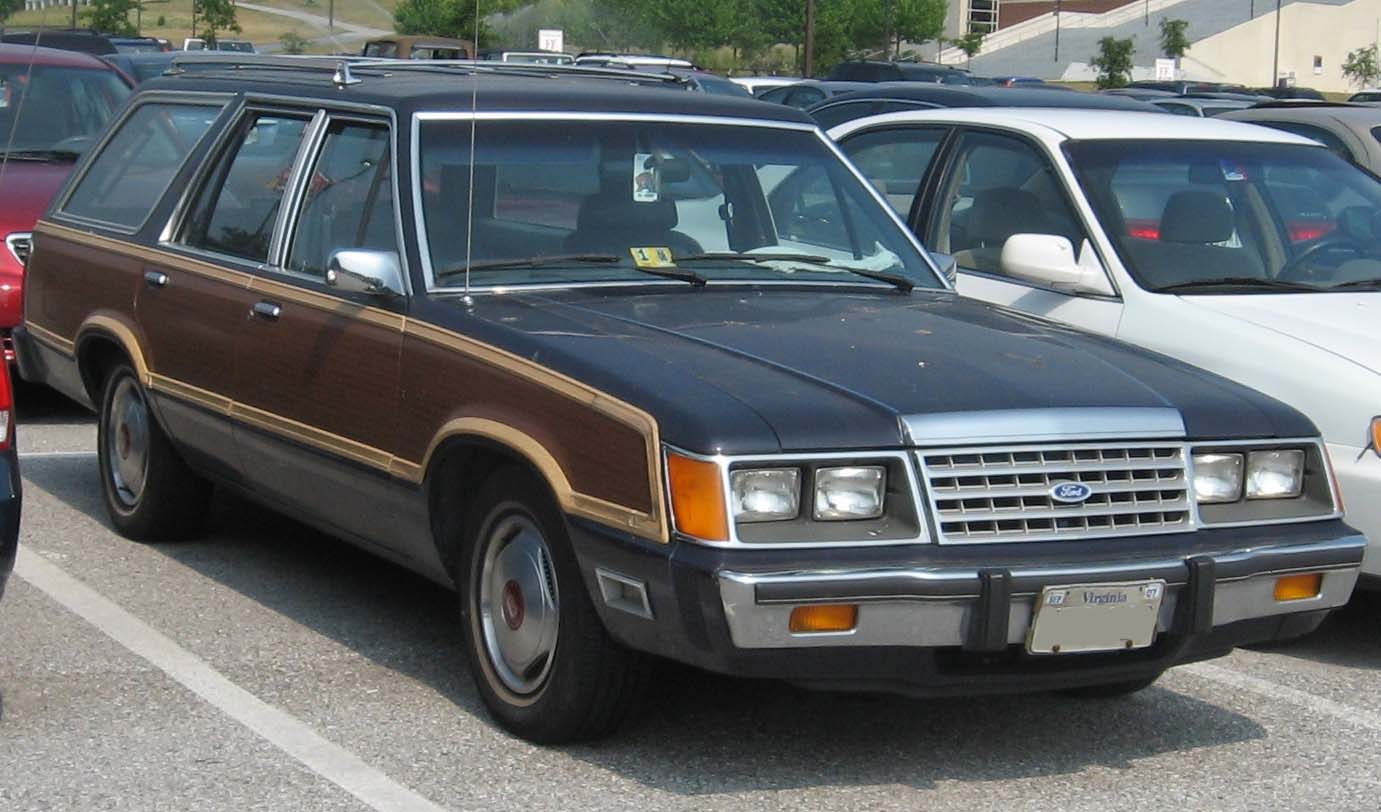
1985–1986 Ford LTD Country Squire station wagon (Fox platform)

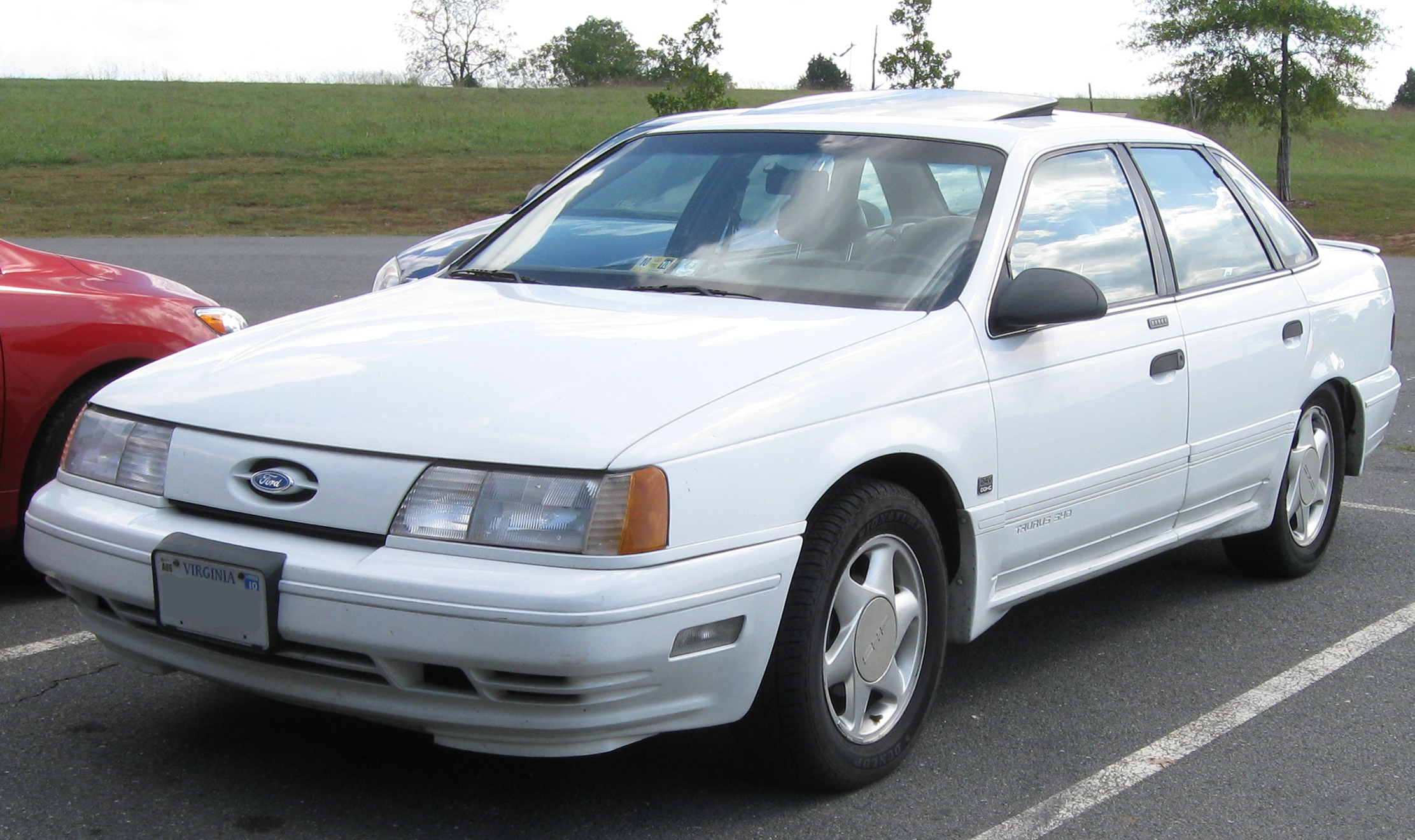
1989–1991 Ford Taurus SHO (D186 platform)

==== Rebadging model ranges (1981–1983) ====
For 1983, the Ford and Lincoln-Mercury mid-size and full-size product ranges underwent further downsizing efforts, through the use of badge engineering. In a decision to continue their production, Ford moved its full-size product lines upmarket under their top-trim nameplates (Ford LTD Crown Victoria and Mercury Grand Marquis). In an effort to bolster sales of its mid-size sedans, following a mid-cycle revision, Fox-platform mid-size sedans adopted the Ford LTD and Mercury Marquis nameplates. To reverse their poor reception in the marketplace, the Ford Thunderbird and Mercury Cougar underwent a complete redesign, with the Cougar returning exclusively to a coupe bodystyle.

To eliminate model duplication within the Lincoln brand, the Lincoln Continental was rebranded the Lincoln Town Car for 1981, with the Lincoln Continental shifting to the mid-size Fox platform; the Panther-based Continental Mark VI was replaced by the Fox-based 1984 Continental Mark VII, sharing its wheelbase with the Lincoln Continental sedan.

Ford downsizing (personal-luxury coupes)

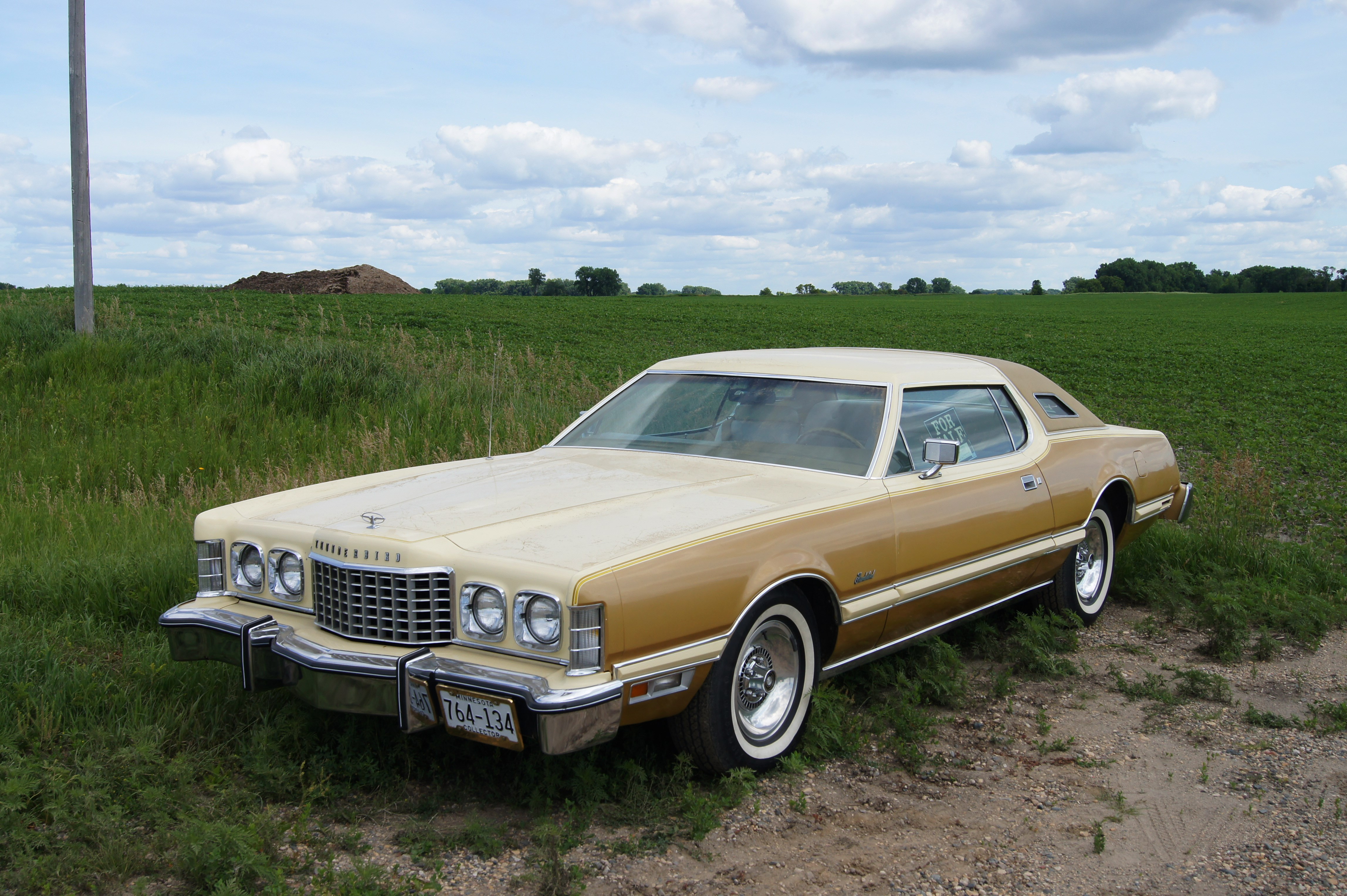
1976 Ford Thunderbird

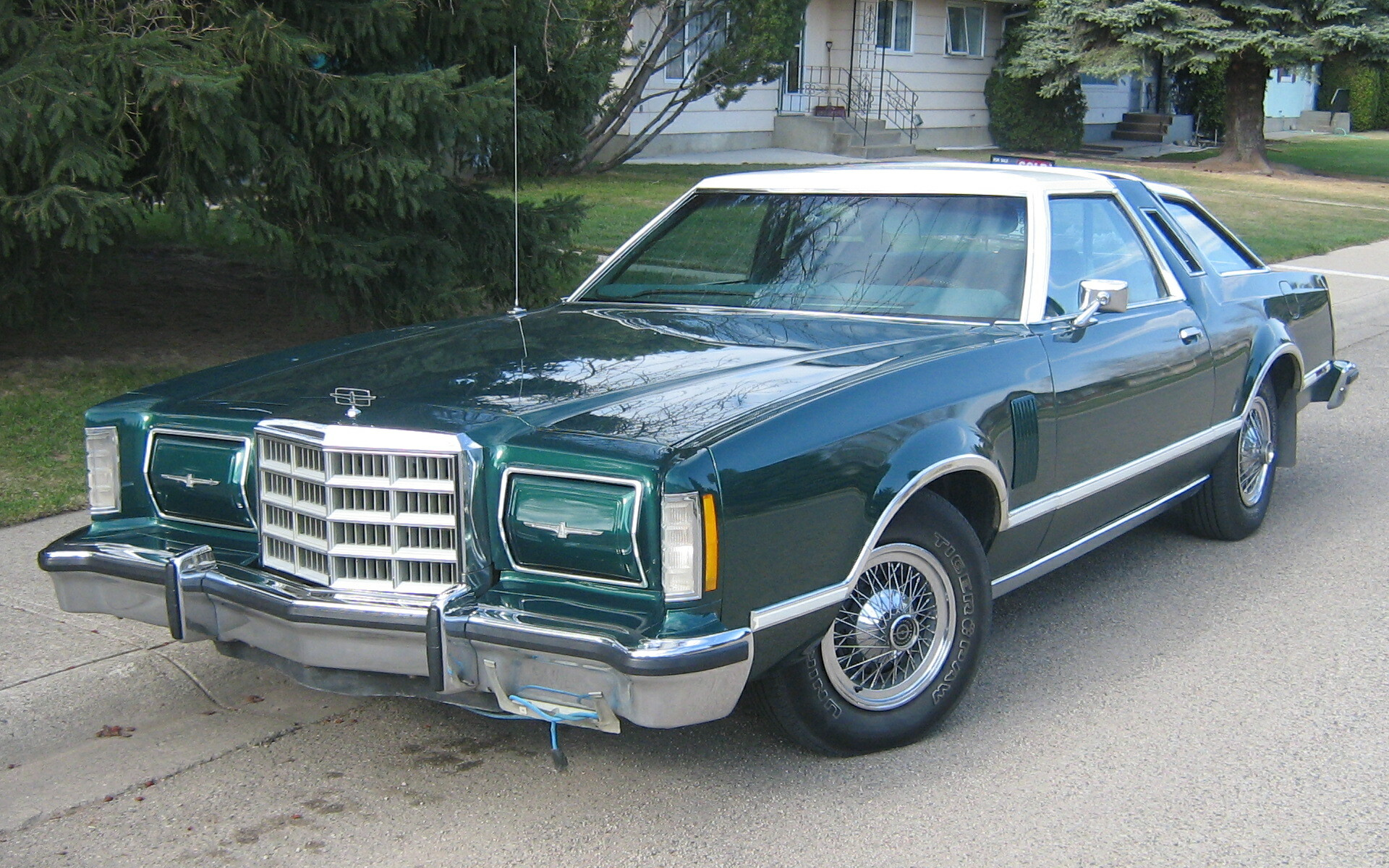
1977 Ford Thunderbird (Ford Torino platform)

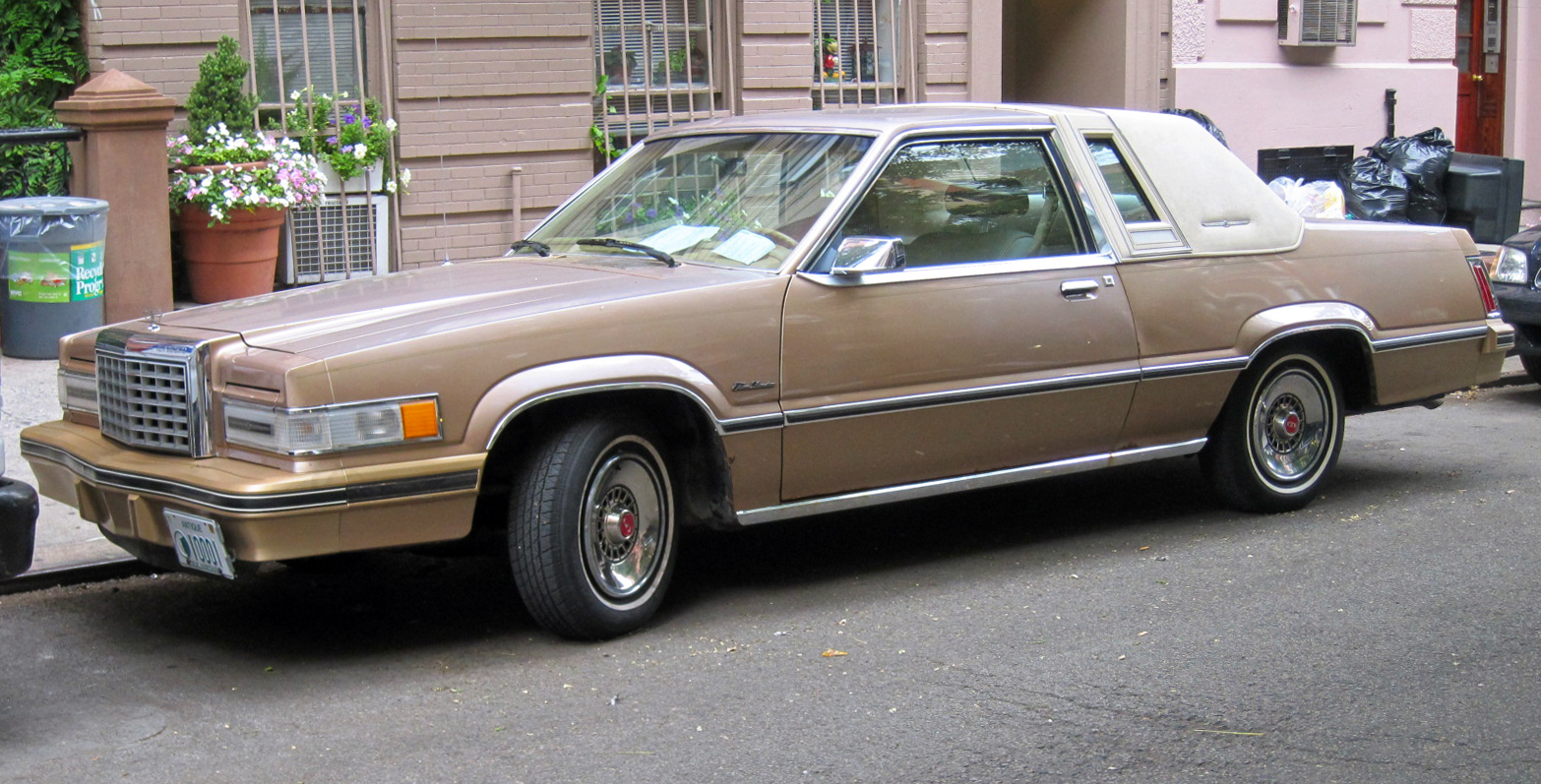
1982 Ford Thunderbird Town Landau (Fox platform LWB)

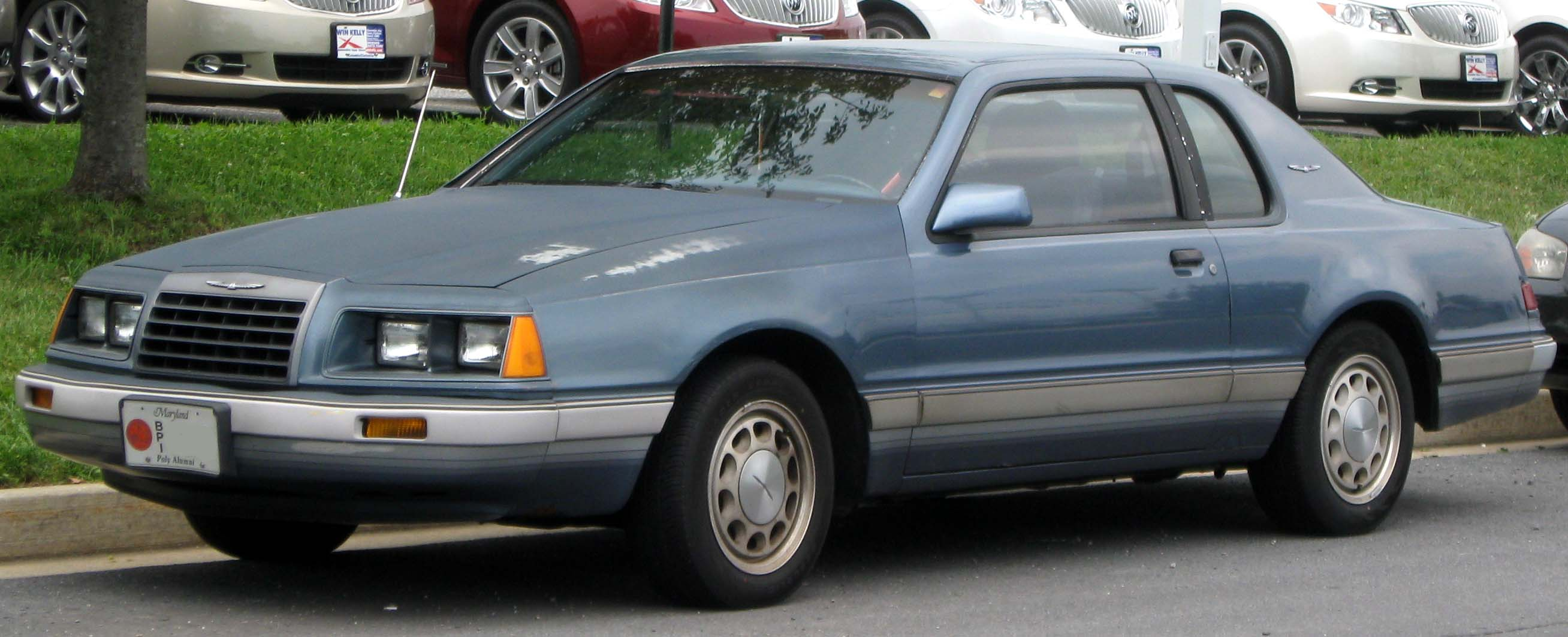
1985–1986 Ford Thunderbird Turbo Coupe (Fox platform)
Ford downsizing (Lincoln Continental downsizing)

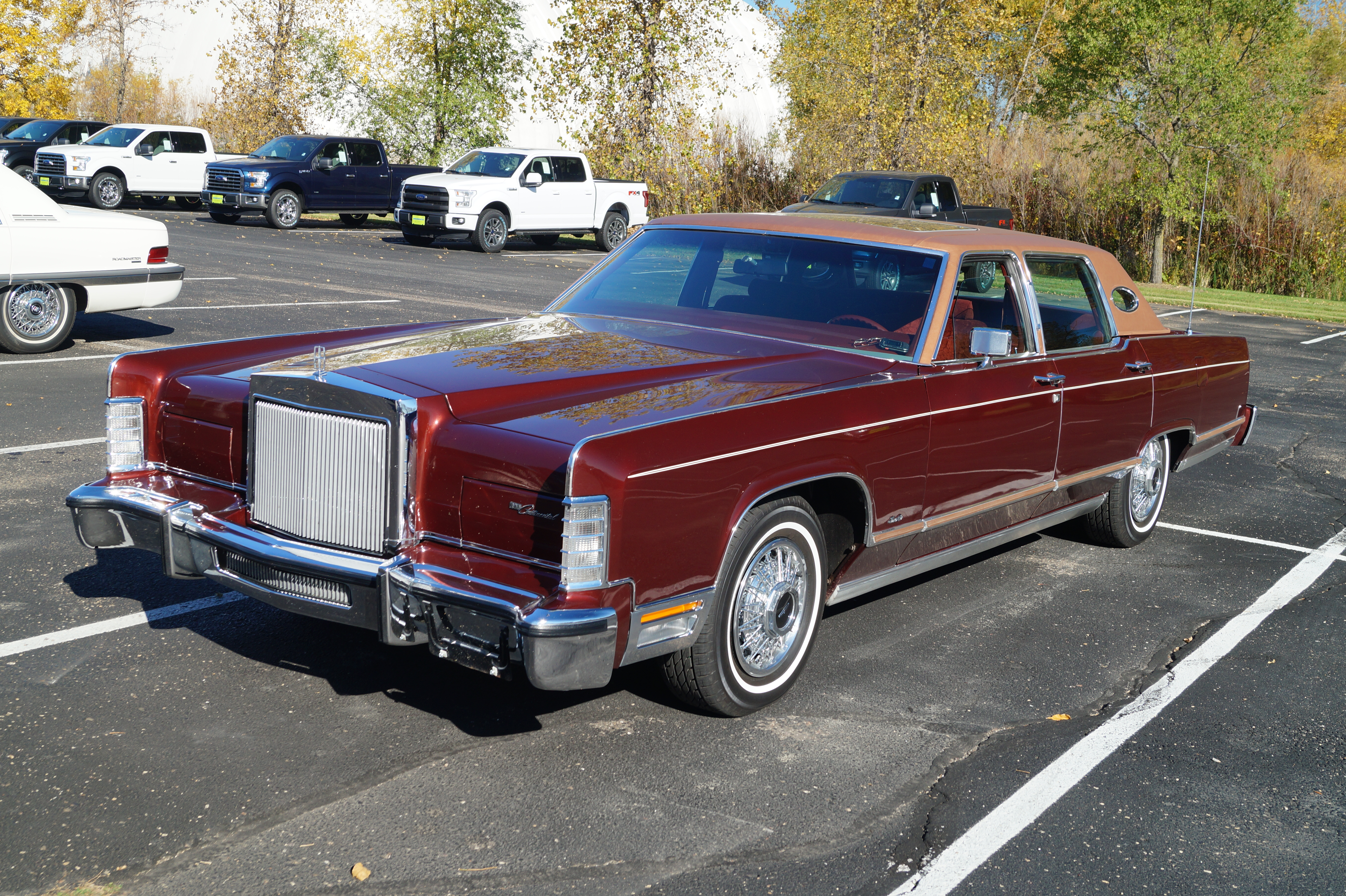
1978 Lincoln Continental Town Car

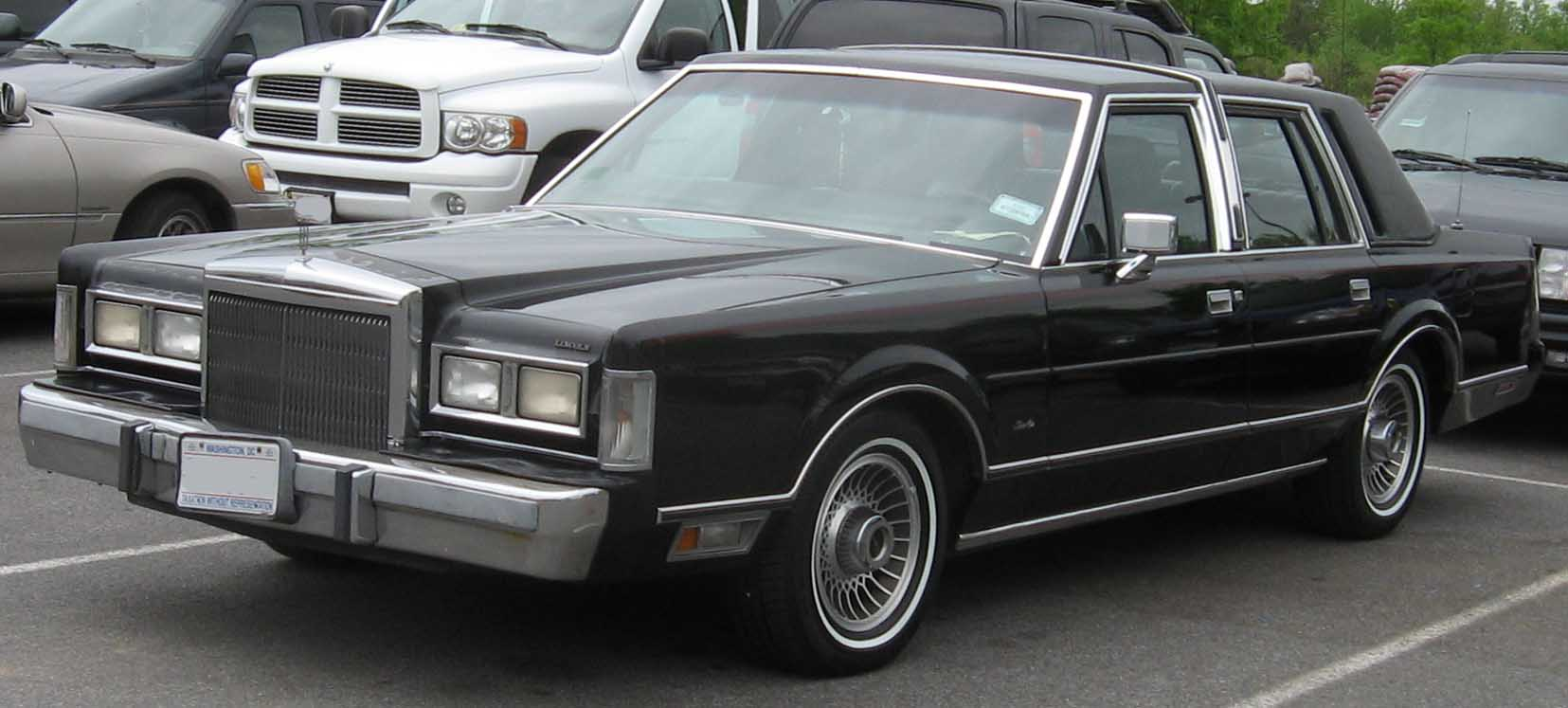
1981–1985 Lincoln Town Car (similar to 1980 Continental)

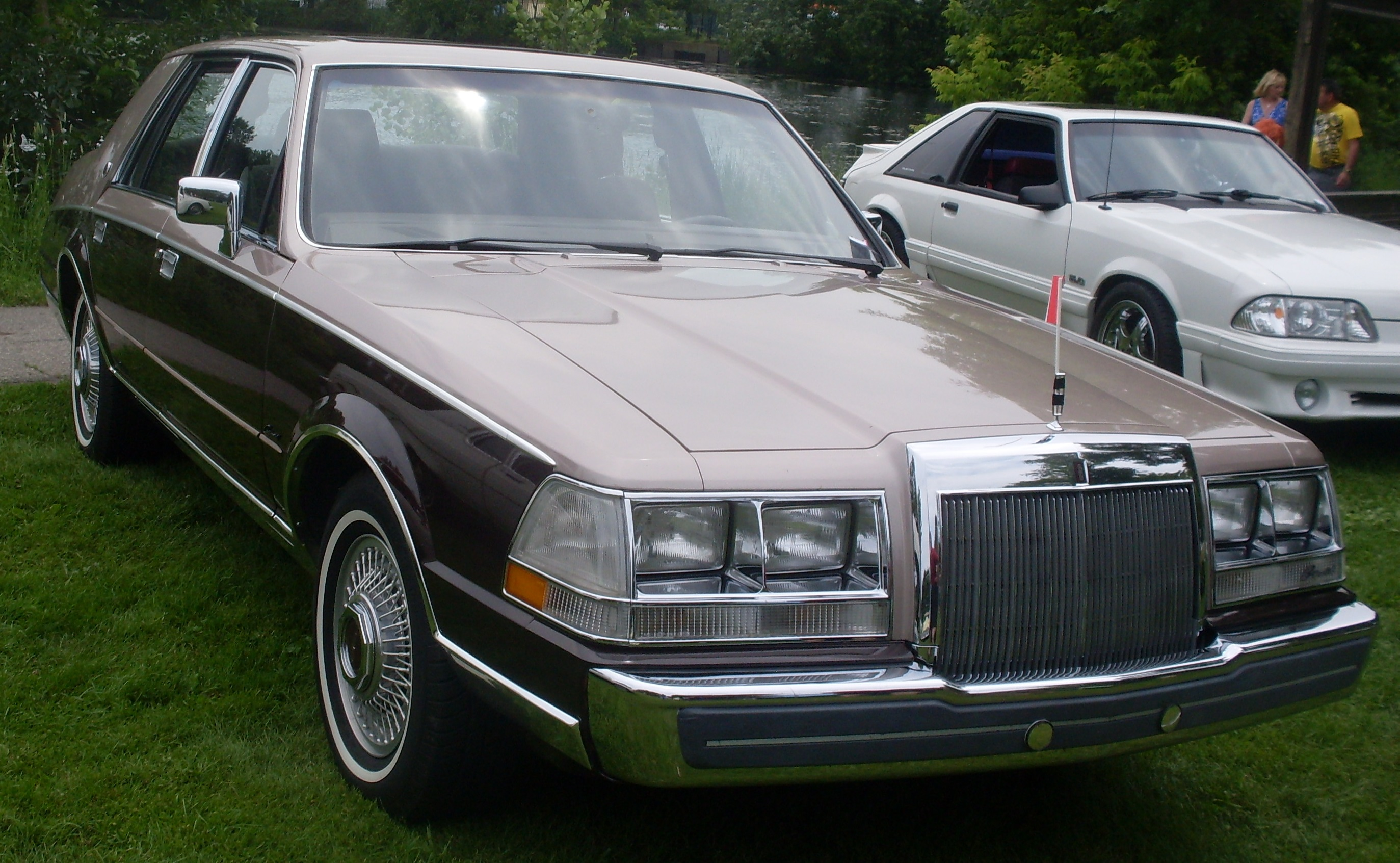
1984–1987 Lincoln Continental

==== Front-wheel drive transition (CE14/D186, 1984–1986) ====
In the shift to front-wheel drive, the Ford Escort replaced the Ford Pinto and Ford Fiesta. Although larger than the Pinto, the Escort was adapted into several other vehicles, including the 1984 Ford Tempo/Mercury Topaz, the replacement for the Fairmont and the Zephyr. For 1986, the Ford Taurus and Mercury Sable were introduced as the front-wheel drive replacement for the Ford LTD and Mercury Marquis. Although sharing nearly an identical wheelbase, the Taurus was 6 in (15 cm) shorter than the LTD. Following the introduction of the Taurus, the use of downsizing through the Ford model line largely stopped. At the end of the Panther-platform model cycle in 2011, none of the vehicles were left with a direct replacement (with the Mercury brand discontinued altogether).
