= Ford Pinto engine =

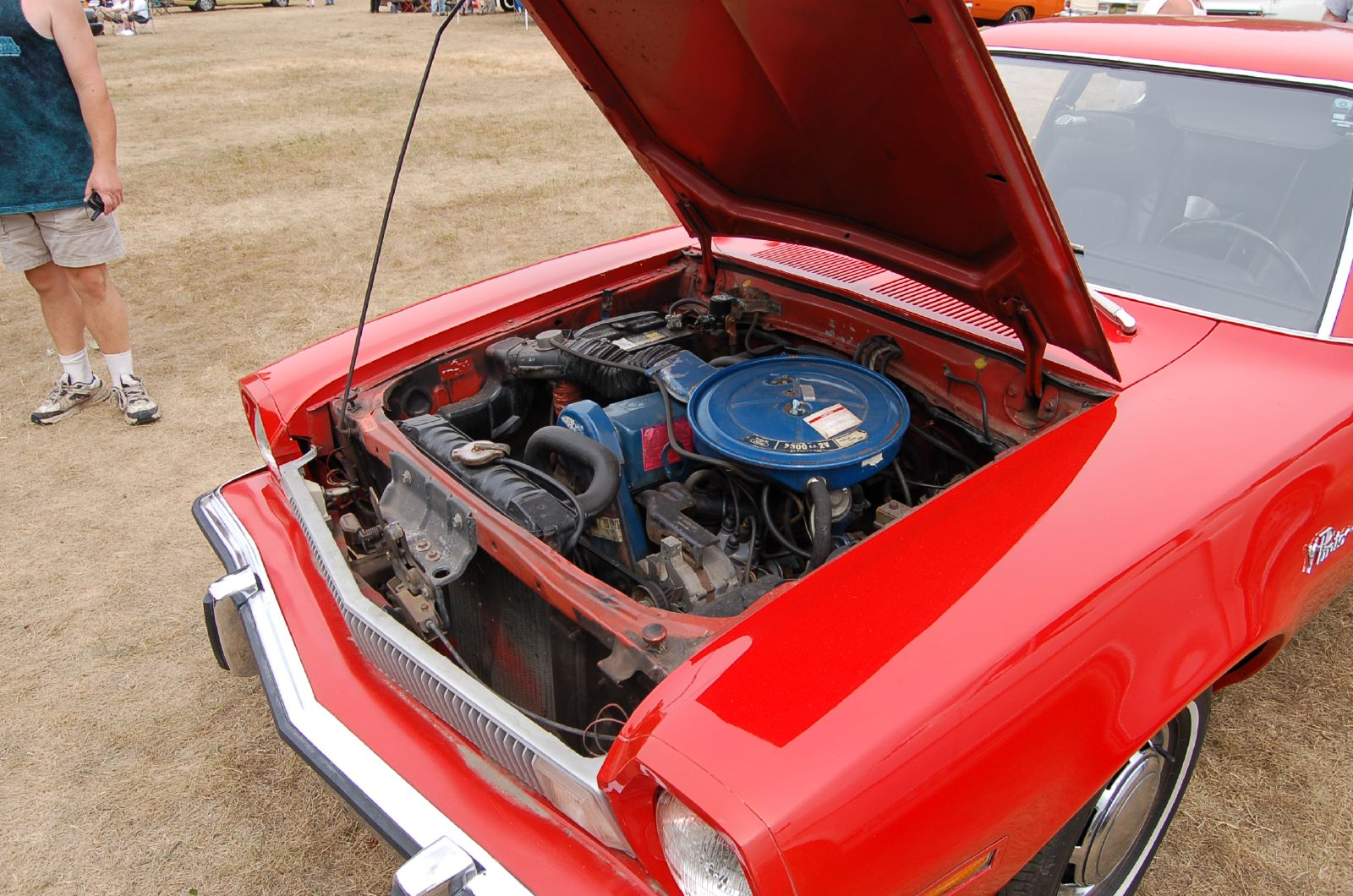

Overview
- Manufacturer: Ford Motor Company
- Also called: EAO/OHC; T88-series; Taunus/Lima in-line
- Production: 1970–2001

Layout
- Configuration: Inline-4
- Displacement: 1.3–2.5 L (1,294–2,504 cc)
- Cylinder bore: 79 mm (3.11 in); 81 mm (3.19 in); 86.2 mm (3.39 in); 87.7 mm (3.45 in); 89.3 mm (3.52 in); 90.82 mm (3.58 in); 96.04 mm (3.78 in)
- Piston stroke: 66 mm (2.6 in); 76.2 mm (3.00 in); 76.95 mm (3.030 in); 79.4 mm (3.13 in); 86.4 mm (3.40 in)
- Cylinder block material: Cast Iron
- Cylinder head material: Cast Iron
- Valvetrain: SOHC 2 valves x cyl.
- Compression ratio: 8.0:1–9.5:1

Combustion
- Turbocharger: Garrett with intercooler (on some versions)
- Fuel system: Pierburg, Motorcraft or Weber carburetors Fuel injection
- Management: Bosch L-Jetronic (on some versions)
- Fuel type: Gasoline or Autogas (on some 2.3L versions)
- Oil system: Wet sump
- Cooling system: Water-cooled

Output
- Power output: 54–205 hp (40–153 kW)
- Torque output: 90–240 N⋅m (66–177 lb⋅ft)

Chronology
- Predecessor: Essex V4/Taunus V4 engine

The Ford Pinto engine was the unofficial name for a four-cylinder internal combustion engine built by Ford Europe. In Ford sales literature, it was referred to as the EAO or OHC engine. Because it was designed to the metric system, it was sometimes called the "metric engine". The internal Ford codename for the unit was the T88-series engine. European Ford service literature refers to it as the Taunus In-Line engine (hence the TL codenames). In North America it was known as the Lima In-Line (LL), or simply the Lima engine due to its being manufactured at Lima Engine in Lima, Ohio.

It was used in many European Ford cars and was exported to the United States to be used in the Ford Pinto, a successful subcompact car of the 1970s, hence the name which is used most often for the unit. In Britain, it is commonly used in many kit cars and hot rods, especially in the 2-litre size.

== Pinto OHC (TL) ==
In Europe, the Pinto OHC was introduced in 1970 to replace the Essex V4 used in the Corsair as that range was subsumed into the Mk3 Cortina and Taunus V4 for the German Fords range (mainly the new Taunus TC). It was the first Ford engine to feature a belt-driven overhead camshaft. Early Pinto engines suffered from excessive cam and follower wear, this was later addressed by nitriding the cam lobes and followers, and the fitment of a spray bar, which sprayed oil directly at the camshaft. All standard production Pinto engines had a cast iron cylinder block and a cast iron, crossflow, single overhead camshaft cylinder head with two valves per cylinder operated by finger followers.

Applications:

- Ford Taunus/Ford Cortina (TC1 (1970-76), TC2 (1976–82))
- Ford Escort Mk1 RS2000
- Ford Escort Mk2 RS2000, Mexico
- Ford Capri (Mk2 and Mk3 (1974–86))
- Ford Sierra (1982–1992)
- Ford Granada Mk1 and Mk2 (Mk1 (1974–77); Mk2 (1977–85))
- Ford Scorpio/Granada Mk3
- Ford Transit (1978–1994)
- TVR Tasmin 200

The Pinto engine was available in five displacements: 1.3 L (1,294 cc), earlier 1.6 L (1,593 cc), later 1.6 L (1,598 cc), 1.8 L (1,796 cc) and the 2.0 L (1,993 cc). Later 2.0 L (1,998 cc). Due to emission requirements, it was phased out towards the end of the 1980s to be replaced by the CVH engine and DOHC engine, the latter being a completely new design and not a twin-cam development of the Pinto unit. The only DOHC direct derivative of Pinto engine is the Cosworth YB 16-valve engine, powering Ford Sierra and Ford Escort RS Cosworth variants and featuring a cast aluminium alloy cylinder head developed specially by Cosworth fitted to a modified Pinto cast iron block.

The final Pinto engines used in Ford of Europe production vehicles were the 1.6 L (1,598 cc) litre versions used in the Sierra until 1992, and the last 2.0 L (1,998 cc) units were used in the Transit until 1994.

=== 1.3 (TL13) ===
The smallest member of the family was the 1.3 L (1,294 cc) which had a 79 mm × 66 mm (3.11 in × 2.60 in) bore and stroke. It was produced in two compression ratio versions:

- TL13L – the low compression (LC) variant, which developed 40–43 kW (54–58 hp) / 90–92 N⋅m (66–68 lb⋅ft) depending on carburetor model, had a compression ratio of 8.0:1 and the engine codes started with 'JA'
- TL13H — the high compression (HC) variant, which developed 43–46 kW (58–62 hp) / 97–98 N⋅m (72–72 lb⋅ft) depending on carburetor model had a compression ratio of 9.0:1 and the engine codes started with 'JC'

The fuel was supplied by the Motorcraft single-barrel (1V) carburetor in the early models (until April 1979), and Motorcraft VV ("variable venturi") carburetor for the vehicles built after April 1979.

Applications:

- 1970–1982 Ford Taunus (engine codes JAA/JCA, JAC/JCC, JAR/JCR)
- 1972–1974 Ford Capri (engine code JCE)
- 1982–1984 Ford Sierra (engine code JCT)

=== 1.6 (TL16) ===
==== Early low compression variant (TL16L) ====
Initially, the 1.6 L (1,593 cc) had a bore of 87.7 mm (3.45 in) and shared the crankshaft with the 1.3 L model with a stroke of 66 mm (2.60 in) giving the displacement of 1.6 L (1,593 cc). The TL16L had a compression ratio of 8.2:1 and developed 48–51 kW (64–68 hp) of power and 111–113 N⋅m (82–83 lb⋅ft) of torque depending on the carburetor and application. As the 1.3 L model, it used the Motorcraft 1V and, later, the Motorcraft VV carburetors. The engine code of the low compression variant started with 'LA'.

Applications:

- 1970–1982 Ford Taunus / Ford Cortina (engine codes LAA, LAD, LAR)
- 1979–1986 Ford Transit (engine code LAT)
- 1975–1985 Ford Capri (engine codes LAC, LAN)

==== Early high compression variant (TL16H) ====
The HC version of the early 1.6 L (1,593 cc) had the same bore and stroke as the LC version, but the compression ratio was higher (9.2:1), allowing it to produce 53 kW (71 hp) of power and 118 N⋅m (87 lb⋅ft) of torque. It used the same carburetor models as the low compression version (Motorcraft 1V and Motorcraft VV).

Applications:

- 1970–1982 Ford Taunus / Ford Cortina (engine codes LCA, LCJ, LCR)
- 1982–1992 Ford Sierra (engine codes LCT, LCS)
- 1975–1985 Ford Capri (engine codes LCE, LCN)
- 1981–1985 Ford Granada (engine code LCK)
- 1983–1984 Anadol A8-16 SL

==== Increased performance (GT) variant (TL16G) ====
From the beginning of the production run, the 1.6 L (1,593 cc) had a special, 'sporty' version which featured:

- modified cylinder head (larger inlet valves and 2.0 L camshaft with higher valve lifts)
- DGAV 32/36 Weber carburetor
- tubular exhaust manifold

With such an improvement package, the engine produced 66 kW (89 hp) of power and 125 N⋅m (92 lb⋅ft) of torque.

Applications:

- 1970–1973 Ford Taunus GT (engine code LEA)
- 1970–1976 Ford Taunus GXL (engine code LEA)
- 1970-1976 Ford Cortina GT (engine code LEA)
- 1970–1976 Ford Cortina GXL (engine code LEA)
- 1976–1982 Ford Taunus / Ford Cortina S / GLS / Ghia S (engine codes LEC, LEE)
- 1975–1978 Ford Escort Mexico
- 1972–1976 Ford Capri GT (engine codes LEC, LEE)

==== Late variant (TL16E) ====
At the beginning of 1984, Ford Pinto engine displacement range switched from 1.3/1.6/2.0 to 1.6/1.8/2.0. The newly introduced 1.8 L engine used the 2.0 L crankshaft, so to uniform engine parts for the whole range after dropping the 1.3 L — the 1.6 L was redesigned to also take the 2.0 L crankshaft which had a 76.95 mm (3.030 in) stroke. This of course led to bringing the bore down to 3.19 in (81 mm) to keep the displacement within range — it was now 1.6 L (1,598 cc). The TL16E became now the only available 1.6 L engine of the Pinto range. Although the compression ratio was raised to 9.5:1, the power figures did not differ much from the earlier TL16H version — the engine developed 56 kW (75 hp) of power and 123 N⋅m (91 lb⋅ft) of torque. This engine is sometimes referred to as 1.6 E-Max engine.

Applications:

- 1984–1989 Ford Sierra (engine codes LSE, LSD)

=== 1.8 (TL18H) ===
The 1.8 L (1,798 cc) Pinto engine was introduced in 1984 as a replacement for the "old" 1.6 L. The engine had an 86.2 mm (3.39 in) bore and 76.95 mm (3.03 in) stroke giving the displacement of 1.8 L (1,796 cc). Output was 66 kW (89 hp) of power and 140 N⋅m (103 lb⋅ft). Fuel was supplied by the Pierburg 2E3 28/32 carburetor.

Applications:

- 1984–1989 Ford Sierra (engine codes REB, RED, REF)
- 1985–1992 Ford Scorpio (engine code REC)

=== 2.0 (TL20) ===
The 2.0 L (1,993 cc) was used in many Ford vehicles from the early 1970s. Due to its robustness and high tuning potential, it was often used as an aftermarket engine upgrade or base for building race and rally engines — not exclusively in Ford cars. The engine has bore of 90.8 mm (3.57 in) and 77 mm (3.03 in) stroke giving the displacement of 2.0 L (1,993 cc). It was manufactured in several variants:

==== Low compression variant (TL20L) ====
Three completely different LC variants of the 2.0 L were produced. One was used on the 1970–1982 Ford Taunus export version to Sweden — fitted with the Weber DGAV 32/32 carburetor and compression ratio lowered to 8.2:1 to meet the rigorous emission specifications; it delivered 64 kW (86 hp) of power and 140 N⋅m (103 lb⋅ft) of torque. The second one was used on 1978–1991 Ford Transits and P100 models. With modified induction and Motorcraft 1V carburetor, it produced 57 kW (76 hp) of power and 156 N⋅m (115 lb⋅ft) of torque available at only 2800 rpm. The compression ratio in this case was also 8.2:1. The Transits also used the third variant called the "Economy" engine. The power figure of this one was even lower — it developed only 43 kW (58 hp).

Applications:

- 1970–1982 Ford Taunus Sweden export version (engine code NA)
- 1978–1994 Ford Transit (engine codes NAT, NAV, NAW, NAX, NBA)
- 1988–1993 Ford P100 (engine code NAE)
- 1977–1986 Ford Transit "Economy" version (engine code NUT)

==== Standard (high compression) variant (TL20H) ====
Although Ford marked its standard 2.0 L engine as HC, it actually uses engine codes meant for the 'increased performance variant' engines (coding starting with 'NE'), these have a compression ratio of to 9.2:1. This engine used different carburetor models across the years:

- Weber DGAV 32/36 - on all cars up to 1987
- Weber DFTH 30/34 - from 1987 until the end of production run (1989)
- Weber DFAV 32/36 - on engines exported to USA

The engine produced 74 kW (99 hp) of power and 156 N⋅m (115 lb⋅ft) of torque, though a few models with a higher output were produced (for example an 81 kW (109 hp) version used in 1976 Ford Escort RS2000).

Applications:

- 1973–1980 Ford Escort RS2000 (engine codes NEA, NE)
- 1974–1982 Ford Taunus / Ford Cortina (engine codes NEG, NER)
- 1975–1985 Ford Capri (engine codes NEE, NEN)
- 1973–1984 Ford Granada (engine codes NEB, NEH, NEK)
- 1983–1989 Ford Sierra (engine codes NES, NET, NEJ, NE5)
- 1985–1989 Ford Granada and Ford Scorpio (engine code NEL, NER, NE4)
- 1971–1974 Ford Pinto

==== Injection variant (TL20EFI) ====
The injected 2.0 L used the Ford EEC-IV engine control system which brought the output up to 85 kW (114 hp) of power and 160 N⋅m (118 lb⋅ft) of torque, although much of this increased performance can be attributed to the improved design of the EFI variants cylinder head. As the EEC-IV installation on most of those engines contains some Bosch parts that are easily visible in the engine compartment (air flow meter of the electromechanical "flap" type, injectors, fuel pressure regulator etc.), it is often - but falsely believed that they are fitted with the Bosch L-Jetronic injection system. Some of the TL20EFI engines have closed-loop lambda control, while others are lacking that feature.

Applications:

- 1985–1992 Ford Sierra (engine codes N4, NRD, N4B: 74 kW; NRB, NR2, N4A, N4I: 85 kW)
- 1985–1992 Ford Granada and Ford Scorpio (engine code NRA, NRC, NRI)
- 1991–1994 Ford Transit (engine code NCA)

==== Single point injection variant (TL20CFI) ====
This variant was used in Ford Transit exclusively. The power output was 57 kW (76 hp).

Applications:

- 1985–1992 Ford Transit (engine code N6T)

==== Cosworth YB (CH20EFI) ====
In the beginning of the 1980s, Cosworth developed a 16-valve performance head conversion for the Pinto engine. This was seen by a Ford executive who asked Cosworth to develop it with a turbo for use in the new Ford Sierra RS Cosworth. The engine is therefore based on a modified Pinto block topped with the Cosworth-developed alloy head and Garrett turbo.

== Lima OHC (LL) ==
The "Lima" versions of the engine debuted in 2.3 L (2,301 cc) form in the Ford Pinto, but although they share their basic architecture with the European version (and to a casual observer, look almost identical), they actually have few interchangeable parts due to being built to imperial measurements as opposed to metric. The European version did find its way into North America however in the Mercury Capri, which was a captive import from Ford of Europe's factories in Germany.

=== 2.0 ===
The 2.0 litre version was a narrower-bore version of the original 2.3 liter "Lima" four. Bore and stroke are 89.3 and 79.4 mm (3.52 and 3.13 in), respectively, for an overall displacement of 2.0 L; 121.4 cu in (1,990 cc). This engine was installed in the 1983–1988 Ford Rangers and in some Argentinian Ford Taunus.

Applications

- Ford Ranger (North America)
- Ford Taunus Argentina models

=== 2.3 (LL23) ===
The Ford Pinto used the OHC version, a 2.3 L (2,301 cc) unit introduced in 1974 which has a 96.04 mm (3.78 in) bore and 79.4 mm (3.13 in) stroke. This version lasted until 1997 in various guises. The earliest units produced 66 kW (89 hp) and 160 N⋅m (118 lb⋅ft). This engine has also been known as the Lima engine, after the Lima Engine plant in Lima, Ohio, where it was first manufactured (it was also manufactured in Brazil starting in 1974).

In 1979–80, a draw-through, non-intercooled turbo version was produced for Mustang Cobras and some Capris. Lack of dealership and owner training resulted in many stuck turbochargers and other maintenance problems. They were limited to 5 psi (0.34 bar) of boost, though Ford Motorsport sold a wastegate with an adjustable rod which allowed an increase up to 9 psi (0.62 bar). It was used in this carbureted form in a number of passenger cars, from the Fairmont Futura Turbo to the 1979 Indy Pace Car edition Mustang.

In 1983, Ford introduced a fuel-injected version of the turbocharged engine, which was used in the Thunderbird Turbo Coupe and the Turbo GT trim of the Mustang. In 1984, the Mustang SVO was introduced with an intercooler, initially producing 175 hp (130 kW) and later increased to 205 hp (153 kW) in 1985½. After the SVO was discontinued, the intercooler was added to the Turbo Coupe. Output for this turbo/intercooled version was 190 hp (142 kW) and 240 N⋅m (177 lb⋅ft) for the 1987–88 models with the five-speed (T-5) manual transmission. In addition to the 1983–1984 Mustang Turbo GT and 1983–1986 Turbo Coupe, the non-intercooled version of the engine was also used in the 1985–89 Merkur XR4Ti and 1984–1986 Mercury Cougar XR7, producing 155 hp (116 kW) and 190 lb⋅ft (258 N⋅m).

A version with two spark plugs per cylinder, distributor-less ignition, and reduced main bearing sizes was introduced in the 1989 Ford Ranger and 1991 Ford Mustang. This engine produced 105 hp (78 kW) and 183 N⋅m (135 lb⋅ft).

Applications

- Naturally aspirated
  - 1986–1987 Ford Aerostar
  - 1977–1982 Ford Courier
  - 1974–1980 Ford Pinto
  - 1983–1997 Ford Ranger/Mazda B-Series (North America)
  - 1974–1993 Ford Mustang
  - 1975–1979 Ford Maverick Brazilian models
  - Ford Jeep CJ-5 Brazilian models
  - Ford Rural, F-75 pick up Brazilian models
  - Ford Taunus Argentina models
  - Ford Sierra Argentina models
  - Ford Falcon (Argentina)
  - 1978–1983 Ford Fairmont
  - 1974–1980 Mercury Bobcat
  - 1979–1986 Mercury Capri
  - 1978–1983 Mercury Zephyr
  - 1983–1986 Ford LTD
  - 1983–1986 Mercury Marquis

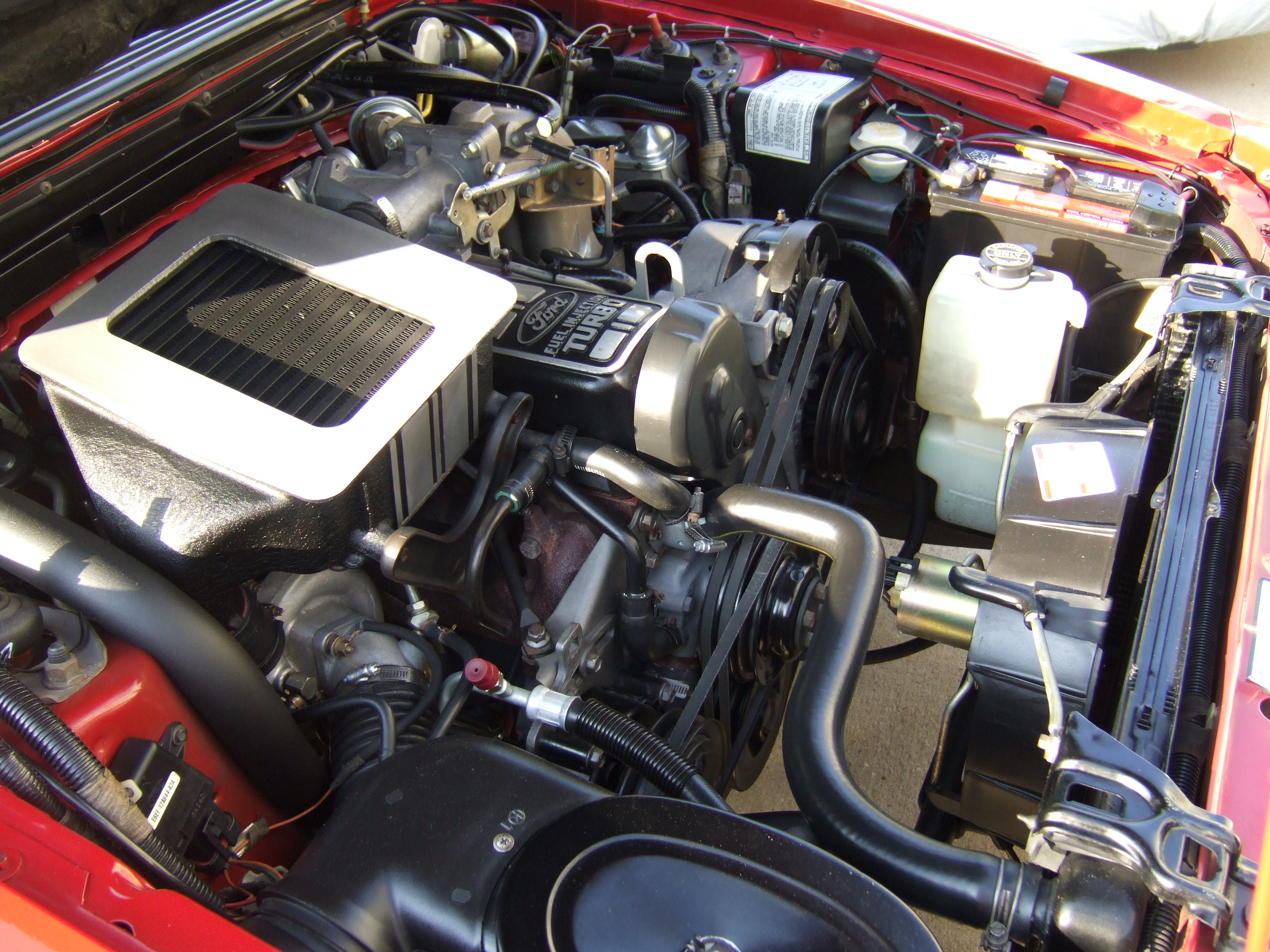
Turbocharged and intercooled 2.3 liter engine in a 1986 Mustang SVO

- Turbo
  - 1979–1981 Ford Mustang
  - 1979–1981 Mercury Capri
  - 1980 Ford Fairmont (all body styles except wagons)
  - 1980 Mercury Zephyr (all body styles except wagons)
  - 1985–1989 Merkur XR4Ti
  - 1983–1986 Thunderbird Turbo Coupe
  - 1984–1986 Mercury Cougar XR7
  - 1983–1984 Mustang Turbo GT (W Code)
  - 1983–1984 Capri Turbo RS
- Turbo/Intercooler
  - 1984–1986 Ford Mustang SVO
  - 1987–1988 Ford Thunderbird Turbo Coupe

=== 2.5 (LL25) ===
A stroked by 7 mm (0.28 in) version of the 2.3 OHC Ford Ranger engine appeared in 1998 yielding 2504 cc. In addition to the longer stroke, it used higher-flow cylinder heads utilizing narrower 7 mm (0.28 in) valve stems. Crankshaft counterbalance weights were increased in count from 4 to 8. Output was 119 hp (89 kW) and 202 N⋅m (149 lb⋅ft). It was replaced in 2001 by the Mazda-derived Duratec 23, but Ford Power Products continues to sell this engine as the LRG-425.

Applications:

- 1998–2001 Ford Ranger
- 1998–2001 Mazda B2500

== See also ==
- List of Ford engines
