= Ford Mustang SVO =

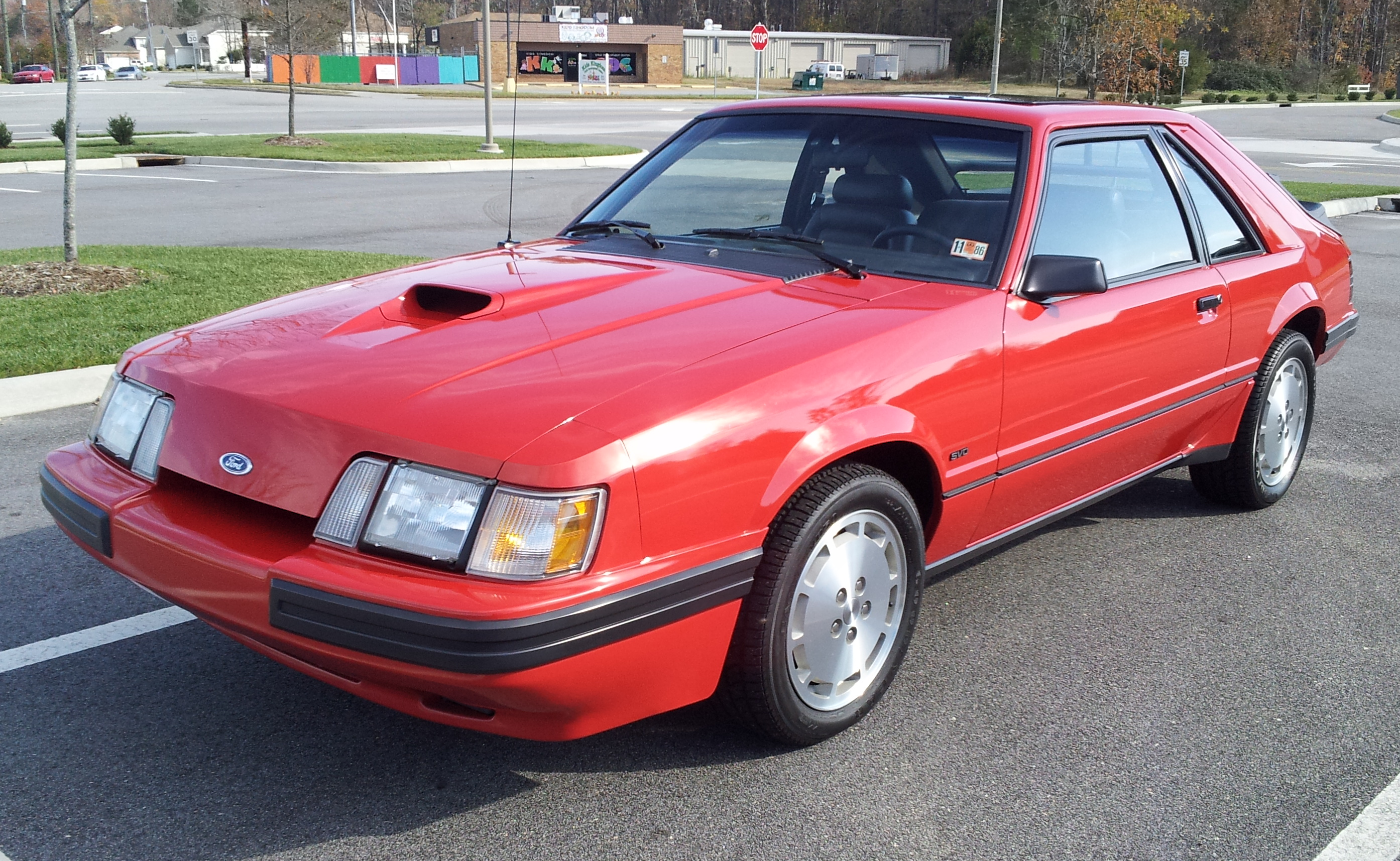
- 1986 Mustang SVO

Overview
- Manufacturer: Ford Motor Company
- Production: 1984–1986
- Assembly: Dearborn Assembly Plant, Dearborn, Michigan

Body and chassis
- Body style: 3-door liftback
- Layout: FR layout
- Platform: Ford Fox platform
- Related: Ford Mustang; Ford Fairmont; Mercury Capri; Mercury Zephyr; Ford Durango

Powertrain
- Engine: 2.3L Lima I4 turbo
- Transmission: 5-speed T-5 manual

Dimensions
- Wheelbase: 100.5 in (2,553 mm)
- Length: 181.0 in (4,597 mm)
- Width: 69.1 in (1,755 mm)
- Height: 51.9 in (1,318 mm)
- Curb weight: 2,987 lb (1,355 kg)

Chronology
- Successor: Ford Mustang SVT Cobra

The Mustang SVO is a limited-production version of the third generation Ford Mustang sold from 1984 to 1986, with fewer than 10,000 built. SVO is an acronym referring to Special Vehicle Operations, Ford Motor Company's racing division formed in 1980 to oversee all motorsports operations, distribute performance parts developed in racing programs, and develop high-performance production vehicles derived from motorsports technologies. Although it departed both physically and mechanically from any prior version of the Mustang, it held the same spot within the lineup, both in terms of performance over "lesser" variants and in prestige, as had variants such as the Shelby-tuned and "BOSS" Mustangs of the 1960s and 1970s.

== History ==
1986 Mustang SVO

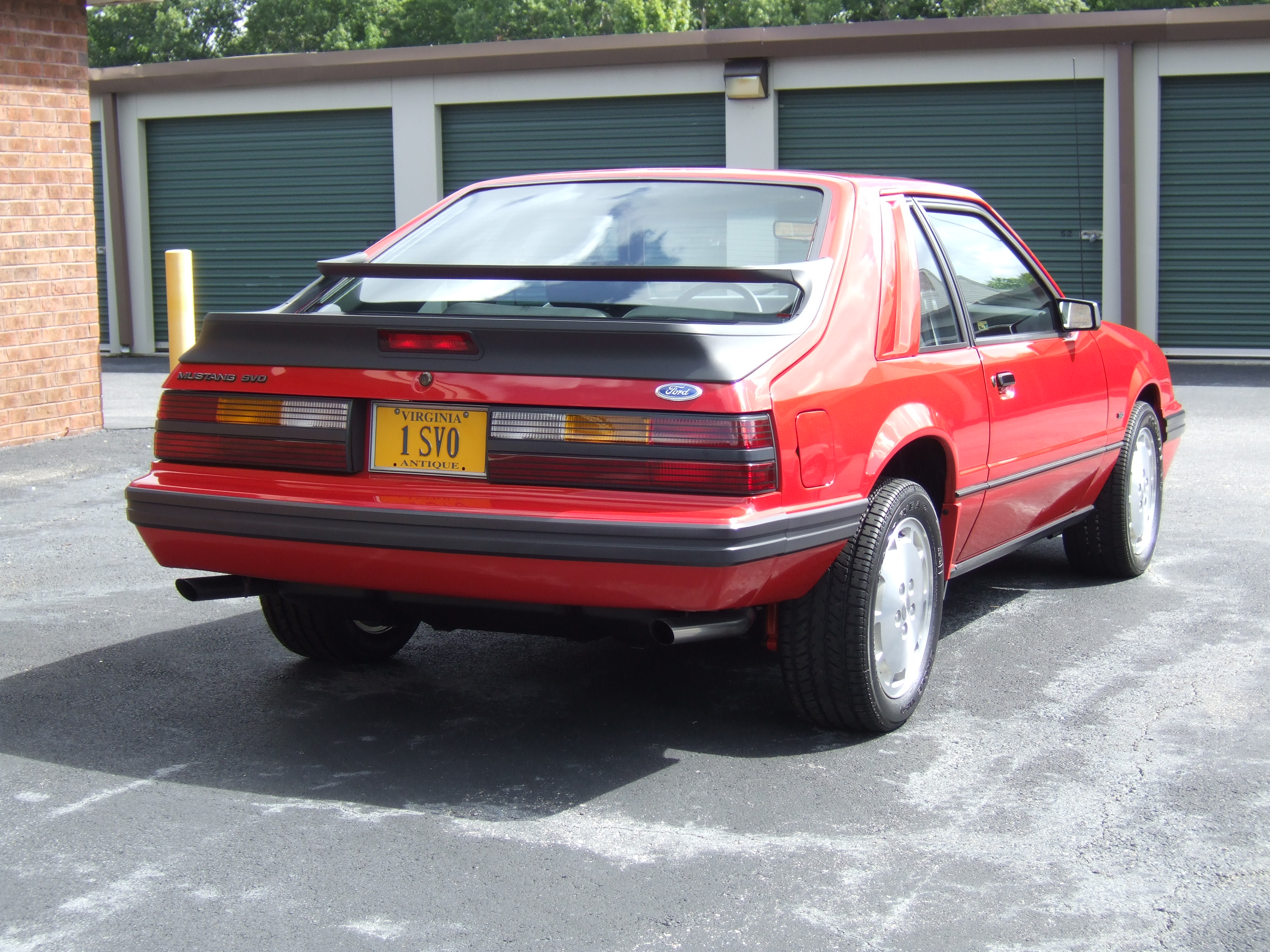
Rear view

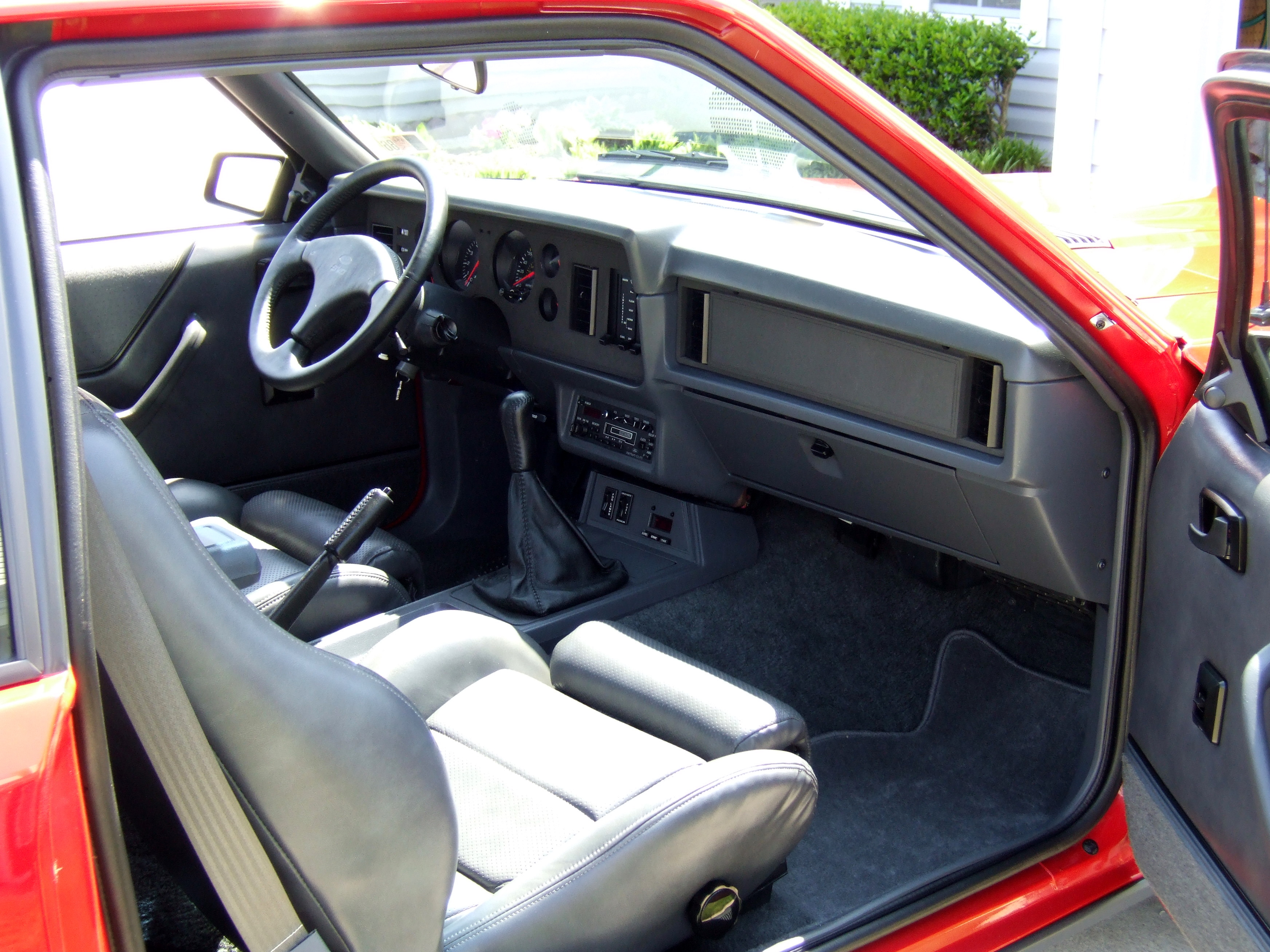
Interior

The National Traffic and Motor Vehicle Safety Act of 1966, establishing the NHTSA and federal motor vehicle safety standards; National Environmental Policy Act of 1969, which paved the way for the EPA and emissions controls; and the 1973 and 1979 oil crises all dealt significant blows to demand for American muscle cars, which became nearly extinct due to rising fuel and insurance costs and more strict safety and emissions controls imposed worldwide. As a result, the "big three" automakers (Ford, General Motors, and Chrysler Corporation), for whom muscle cars had been a steady and reliable source of income, began to suffer financially. Many of the vehicles of the muscle car era had been either completely discontinued or had been detuned to help keep them in compliance with new federal emissions regulations and the rising demand for better fuel economy. In 1970, Henry Ford II withdrew all manufacturer support for racing programs. During the 1970s, although the Mustang continued in production, its performance and image had suffered greatly; diminished power output and Ford's inability to come up with an attractive body style in the post-fastback era were major issues.

Ford began to make a major push forward with the newly introduced Fox platform Mustang in 1979; by 1982, Ford had nearly completely reinvented every aspect of the vehicle, which included putting a new emphasis on the model's sporty nature. Just prior to this, in late 1979, Ford decided to form a division that could oversee both the company's racing program and the production of limited-edition, high-performance, street-legal vehicles based on or taking technology from the race vehicles. Officially, the division was called the Special Vehicle Operations, but the public came to know them as simply SVO (S-V-O). SVO was led by Michael Kranefuss, who had previously headed the racing arm of Ford of Europe as director of motorsports, starting from 1972. SVO was expected to develop a limited-production passenger car, ostensibly to transfer the team's racing success to the streets, but ultimately also to help fund its operations with added revenue.

Tasked with developing something that was both plainly American and competent enough to compete with entry-level European sports cars of the day, the team began tuning the Mustang, deeming it the most obvious basis for a high-performance vehicle. The engineering team working on the new Mustang SVO was led by Glen Lyall; Bob Negstad handled chassis development. Ford President Donald Petersen called it "our most definitive effort on the American scene to put together the finest we have in the way of a smaller-displacement, higher-revving turbocharged kind of touring car".

At the same time, Ford had been working with Mazda to develop a proposed replacement for the Mustang, making plans to discontinue the Fox platform-based Mustangs, but enthusiasts protested and the joint Ford/Mazda sporty car was introduced eventually as the Ford Probe instead in 1988. Initial schedules had called for the SVO Special Mustang to be introduced as a 1982½ model, but the confusion that resulted from the (temporary) cancellation of Fox platform Mustangs delayed the introduction of the Mustang SVO to a 1983 press event in northern California's Napa and Sonoma counties. That event included track time at the Sears Point Raceway. With Ford continuing to make year-to-year decisions about the discontinuation of the Fox platform Mustang, the SVO was seen as both a potential celebratory edition and a bridge to future turbocharged performance vehicles. List price for the 1984½ Mustang SVO was US$15,585 (equivalent to $48,000 in 2025) when it hit dealerships in mid-April 1984, more than double the price of a base Mustang. The Mustang GT was US$6,000 cheaper.

By 1986, Ford again was considering dropping the Fox platform Mustang in favor of the Probe, so SVO shifted their attention to Project GN34 and what would become the 1987 Ford Thunderbird Turbo Coupe (nicknamed the "Aerobird"). Total Mustang SVO production was 9,844, with most sold the first year: 4,508 (1984), 1,954 (1985), and 3,382 (1986).

== Specifications ==
=== Turbocharged 2.3 liter engine ===
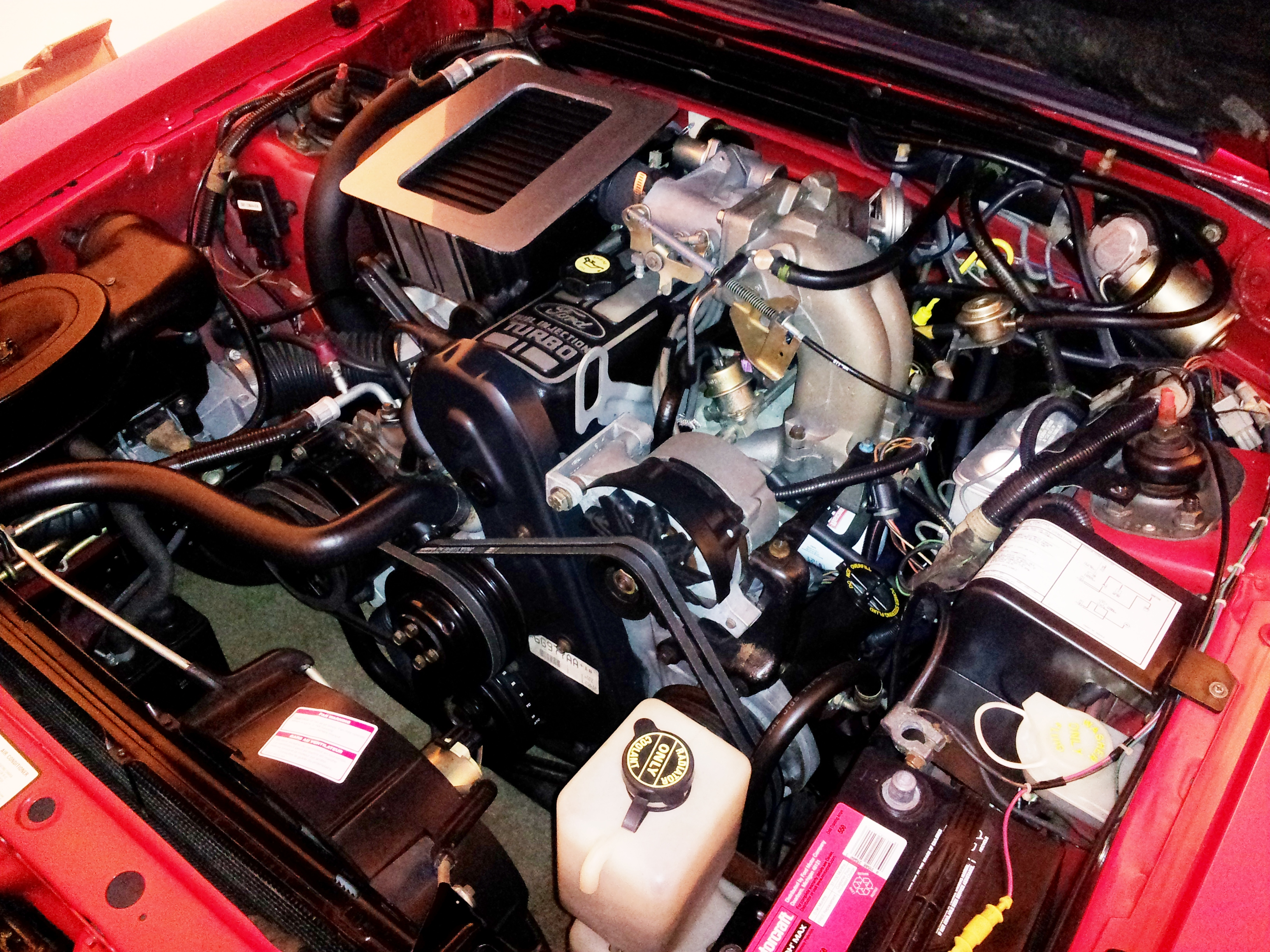
2.3L turbocharged Lima I4; intercooler with sealing flange prominent at top left

Despite what many think, the selection of a small displacement turbocharged and intercooled powerplant had nothing to do with fuel consumption and emissions. SVO engineers opted to forgo the production 5.0 liter Windsor V-8 fitted in the Mustang GT in favor of a detuned version of the turbocharged 2.3 liter Lima inline four racing engine used in the IMSA Mustang GTP. The base engines were originally used in the Pinto and Ford Mustang II. The four-cylinder engine was chosen over the V8 because SVO wanted a high tech solution and, in order to get the handling dynamic right, they had to transform the weight distribution of the platform. The engine was installed longitudinally and positioned further back than the V8 variant. Fitted with a Garrett AiResearch T03 turbo, Ford's new state-of-the-art EEC-IV controlled fuel injection system, it also broke new ground with first air-to-air intercooler used domestically. At an unheard of (at the time) 14 psi boost, it developed 175 hp (130 kW) at 4400 rpm and torque of 210 lb⋅ft (280 N⋅m) at 3000 rpm. The larger High Output 5.0L V8 in the Mustang GT/Capri RS was also rated at 175 at 4200, but had more torque at 245 lb⋅ft (332 N⋅m) at 2400 in 1984. Compared with the V8, the 2.3L SVO engine was 150 lb (68 kg) lighter. In 1985, 5.0 H.O. horsepower increased to 210 while horsepower for Mustang SVO remained at 175. Horsepower increased to 205 for the 1985½ edition, which saw many vital improvements. These included new air/fuel maps tuned inside a new 'PE' ECU and upgraded 35lb/hr 'brown top' injectors to match. The Vane Air Meter (VAM) was upgraded to a larger unit, and the intake was redesigned from an in-line plenum to a square design for improved air flow. The camshaft was upgraded slightly with increased valve lift. A faster spooling 0.46 A/R turbine housing replaced the 0.63 A/R to the Garret T3 to build boost quicker. It was essentially the car SVO wanted to build from the outset. 1986 was mostly carryover for the SVO, while the 1986 5.0 also made 200 horsepower after transitioning from Holley carburation to electronic fuel injection.

In addition, a "fuel grade" switch was added to the dash, allowing the driver to adjust the vehicle's spark advance depending on whether premium or standard grade fuel was being used; the computer-controlled system limited boost pressure to 10 psi (69 kPa) below 2,500 RPM, rising to 14 psi (97 kPa) at faster engine speeds with premium fuel. A factory-installed Hurst shifter was made standard to improve feel and quickness.

With fine tuning and the addition of a new water-cooling system, power output rose to 200 or 205 horsepower (153 kW) for the 439 1985½ SVOs (there is some ambiguity), dropping back to 200 horsepower (149 kW) for 1986. The vehicle's standard Borg-Warner T-5 five-speed manual transmission was updated in 1985, receiving revised gearing to match the new 3:73 rear end ratio.

Mustang SVO horsepower and torque ratings by year
Year	Power	Torque
1984	175 hp (130 kW) @ 4400 rpm	210 lb⋅ft (285 N⋅m) @ 3000 rpm
1985	175 hp (130 kW) @ 4400 rpm	210 lb⋅ft (285 N⋅m) @ 3000 rpm
1985½	205 hp (153 kW) @ 5000 rpm	248 lb⋅ft (336 N⋅m) @ 3200 rpm
1986	200 hp (149 kW) @ 5000 rpm	240 lb⋅ft (325 N⋅m) @ 3200 rpm

=== Other upgrades ===
1985½ training article

In addition to the advanced engine, the SVO featured several key modifications over the standard Mustang to help increase performance. The front suspension geometry was modified, 15:1 ratio power-assisted rack-and-pinion steering system replaced the standard system, a limited-slip, 3.45:1, 7.5-inch Traction-Lok rear axle was added for the first year of production (later models used a 3.73:1 ratio, 7.5" axle), a new, ventilated four-wheel-disc braking system (sourced from Fox platform cousin Continental Mark VII) replaced the GT's disc/drum setup (a first for the Mustang), specially designed pedals were used to aid heel-and-toe shifting and a six-shock KONI suspension system featuring specially tuned adjustable front struts, rear shocks, and horizontal rear dampers replaced the setup used on the Mustang GT. The KONI shocks had settings for "cross country" (front and rear), "GT" (front only), and "competition" (front and rear); the lateral rear shocks served to eliminate axle hop. Five-lug, 16 × 7-inch aluminum wheels with P225-50R16 tires were standard, as well; originally the SVO was fitted with German Goodyear NCT tires, which were changed later to Goodyear Eagle "Gatorback" tires; Chevrolet had signed an agreement with Goodyear for the Gatorback to be fitted exclusively in 1984 to the Corvette (C4), a competitor whose handling and performance was attributed to the tires.

The ventilated rear disc brakes, the five-lug hubs, the 16-inch (406 mm) wheels, the quad-shock rear end (early 84 units used a solid steel traction bar with a rubber cover), and the KONIs were used on the SVO before any other Mustang. Negstad tightened the shock valving in 1985 and again in 1986, noting "people assumed you were supposed to pay a little punishment for this love affair of driving this car. It can't be that comfortable!"

=== Styling ===
Interior was only available in charcoal grey (leather or cloth) and standard features included adjustable sport seats with lumbar supports and a leather-wrapped tilt steering wheel, shift lever, and emergency brake handle, which were not normally found on small American coupes. Just six major options were available: air conditioning, a cassette tape player, power door locks and windows, a flip-up sun roof, and leather seat trim. However, an optional Competition Prep package (option code 41C) deleted many of those features to save approximately 100 lb (45 kg) from the curb weight; only 123 such examples were built (40 in 1985 and 83 in 1986). The speedometer carried labels for speeds up to 85 mph (137 km/h), but had unlabeled rulings out to 140 mph (230 km/h) to comply with federal regulations.

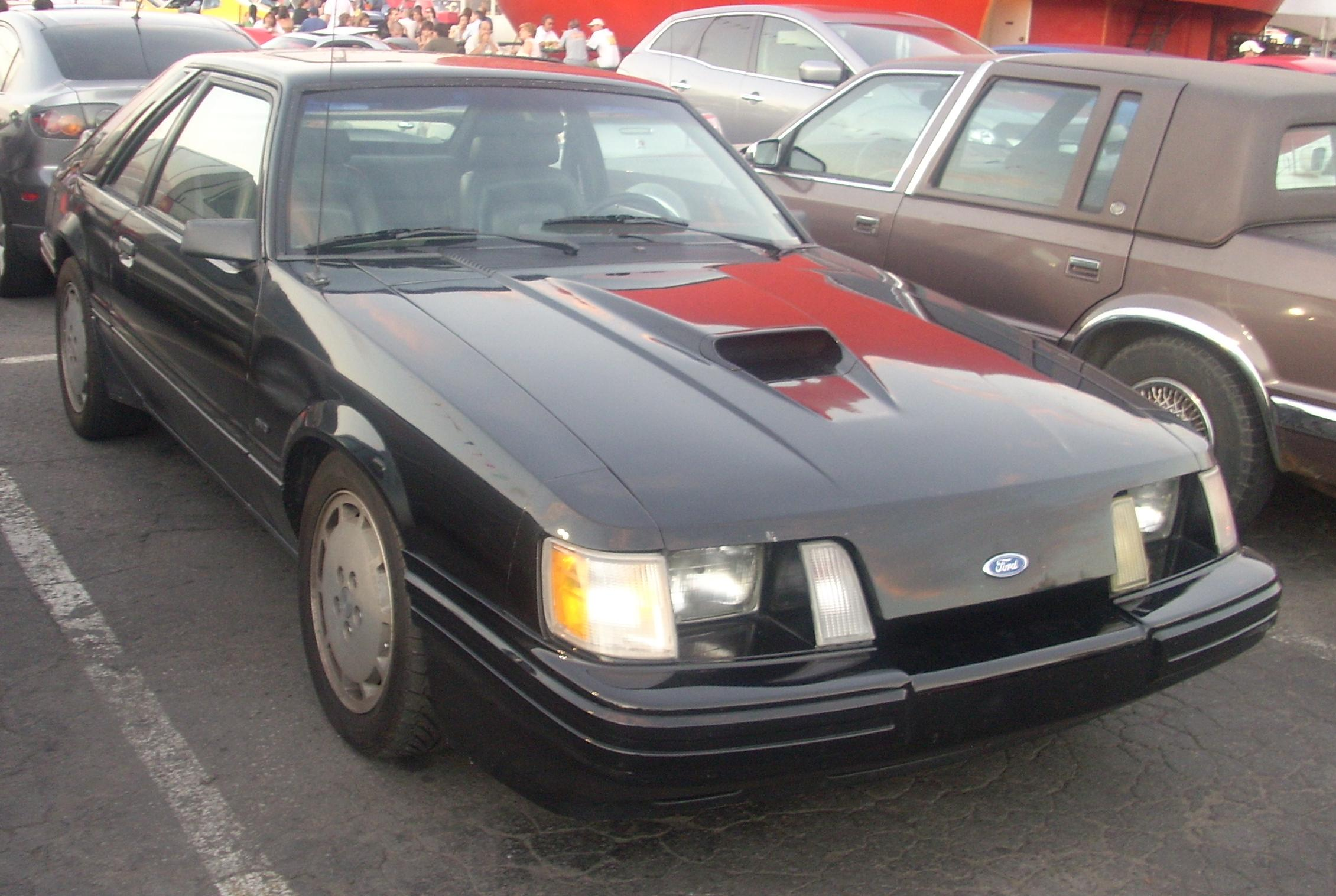
1984/85 Mustang SVO with sealed-beam headlamps

The exterior had a unique front grille and hood that was only used on the SVO line; the front end was designed to accept both sealed beam headlamps and forthcoming composite headlamps. However, the NHTSA was late in approving the composite headlamps with replaceable 9004 bulbs in the summer of 1983, a few months after the April 1983 introduction of 1984 Mustang SVO. The Mustang SVO was fitted with sealed beam headlamp capsules for 1984 model year. For 1985½ and 1986 models, the composite headlamps replaced the sealed beam headlamp capsules, improving the appearance. The hood had a functional scoop for the intercooler.

In addition, the Mustang SVO had thinner side moldings, smoother sail panels behind the rear quarter windows, small rear wheel spats, and a biplane spoiler that was also unique to the SVO. The coefficient of drag was 0.39, dropping slightly to 0.38 (0.37 per Ford) with the new composite headlamps fitted to the 1985½ The pinstriped taillights introduced on the SVO were later reused on the 1993 Cobra model, as well. Only four colors were available for 1984: black, silver (metallic), red ("Medium Canyon Red"), and dark grey ("Dark Charcoal Metallic").

== Performance and reception ==
With the standard 3.45:1 rear axle, acceleration of the 1984½ SVO was 0–60 mph (0–97 km/h) in 7.5 seconds, covering the quarter mile in 15.5 seconds with a trap speed of 90 mph (140 km/h). An example tested by Popular Science accelerated to 60 mph (97 km/h) in 11.2 seconds, carrying the driver, a passenger, and approximately 30 lb (14 kg) of test equipment. As tested by Popular Mechanics (PM), the quarter-mile performance was 15.8 seconds at 90.1 mph (145.0 km/h). That performance improved to 15.0 seconds at 94 mph (151 km/h) in 1985 with the 3.73:1 axle. Observed fuel economy during a 10-way comparison test at Lime Rock Park was 11.2 mpg_{‑US} (21.0 L/100 km; 13.5 mpg_{‑imp}), compared to an advertised 17 mpg_{‑US} (14 L/100 km; 20 mpg_{‑imp}) under the EPA City driving cycle. The EPA highway estimate was 32 mpg_{‑US} (7.4 L/100 km; 38 mpg_{‑imp}).

According to Daniel Charles Ross of PM, "The total effect of the SVO reworking of the Mustang is a successful one, in looks and equipment. ... The vehicle's race car-like handling characteristics allow very little roll in hard cornering ... It's definitely a nice piece of work." In a follow-up comparison report for PM, the magazine called it "a kind of modern-day Shelby Mustang GT-350" but compared to the Mustang GT V8 that was included in the comparison, the SVO "delivers acceleration identical to the V8, 20 percent worse fuel economy and absolutely no low-speed torque" and concluded it was "unsuitable and dangerous on the street because the turbo power comes on so suddenly". The car that Ford had supplied for the comparison had shaved tire treads to enhance performance, so PM tested another example later, writing "the ride is really excellent for a sports car ... with 30 hp less than the Mustang GT V8, and much less weight in the nose, the SVO handles a lot better, too"; although there were several nuisances related to seating position and controls, PM concluded the Mustang SVO was "a commitment to high performance after so long a drought in Detroit. Not the irresponsible high performance of the muscle car era, but performance with fuel economy, brakes and handling." When tested by Road & Track, they noted: "The appeal of the car is in its balance, which transcends even the outstanding individual characteristics." and "This may be the best all-around car for the enthusiast driver ever produced by the U.S. industry." Autoweek concluded their assessment with: "All we can say after driving both [the BMW 320i and the Mustang SVO] is, 'No contest.' and 'Congratulations, SVO'." Motor Trend said "Bold in concept and intelligent in execution." Car and Driver said "When you strap it on, it feels right." and "This is an important vehicle, a harbinger of things to come."
