= Ford Mustang (third generation) =

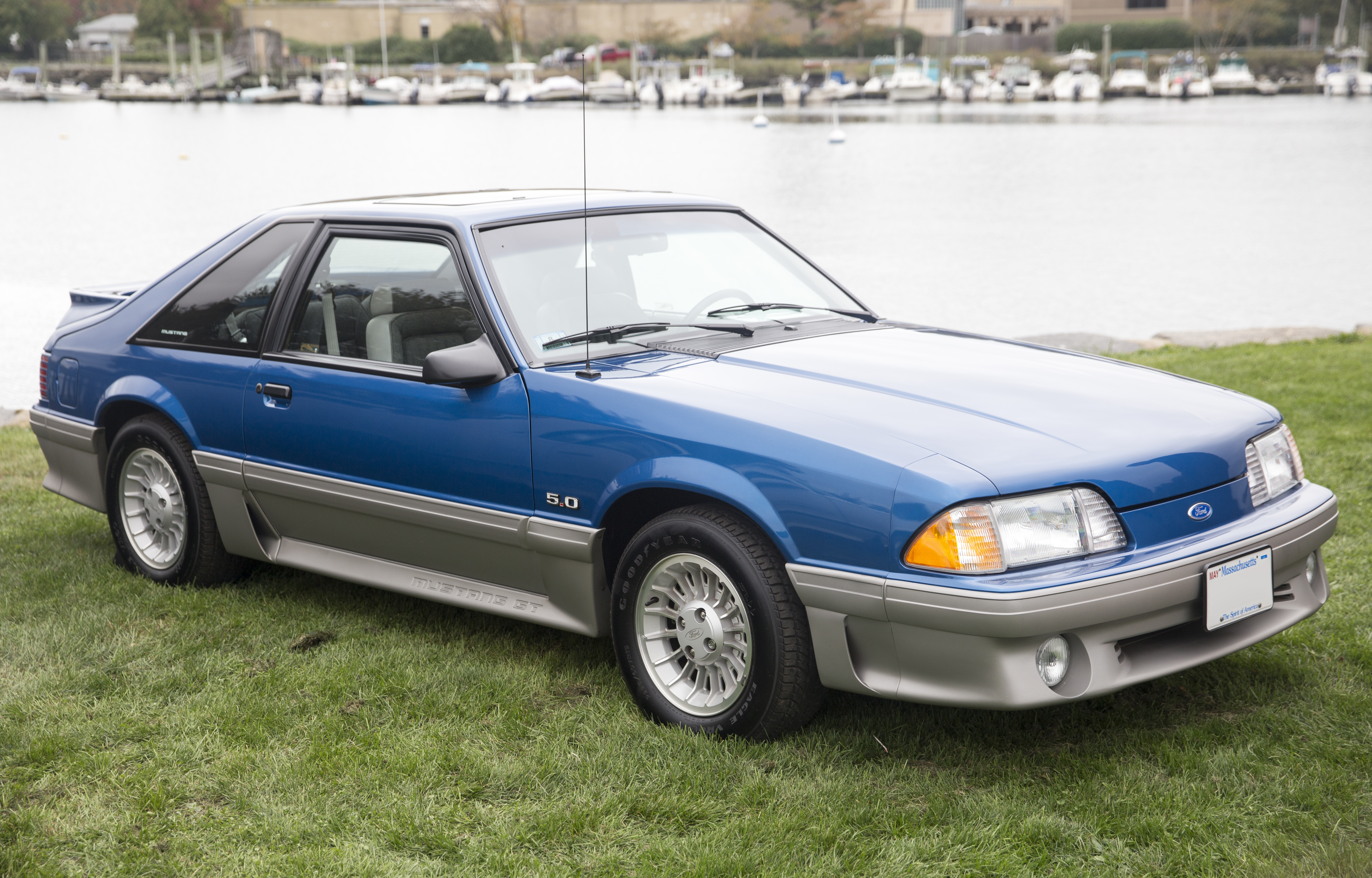
- 1990 Ford Mustang GT

Overview
- Manufacturer: Ford
- Also called: Ford T5 (Germany)
- Production: 1978 – 26 August 1993
- Model years: 1979–1993
- Assembly: United States: Dearborn, Michigan (Ford River Rouge Complex); Milpitas, California (San Jose Assembly Plant); Mexico: Cuautitlán Izcalli (Cuautitlán Assembly); Mexico City (La Villa Assembly); Venezuela: Valencia (Valencia Assembly)
- Designer: Jack Telnack (1976)

Body and chassis
- Class: Pony car
- Body style: 2-door convertible 2-door coupe 3-door hatchback
- Layout: FR layout
- Platform: Ford Fox platform
- Related: Ford Durango; Ford Fairmont; Ford Granada; Ford LTD; Ford Thunderbird (80–82); Ford Thunderbird (83–88); Mercury Capri; Mercury Cougar (80–82); Mercury Cougar (83–88); Mercury Marquis; Mercury Zephyr; Lincoln Continental; Lincoln Mark VII

Powertrain
- Engine: 2.3 L (140 cu in) Lima I4; 2.3 L (140 cu in) Lima turbo I4; 3.3 L (200 cu in) Thriftpower I6; 2.8 L (171 cu in) Cologne V6; 3.8 L (232 cu in) Essex V6; 4.2 L (255 cu in) small block V8; 4.9 L (302 cu in) "5.0" small block V8
- Transmission: Four or five-speed manual; Three or four-speed automatic

Dimensions
- Wheelbase: 100.5 in (2,553 mm)
- Length: 179.6 in (4,562 mm)
- Width: 1979–82: 67.4 in (1,712 mm); 1983–90: 69.1 in (1,755 mm); 1991–93: 68.3 in (1,735 mm)
- Height: 1979–82: 51.5 in (1,308 mm); 1983–84: 51.9 in (1,318 mm); 1985–93: 52.1 in (1,323 mm)
- Curb weight: Coupe; 1980: 2,608 lb (1,183 kg); 1983: 2,684 lb (1,217 kg); 1987: 2,724 lb (1,236 kg); Hatchback; 1980: 2,642 lb (1,198 kg); 1983: 2,744 lb (1,245 kg); 1987: 2,782 lb (1,262 kg); Convertible; 1987: 2,921 lb (1,325 kg)

Chronology
- Predecessor: Ford Mustang (second generation)
- Successor: Ford Mustang (fourth generation)

The third-generation Mustang is a pony car manufactured and marketed by Ford from 1979–1993, using the company's Fox platform and colloquially called the Fox body Mustang. During its third generation, the Mustang evolved through several sub-models, trim levels, and drivetrain combinations during its production and seemed destined for replacement with a front-wheel drive Mazda platform. Company executives were swayed by consumer opinion and the rear-wheel drive Mustang stayed in production, while the front-wheel drive version was renamed the Ford Probe. Production ended with the introduction of the fourth-generation Mustang (SN-95) for the 1994 model year.

== 1979–1982 ==
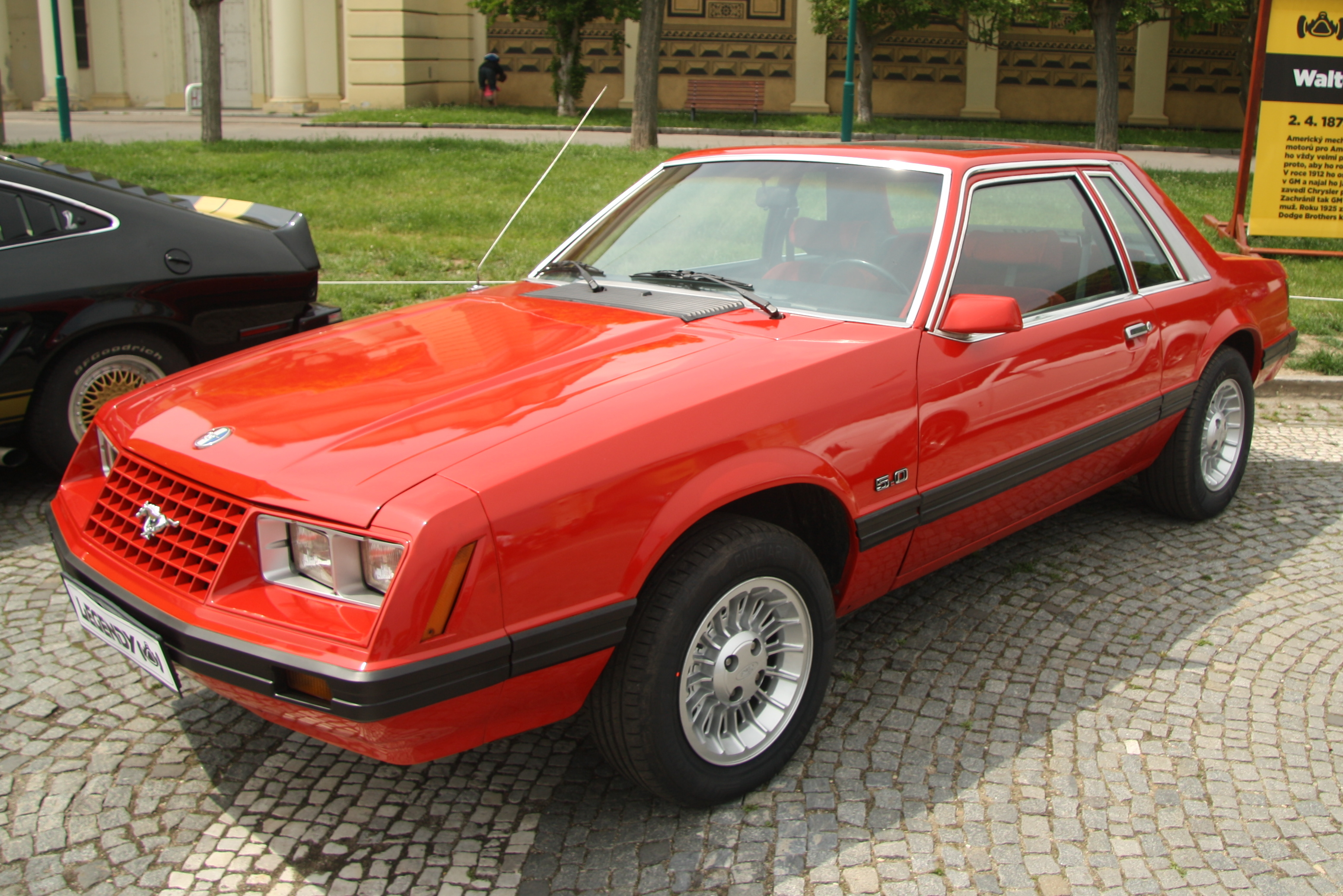
1979 Ford Mustang notchback coupe

The 1979 model year Mustang used the Fox platform intended by Ford as "a one-size-fits-all [platform] to serve as a two-door sports car and a four-door family car," initially used with the Ford Fairmont and Mercury Zephyr twins that debuted in for model year 1978. "Ford built the 1979 Mustang around a platform it would share with more humble cars in the Lincoln-Mercury-Ford corporate family in order to keep development and construction costs down." Body styles for the Mustang included a 2-door sedan (coupe) and 3-door sedan (hatchback). Two trim levels were available: the base model and the more luxurious Ghia model. The wheelbase was 5 in (127 mm) shorter than the Fairmont/Zephyr series at 100.5 in (2,553 mm) (nearly the same as the outgoing European Ford Capri and over 4 in (102 mm) longer than the Mustang II).

=== Cobra ===
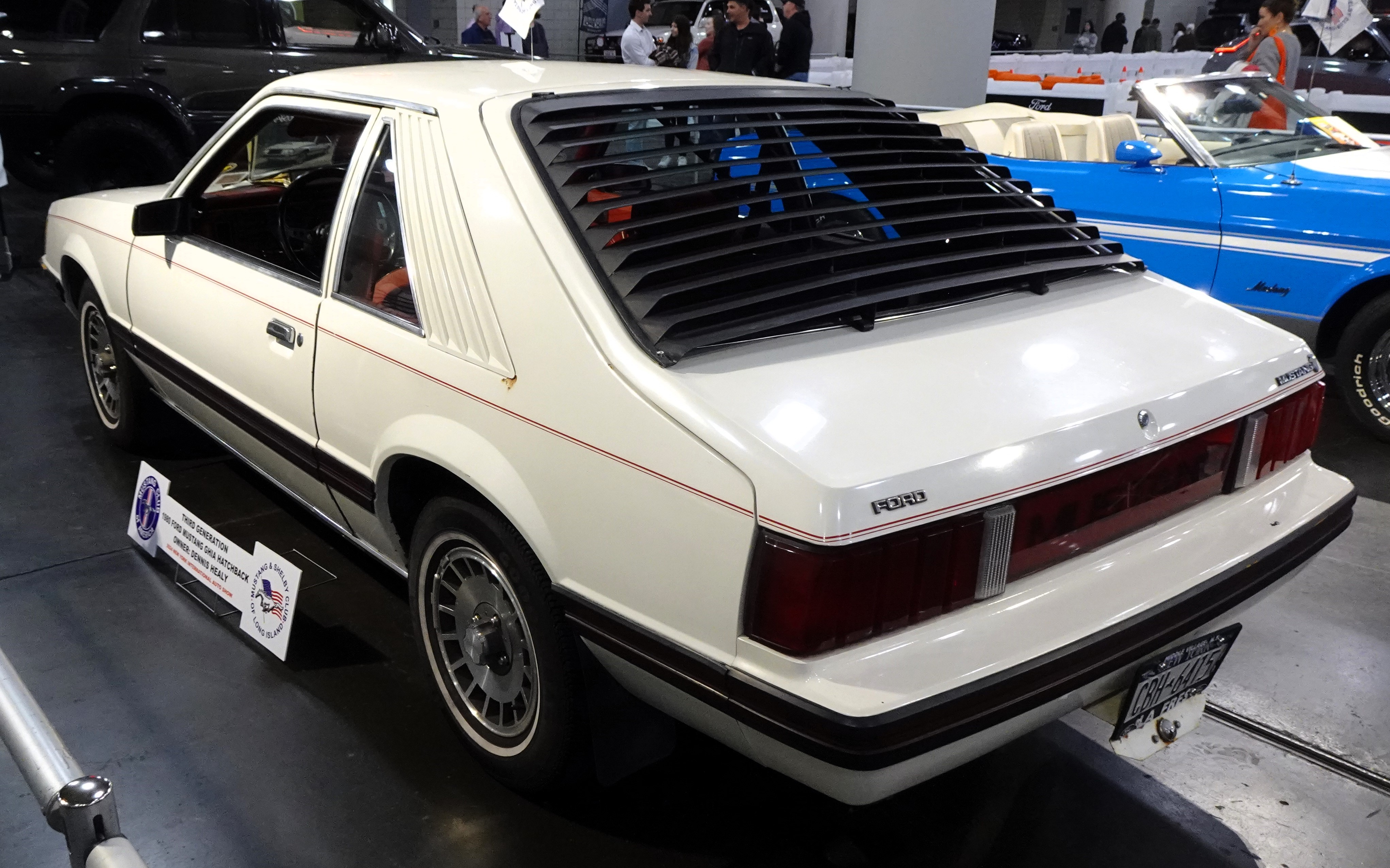
1980 Ford Mustang Ghia hatchback rear

The Cobra appearance package also made its debut in 1979 and would continue through both the 1980 and 1981 model years. The 1979 Cobra (17,579 produced) featured a black grille, trim, and moldings (except the sail panels that were painted body color), as well as black lower body paint. The door handles, door locks, antenna, and roof drip rail were bright. Color-coordinated dual pinstripes in the wraparound body-side moldings and bumpers, as well as COBRA decals on the doors, were standard. All 1979 Cobras came equipped with a small, center mount non-functional hood scoop (to provide clearance for the air cleaner due to the 2.3 L Turbo extra height). The Cobra hood decal was optional for 1979. Rear spoilers were not included on the 1979 models, as they made their debut on the mid-year introduction of the Indianapolis 500 Pace Car replica. The 1980 Cobra (5,550 produced) and the 1981 Cobra (1,821 produced) received a new front bumper and air dam with fog lights, non-functional cowl-type hood scoop, and rear spoiler (all carried over from the earlier Pace Car replicas). Graphics included belt-line stripes, a redesigned hood decal, and "COBRA" decals on both the side quarter windows and the rear spoiler. The exterior trim on both the 1980 and 1981 Cobras was black, including the door handles, key locks, antenna, and sail panels.

Interior Cobra-specific parts on all 1979–1981 Cobras included "Engine Turned" dash bezels and three COBRA emblems — one in each door panel and one on the passenger side dash bezel.

Drivetrains in the 1979 model year consisted of the 140 cu in (2.3 L) four-cylinder Turbo engine, rated at 131 hp (98 kW; 133 PS), with a Borg-Warner four-speed manual transmission or the small block 302 cu in (4.9 L) V8 (marketed as 5.0 L), rated at 139 hp (104 kW; 141 PS), with a four-speed manual overdrive transmission or a three-speed automatic transmission. For the 1980 model year only, the 2.3 L four-cylinder Turbo engine was available with an optional three-speed automatic transmission. However, the four-speed manual was still standard. The 302 small block V8 was replaced with a 4.2 L (255 cu in) V8, rated at 118 hp (88 kW; 120 PS), with a three-speed automatic transmission. For the 1981 model year, the powertrains list was expanded to include a naturally aspirated 2.3 L engine and a 3.3 L (200 cu in) I6 engine. The 2.3 L Turbo engine was only available in Canada, the automatic transmission was no longer optional, and the four-speed manual transmission was replaced by an overdrive five-speed manual transmission made by Tremec (model VS140). The 4.2 L V8 also remained optional in 1981, rated this time at 120 hp (89 kW; 122 PS).

=== Indianapolis Pace Cars ===
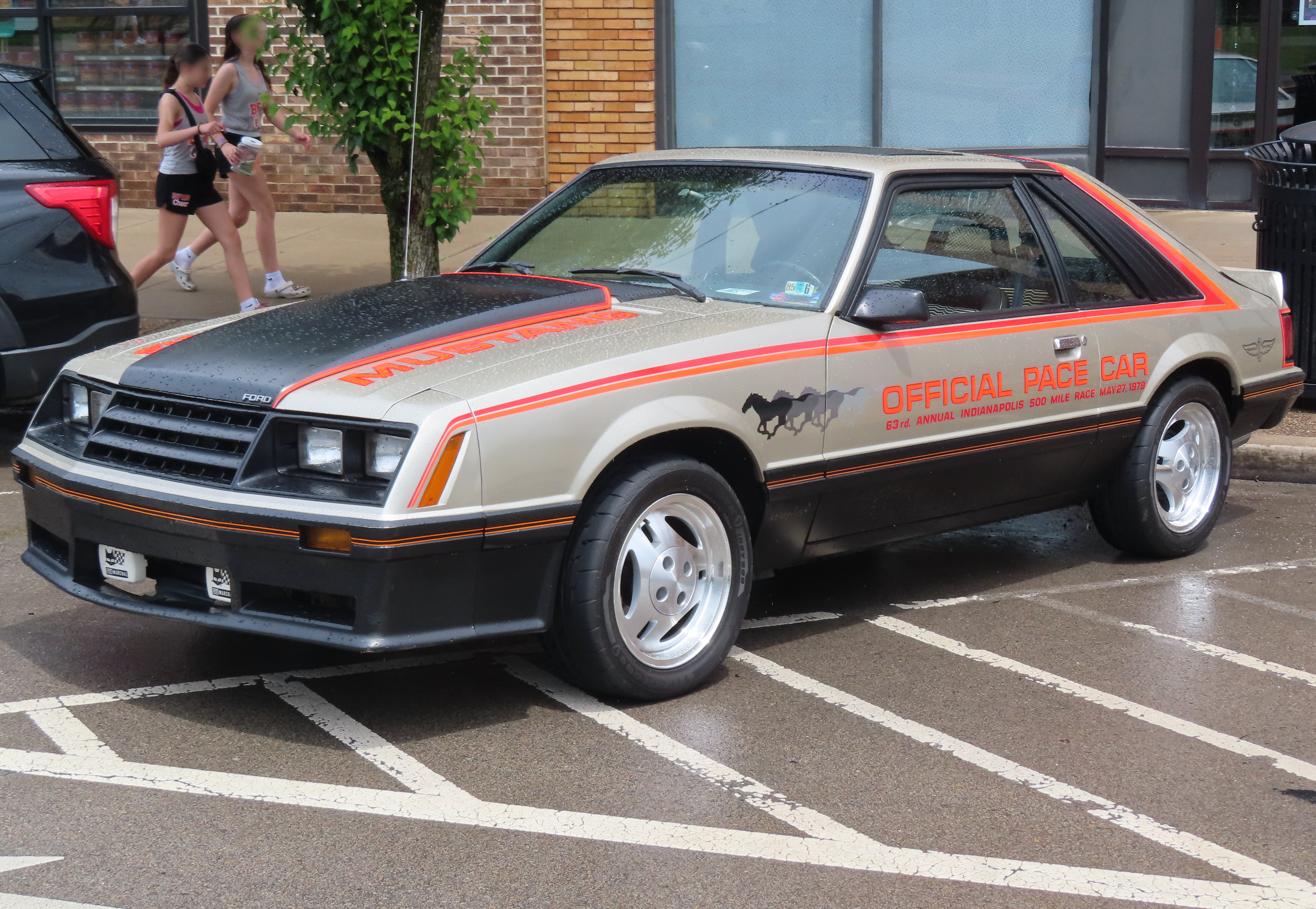
1979 Mustang Indianapolis 500 pace car

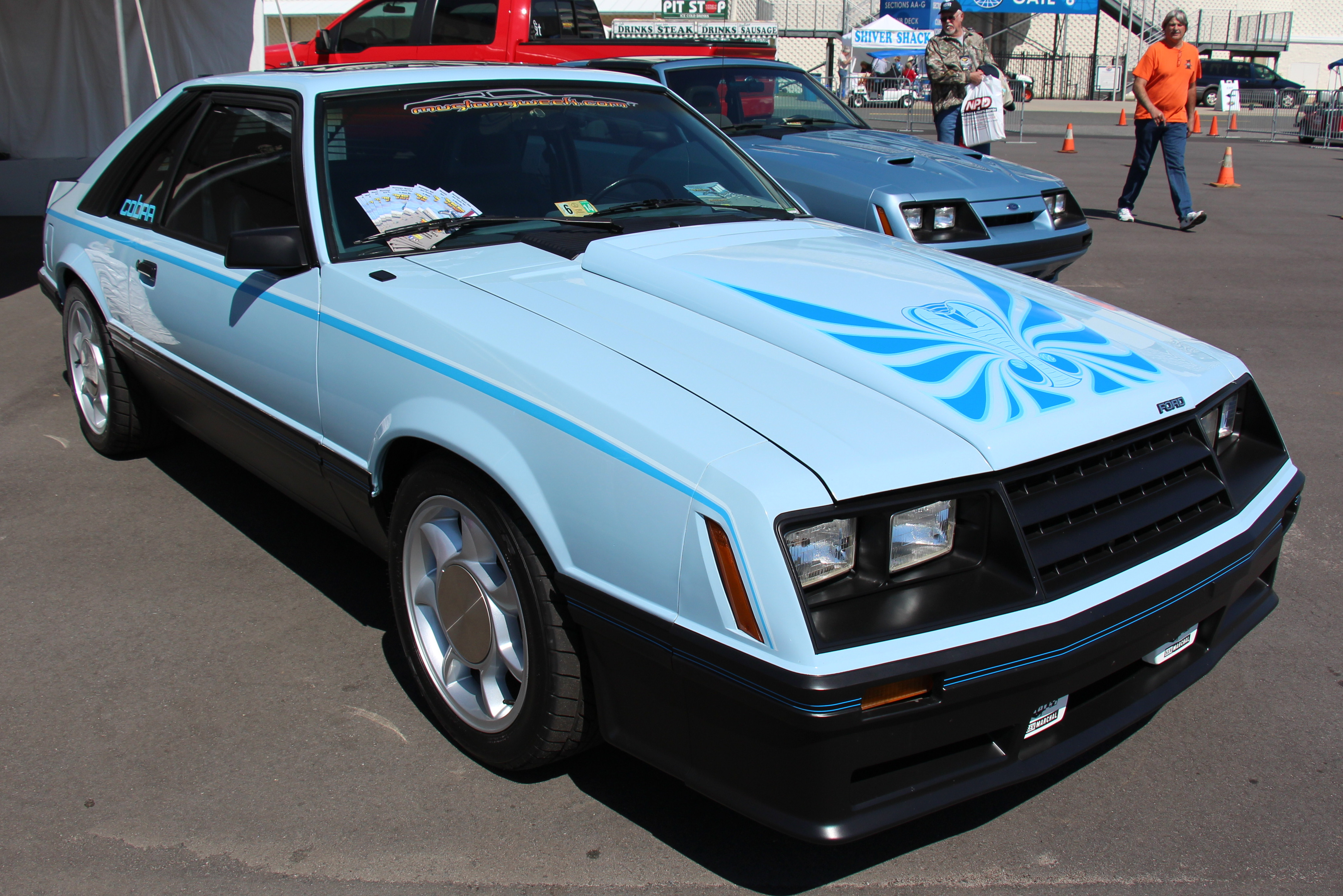
1981 Ford Mustang Cobra hatchback

The Ford Mustang was chosen as the Official Pace Car of the 1979 Indianapolis 500. Ford commemorated this event with a mid-year "Indy 500" Pace Car version (10,479 produced). All were finished in two-tone pewter and black with orange and red graphics. The front end featured a unique front air dam with fog lights, and a full-length cowl-type hood scoop, while the rear was available with a new for 1979 rear spoiler (all of these additions carried over to both the 1980 and 1981 Cobra). The black interior featured Recaro seats with patterned black and white inserts. Available were the 2.3 L (140 cu in) four-cylinder Turbo with a four-speed manual transmission or the 302 cu in (4.9 L) V8 with either a four-speed manual overdrive or three-speed automatic transmission. The production cars included a sunroof. However, the three actual pace cars were fitted with a T-top by Cars & Concepts of Brighton, MI. The removable panel roof option would not become an available option until the 1981 model year.

=== GT ===
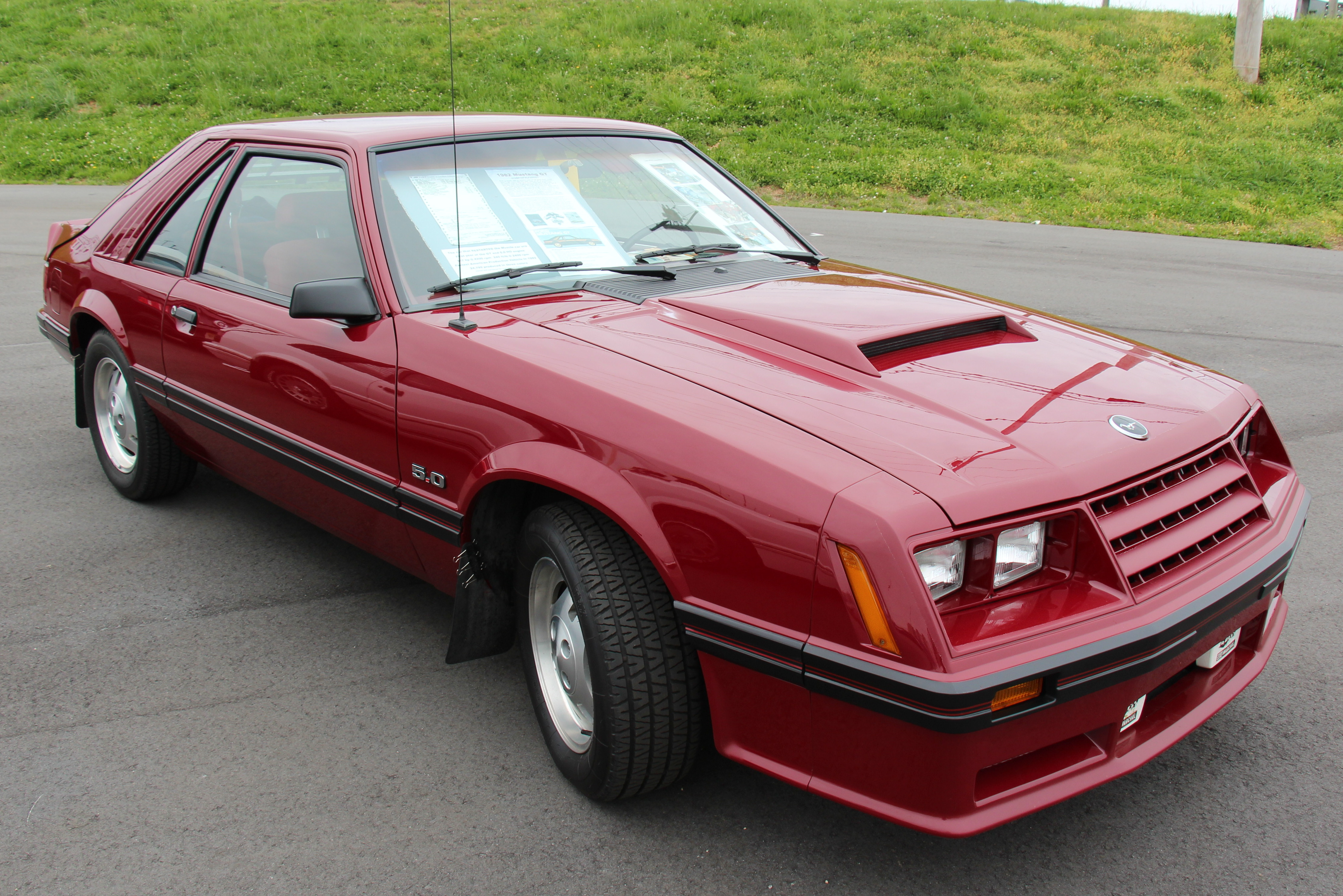
1982 Ford Mustang GT hatchback

For 1982, the Cobra model was dropped in favor of the Mustang GT, which returned after 13 years. This would garner the slogan, "The Boss is Back!" This new GT model featured a re-engineered 157 hp (117 kW; 159 PS) High Output Windsor 302 cu in (4.9 L) engine with new valves, a more aggressive cam (from a 1973 351W Torino application), a larger two-barrel carburetor, a revised firing order, and a better breathing intake and exhaust system. The Tremec "SROD" four-speed manual override was the standard, and the only available, transmission behind the 302 (4.9 L) in 1982. The dual-snorkel air cleaner was emblazoned with "5.0 Liter H.O." lettering. The GT included the front air dam with fog lamps and the rear spoiler from the 1979 Pace Car and the 1980 and 1981 Cobras. However, the full-length hood scoop from those models did not carry over and the smaller 1979 Cobra hood scoop made its return on the GT. Four colors were offered on the GT model, and they consisted of black, bright red (mid-year introduction), dark red, and silver. The 302 cu in (4.9 L) was available on lower-trim models; L, GL, and GLX. It also formed the basis for the "SSP" (Special Service Package) cars that were used by government as well as police/law enforcement and were almost exclusively ordered in the 2-door sedan body style. If an automatic transmission was ordered in the 1982 GT, the 302 (4.9 L) was replaced with the 255 (4.2 L), which was carried over from 1981. The automatic transmission was a Ford C5, which replaced the Ford C4 in 1981. The hood scoop was optional, at an extra cost, on the 1982 GT with the 4.2 L engine and C5 automatic. The carbureted, Turbocharged 2.3 L engine was also available in the 1982 GT, but only in the Canada market.

=== Powertrains ===
Engines for the 1979–1982 models included the 88 hp (66 kW) 2.3 L Pinto inline-four, 109 hp (81 kW) 2.8 L Cologne V6 (made by Ford of Germany), and the 140 hp (104 kW) Ford small block engine back in 1982 with the moniker of 5.0 L and with its front fenders badged as such. All were carried over from the Mustang II line. Shortly after the model year started an 89 hp (66 kW) 3.3 L straight-six engine was available. Supplies of the 2.8 L V6 proved inadequate leading to it being discontinued in late 1979. A new 132 hp (98 kW) 2.3 L turbo four-cylinder, debuted that offered similar horsepower to the V8. The 2.3 and 2.3 L turbo, as well as the V8 models, could also be optioned with the newly developed TRX handling suspension that included Michelin 390 mm tires and accompanying metric-sized wheels.

Following the second oil crisis in 1979, the 302 V8 engine was dropped in favor of a 4.2 L (255 cu in) V8 that delivered better fuel economy. The 255 was the only V8 offered in 1980 and 1981. Basically a sleeved-down 302, it produced 120 hp (89 kW), the lowest power ever for a Mustang V8. The 255 was mated only with the three-speed automatic transmission. This meant the 2.3 L Turbo was the sole "performance" engine. Plagued with reliability issues, it was an option until calendar-year 1981 in the United States while it remained available in Canada. An improved version would return in the new-for-1983 Turbo GT.

Appearing first in 1981, the optional Traction-Lok limited-slip differential was compatible with any Mustang powertrain. Additionally, a Tremec five-speed manual option arrived late during the 1980 model year, available only with the 2.3 L four-cylinder engines.

== 1983–1986 ==
While most of the Mustang was carried over in late 1982 for 1983, there were some changes and improvements on the then five-year-old "Fox-platform" model. The front fascia was restyled with a more rounded nose and reshaped grille. New, wider horizontal taillights with dedicated amber turn signals replaced the vertical sectioned units. This was also the first Mustang to use the "Blue Oval" Ford emblem on the exterior, both front and rear. Ford added a convertible to the Mustang line for 1983, after a nine-year absence. The majority of the convertibles were equipped with the new 3.8 L (232 cu in) Essex which replaced the 3.3 L (200 cu in) I6 engine. The small block 302 cu in (4.9 L) V8 engine received a four-barrel carburetor and a new intake manifold, bringing power to 175 hp (130 kW). The 2.3 L four-cylinder Turbo also returned mid-year 1983, now fuel-injected, and producing 145 hp (108 kW). Sales of the Turbo GT were hurt by a higher base price and lower performance than the 4.9 L (302 cu in).

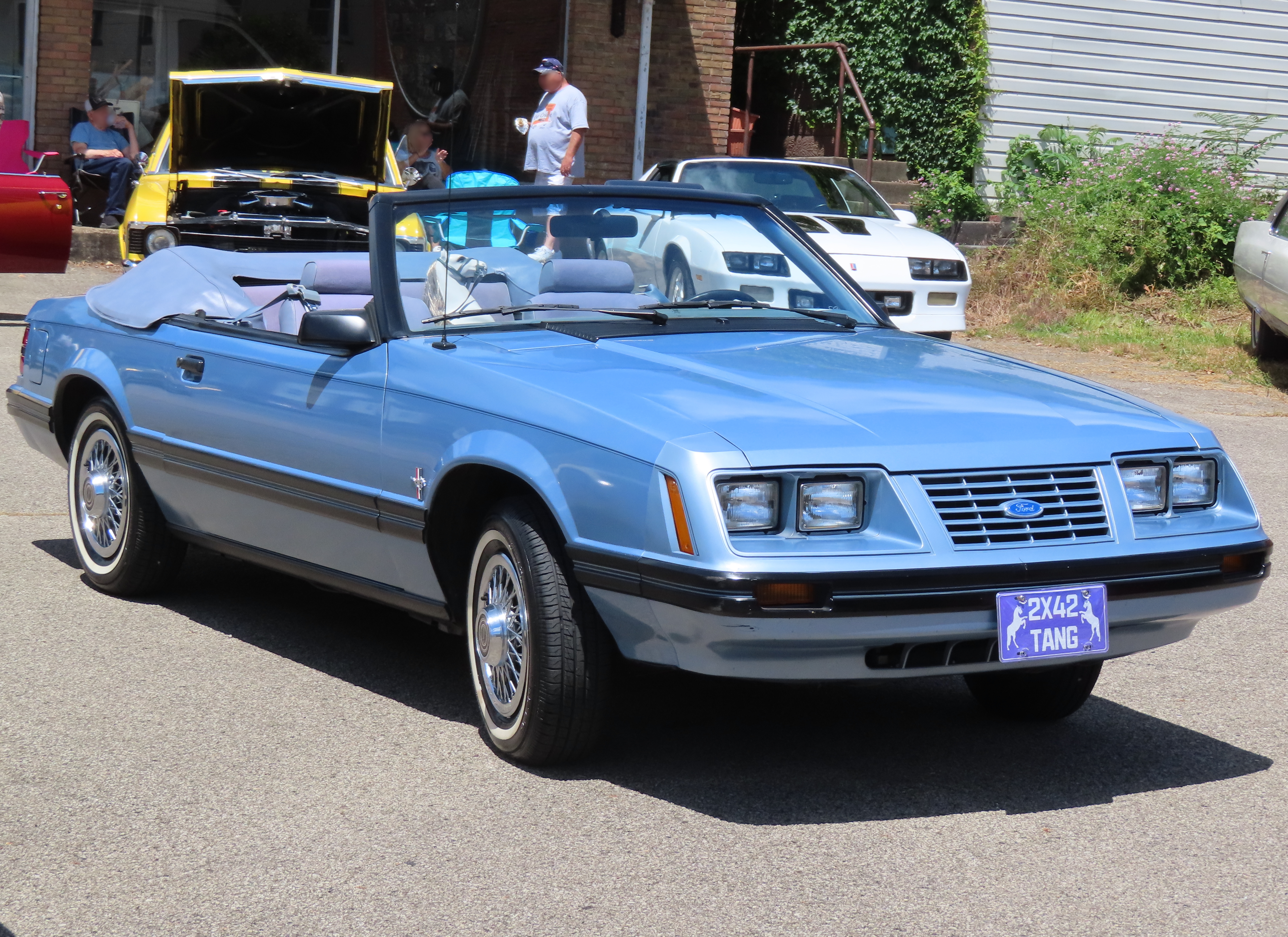
1984 Ford Mustang LX convertible

For 1984, the GL and GLX were dropped, leaving the L, GT, and Turbo GT while adding new additions, the LX and SVO. Ford also recognized the 20th anniversary of the Mustang with the G.T.350, essentially a limited run of GTs and Turbo GTs. A total of 5,261 G.T.350 hatchback and convertible models were built, all trimmed with Oxford White exteriors and Canyon Red interiors. They featured red G.T.350 rocker stripes and tri-bar Pony emblems on the front fenders. Two 302 cu in (4.9 L) V8 engines were available, a carbureted version (with manual transmission only), or a new 165 hp (123 kW) electronically fuel-injected engine (with automatic transmission only). A new "Quadra-Shock" rear suspension, which replaced the slapper bars with horizontally mounted axle shocks, became available after a few months of production. After 1984, the TRX option was retired for the Mustang.

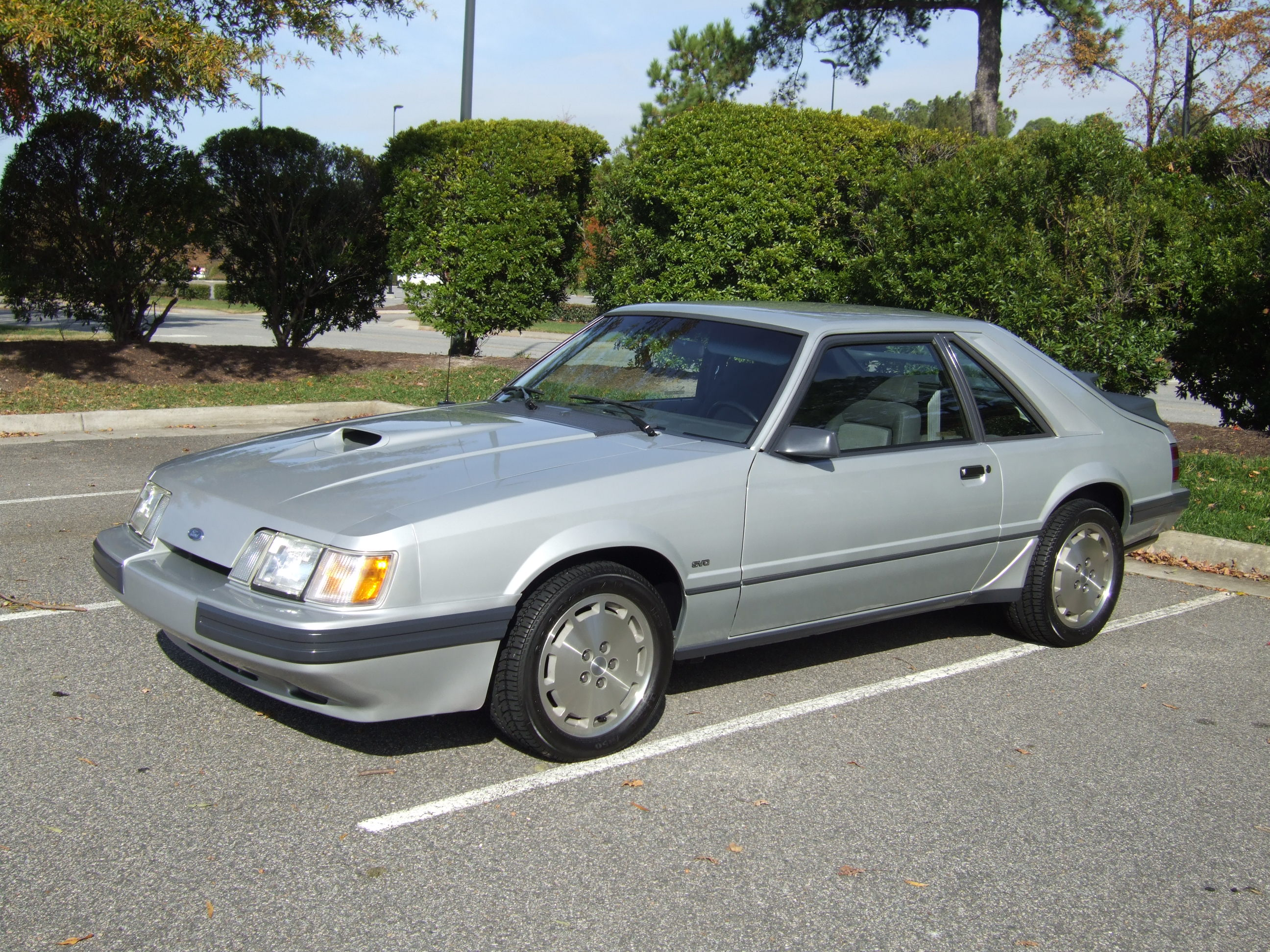
1986 Mustang SVO

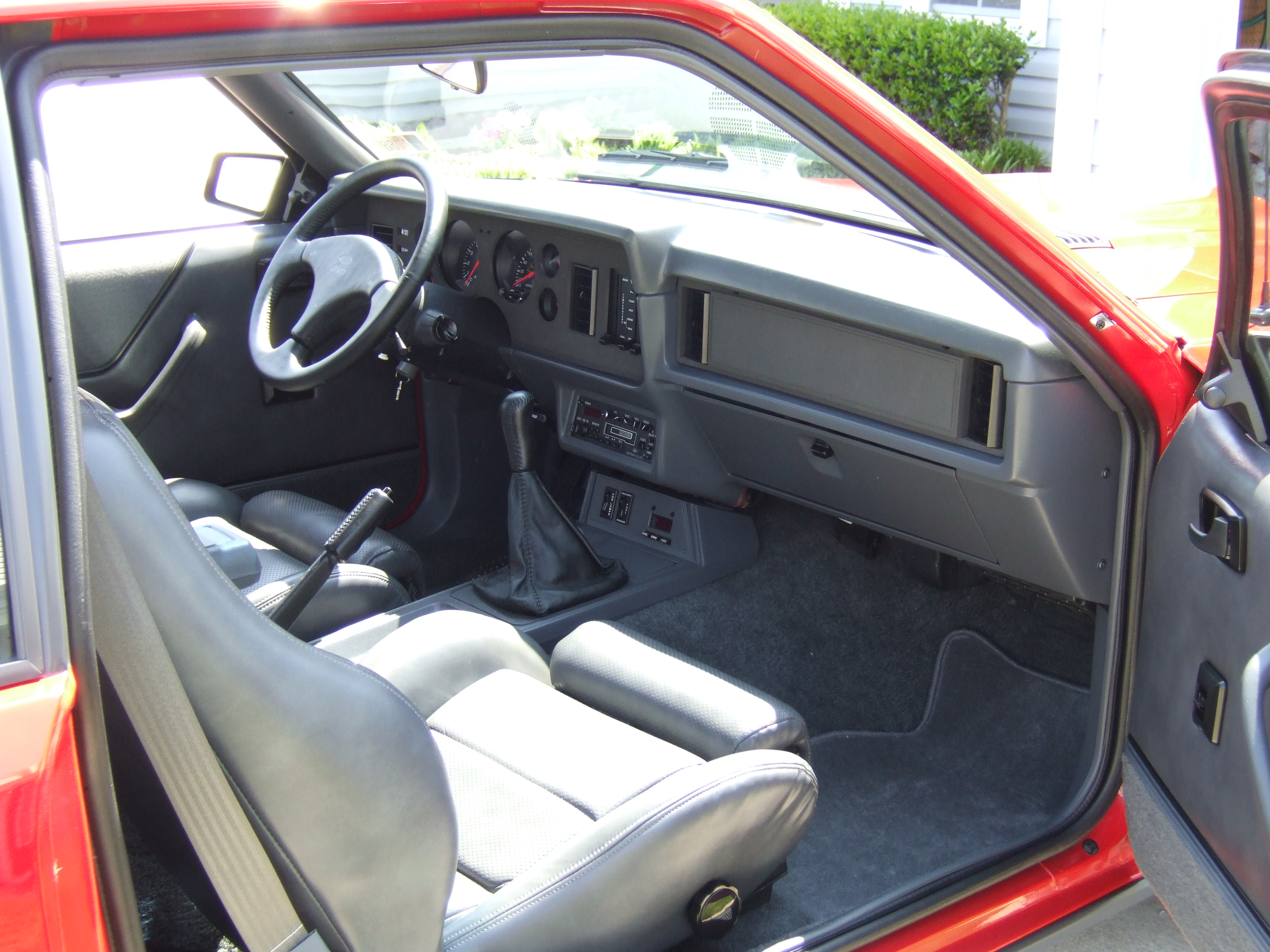
1986 Mustang SVO interior

The new Mustang SVO appeared first in 1984 and was produced through 1986. The 2.3 L turbocharged inline-four produced initially 175 hp (130 kW) for 1984, uprated to 205 hp (153 kW) beginning halfway through the 1985 model year, and ending with 200 hp (149 kW) for 1986. Four-wheel disc brakes, 16-inch wheels, and an SVO-specific bi-plane rear spoiler were a few of the differences between the SVO and the rest of the Mustang line. The unique front fascia featured an offset hood intake duct for the turbo intercooler and a grille-less nose with sunken single rectangular sealed beam headlamps, flush inboard parking lamps, and wraparound outer turn-signal lamps. The front end was intended to use flush aerodynamic composite headlamps with replaceable bulbs, but the US DOT had not approved these in time for production. Aero headlamps finally appeared on the 1985½ SVO.

Hagerty (Insurance), specializing in classic cars, calls the introduction of the first 200 hp (149 kW; 203 PS) Mustang in 1985 the end of the Malaise era in American auto design. Although, most enthusiasts agree that the 1982 Mustang GT with its new 5.0 HO engine package, was the car that signaled the end of that era.

For 1985, the front fascia was restyled with a grille-less nose with a horizontal air intake slot. The Mustang GT received new E5AE cylinder heads, a revised Holley four-barrel carburetor, a new and more aggressive roller camshaft (only in models with the manual transmission), less restrictive exhaust manifolds, and a pseudo-dual exhaust which brought more power to a conservatively rated 210 hp (157 kW) engine. This would be the last carbureted V8 in the Mustang. The 1985 model year dropped the L and Turbo GT, leaving the LX, GT, and SVO models. For 1986, Ford released the first multiport fuel-injected 302 cu in (4.9 L) V8, rated at 200 hp (149 kW; 203 PS).

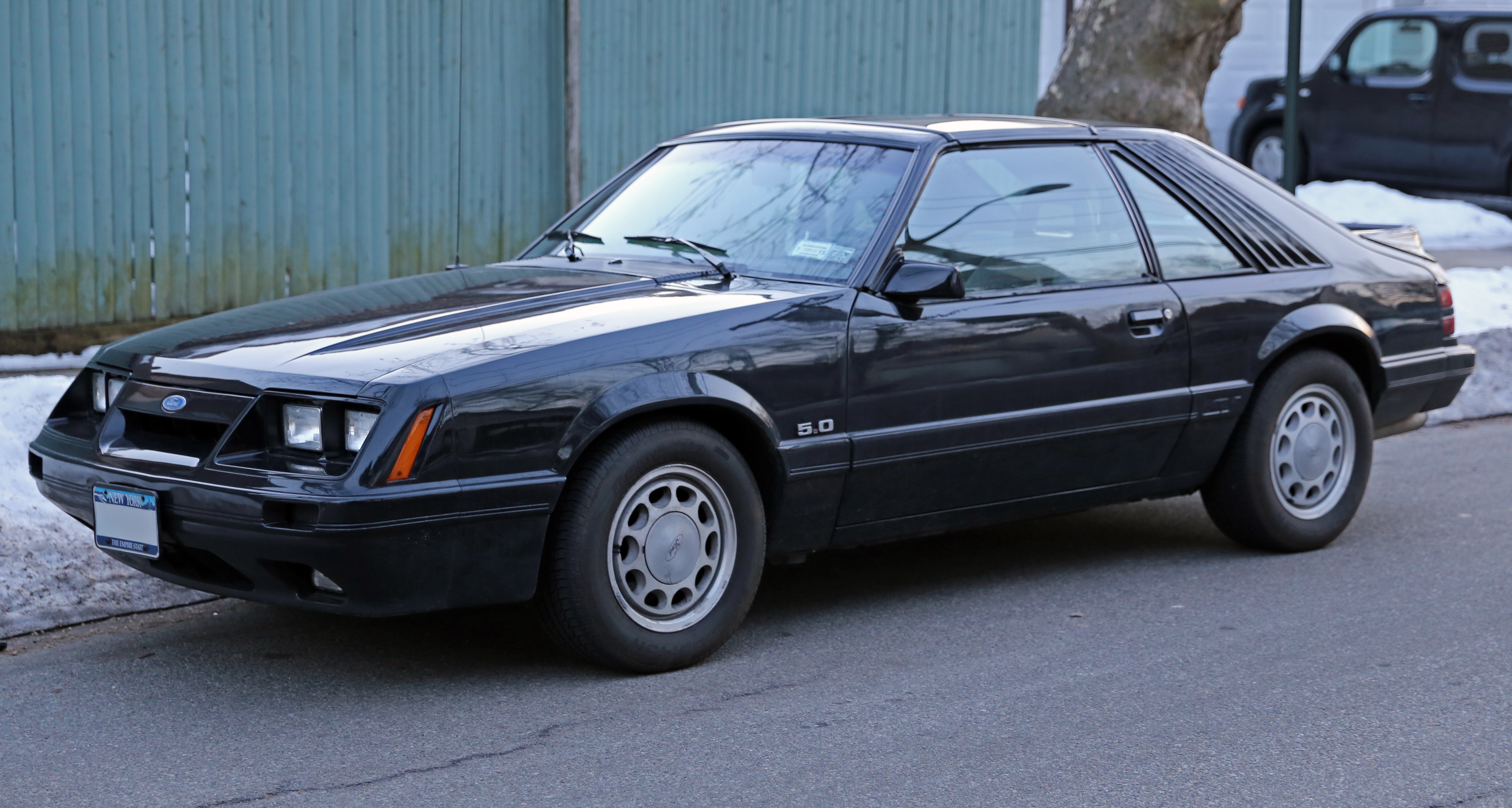
1986 Ford Mustang GT T-top

In 1986, the Mustang GT saw drivetrain upgrades including a new 10.5-inch (upgraded from 10") clutch. A 7.5-inch rear-end continued in 2.3, 2.3 turbo, and 3.8 L applications, but 302 cu in (4.9 L) models included a new 8.8-inch unit. Central fuel injection was used on the non-turbo 2.3 L in automatic versions, but was dropped the following year and replaced with a more efficient multi-port fuel injection. The rear center high-mounted brake light was now mounted on the now-standard rear spoiler for hatchbacks, inside the bottom of the rear window of the coupe, and on the rear edge of the standard luggage rack on convertibles.

=== Engines ===
Engines for the 1983–1986 models included the 2.3 L, the 2.3 L turbo — now fuel-injected and available only in the Turbo GT and SVO, the 3.8 L Essex V6, and the High Output (H.O.) 302 cu in (4.9 L) V8 engine, with a new four-barrel carburetor made by Holley. The 3.3 L straight-six engine was dropped after the 1982 model year.

Mustang High Output (H.O.) 5.0 L horsepower ratings by year
Year	Power	Torque	Induction	Transmission	Note
1983	175 hp (130 kW) at 4200 rpm	245 lb⋅ft (332 N⋅m) at 2400 rpm	4V carb	SROD or T-5	
1984	165 hp (123 kW) at 3800 rpm	245 lb⋅ft (332 N⋅m) at 2000 rpm	EFI (CFI)	AOD	
	175 hp (130 kW) at 4200 rpm	245 lb⋅ft (332 N⋅m) at 2400 rpm	4V carb	T-5	
1985	165 hp (123 kW) at 3800 rpm	245 lb⋅ft (332 N⋅m) at 2000 rpm	EFI (CFI)	AOD	through 11/19/84
	180 hp (134 kW) at 3800 rpm	245 lb⋅ft (332 N⋅m) at 2000 rpm	EFI (CFI)	AOD	after 11/19/84
	210 hp (157 kW) at 4400 rpm	270 lb⋅ft (366 N⋅m) at 3200 rpm	4V carb	T-5	
1986	200 hp (149 kW) at 4000 rpm	285 lb⋅ft (386 N⋅m) at 3000 rpm	SEFI	AOD or T-5	

=== Transmissions ===
Transmission availability varied behind the H.O. 302 cu in (4.9 L) each year. The Tremec four-speed manual overdrive (SROD) carried over from the 1982 model year and was the standard transmission behind the 302 in 1983. Shortly after the 1983 model year started, the "standard duty" Borg Warner five-speed manual overdrive transmission (T-5) became available and it was then the standard transmission behind the 302 engine, with the SROD becoming optional — with an invoice credit — for the remainder of the model year. For the 1984 model year, the four-speed automatic overdrive (AOD) transmission became available for the first time in the Mustang model line, and it was available behind the 302 engine only with throttle-body electronic fuel injection (called 'Central Fuel Injection' or CFI). The T-5 was still available with the 4V carb induction system. For the 1985 model year, the Borg-Warner T-5 transmission was upgraded by Borg-Warner to "Heavy Duty" status, also known as "World Class". The WC T-5 was still only available with the 4V induction system. The AOD transmission was also still only available with CFI induction carried over from 1984 but shortly after the model year started it received the exhaust system from the 4V/T-5 engine, and a 15 hp increase. In 1986 the H.O. 302 cu in (4.9 L) engine was now sequentially fuel-injected (SEFI), and was available with either automatic or manual transmissions.

=== Motorsport ===
The Mustang became Ford's main challenger in the early years of Group A touring car racing in Europe and Australia. However, the 302 cu in (4.9 L) V8 engine was not a contender in the various European championships and was replaced in 1985 by the turbocharged Ford Sierra XR4Ti.

Australian Dick Johnson Racing purchased two Mustangs built by Zakspeed in mid-1984 for use through 1985 and 1986 Australian Touring Car seasons as Ford Australia did not homologate either the Australian built Ford XE Falcon or its replacement, the XF Falcon, for racing. Johnson had a race win in the Group A support race for the 1985 Australian Grand Prix, as well as several placings in the 1985 and 1986 Australian Touring Car Championships. The Mustang's competitive life in Group A came to an end at the end of 1986 and was replaced in 1987 by the European-designed turbocharged Ford Sierra RS Cosworth.

== Mexico ==
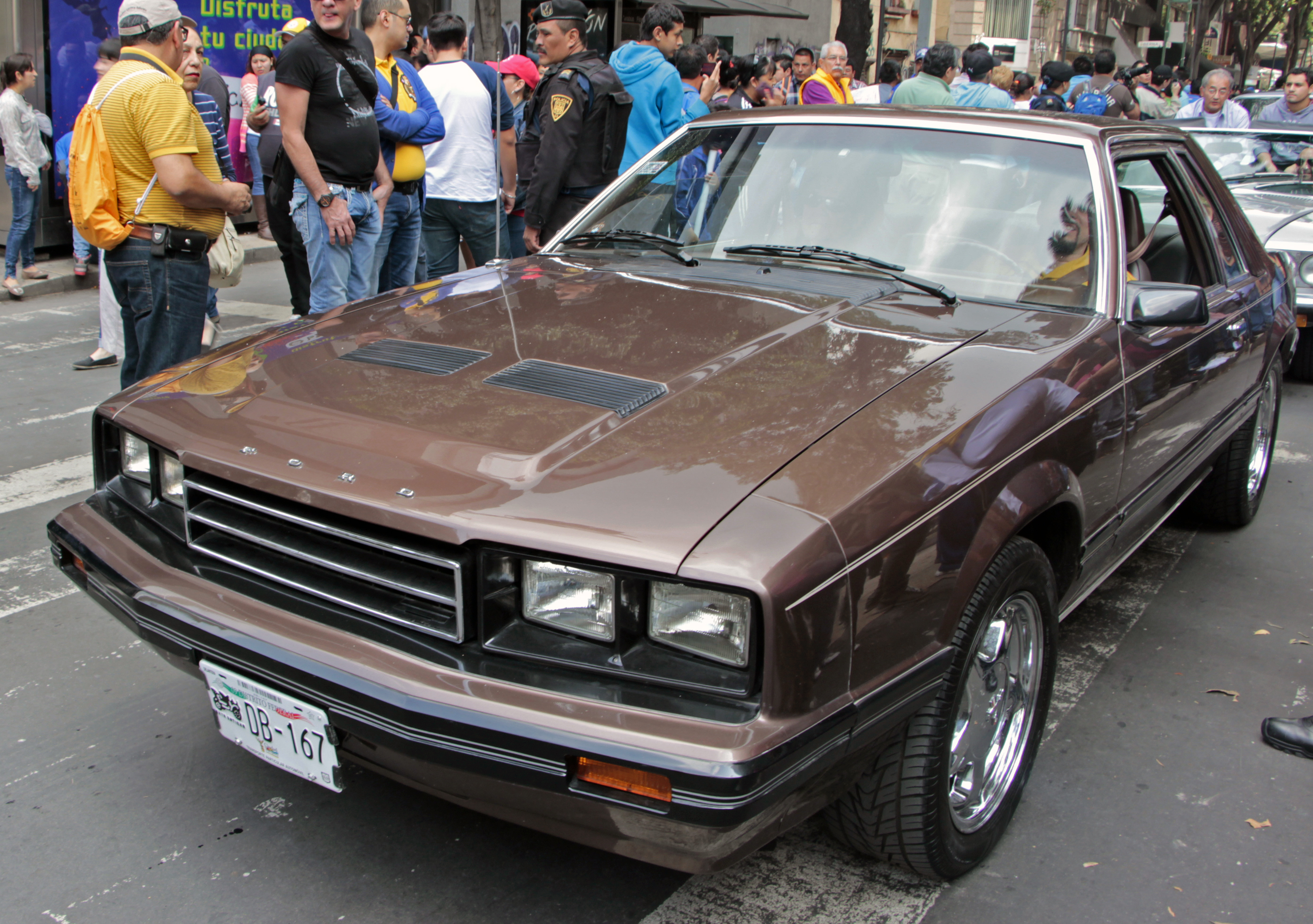
1983 Ford Mustang coupé, Mexican market version

The Fox body Mustang was manufactured in Ford's Cuatitlan Itzcalli plant (located in Mexico City) from 1979 to 1984. Both the coupe and the hatchback body styles were offered. These Mexican-built Mustangs had a hybrid appearance from 1981 until 1984, using some Mercury Capri body parts.

=== 1979–1982 ===
The 1981 and 1982 models (coupe and hatchback) received horizontally ribbed Capri taillights, plus a Capri front fascia for the 1982 model.

=== 1983–1984 coupe ===
The 1983 model had a Capri front fascia, whereas the 1984 model had the standard Mustang front fascia. A 1984 SVO coupe was also offered complete with SVO taillights.

=== 1983–1984 hatchback ===
The Capri body style was used for the 1983–1984 hatchback models which featured a "bubble" glass hatch liftgate, Capri taillights, and Capri wide fenders, although 1984 models had the regular Mustang front fascia. An SVO option was available for the 1984 model.

== Proposed replacement ==
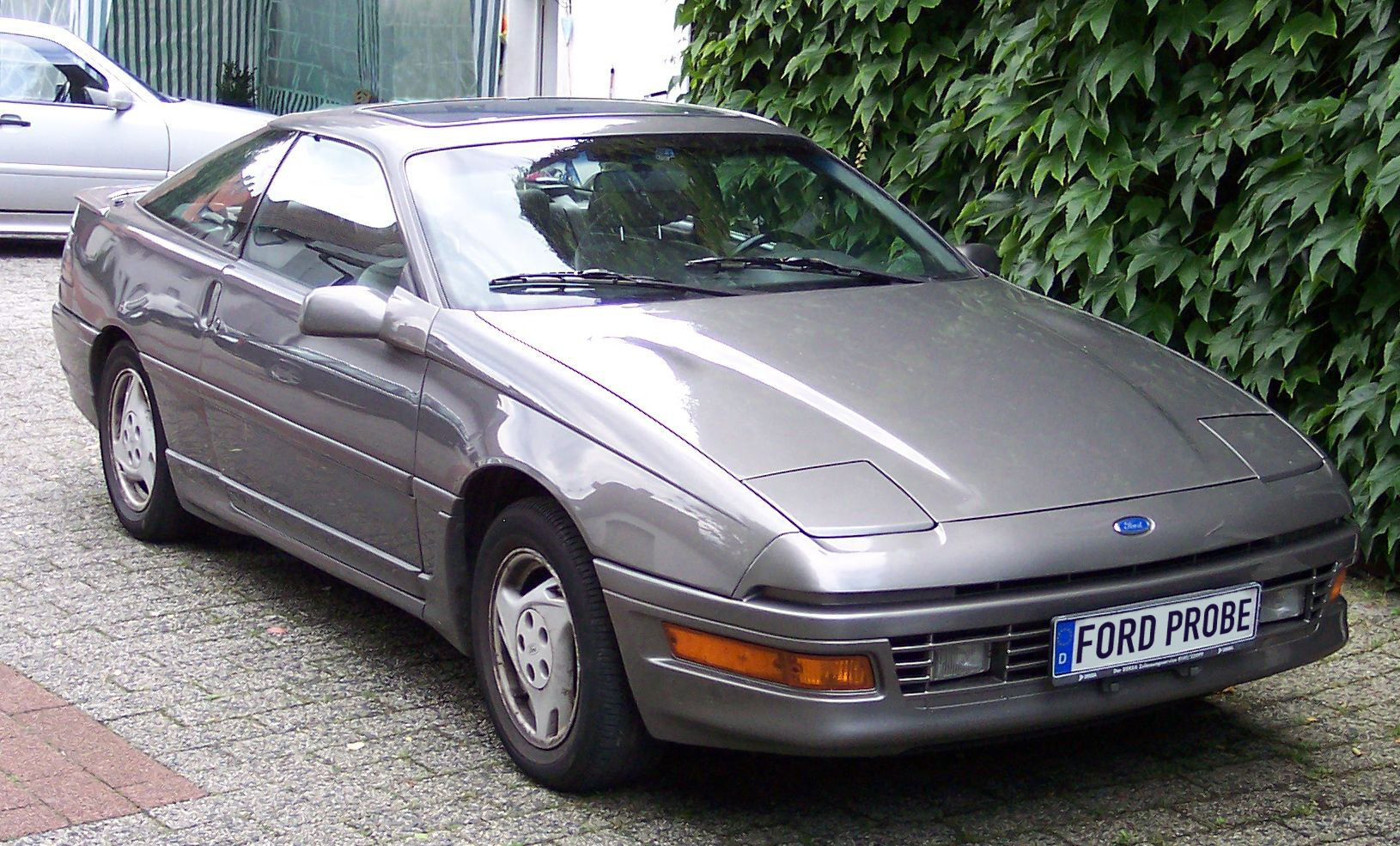
Ford Probe

By the mid-1980s, Mustang sales were slumping. Sales were over 100,000 units a year, but were minimal compared to previous numbers. Ford believed that the Mustang had lost its place in the market. They subsequently announced that they would replace the rear-wheel drive Mustang with a Mazda-derived front-wheel-drive version. Mustang fans quickly responded and sent Ford hundreds of thousands of letters, asking them to continue production of the rear-wheel drive Mustang. Ford responded by continuing production of the rear-wheel drive Mustang, and proceeded to rename the front-wheel-drive version as the Probe, which ended up being a replacement for the Escort-based Ford EXP.

== 1987–1993 ==
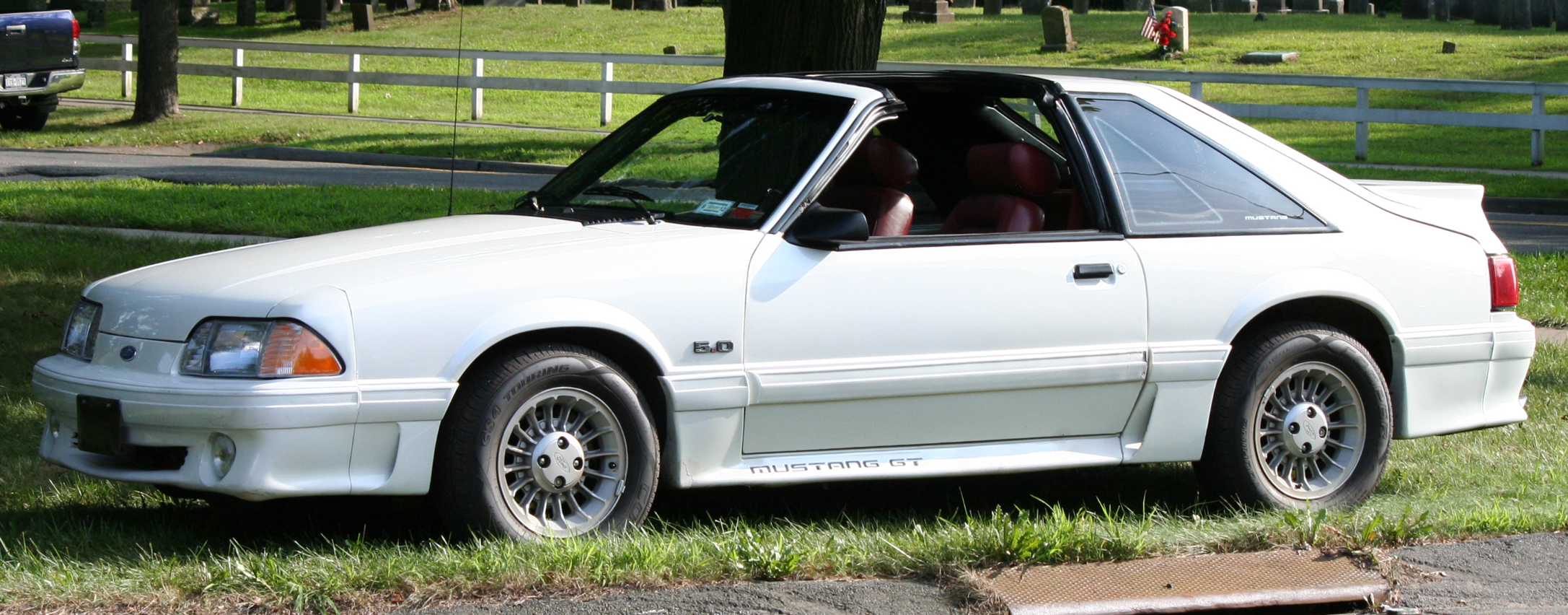
Ford Mustang GT T-top

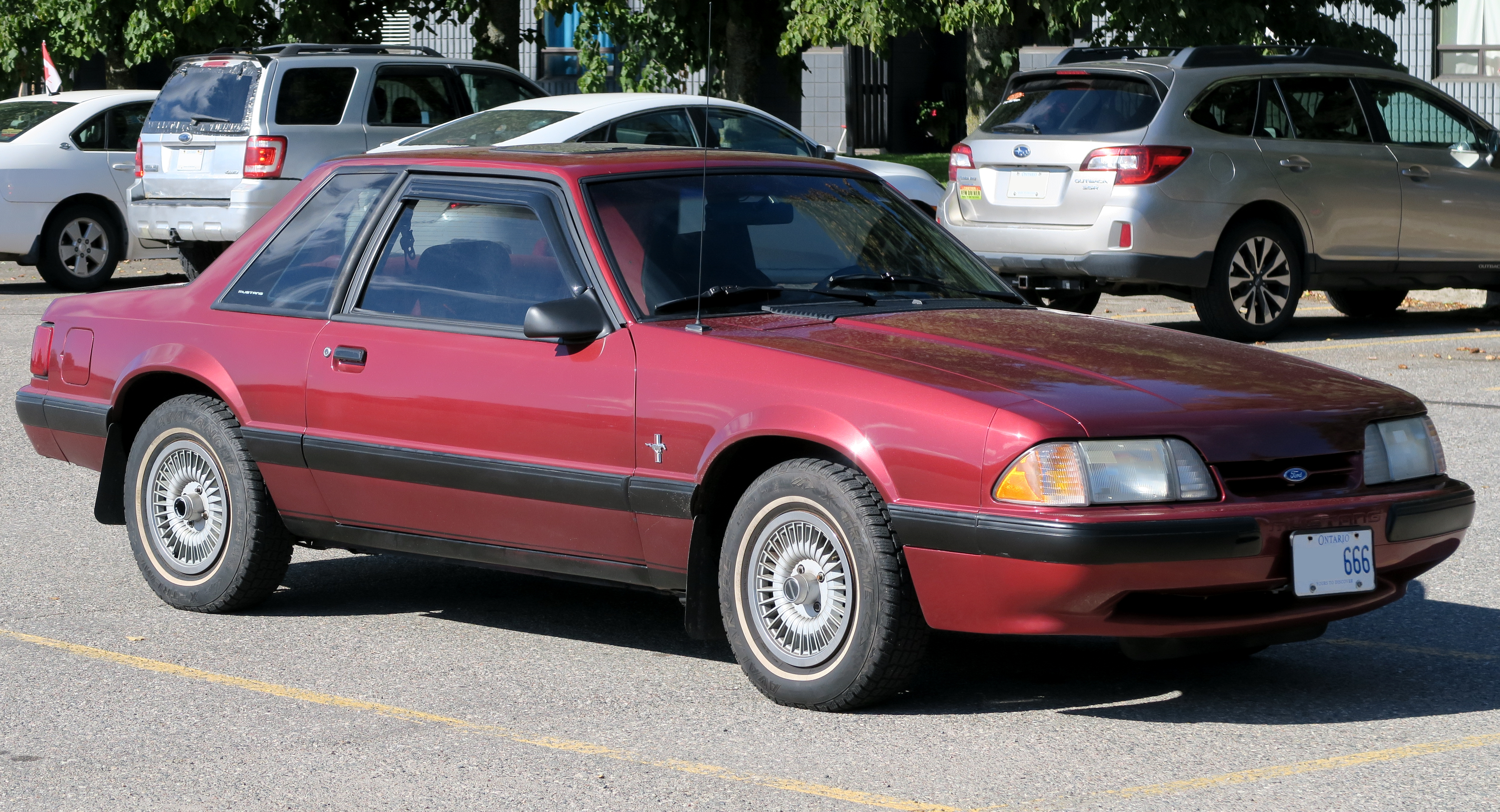
1990 Ford Mustang LX Coupe

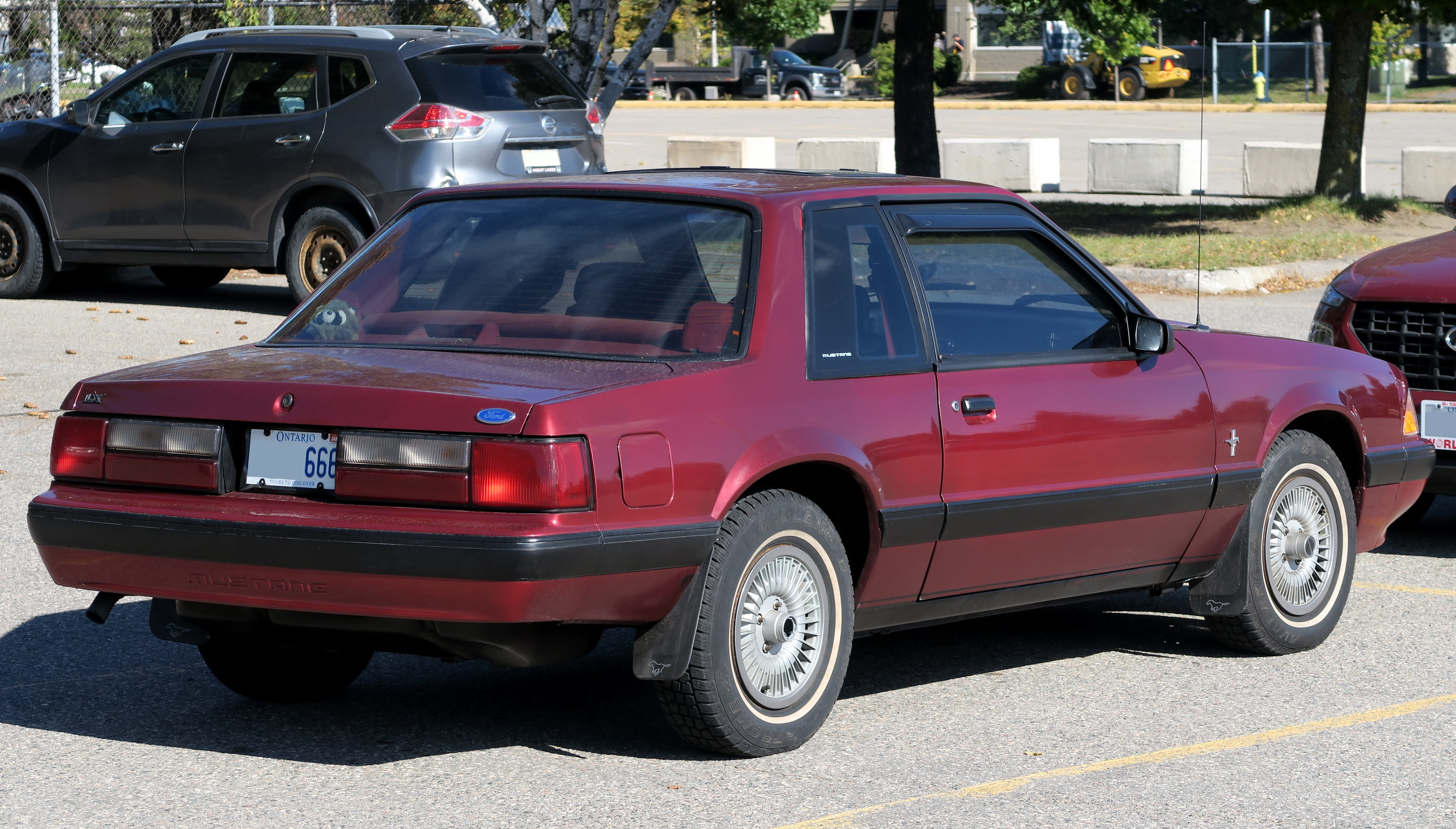
1990 Ford Mustang LX Coupe rear

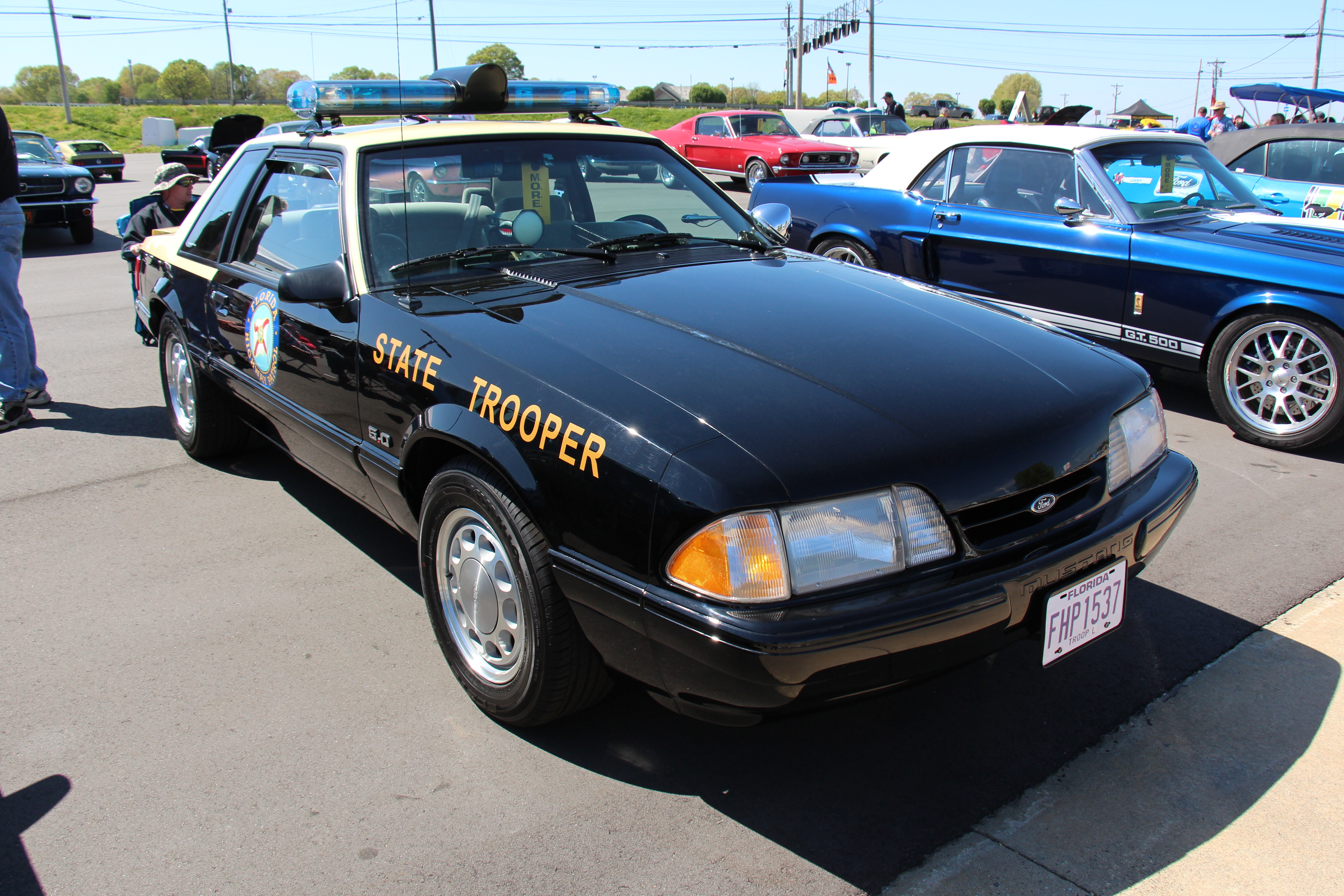
1992 Ford Mustang SSP used by the Florida Highway Patrol

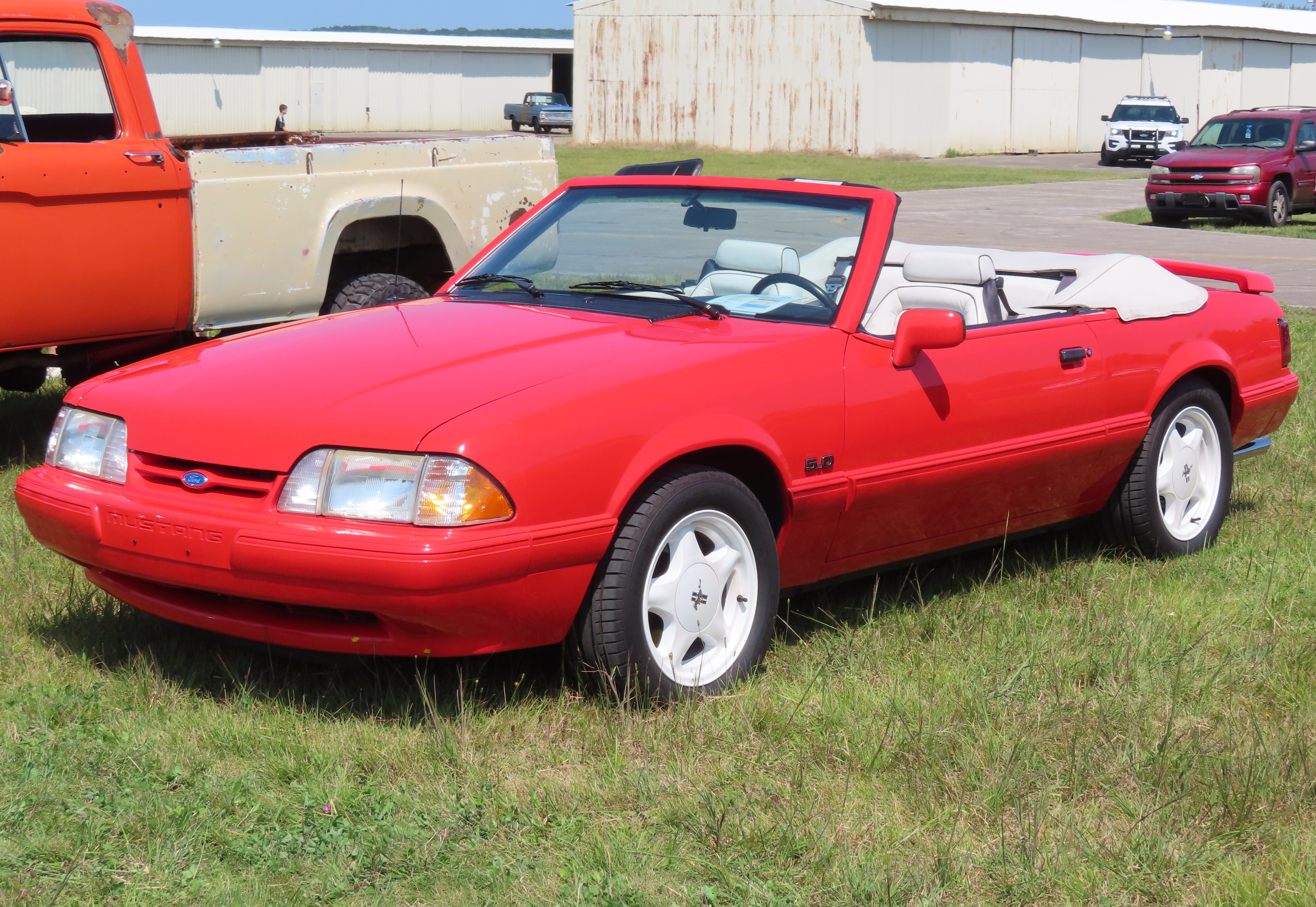
1992 Ford Mustang LX 5.0 L Summer Edition

In August 1986, the Mustang received a facelift for the 1987 model year on both the interior and exterior. The front end was restyled to look more like the SVO which gave the car more of an "Aero" look, in keeping with Ford's overall modern styling direction. The interior received an all-new dash, center console, and revised seat and door trim. With the SVO discontinued, models were now pared down to LX and GT. Taillights on the LX were revised with clear lenses for the turn signals while the GT now wore specific body-colored triple-louvered lenses. The quarter glass windows lost their louvers and now sported a single larger flush piece of glass lettered with "Mustang" at the bottom rear corners. The GT models featured new round fog lamps and gained aerodynamic lower bodyside skirting as well as new turbine style 15-inch (380 mm) wheels. The 302 cu in (4.9 L) Mustangs became popular with the aftermarket performance industry. The V6 option was discontinued while the 2.3 L four-cylinder gained fuel injection, leaving only the 2.3 L four-cylinder and the 302 cu in (4.9 L) V8.

V8-powered Mustangs received E7TE heads and forged aluminum pistons with valve reliefs in 1987, as opposed to the flat-tops used in the previous year. The E7 cylinder heads were sourced from the truck line after the 1986 swirl-port design demonstrated performance problems. Power ratings increased to 225 hp (168 kW) and 300 ft⋅lbf (410 N⋅m) of torque. No major changes were seen for 1988, although the T-top roof option for hatchbacks was discontinued midyear.

For 1989, the Mustang's speed density computer system was replaced with a mass air system (1988 Mustangs sold in California also had the MAF system). This change slightly reduced factory horsepower, but it made Mustangs much easier to modify. With the mass air system, changes made to the intake, engine, and exhaust system would be recognized and compensated for by the ECU, resulting in a correct air/fuel ratio and optimum power. Ford's only gesture at a 25th Anniversary Mustang was a small, passenger-side dashboard emblem with a galloping-horse logo affixed to all models built between 27 March 1989, and the end of the 1990 model year. Finally, in 1989, Ford resources began to focus on the next Mustang, due to debut in late 1993. Through its retirement in 1993, there would be few changes in the model line, but the changes would be visual.

For 1990, Mustang added a new steering wheel featuring an airbag, and a revised lower driver's-side dash panel with knee bolster. The available tilt-steering wheel, however, was discontinued in favor of the revised airbag-equipped steering column. A limited run of 4.9 L (302 cu in) equipped LX convertibles — all painted Emerald Green metallic with white convertible tops, Oxford White leather interiors featuring GT seats, and 15-inch turbine alloy wheels — were produced for an NCAA half-court shot contest, sponsored by soda brand 7-Up, but the event was canceled shortly before it was scheduled to begin. Ford, already having produced 4,103 vehicles (2,743 with the AOD four-speed automatic overdrive, and 1,360 with the T-5 five-speed manual transmission), released them for dealer availability. Revamped interior quarter panels for the 1990 model year did away with the side armrests for rear-seat passengers, but gained large speaker panels. Door map pockets and clear coat paint also became standard for the 1990 Mustang, along with the availability of optional leather interior trim.

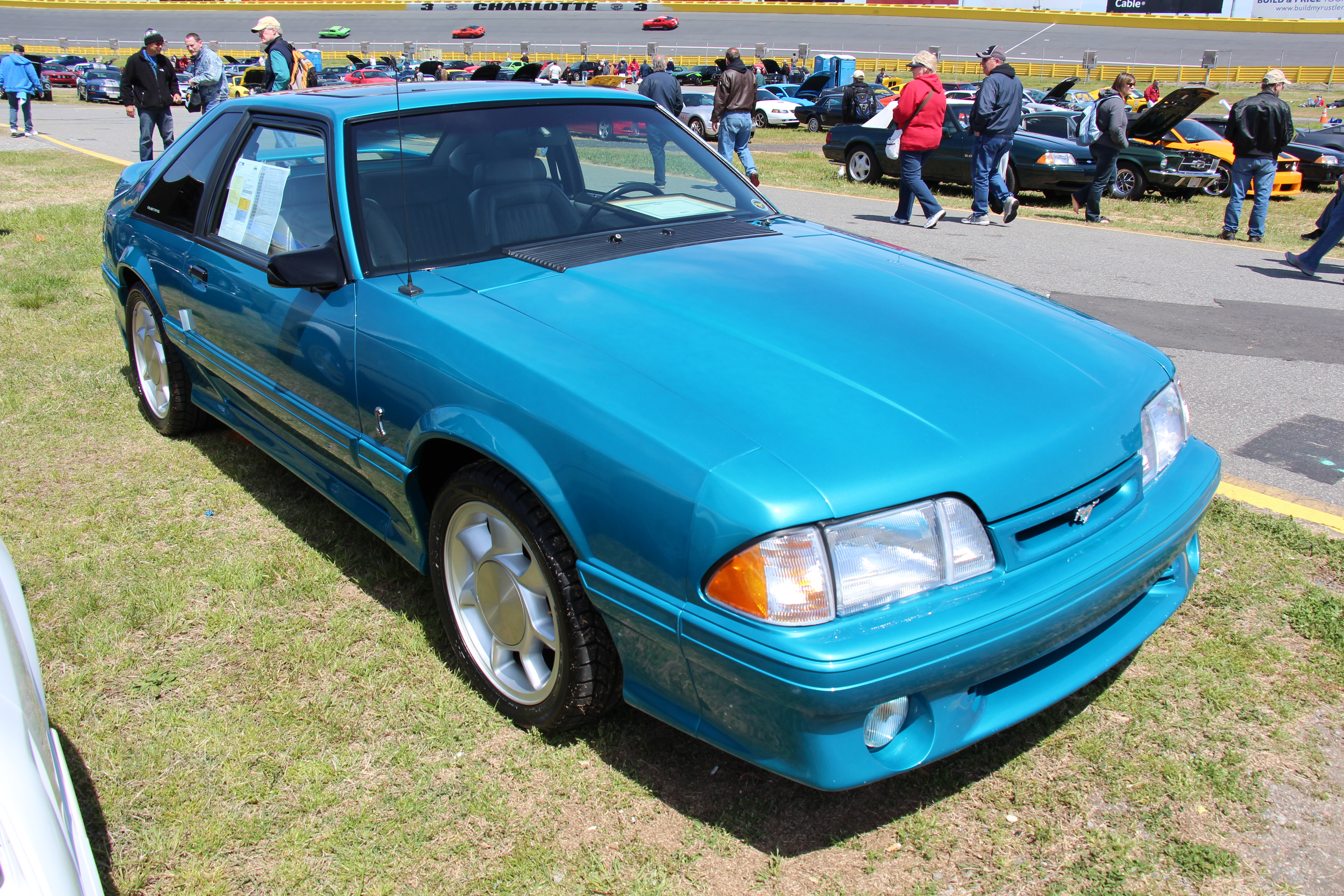
1993 Ford Mustang SVT Cobra hatchback

The 1991 model year changes to the 2.3 L I4 engines included an increase in horsepower (from 88 to 105) due to a revised cylinder head with two spark plugs per cylinder. Base-model Mustang prices exceeded $10,000 for the first time, and sales began to drop. A revised roof for the convertible allowed the top to fold closer to the body. V8-equipped models received new 16-inch five-spoke 'star' alloy rims.

In 1993, Ford switched to cast hypereutectic pistons for all 302 cu in (4.9 L) engines and also re-rated the GT to 205 hp (153 kW) and 275 ft⋅lbf (373 N⋅m) of torque. This estimate was more accurate given the previous power ratings were made before the addition of the mass airflow system, minor revisions in the camshaft profile, and other various small changes made throughout the production run. The individual rear power window switches, mounted within the quarter panel speaker grilles in the back seat of convertible models, were removed. Control for the rear power windows was now relegated to the driver's door switch panel. The black bumper rub strips and side moldings on LX models were now body-colored. Similar to the 1990 7-Up Mustang, for 1992, Ford produced 2,193 special Summer edition (1992-1/2) LX 4.9 L (302 cu in) convertible with a Vibrant Red exterior and Oxford White leather interiors. Also for 1993, Limited Edition models featured a Chrome Yellow exterior with a black or white leather interior, or a Vibrant white exterior with a white leather interior.

Under the newly established Ford SVT division, the 1993 Ford Mustang SVT Cobra was offered with the 302 cu in (4.9 L) V8 that produced 235 hp (238 PS; 175 kW) at 5,000 rpm and 285 lb⋅ft (386 N⋅m) of torque at 4,000 rpm. Featuring more subdued styling than the GT, the Cobra used Ford's new GT-40 high-performance engine equipment. A Cobra R model was also produced for 1993 that used the same engine as the regular Cobra. It featured larger brakes (pulled ahead from the new-for-1994 Mustang Cobra), Koni shocks and struts, engine oil cooler, power steering cooler, and rear seat delete. Options such as air conditioning and a stereo system were not available on the Cobra R. The final third-generation Mustang rolled off the assembly line on 26 August 1993. The 1993 Mustang was the first for a CD player to be optional from the factory. Finally, 1993 also marked the end of the "official" SSP Police/government Mustangs, though some agencies continued buying standard Mustangs for undercover or highway interceptor use.

=== Motorsport ===
Beginning in 1991, several modified Ford Mustang GTs competed in the German DTM series until the end of the car's homologation in 1994. The brothers Gerd and Jürgen Ruch were one such duo that used the Mustangs.

== Production figures ==
Ford Mustang Production Figures
	Notchback	Hatchback	Convertible	Yearly Total
1979	213,017	156,920	-	369,937
1980	152,540	118,782	-	271,322
1981	90,880	91,672	-	182,552
1982	51,144	79,274	-	130,418
1983	33,201	64,234	23,438	120,873
1984	37,680	86,200	17,600	141,480
1985	56,781	84,623	15,110	156,514
1986	*	117,690	*	224,410
1987	58,100	80,717	20,328	159,145
1988	71,890	74,331	33,344	179,565
1989	42,349	105,692	40,518	188,559
1990	17,808	71,798	25,624	115,230
1991	16,846	53,358	20,181	90,385
1992	13,836	36,818	22,546	73,200
1993	23,579	65,220	26,560	115,359
Total	-	1,287,328	-	2,518,948

*For 1986, the total production of notchbacks and convertibles is 106,720. Separate production figures were not provided.

== See also ==
- Ford Mustang variants
- Mercury Capri
- Ford Mustang SVO
- Ford Mustang SVT Cobra
- Ford Mustang SSP
