= Chevrolet Camaro (second generation) =

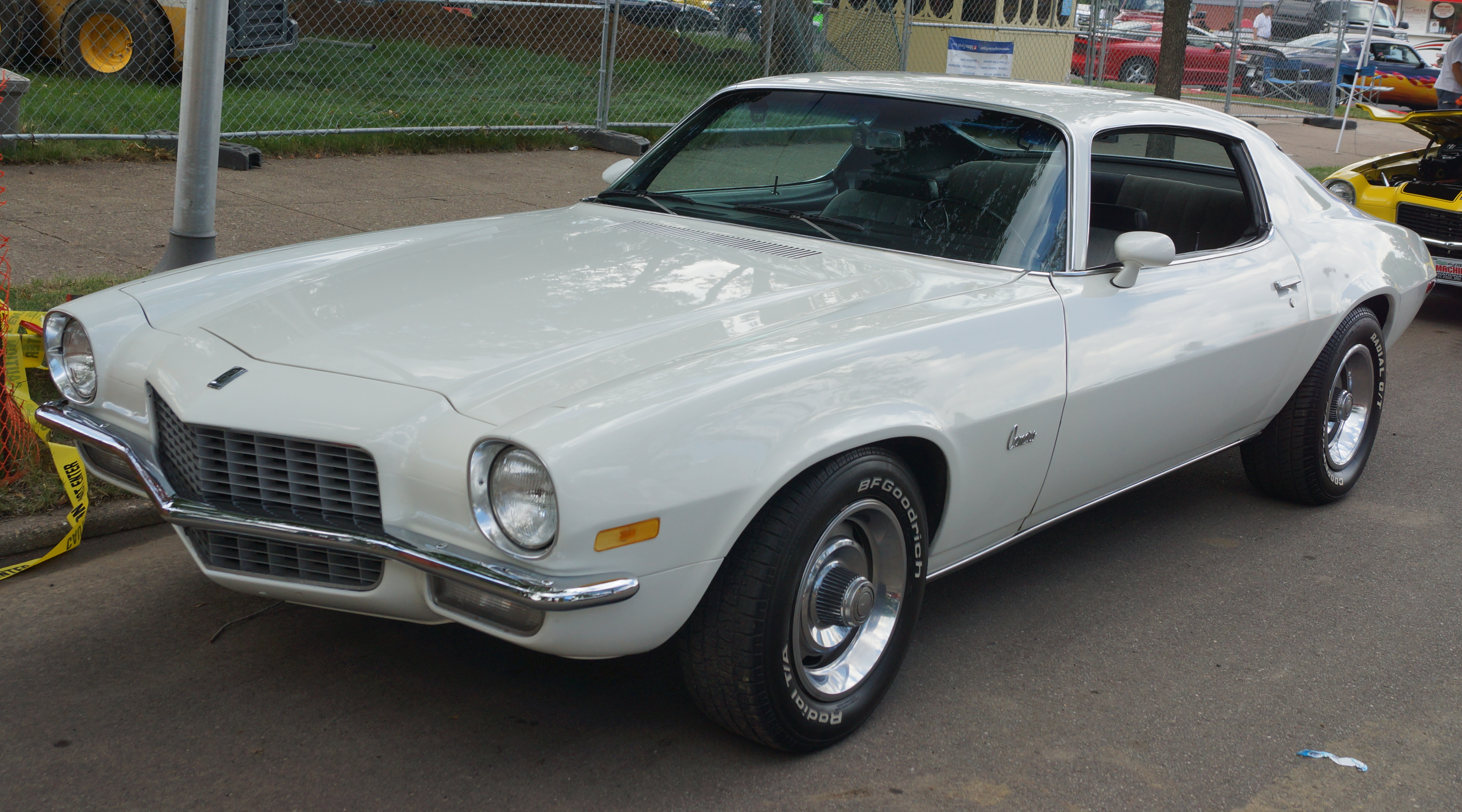
- 1970 Camaro

Overview
- Manufacturer: Chevrolet (General Motors)
- Production: February 1970–1981
- Model years: 1970–1981
- Assembly: United States: Van Nuys, California; United States: Norwood, Ohio; Venezuela: Caracas (1970–1973)
- Designer: Henry Haga

Body and chassis
- Class: Pony car Muscle car
- Body style: 2-door coupe
- Layout: FR layout
- Platform: GM F platform
- Related: Pontiac Firebird (second generation)

Powertrain
- Engine: 229 cu in (3.8 L) Chevrolet 90-degree V6; 230 cu in (3.8 L) Straight-6 I6; 250 cu in (4.1 L) Straight-6 I6; 305 cu in (5.0 L) LG3 V8; 350 cu in (5.7 L) L65 V8; 350 cu in (5.7 L) LM1 V8; 350 cu in (5.7 L) LT-1 V8; 350 cu in (5.7 L) L82 V8; 396 cu in (6.5 L) L78 V8; 400 cu in (6.6 L) Small-block V8
- Transmission: 2-speed or 3-speed automatic 3-speed or 4-speed manual

Dimensions
- Wheelbase: 108 in (2,743 mm)
- Length: 188 in (4,775 mm)
- Width: 74.4 in (1,890 mm)
- Height: 50.1 in (1,273 mm)
- Curb weight: 3,310 lb (1,501 kg)

Chronology
- Predecessor: Chevrolet Camaro (first generation)
- Successor: Chevrolet Camaro (third generation)

The second-generation Chevrolet Camaro is an American pony car produced by Chevrolet from 1970 through the 1981 model years. It was introduced in the spring of 1970. Build information for model 123-12487 was released to the assembly plants in February of that same year. It was longer, lower, and wider than the first generation Camaro. A convertible was no longer available. GM engineers have said the second generation is much more of "a driver's car" than its predecessor. The high-performance Z/28 option remained available through 1975, redesignated as the Z28 in 1972.

== History ==
=== Overview ===
The second-generation Camaro was an all-new car, with its basic mechanical layout familiar and engineered much like its predecessor: a unibody utilizing a front subframe, A-arm and coil spring front suspension, and rear leaf springs.

The chassis and suspension of the second generation were, however, refined in both performance and comfort; base models offered significant advances in sound-proofing, ride isolation, and road-holding. Extensive experience Chevrolet engineers had gained racing the first-generation led directly to advances in second-generation Camaro steering, braking, and balance. High-performance configurations were initially available, but the marketplace changed as 1970s progressed with fuel crisis, higher insurance rates, and tightening emissions regulations. Major styling changes were made in 1974 and 1978; 1981 was the final model year.

=== Models (1970–1981) ===
==== 1970 ====
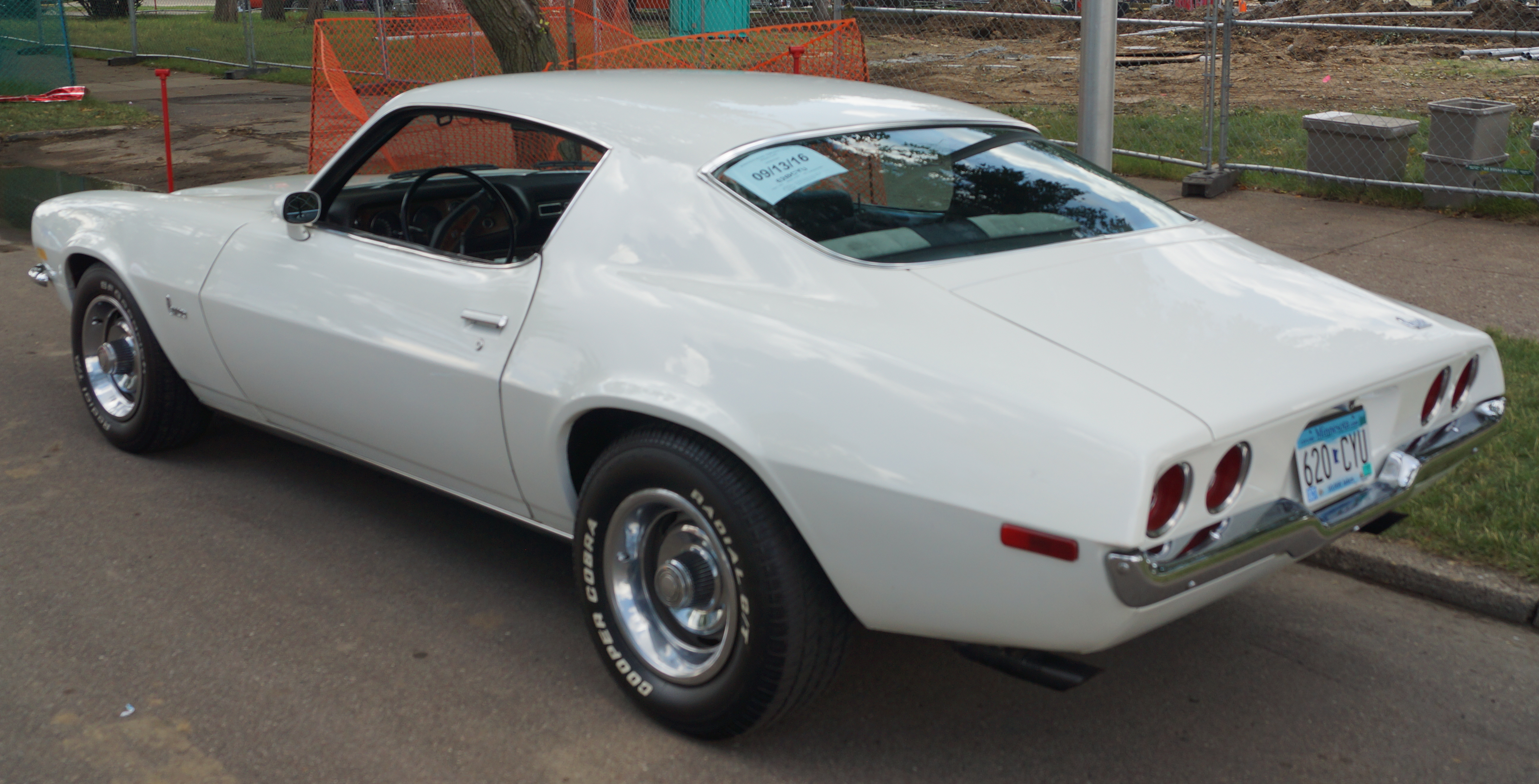
1970 Chevrolet Camaro rear

Most of the engine and drivetrain components were carried over from 1969, with the exception of the 230 cu in (3.8 L) six-cylinder – replaced by the 250 cu in (4.1 L) six, rated at 155 hp (116 kW) – and the 302 cu in (5 L) used exclusively in the first-generation Z/28. The 1970 Camaro SS 396 had the big block 396 cu in (6.5 L) L78 rated at 350 hp (261 kW). Starting in 1970, the nominal "396" actually displaced 402 cu in (6.6 L), yet Chevrolet chose to retain the 396 badging, equipped with a single 4-barrel Holley carburetor that produced 375 bhp (380 PS; 280 kW) at 5,600 rpm and 415 lb⋅ft (563 N⋅m) at 3,600 rpm of torque. Two 454 cu in (7.4 L) engines (the LS6 and LS7) were listed on early specification sheets and in some sales brochures but never made it into production.

Besides the base model, buyers could select the Rally Sport appearance option, with a distinctive nose and bumper and interior upgrades, a Super Sport performance package, and the Z/28 Special Performance Package (priced at US$572.95) featuring a new high-performance LT-1 360 hp (268 kW) 380 lb⋅ft (520 N⋅m) of torque 350 cu in (5.7 L) V8. The LT-1, a Corvette engine built from the ground up using premium parts and components, was a much better performer overall than the smaller Trans-Am racing-derived 302 cu in (5 L) V8s used in 1967-69 Z/28s; greater torque and a less-radical cam, coupled with the 780 cfm Holley four-barrel, permitted the less high-strung new Z/28 to be available with the 3-speed Turbo Hydramatic 400 automatic transmission as an option to the four-speed manual for the first time.

The new body style featured a fastback roofline and ventless full-door glass with no rear side quarter windows. Doors were wider to permit easier access to the rear seat, and new pull-up handles replaced the old handles, for which the lower button had to be pushed in to open the door. The roof was a new double-shell unit for improved rollover protection and noise reduction. The base model featured a separate bumper/grille design with parking lights under the bumper, while the Rally Sport option included a distinctive grille surrounded by a flexible Endura material along with round parking lights beside the headlights and bumperettes surrounding on both sides of the grille. The rear was highlighted by four round taillights similar to the Corvette. A convertible was not offered, making this the only Camaro generation not to offer one.

The 1970 was the first Camaro offered with a rear stabilizer bar. The four-wheel disc brake option (RPO JL8 of 1969) was dropped.

Inside, a new curved instrument panel featured several round dials for gauges and other switches directly in front of the driver while the lower section included the heating/air conditioning controls to the driver's left and radio, cigarette lighter and ashtray in the center and glovebox door on the right. New Strato bucket seats, unique to 1970 models, featured squared-off seatbacks and adjustable headrests, and the rear seating consisted of two bucket cushions and a bench seat back due to the higher transmission tunnel. The optional center console, with standard Hurst shifter, was now integrated into the lower dashboard with small storage area or optional stereo tape player. The standard interior featured all-vinyl upholstery and a matte black dashboard finish, while an optional custom interior came with upgraded cloth or vinyl upholstery and woodgrain trim on dash and console.

The 1970 model was introduced to the assembly plants in February 1970, halfway through the model year. This caused some people to refer to it as a "1970½." model; all were 1970 models. The 1970 model year vehicles are generally regarded as the most desirable of the early second-generation Camaros, since the performance of following years was reduced by the automobile emissions control systems of the period and later the addition of heavy federally mandated bumpers.

==== 1971 ====
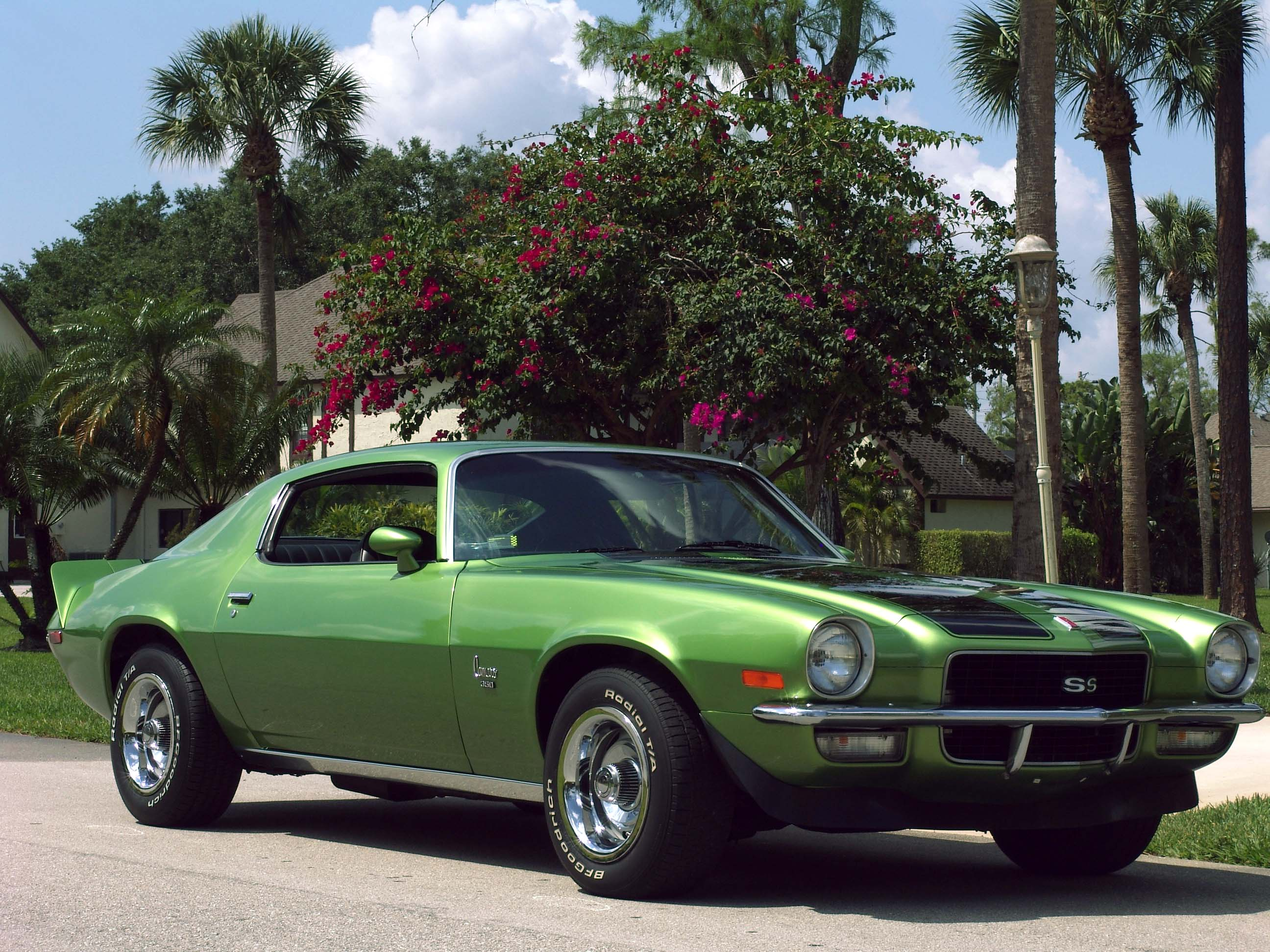
1971 Chevrolet Camaro SS

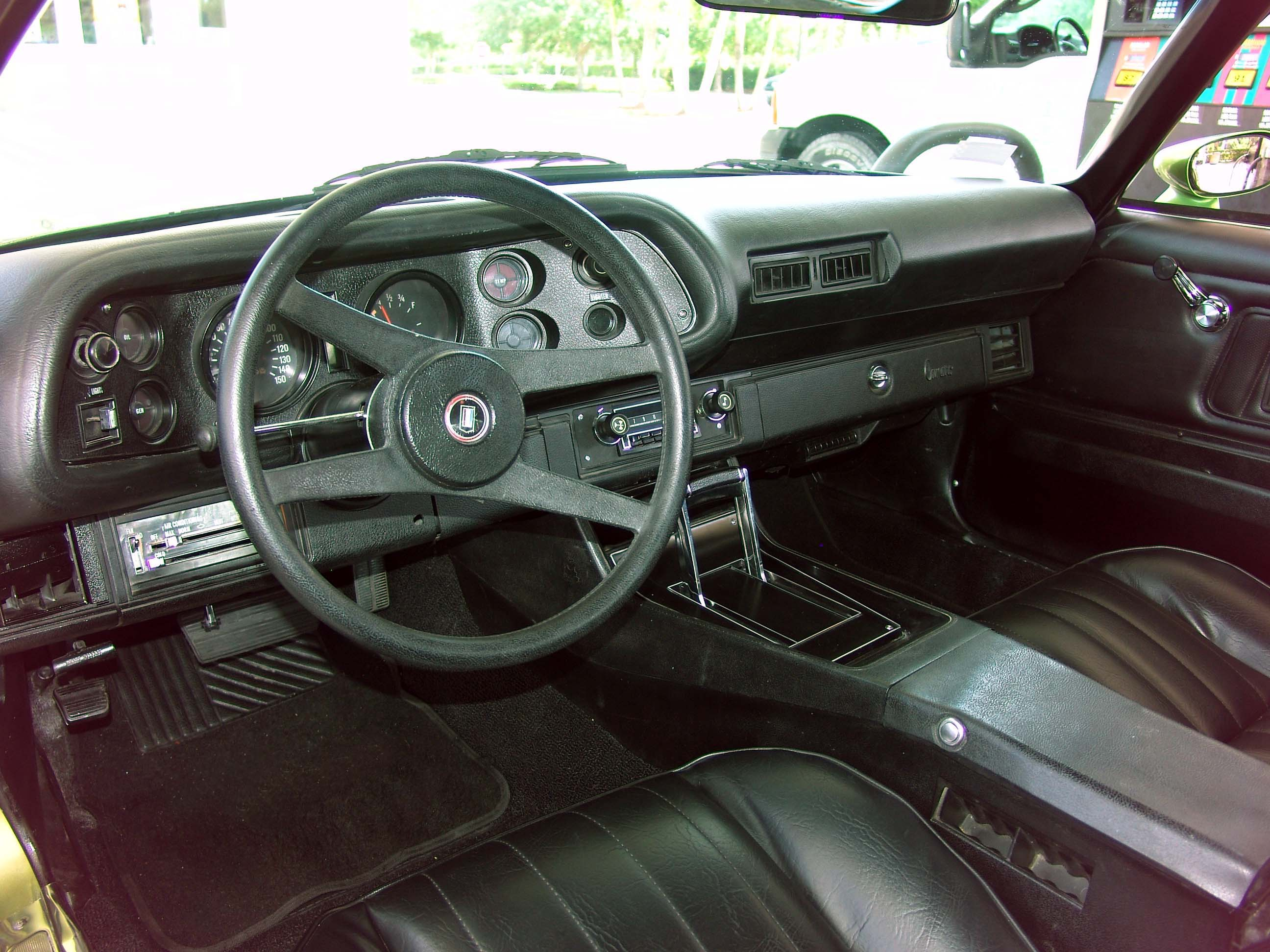
1971 Chevrolet Camaro SS interior

The 1971 Camaro received only minor appearance changes from its 1970 counterpart. Inside, new high-back Strato bucket seats with built-in headrests replaced the 1970-only low-back seats with adjustable headrests. The biggest changes came under the hood, due to an emissions-driven Federal mandate that all engines be designed to run on lower-octane regular-leaded, low-lead, or unleaded gasoline, necessitating reductions in compression ratios and horsepower production. The 250 cu in (4.1 L) straight-6, 307 cu in (5.0 L) V8, and two-barrel 350 cu in (5.7 L) V8 were virtually unchanged, as they were low-compression regular-fuel engines in 1970 and previous years.

The LT-1 350 V8 used in the Z/28 dropped from 360 hp SAE gross to 330 hp (250 kW) SAE gross (275 hp (205 kW) SAE net) due to a compression ratio decrease from 11.0:1 to 10.3:1. The 396 V8 dropped from 350 to 300 hp (220 kW) SAE gross (260 hp (190 kW) SAE net) due to compression ratio drop from 10.25:1 to 8.5:1.

Production and sales dropped due to a 67-day corporate-wide strike at GM that coincided with the introduction of the 1971 models in late September 1970, along with a continued declining interest in the ponycar market fueled by skyrocketing insurance rates for high-performance cars. Rumors of the possible cancellation of the Camaro after 1972 began to surface and were nearly confirmed a year later when another worker's strike hit the assembly plant at Norwood, Ohio, which was the only plant building Camaros and Firebirds.

==== 1972 ====
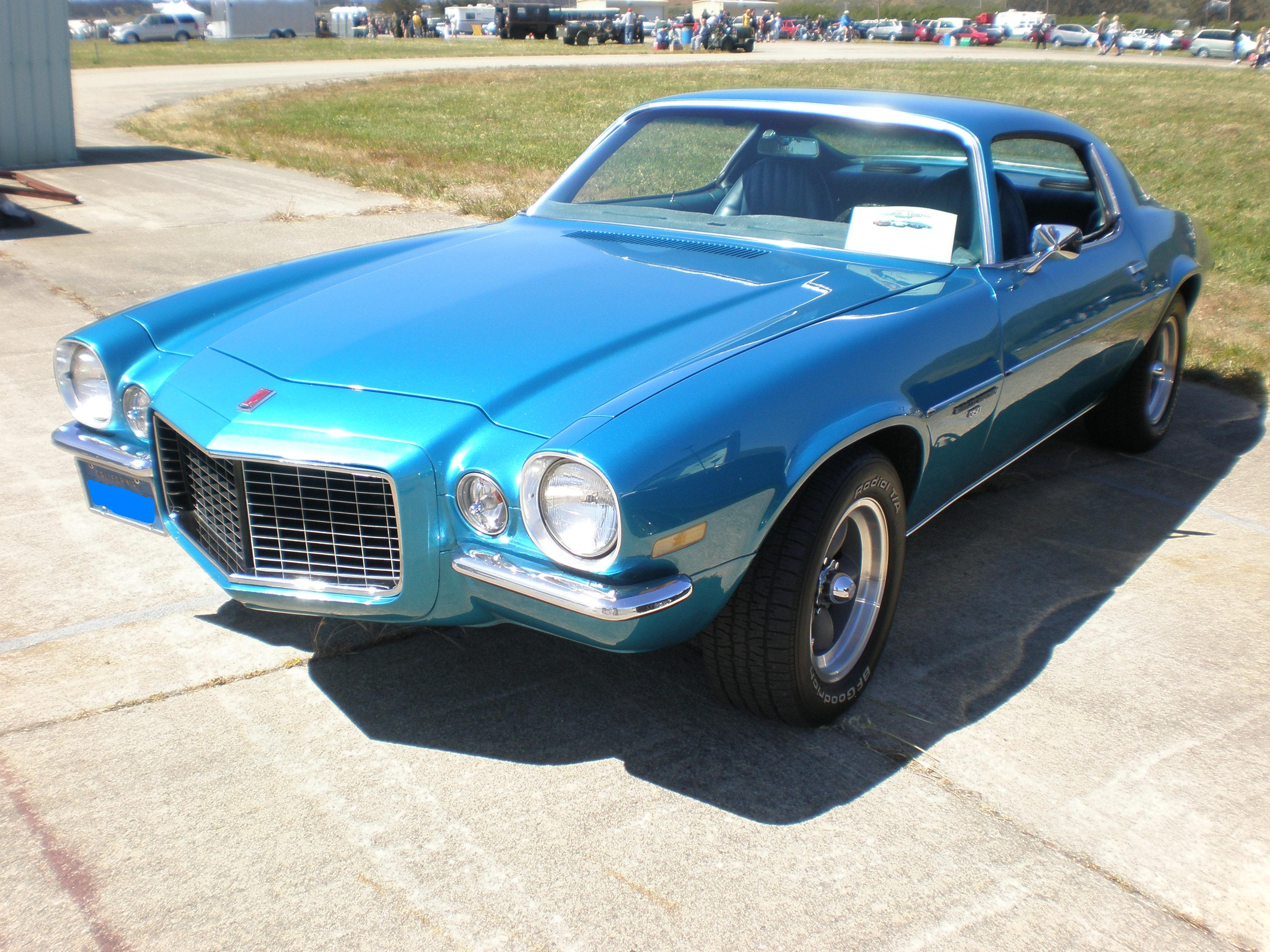
1972 Camaro RS

The 1972 Camaro suffered two major setbacks. The UAW strike at a GM assembly plant in Norwood disrupted production for 174 days, and 1,100 incomplete Camaros had to be scrapped because they could not meet 1973 federal bumper safety standards. Some at GM seriously considered dropping the Camaro and Firebird altogether, particularly while the corporation was under pressure to adapt its vast number of makes and models to difficult new regulations for emissions, safety, and fuel economy. Others pointed out the fiercely loyal followings the cars enjoyed and were convinced the models remained viable. The latter group eventually convinced those in favor of dropping the F-cars to reconsider, and Chevrolet would go on to produce 68,656 Camaros in 1972. Only 970 SS 396s were produced in 1972, and this was the last year for the SS 396 and SS 350 models, as well as the last year the Camaro was offered with a Big Block from the factory. This year the badges changed from "Z/28" to "Z28". Horsepower ratings continued to drop, not only due to lower compression and tighter emissions controls but, beginning with the 1972 model year, a switch from gross to net ratings based on an engine in an actual vehicle with all accessories installed. With that, the 350 ci LT1 dropped from 330 gross horsepower (275 net) in 1971 to 255 net horsepower for 1972 and the 300 gross horsepower (260 net) big-block 396 fell to 240.

==== 1973 ====
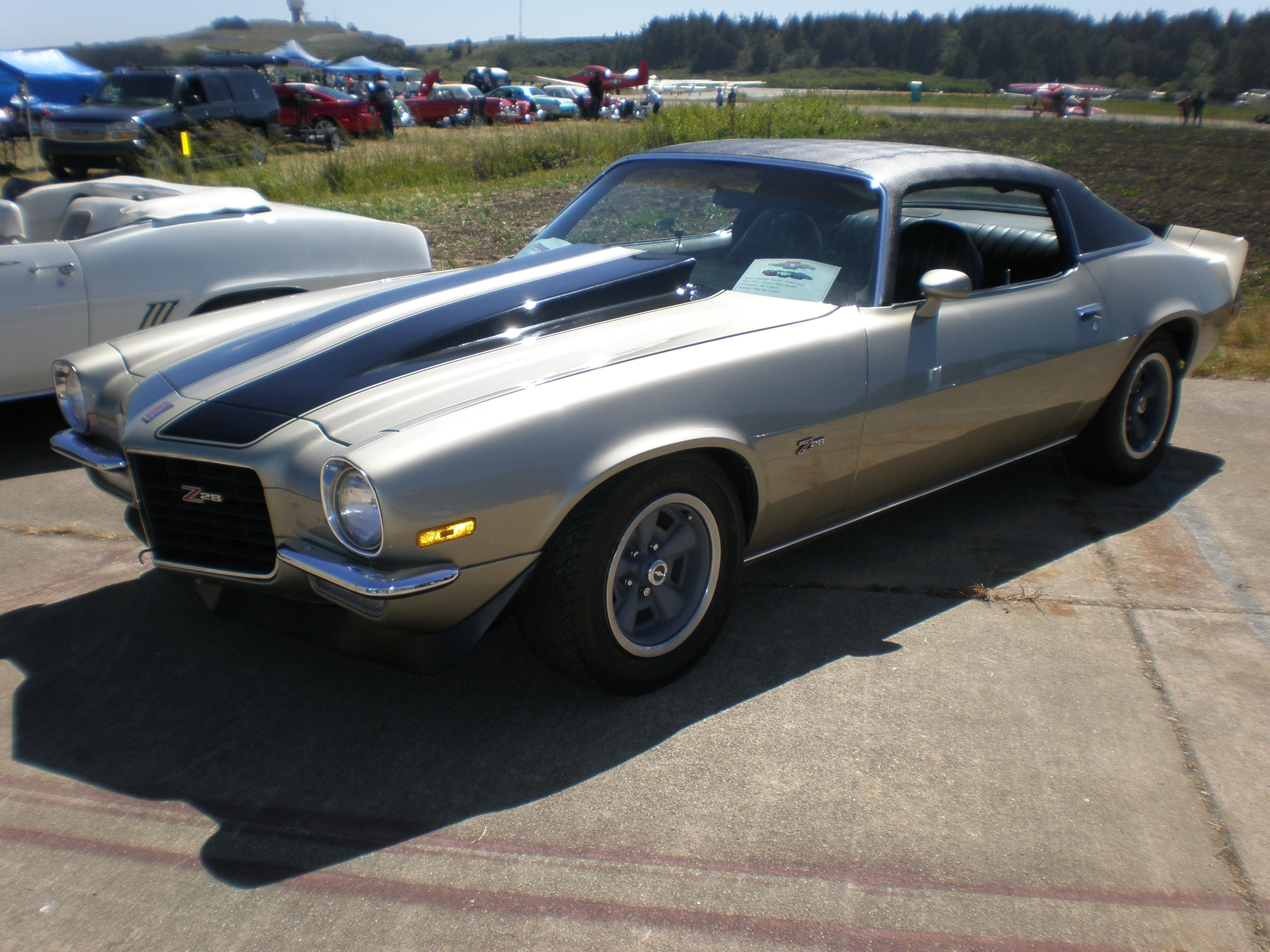
1973 Chevrolet Camaro Z28

The 1973 model year incorporated standard impact-absorbing front bumper system to meet new no-damage standards in 5 miles per hour (8.0 km/h) NHTSA legislation. The Rally Sport option, with its chrome bumperettes on either side of an impact absorbing urethane grille surround, continued for one more year due to creative bracing behind the front sheetmetal.

A new Type LT model was offered in 1973, with a quieter and better-appointed interior, full instrumentation, Rally-style wheels, variable-ratio steering, sport mirrors, and hidden windshield wipers, among other upgrades. The Super Sport package was dropped, and the big block 396 cu in (6.5 L) V8 was no longer available. Power was down due to new emissions standards, with the top-rated 350 cu in (5.7 L) V8 producing 245 hp (183 kW; 248 PS) in the Z28. The engine was switched from solid-lifters to hydraulic lifters, and air conditioning became available as an option. The Z28 option could be ordered on both the sport coupe and LT models. When the Z28 and Type LT options were combined, the usual Z28 badges, stripes, and graphics were deleted.

Other changes included a new console-mounted shifter for automatic transmissions similar to the shifter used in Pontiac Firebirds replacing the Buick-like horseshoe shifter of previous Camaros, and the reintroduction of power windows to the option list for the first time since 1969, with the switches mounted in the console.

Recovering from the strike, Camaro sales increased to 96,751 units during a record sales year industry-wide.

==== 1974 ====
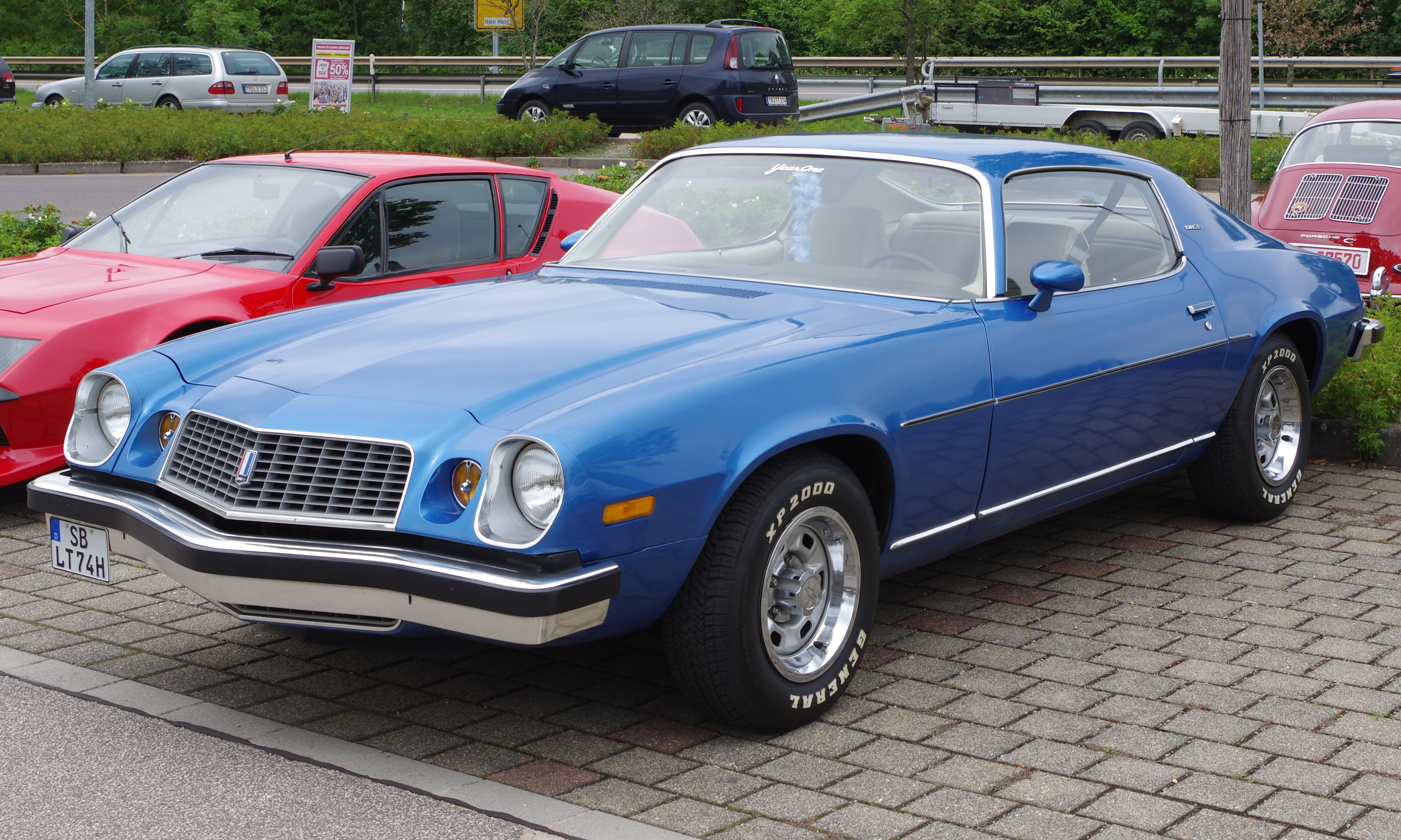
1974 Chevrolet Camaro

The 1974 Camaro grew seven inches (180 mm) longer, thanks to new bumpers required to meet federal standards and a forward-sloping grille. Round taillights were replaced with a rectangular wraparound design. It was the last year to have a flat rear window, with thick roof pillars. All later years had slimmer roof pillars and a wraparound rear window for better visibility. This was the last year of the RPO Z28, which shared the same drive train and engine as in the previous year (1973), based on the Corvette L82 special high-performance engine; the Z28 would re-emerge in 1977 as its own model and no longer an RPO.

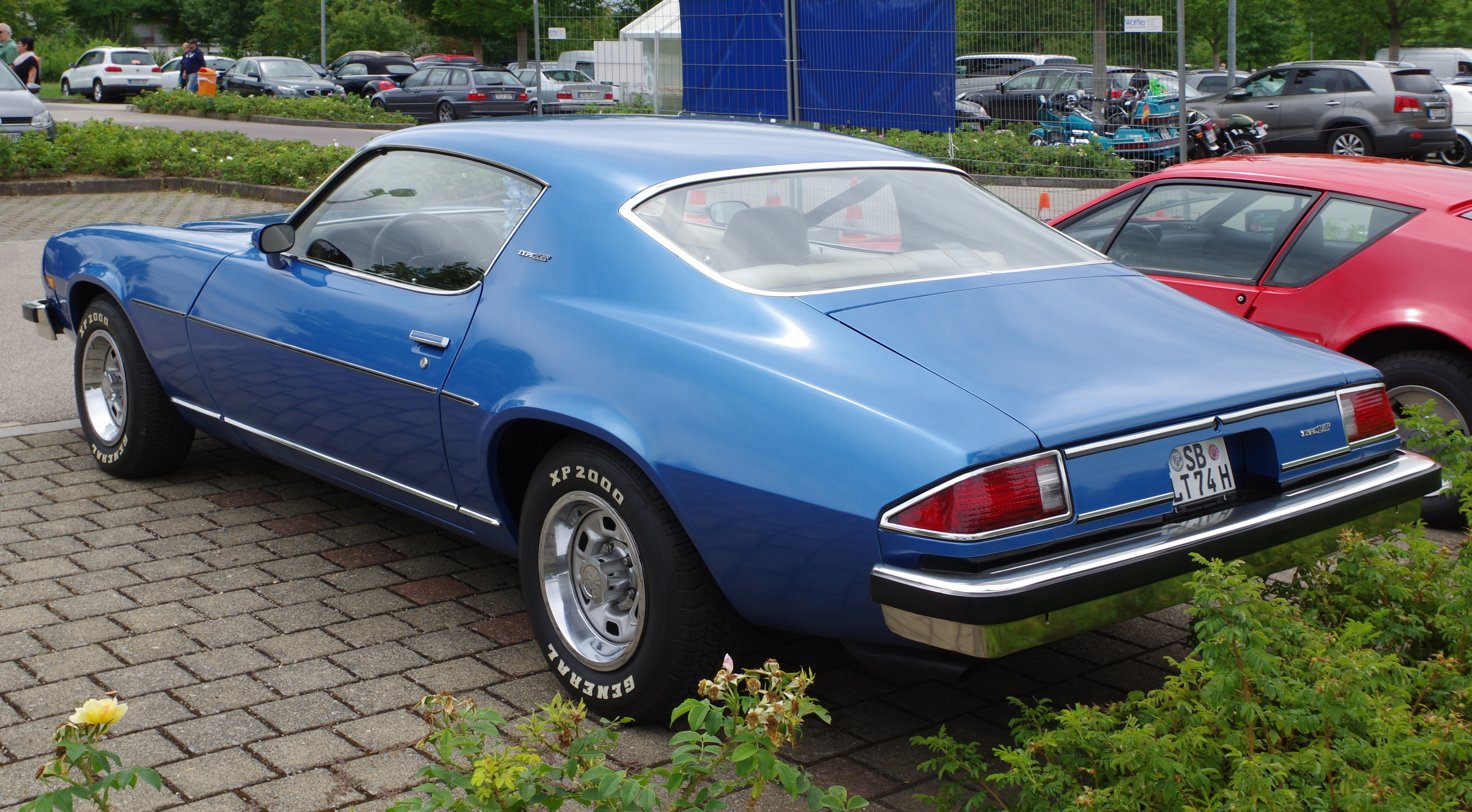
1974 Chevrolet Camaro rear

Camaro sales increased to over 150,000 units, of which 13,802 were Z28s (the highest 2nd-generation Z28 production to this time) despite the energy crisis fueled by the Arab Oil Embargo. Two ponycar competitors were repositioned in the marketplace this year. Ford downsized the Mustang to an all new 1974 Ford Mustang II subcompact based on the Pinto that was designed for an era of high gas prices and fuel shortages resulting in 385,993 units produced for the model year. Mercury upsized the Cougar to an intermediate-sized personal luxury car to compete with the Chevrolet Monte Carlo and Pontiac Grand Prix. Other changes included Chrysler Corporation discontinuing the Plymouth Barracuda and Dodge Challenger during the course of the 1974 model year. Likewise, 1974 was the final year of the AMC Javelin, but a sporty AMX model would be reintroduced in 1978.

==== 1975 ====
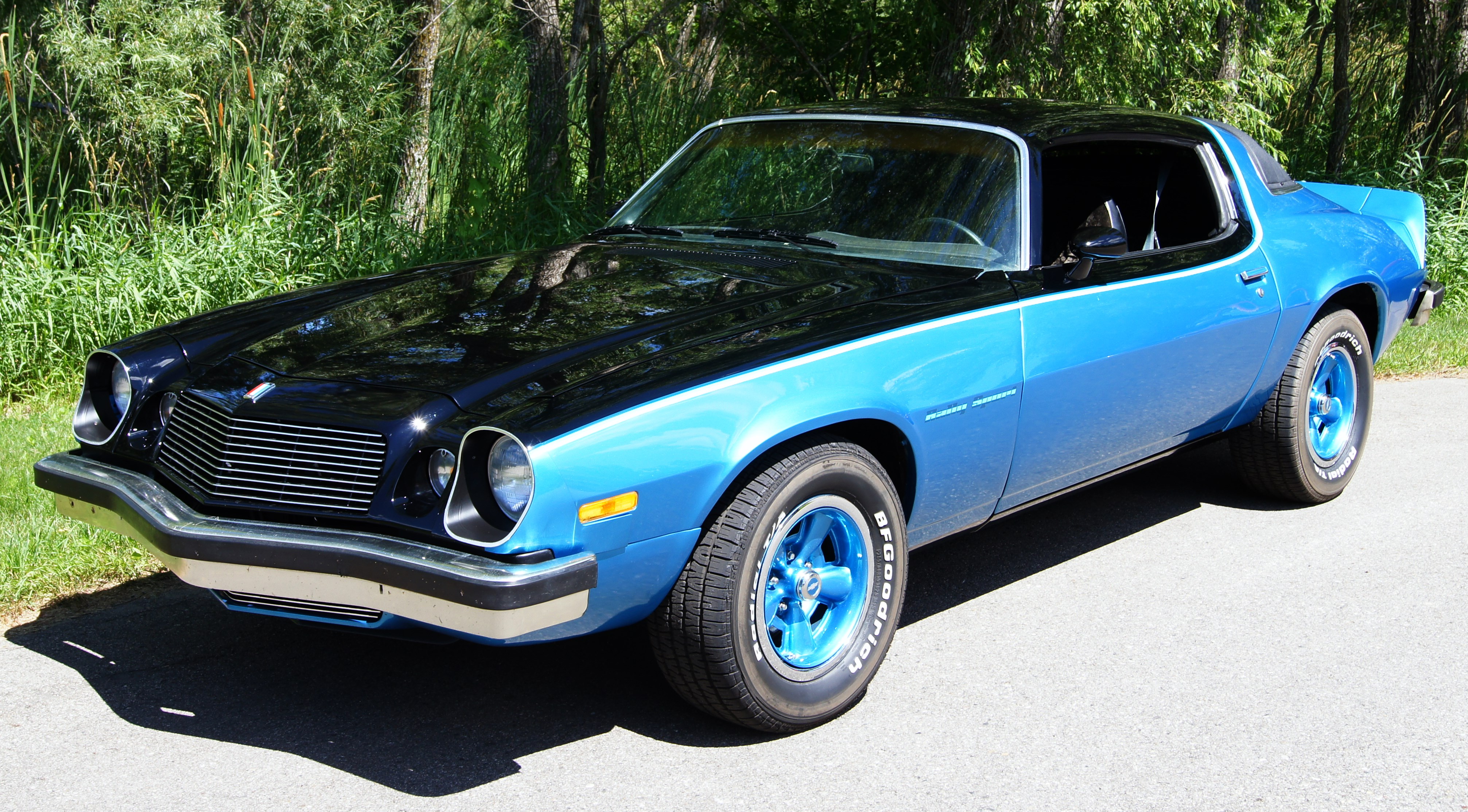
1975 Chevrolet Camaro RS

For 1975, a catalytic converter was added to the exhaust system of all US-market GM passenger cars, including the Camaro. The "Air Injection Reactor" secondary air injection system was still present. The catalytic emission control system was more efficient at reducing emissions than the previous non-catalytic system, and allowed engines to be retuned for improved drivability and fuel economy. The catalytic converter and GM High Energy electronic ignition were advertised among the components of "Chevrolet's new Efficiency System" which was promoted to offer other benefits to owners of 1975 models versus comparable 1974 models that included extended maintenance intervals from 6,000 to 7,500 mi (12,070 km) for oil/filter changes and spark plugs that lasted up to 22,500 mi (36,210 km) compared to 10,000 mi (16,093 km) on 1974 models.

The Z28 option was discontinued for 1975 despite an increase in sales to over 13,000 units in 1974. Optional engines continued to reflect the impact of emissions. Two 350 cid (5.7 L) V8s produced 145 hp (108 kW; 147 PS) and 155 hp (116 kW) (Horsepower losses can seem a bit exaggerated compared to earlier cars, however, their power ratings were now net as opposed to the prior gross ratings. SAE net power ratings (used since 1972) were taken from the engine crankshaft as before, but now all accessories had to be attached and operating, and all emissions equipment and a full production exhaust system had to be in place. These power-robbing additions — along with stringent new emissions laws and the equipment they required — were instrumental in creating the vastly smaller power figures found in subsequent cars. The manufacturers themselves also sometimes intentionally underrated engines for a variety of motives, notably avoiding provoking the insurance companies and federal regulators into enacting undesirable policies, but also sometimes to prevent lower priced models from stacking up too well on paper against their own more profitable high-end products.

A new wraparound rear window was introduced for 1975 and the Camaro emblem moved from the center of the grille to above the grillework and the "Camaro" nameplate was deleted from the rear decklid. Also new block letter "Camaro" nameplates replaced the previous scripts on the front fenders. Interiors were revised slightly with new seat trim patterns and bird's-eye maple trim replacing the Meridian grained walnut on the instrument panel of LT models. Announced for this year was the availability of a leather interior option in the Camaro LT, but never saw the light of day as no production cars were equipped with real hide seats. Other developments included the availability of air conditioning with six-cylinder engines and standard radial tires on all models. Power door locks were a new option for 1975. The Rally Sport option returned after a one-year absence, but amounted to little more than an appearance package.

Despite the loss of the Z28, Camaro sales remained steady for 1975 at 145,770 units. With the demise of the other pony cars the previous year, Camaro and Pontiac's Firebird were now the only traditional pony cars left on the market, giving GM 100 percent penetration of this segment for the first time ever. Also, despite General Motors' policy against factory-sponsored racing efforts, Camaro began to make a name for itself on the track on the new International Race of Champions (IROC) series with many top drivers winning trophies from behind the wheel of a Camaro year after year until the late 1980s.

==== 1976 ====
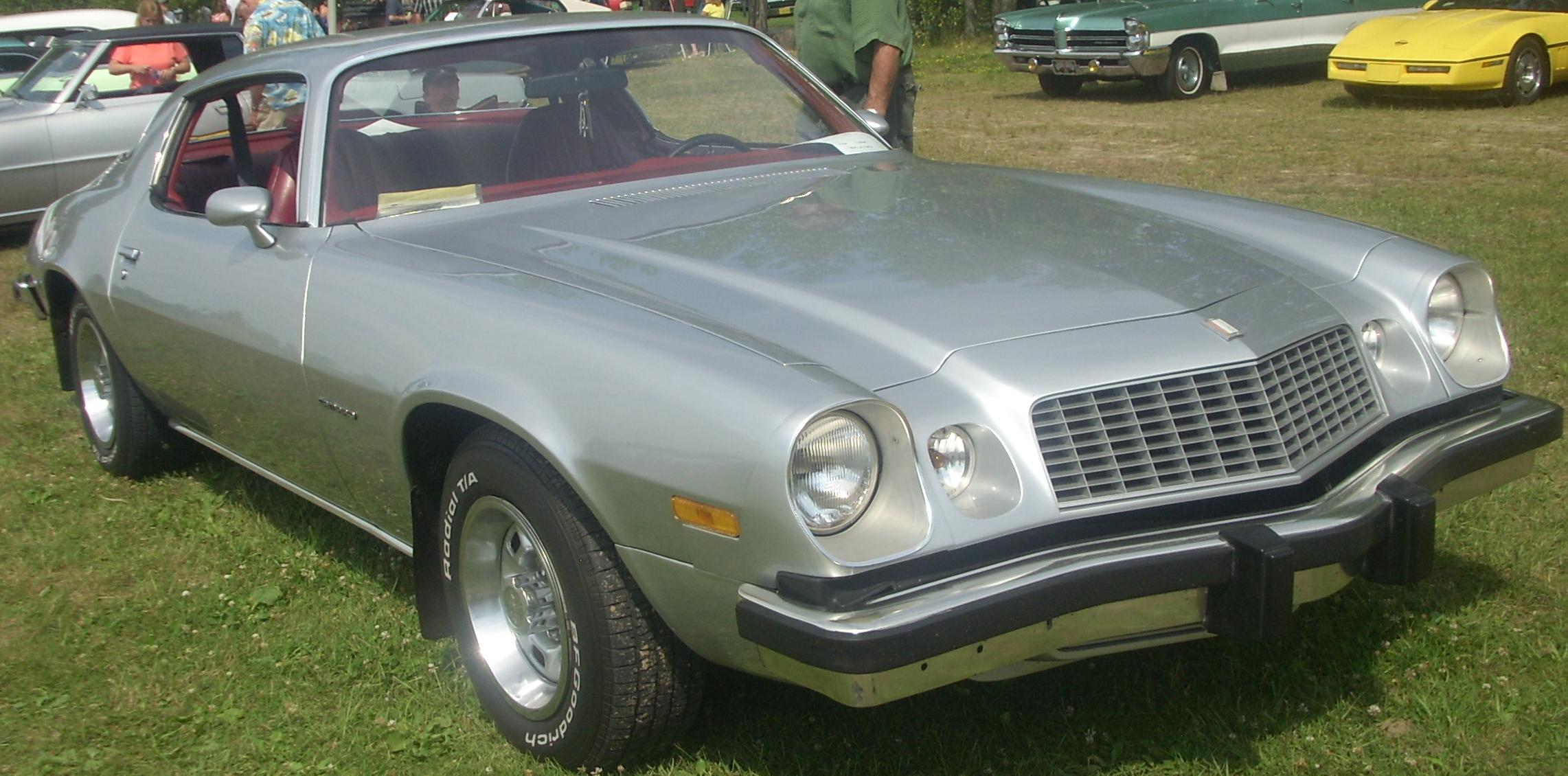
1976 Chevrolet Camaro

Only minor appearance changes highlighted the 1976 Camaro, most notably a brushed metal insert in the rear tail section on the LT model. The 250 cubic-inch six-cylinder remained the standard engine in the sport coupe and a new 140 hp (104 kW; 142 PS) 305 cubic-inch V8 became the standard engine in the LT and base V8 option in the sport coupe. The larger 350 cubic-inch V8 was now only available with a four-barrel carburetor and 165 hp (123 kW; 167 PS). Power brakes became standard on V8 models this year. The Camaro's popularity was soaring. Sales totals jumped significantly for 1976, the best year yet for the second generation, and were to improve even more dramatically as the decade progressed.

==== 1977 ====
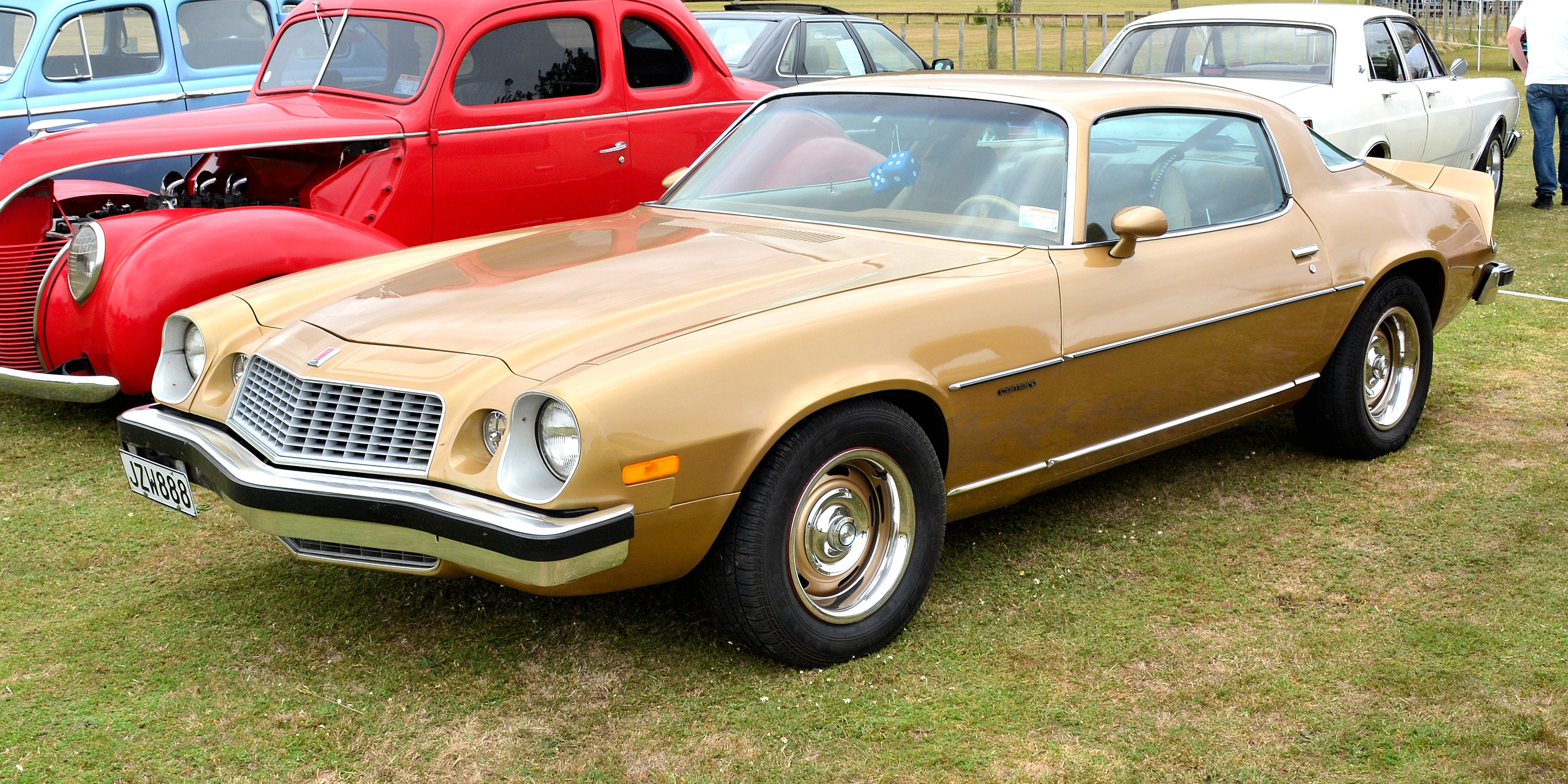
1977 Chevrolet Camaro

Intermittent wipers were offered as a new option in 1977, and the 250 cu in (4.1 L) I-6 became the standard engine for both the sport coupe and luxury LT models. The 145 hp (108 kW; 147 PS) 305 cu in (5.0 L) continued as the base V8 and the four-barrel 350 cu in (5.7 L) that was optional on sport coupe and LT models was uprated to 170 hp (127 kW; 172 PS). Due to General Motors' engine sharing program, the 350 CID Chevrolet engine was also used by Oldsmobile. This year the optional "Bumperettes" were offered for the LT models (front bumper only) and were mandatory for all Camaro models sold in the state of California.

In response to increasing sales of Pontiac's Trans Am, which sold over 46,000 units in 1976 and accounted for half of all Firebird sales, the Z28 was reintroduced as its own model in the spring of 1977 (as a 1977½). The revived Z28 was powered by a 350 cu in (5.7 L) LM1 V8 with four-barrel carburetor producing 185 hp (138 kW; 188 PS) (175 hp (130 kW; 177 PS) with California emissions equipment). The engine was not the same "350" that had been part of the RPO Z28 Special Performance Package, the engine that had been shared with the Corvette LT-1 and L82 top-performance 350 engines from 1970 to 1974. Gone were the 4-bolt main bearing engine block, forged crank, forged pistons, big valve heads, and performance camshaft. Still, the LM1 was the most powerful Camaro engine and only available in the Z28 model. The engine came with better tuned intake and exhaust, shared with most Chevy passenger cars. Most Z28s were sold with air conditioning and an automatic transmission, rather than the Borg-Warner Super T-10 4-speed manual transmission.

Output set a record for the second-generation Camaro, with 218,853 coupes produced. The Camaro outsold Ford's Mustang for the first time ever. For 1977 Z28 production was around 13,000 cars with a 195 hp (145 kW; 198 PS) 350 engine.

==== 1978 ====
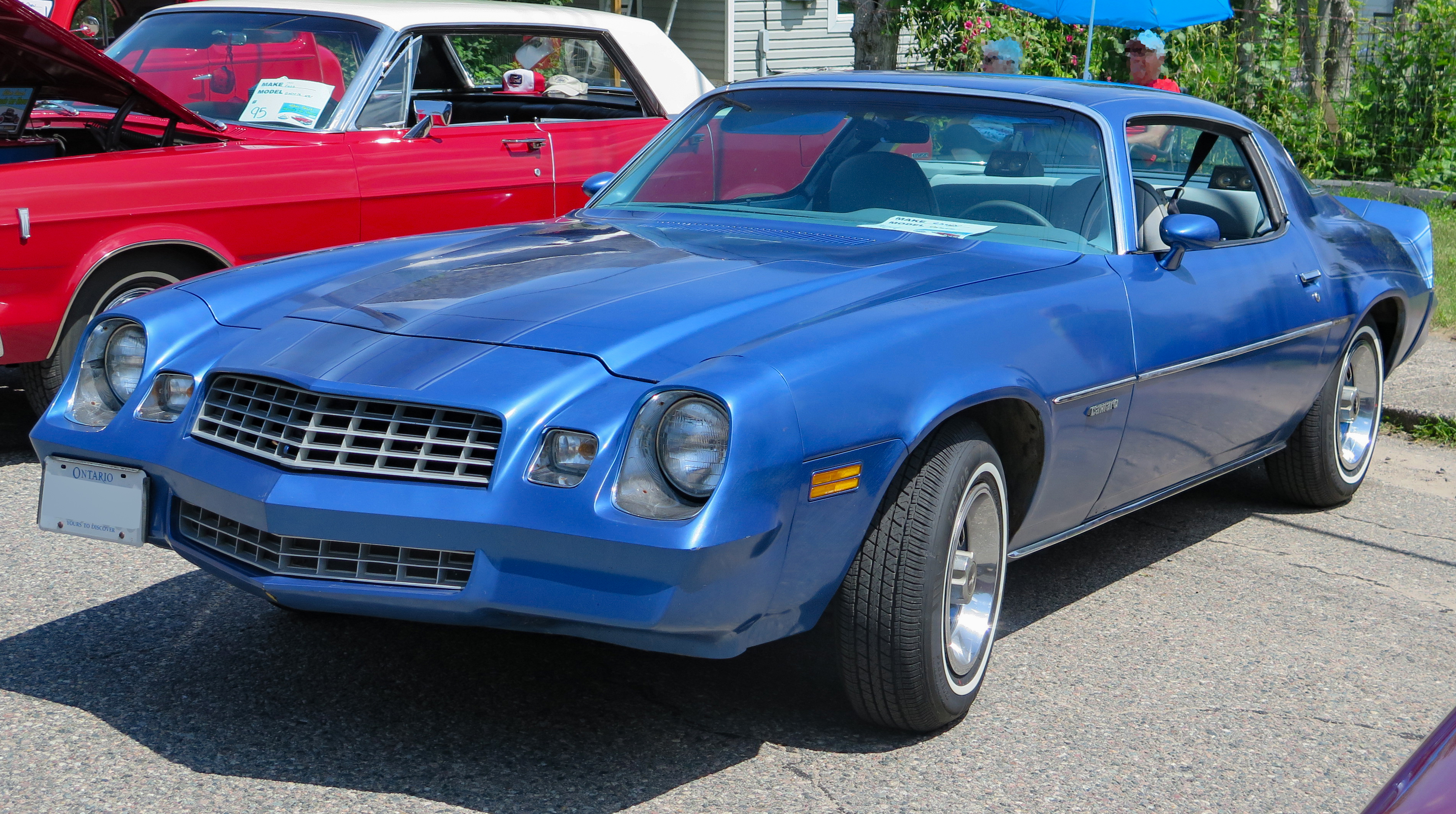
1978 Chevrolet Camaro

The 1978 Camaro featured a new body colored urethane front and rear bumpers, and amber taillight turn signals. Available models included the base Sport Coupe, Type LT, Z28, and the return of the Rally Sport. The Rally Sport (not badged RS as in previous years) featured a standard two-tone paint treatment. A T-Top roof configuration was offered as an option, introduced on the 1976 Pontiac Trans Am 50th Anniversary Limited Edition, and a regular production option on the 1977 Firebird.

The Z28 models included a stripe package that was not deletable and featured the LM1 a 350 cu in (5.7 L) V8 with a four-barrel Quadrajet carburetor that produced 185 hp (138 kW; 188 PS) and 280 lb⋅ft (380 N⋅m) of torque, coupled to either a 4-speed manual or a TH-350 3-speed automatic. A non-functioning hood scoop was outlined with a decal around the intake.

Camaro sales topped all previous years with 272,631 units, of which 54,907 were the Z28 model.

==== 1979 ====
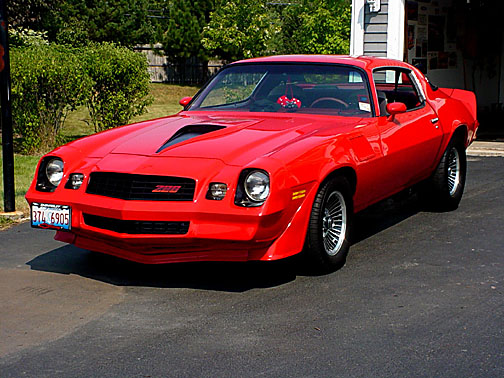
1979 Chevrolet Camaro Z28

There were few changes to the 1979 Camaro. Engine choices remained with the 250 I6 standard in the base and RS models, with the 305 2bbl being an option and standard on the newly introduced luxury-oriented Berlinetta model. It replaced the Type LT, and had a restyled instrument panel with a much flatter appearance than the previous wraparound design (although the gauges themselves remained in the same places as before). The base models, RS and Z28 remained, the Z28s came with a front spoiler and fender flares much like the Pontiac Trans Am already had, and came with "Z28" decals that ran from the beginning of the front flares to the bottoms of the doors.

An electric rear window defroster became an option, replacing the old blower type.

Sales for 1979 were 282,571 units, the highest ever for any generation Camaro before or since.

==== 1980 ====
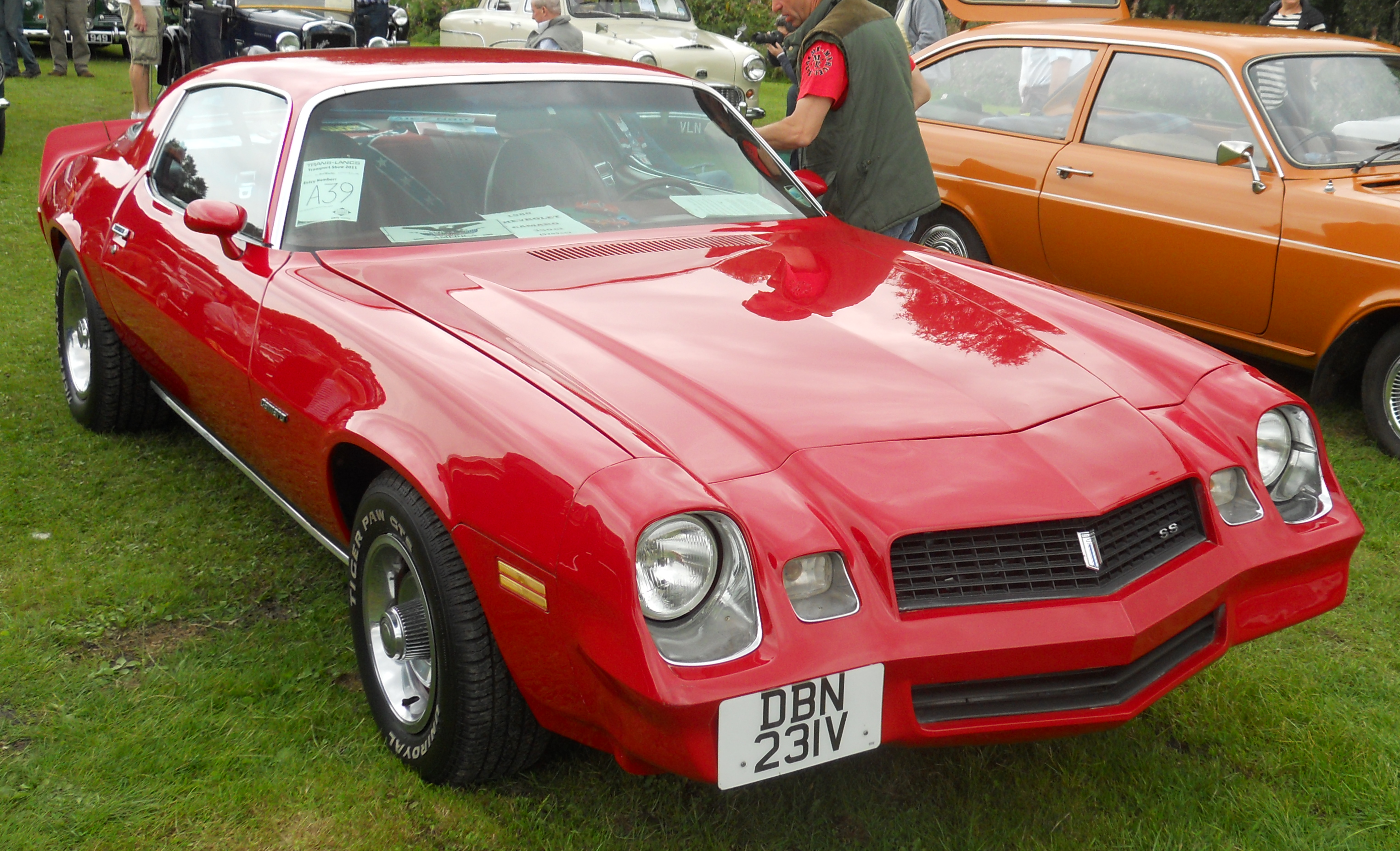
1980 Chevrolet Camaro

For 1980, the aged 250 cu in (4.1 L) inline-six was replaced with a 229 cu in (3.8 L) V6 engine, 231 cu in (3.8 L) in California, a first for the Camaro. The 120 hp (89 kW; 122 PS) (4.4 L) 267 cu in V8 engine became an option on the base, RS and Berlinetta models. The 350 cu in (5.7 L) V8 was only available on the Z28.

The Z28 hood included a rear-pointing raised scoop with a solenoid operated flap which opened at full throttle, allowing the engine to breathe cooler air. A federally mandated 85 mph (137 km/h) speedometer also debuted, down from 130. Z28s had new optional grey 5-spoke rims, a unique upper and lower front grille, and smaller revised graphics on its doors. The side scoops were also changed from a louvered design to a flatter one with a single opening.

==== 1981 ====
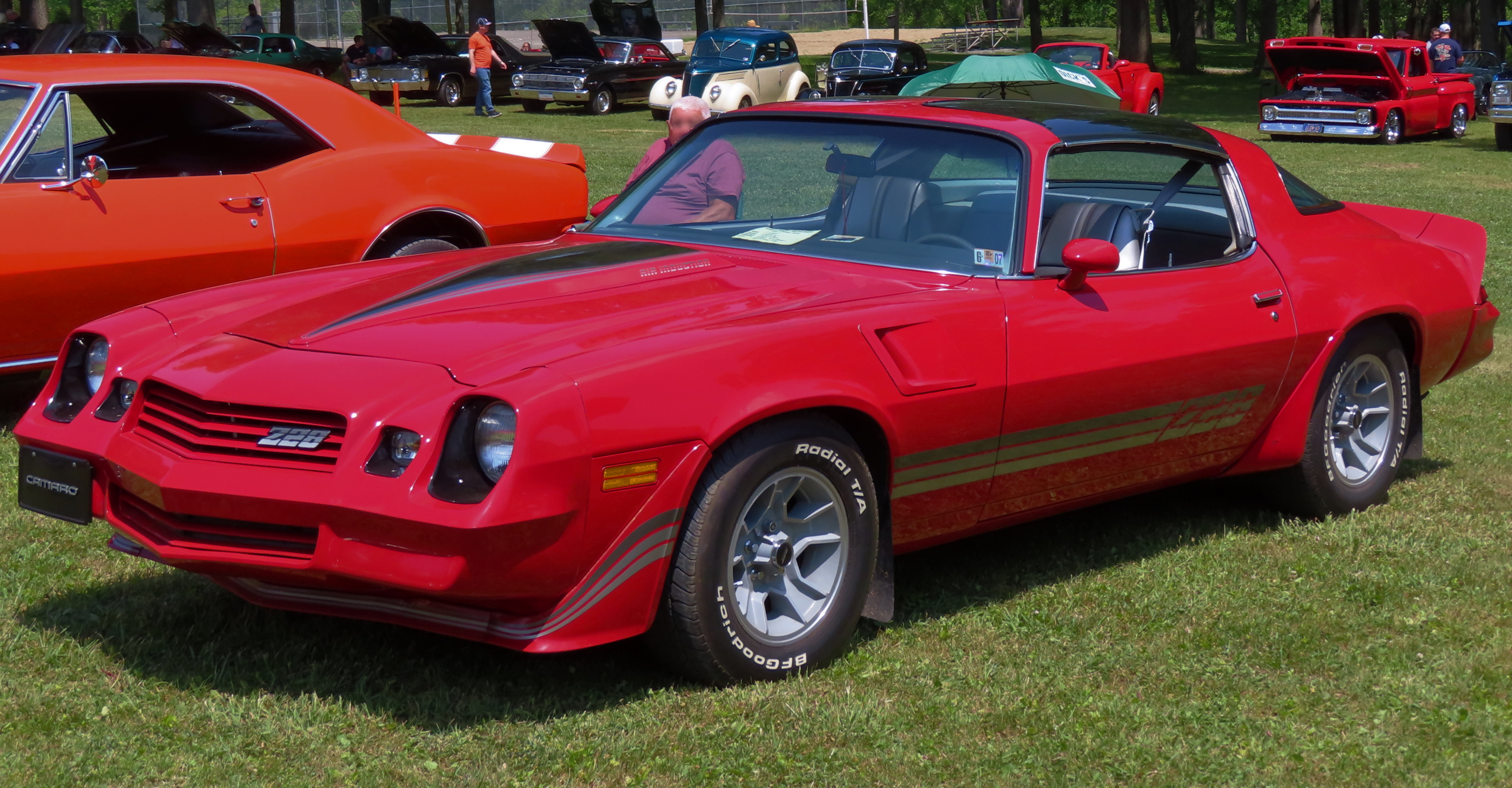
1981 Chevrolet Camaro Z28

The 1981 model was nearly unchanged from 1980, and would be the last model year for the second-generation Camaro. The RS option was dropped (but would reappear in 1989).

Due to emissions restrictions, U.S. Z28s came with two different engines: the majority received the 350 cu in (5.7 L) V8, available only with automatic transmission (except California, where it was banned entirely). It was equipped with a CCC (Computer Command Control), a first-generation engine control module (ECM), which had an oxygen sensor, an electronically controlled carburetor, a throttle position sensor, coolant sensors, a barometric pressure sensor, a Manifold Absolute Pressure sensor (MAP), and a check engine light on the dash; it could also be used as a self-diagnostic tool. The transmission gained a lockup torque converter, also controlled by the CCC. However, as the primary goal of computer control was emissions reduction, any performance gains in one area were lost in another, and horsepower dropped to 175 hp (130 kW; 177 PS). California buyers, and those elsewhere desiring a four-speed manual transmission, had to settle for the 165 hp (123 kW; 167 PS) 305 cu in (5.0 L) V8.

The 350 V8/4-speed combination was available in Canada, without the new CCC, with the same specs as 1980.

Influenced partly by rising gas prices, production dropped to 126,139 units.
