= Ford Mustang (second generation) =

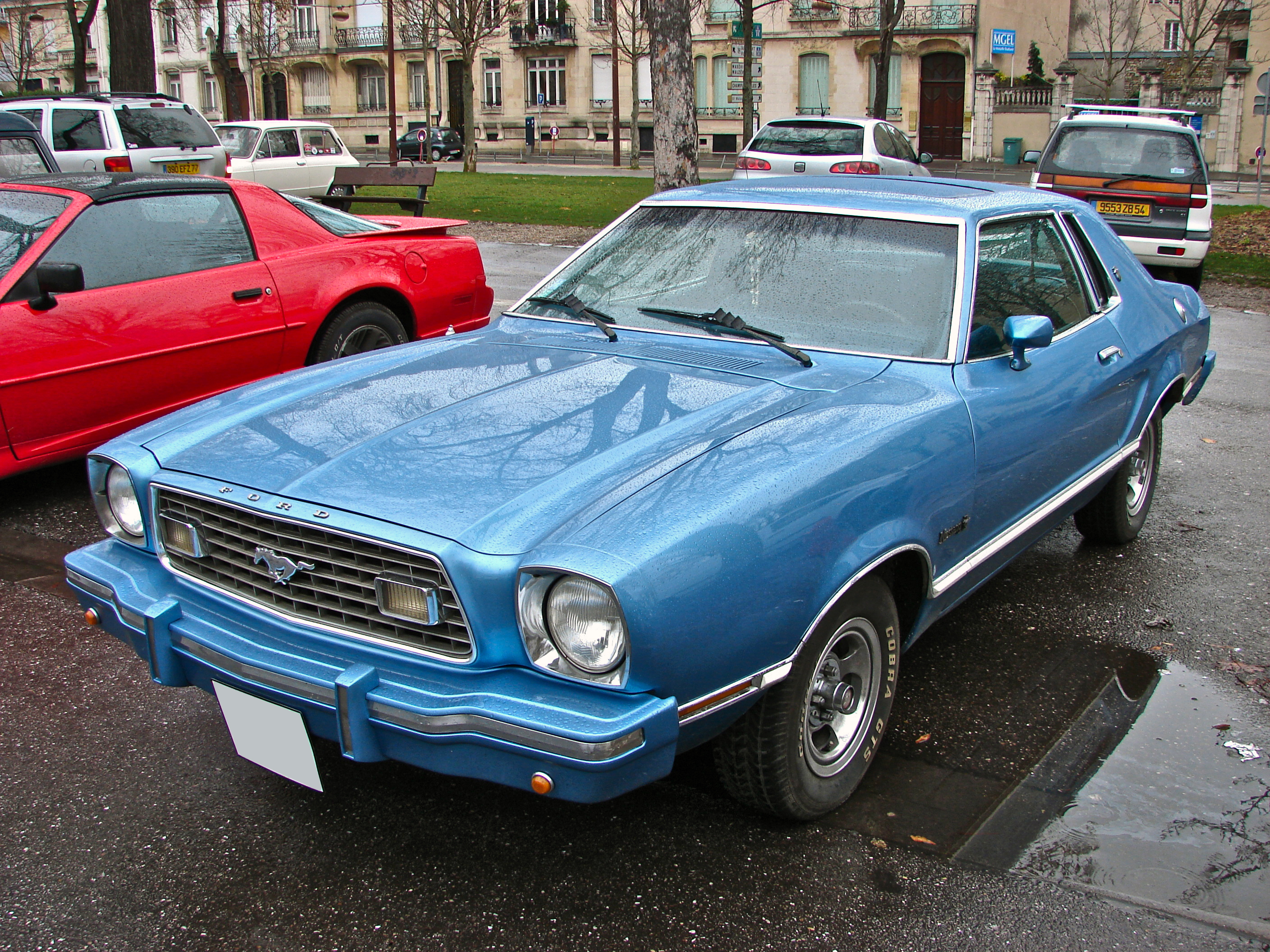
- Ford Mustang II Ghia coupe

Overview
- Manufacturer: Ford
- Also called: Ford Mustang II; Ford T5 (Germany)
- Production: 1973–1978
- Model years: 1974–1978
- Assembly: United States: Dearborn, Michigan (Ford River Rouge Complex); Milpitas, California (San Jose Assembly Plant); Edison, New Jersey (Edison Assembly); Mexico: Mexico City (La Villa Assembly)
- Designer: Buck Mook, Dick Nesbitt

Body and chassis
- Class: Pony car Subcompact car
- Body style: 2-door coupe; 3-door hatchback
- Layout: Front-engine, rear-wheel-drive
- Related: Ford Pinto; Mercury Bobcat

Powertrain
- Engine: 140 cu in (2.3 L) Lima I4; 171 cu in (2.8 L) Cologne V6; 302 cu in (4.9 L) Windsor V8
- Transmission: 4-speed manual; 3-speed C3 automatic; 3-speed C4 automatic (302 V8)

Dimensions
- Wheelbase: 96.2 in (2,443 mm)
- Length: 175.0 in (4,445 mm)
- Width: 70.2 in (1,783 mm)
- Height: 2-door: 50.3 in (1,278 mm); 3-door: 50.0 in (1,270 mm)

Chronology
- Predecessor: Ford Mustang (first generation)
- Successor: Ford Mustang (third generation)

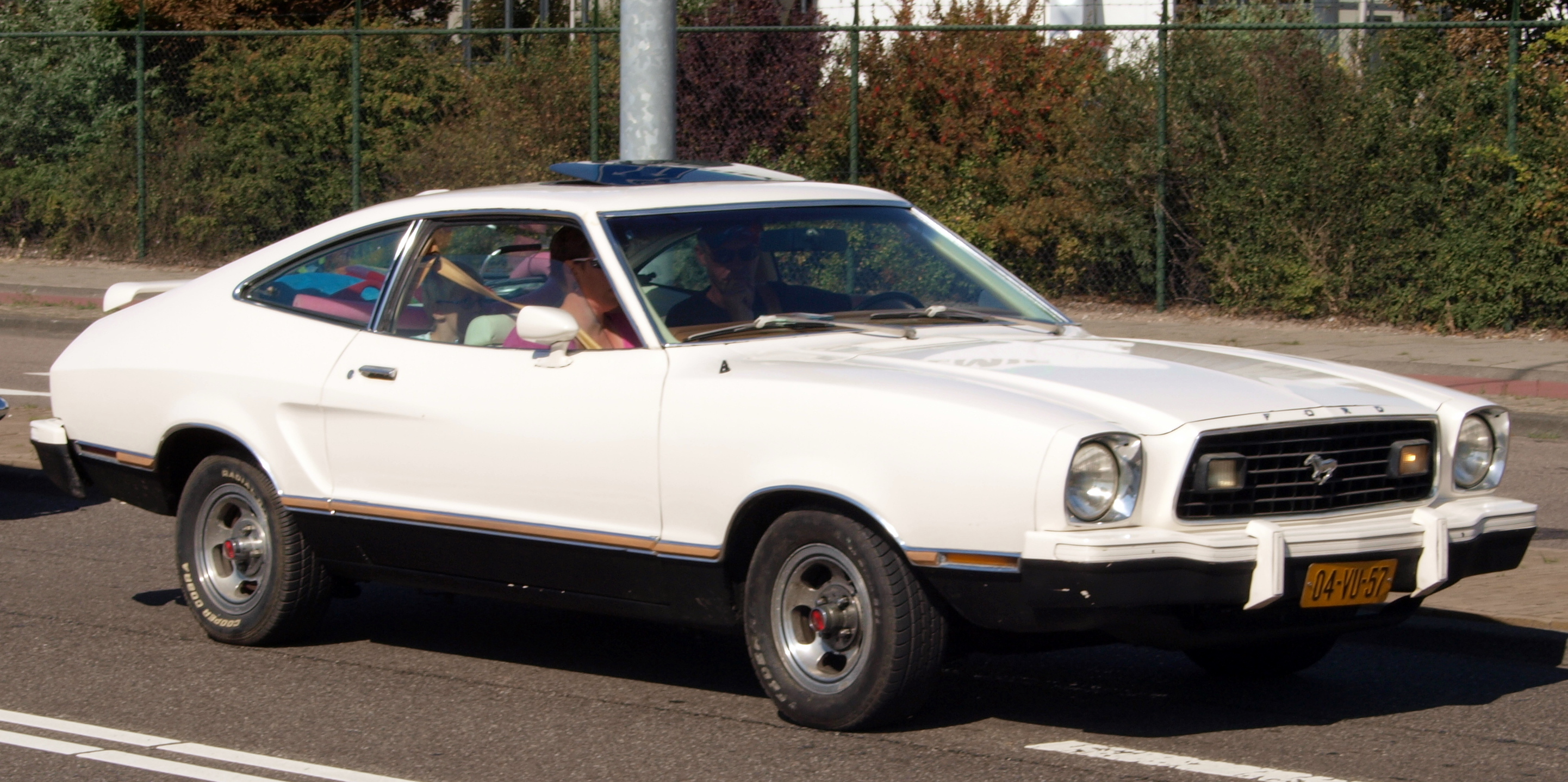
Ford Mustang II 2+2 hatchback

The second-generation Ford Mustang, marketed as the Ford Mustang II, is a pony car which was manufactured and marketed by Ford from 1973 until 1978, featuring a front-engine, rear-wheel-drive layout with four passenger seating in two-door coupé and three-door hatchback body styles.

Introduced in September 1973 for the 1974 model year, the Mustang II arrived roughly at the same time as the oil embargo of 1973 and subsequent fuel shortages. Developed under Lee Iacocca, it was an "entirely new kind of pony car." Ford "decided to call it Mustang II, since it was a new type of pony car designed for an era of high gas prices and fuel shortages."

The Mustang II was 490 lb (222 kg) lighter and almost 19 in (483 mm) shorter than the 1973 Mustang, and derived from the subcompact Pinto platform. While sharing a limited number of driveline components with the Pinto, the Mustang II employed an exclusive subframe, isolating its front suspension and engine mount subframe. The steering used a rack-and-pinion design.

Named Motor Trend's 1974 Car of the Year and reaching over 1.1 million sales over four years of production. The Mustang II is noted for its effective marketing and high sales, as well as its featuring some of the most criticized aspects of the automotive malaise era.

== Background ==
The first-generation Mustangs grew in size; the 1973 model had become markedly larger than the original model. The pony car market segment saw decreasing sales in the early-1970s "with many buyers turning to lower-priced, fuel-efficient compacts like Ford's own Ford Maverick – a huge first-year success itself." The Mustang was growing to become an intermediate-sized sedan, which "was too big and alienated many in its customer base." The allure of the original Mustang was its trim size and concept. The automakers in Detroit had "begun to receive vibrations from the only source it really listens to — new-car buyers… The message: Build smaller cars" as customers stopped buying and the inventory of unsold new cars climbed during the summer of 1973, and there were already positive market expectations for the new downsized Mustang. Automakers were "scrambling" by December 1973 as "the trend toward smaller, less extravagant cars to surge ahead faster than anyone had expected."

After becoming president of Ford Motor Company on December 10, 1970, Lee Iacocca ordered the development of a smaller Mustang for 1974 introduction. Initial plans called for a downsized Mustang based on the compact Ford Maverick, similar in size and power to the Falcon, the basis for the original Mustang. Those plans were subsequently scrapped in favor of a smaller Mustang based on the subcompact Ford Pinto, which had been introduced in 1971.

Rather than competing against GM's larger pony cars, Chevrolet Camaro and Pontiac Firebird, the Mustang II now competed against sporty subcompact models, including GM's Buick Skyhawk, Oldsmobile Starfire, Pontiac Sunbird, and Chevrolet Monza. The new model competed also with 2+2 import coupes such as the Toyota Celica, Datsun 240Z, Mazda RX-3, and the European Ford Capri – which itself was inspired by the original Mustang but built by Ford of Europe, and marketed since April 1970 in the U.S. by Mercury as a captive import. It saw a new competitor from Germany in 1974 with the Volkswagen Scirocco, and the BMW 2002 introduced earlier in the late 1960s.

The new design featured rack and pinion steering and a separate engine sub-frame to decrease noise, vibration, and harshness.

According to Ford's Chief Engineer Stuart M. Frey (younger brother of Donald N. Frey), Iacocca expected a high level of fit and finish, wanting the car to be "a little jewel". Mustang II production reached 385,993 the first year. Where its predecessor's production, the 1973 Mustang, had reached 134,867, the 1974 model reached within "10 percent of the original Mustang's 12-month production record of 418,812." Over five years the Mustang II recorded four of the ten top model year Mustang sales. A 2009 report confirmed Iacocca's vision for the 1974–1978 Mustang II, saying it "was the right car at the right time, selling more than 1 million units in four years."

The introduction of the Mustang II on September 21, 1973, coincided with the Arab oil embargo. The marketplace was adjusting to the fuel crisis, increasing insurance rates, United States emission standards, safety regulations, and downturns in the economy, as well as the waning consumer demand in the pony car segment. GM had considered discontinuing the Camaro and Firebird after 1972, and in 1974 Chrysler discontinued the Barracuda and Dodge Challenger, American Motors discontinued the Javelin, and lighter, more economical imported cars became increasingly popular – "in effect, filling the segment the Mustang had created, then abandoned." Ultimately, the Mustang II would be an early example of downsizing that would take place among Detroit's Big Three later in the decade. Conversely, the Mustang's former corporate twin the Mercury Cougar was upsized to the intermediate Ford Torino platform to better compete in the growing mid-size personal luxury car segment.

A Mercury version of the Mustang II badged as a Capri (as evinced by a proposal using the Mustang II's 2+2 body with a rounded rear quarter window style and characteristic bodyside sculpting) was briefly considered, but the strong sales of the Ford Capri (Mk1) as a captive import through Lincoln-Mercury dealerships shelved plans for a corporate twin. Lincoln-Mercury continued to import the Capri in the updated MkII version until 1978. The Mercury Capri for 1979 became Mustang's American-built corporate twin, sharing the new Fox platform.

== Design ==
Based on the Ford Pinto, the initial Mustang II production design was done by young Ford designer Howard "Buck" Mook and was personally selected by Iacocca The new model, however, was "less of a Pinto than the '64½ had been a Falcon." Two body styles were available; a two-door notchback coupe and a sportier three-door "2+2" hatchback (also referred to as a "liftback"). A folding rear seat was optional on the notchback coupe and was standard on all hatchback models. "2+2" also accurately described the rear seat capacity according to period commentators. Weight distribution was front-heavy, with a 1974 V6-equipped car having 58 percent of its weight over the front wheels. The Mustang II was also the first American car to have power-assisted rack and pinion steering.

== Chassis ==
The Mustang II uses a Hotchkiss-type rear suspension consisting of a live hypoid rear axle supported and located by semi-elliptic multi-leaf springs, two telescoping hydraulic shock absorbers, and, on most models, a rear anti-sway bar.

Suspension

- Front : Compression strut with lower trailing links, stabilizer bar and coil springs
- Rear : Hotchkiss rigid axle with semi-elliptic leaf springs and anti-sway bars

Steering

- Rack and Pinion

Brakes

- Front Brake Size : 9.3 in | 236 mm.
- Rear Brake Size : 9.0 in | 229 mm.

Tires / Wheels

- Tires : B78 x 13
- Wheels : 13 x 5

Optional Tires

- Tires : BR70 x 13 RWL SBR (Mach 1)
- Tires : CR70 x 13
- Tires : 195/70R13

== Model year changes ==
=== 1974 ===
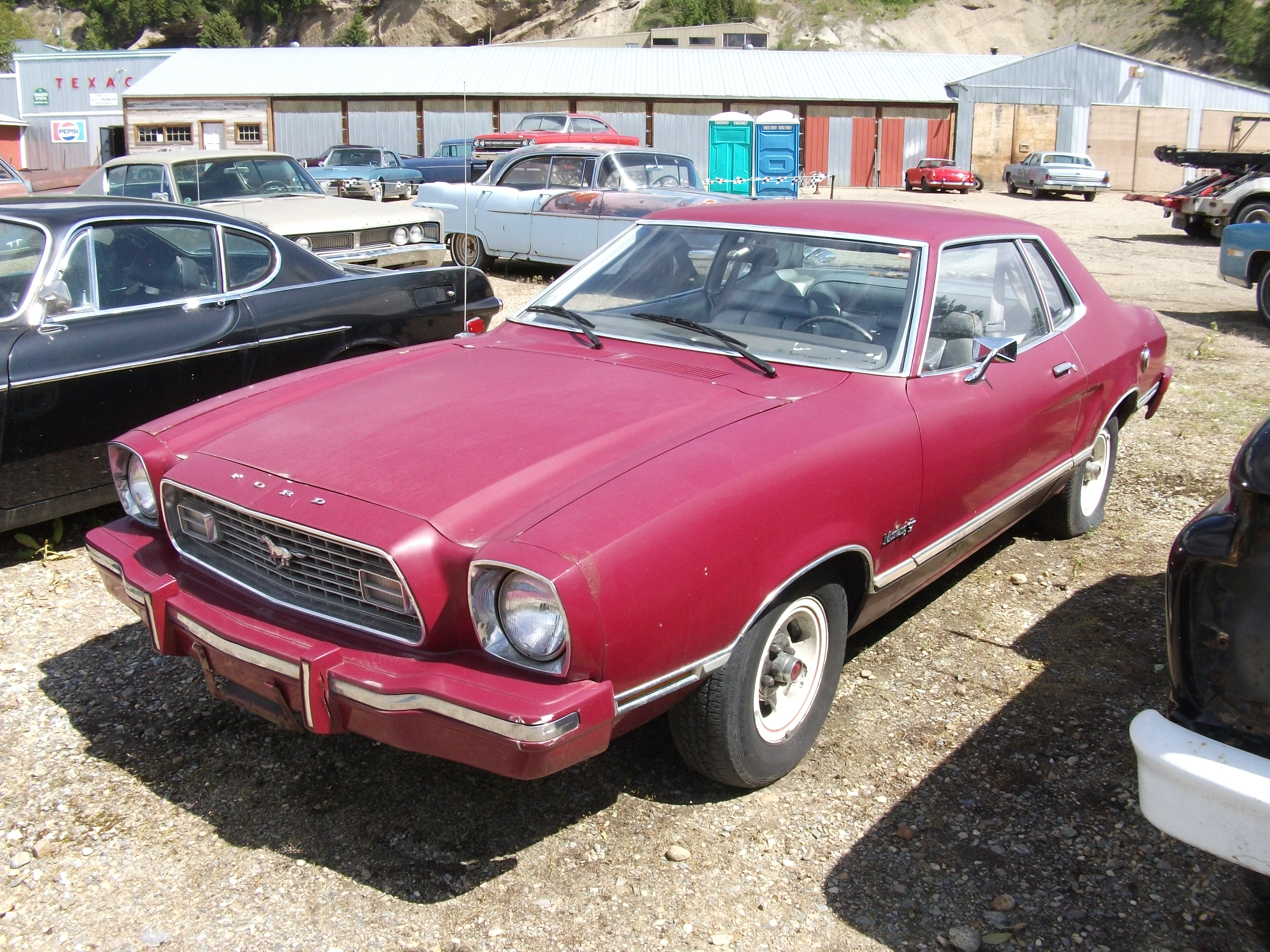
1974 Mustang II hardtop coupe

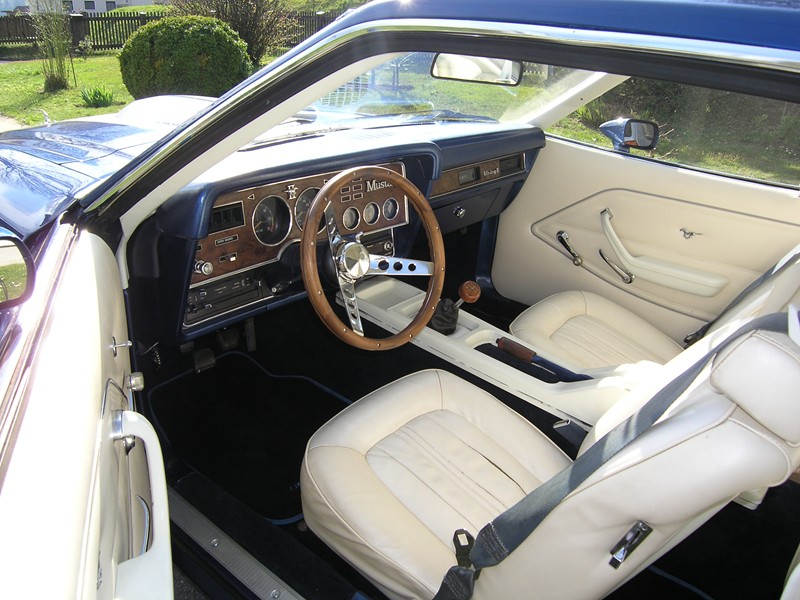
1974 Mustang II interior

Designers and engineers worked feverishly on a "reinvented" Mustang, mimicking the first version, by the traditional new model year introduction during the fall of 1973. The new Mustang II returned to a size closer to the 1965 model, ultimately winning the Motor Trend Car of the Year. The economical Mustang II became popular for consumers almost concurrently with their experience with gasoline rationing that was part of the 1973 oil crisis.

"Just as the original Mustang had been based on mundane Falcon components, Iacocca and company decided to use some of the parts from the new-for-1971 subcompact Ford Pinto as the basis for the Mustang." The new Mustang was viewed as a "fun-to-drive economy" car, but "in reality, it shared its underpinnings with the ... Pinto." The Mustang II carried handling and engineering improvements; its performance was comparable to contemporary Detroit products, yet Consumer Guide ranked it very low in handling, "near the bottom of the low-price sporty compact class".

Competitors also included the Toyota Celica and the Datsun 240Z. Sales of such imports attracted fewer than 100,000 customers in 1965, but by 1972 demand had increased; therefore, the "Mustang II's mission was to capture a big slice of this sizable new pie."

Available as a coupe or three-door hatchback, the new car's base engine was a 140 cu in (2.3 L) SOHC I4, the first fully metric-dimensioned engine built in the U.S. A 171 cu in (2.8 L) V6 was the sole optional engine. Mustang II packages ranged from the base "Hardtop," 2+2 hatchback, a "Ghia" luxury group with vinyl roof, and a top-of-the-line V6-powered Mach 1. A V8 engine option would not be available in a Mustang for the only time for the 1974 model year (except in Mexico).

"The Mustang II's attractive all-new styling was influenced by coachbuilder Ghia of Italy, which had recently been acquired by Ford. It carried through the long-hood, short-deck theme of the original, and — as Iacocca requested it — came as a notchback and hatch-equipped fastback." Mustangs lost their pillarless body style; all models now had fixed rear windows and a chrome-covered "B" pillar that resembled a hardtop, but was a coupe. In Mustang advertisements, however, Ford promoted the notchback coupe as a "Hardtop". Unsure about whether or not to group the Mustang II with sporty cars, Consumer Guide initially referred to the car as a "luxury subcompact", while Ford brochures suggested that the luxury-trim Ghia model, with its formal roofline, stylish exterior, and plush interior, be thought of as resembling the popular personal luxury category of the time.

Almost replicating the initial 1965 Mustang's sales rush, "even without any real performance appeal, the 1974 Mustang II brought buyers running into Ford dealerships." Sales for the Mustang II increased in 1974, making it the 6th best selling Mustang of all time with 296,041 units produced.

=== 1975 ===
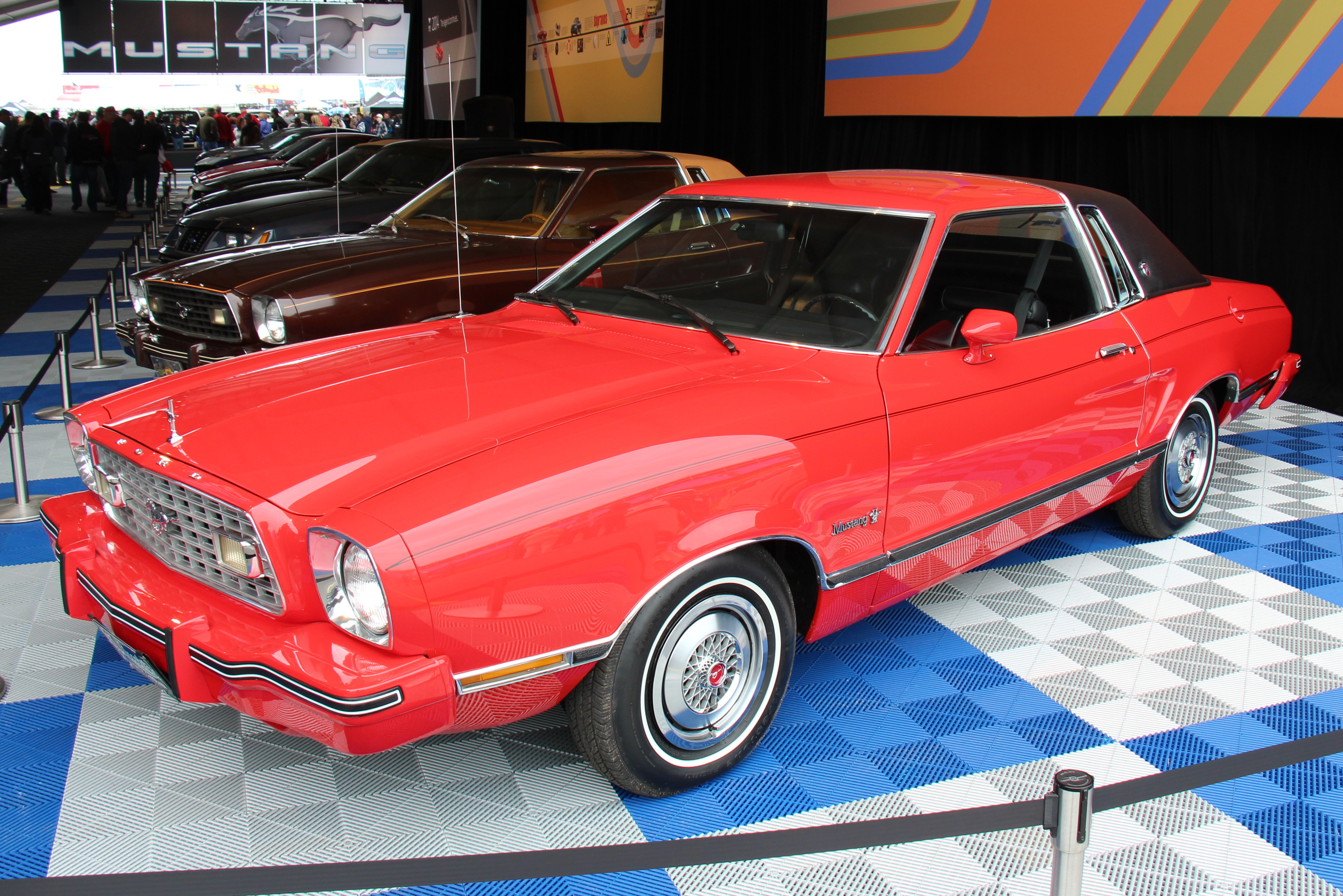
1975–1978 Mustang II Ghia

"With oil crisis memories starting to fade," Ford needed a V8 in the Mustang II to return "performance to respectable levels." The engine bay was re-engineered to accept the 302 cu in (4.9 L) V8 option for the 1975 model year, with revised hood and header panel. The engine was limited to a two-barrel carburetor and "net" 140 hp (104 kW; 142 PS).

Testing by Road & Track "recorded zero to 60 mph (97 km/h) in 10.5 seconds, and a top speed of 106 mph (171 km/h)." Consumer Guide staff, though, found the new V8 to be sluggish and ill-suited to the car, with its added weight negatively affecting handling, a consideration that, along with poor visibility, uncomfortable seating, and very low fuel economy, contributed to them ranking it last that year in their Low-Priced Sport Car category. The Mustang II's 302 cu in (4.9 L) engine was called the "5.0 L" even though its capacity was 4,942 cc (4.9 L; 301.6 cu in).

Other than the optional V8 engine, the car underwent minor changes in 1975. The Ghia received opera windows and a padded vinyl half-top, as well as a plush Silver Luxury Group option. Ford sales literature continued to emphasize the car's potential similarity to the era's personal luxury models, with the cover of its main dealership brochure calling the Mustang II Ford's "small, sporty personal car." In mid-year, a 2.3 L "MPG" model was added, featuring a catalytic converter and a 3.18:1 rear-axle ratio (standard was 3.40:1) to claim EPA-version economy estimates of 23 mpg_{‑US} (10 L/100 km; 28 mpg_{‑imp}) in the city and 34 mpg_{‑US} (6.9 L/100 km; 41 mpg_{‑imp}) on the highway. To underscore fuel efficiency, all base 2.3 L Mustang IIs were called MPG after 1975.

The Mustang II achieved record sales for 1975, making it the 9th best-selling Mustang of all time, with 199,199 sold. Consumer Guide, however, noted that the car's sales had fallen by nearly fifty percent from 1974 levels.

=== 1976 ===
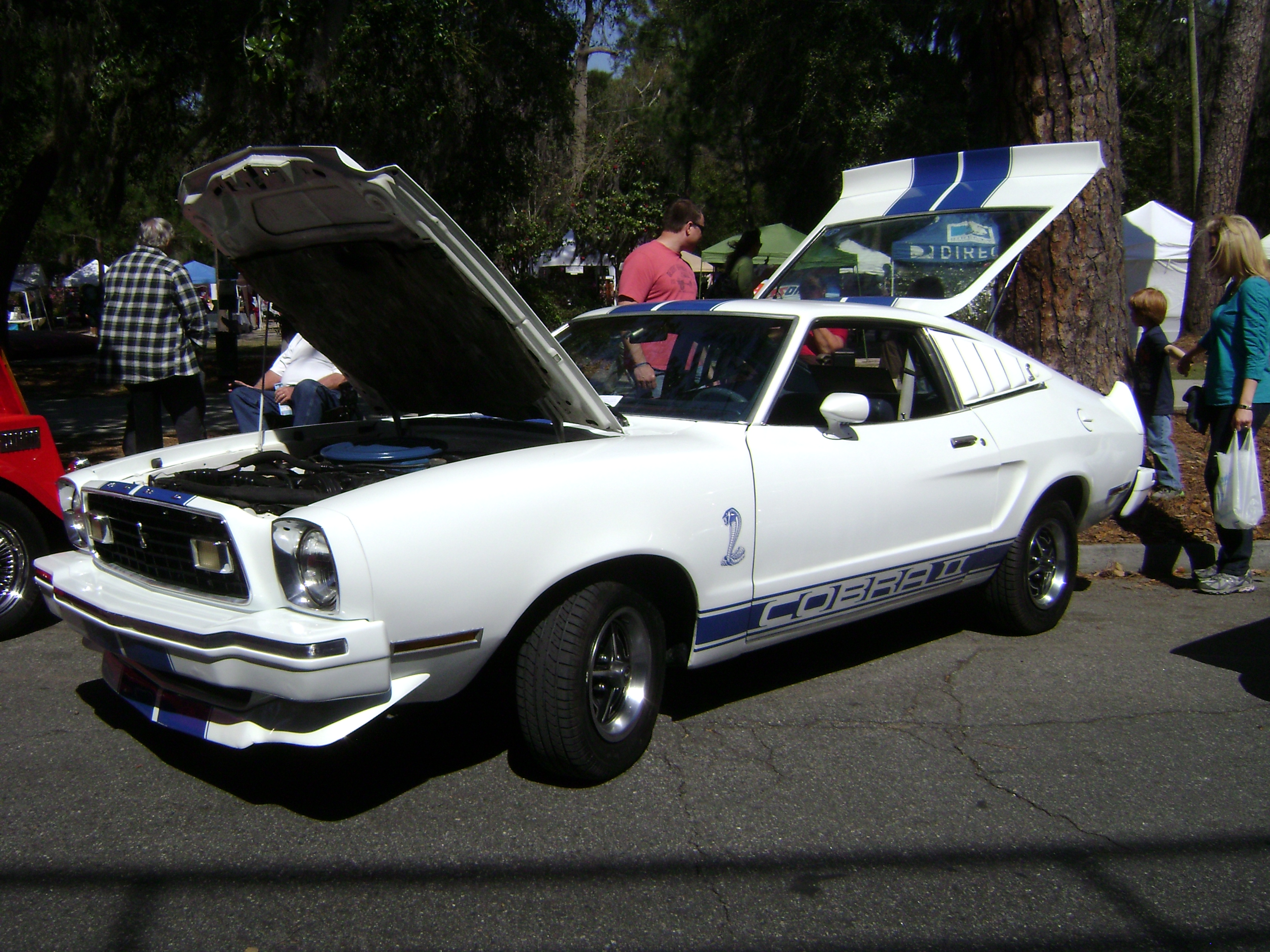
1976 Mustang II Cobra II

In 1976 only, Ford offered the "Stallion" appearance group, including styled wheels, blacked-out grille, bumpers, and body moldings, as well as black two-toned accent paint offered with silver, red, white, and yellow body colors. The foray into increased performance emphasis also included a new All-Black Sport Group option for the Mach I and an optional Rallye Package, both adding minor performance enhancements along with the sportier trim.

New also was the "Cobra II" appearance package, with a black grille, simulated hood scoop, front and rear spoilers, quarter window louvers, and dual over-the-top racing stripes with matching lower rocker stripes and cobra emblems on the front fenders, echoing the appearance of the original 1965–68 Shelby Mustangs – available with all engine choices. The Cobra II was popular with the public, with Consumer Guide calling it an "instant success" that likely increased Mustang II's sales across the board. Automotive historian Gary Witzenburg observed that "properly equipped, the thing actually performed pretty well by 1976 standards." Full instrumentation was standard.

For the luxurious Ghia, 1975's Silver Luxury Group was replaced by a broader Ghia Luxury Group option, with more colors available in its plush velour interiors, exterior accents, and landau roofs. A manual moon roof was optional. Sales literature continued to refer to the Mustang II as Ford's "small, sporty personal car."

Following continuing public concern about fuel efficiency, Consumer Guide that year tested a 4-cylinder Ghia with a 4-speed manual transmission, an increasingly popular configuration. Staff found that performance was quite poor for a supposed sporty car and ranked it at the bottom of their Low-Priced Sports Car category.

=== 1977 ===
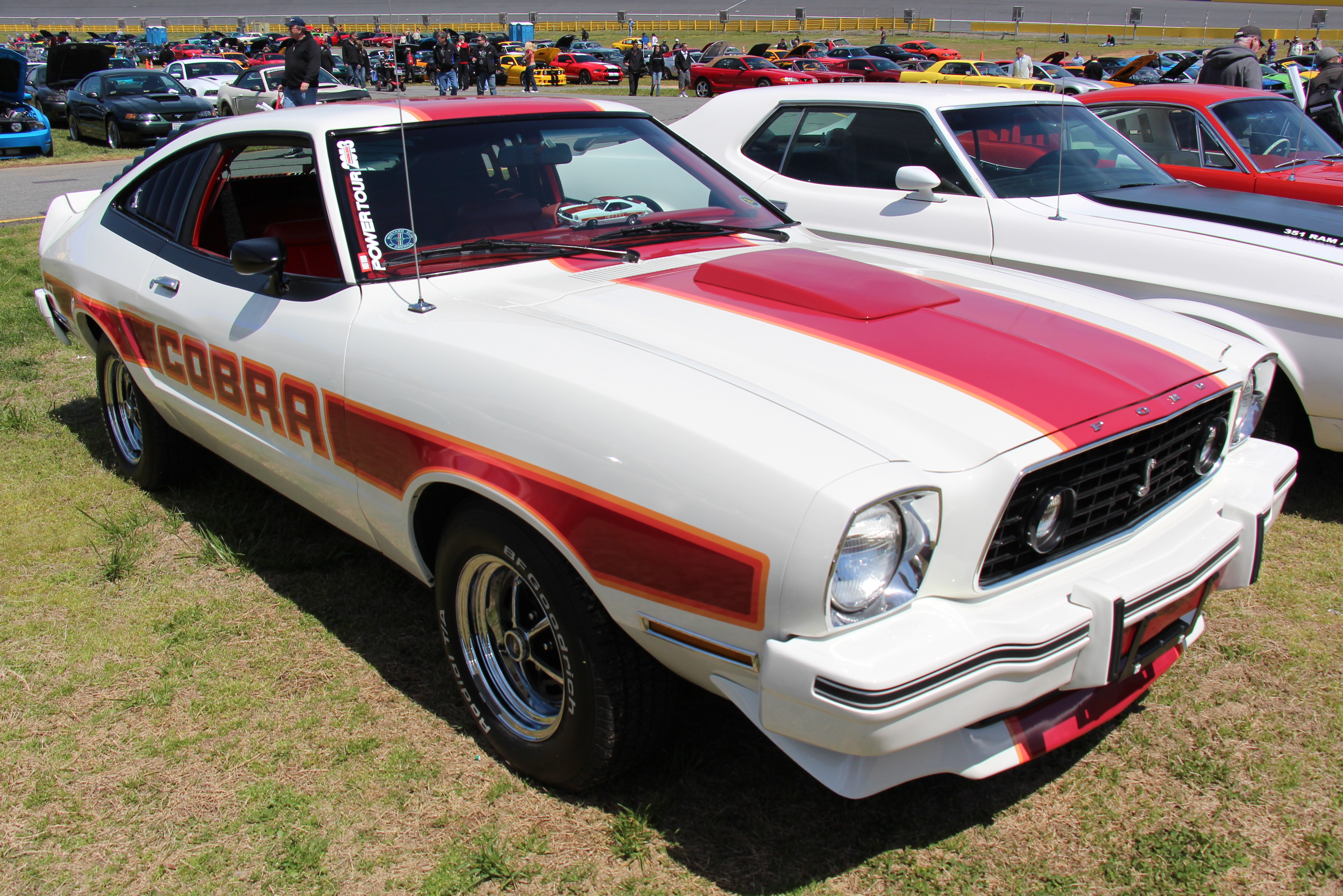
1977½ Cobra II with revised graphics.

Capitalizing on the sales success of the previous year's racy-looking Cobra II, Mustang II sales literature for 1977 emphasized the more sporty aspects of the car, with the words "Sweet Handling" the featured catchphrase on the cover of that year's Mustang II dealership brochure (though a luxury Ghia model still got pride of place there). Along these lines, the 1977 model year introduced a "Ghia Sports Group" for the Ghia model that was color-matched to either black or tan paint, as well as several minor styling changes and expanded color options for the Cobra II. Also new was a T-top option for the fastback, featuring twin removable tinted glass panels.

Midway through the 1977 model year, changes for the 1978 model year were pulled ahead to sell early. It is most notable on the Cobra II models, where the hood scoop was turned around to seem more aerodynamic and the graphics were revised. For the decals, the over-the-top dual stripes running the length of the car were replaced with a single stripe, and on the sides of the car, the snake and "COBRA II" decals were replaced with large stripes raised to the middle of the body sides with large "COBRA" lettering in the middle. Louvers were added to the hatch and the side panel louvers only came in black. All of the glass moldings were painted black. With these mid-year changes, for the first time, Mustang II sales brochures featured a sporty 2+2 hatchback model, with its fastback lines, on the cover instead of one of the more formal-looking notchback or Ghia models. This new cover model featured the available T-top roof with a bright wrap wrap-over band.

=== 1978 ===
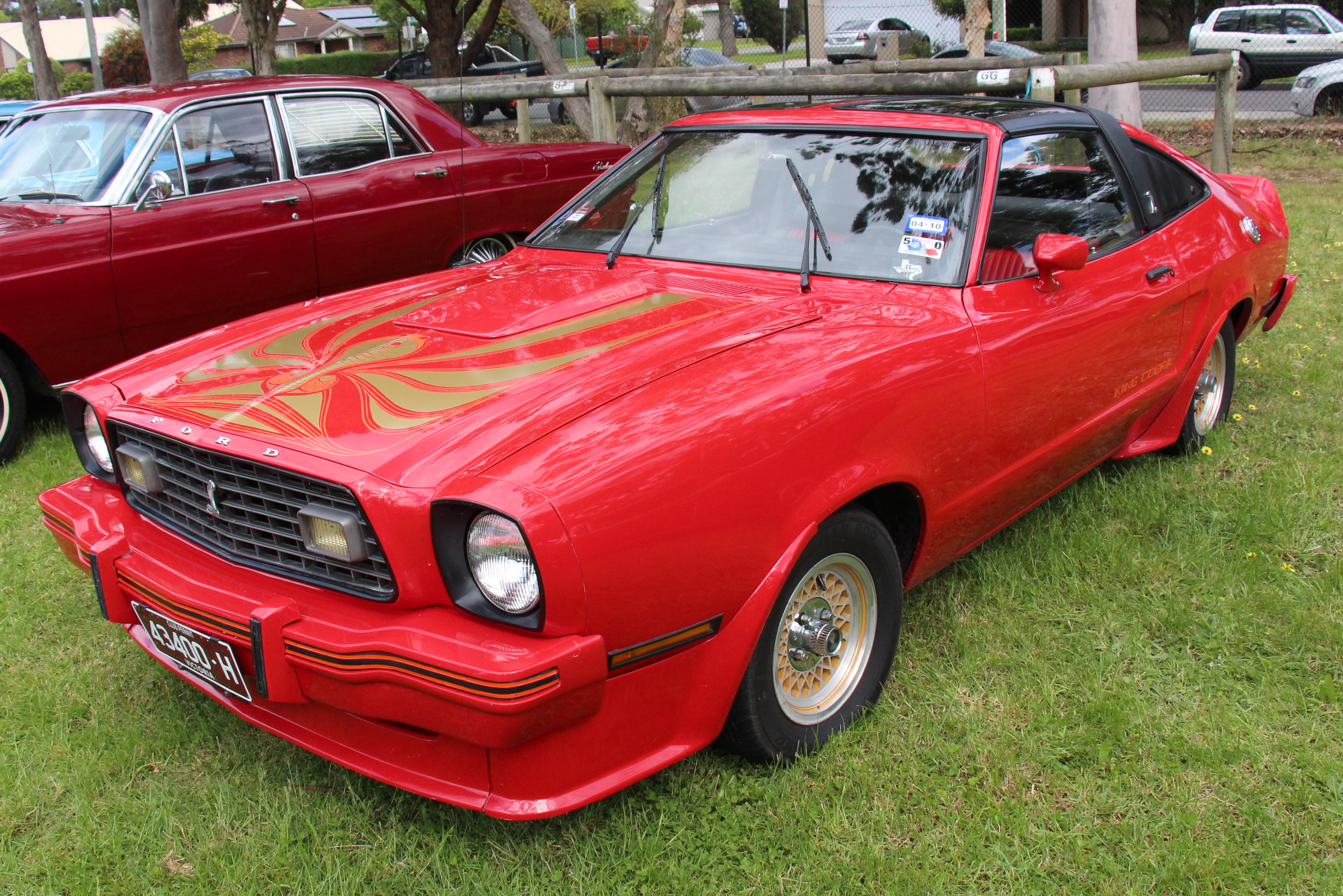
1978 Mustang II King Cobra

In 1978, the "King Cobra" became available. This was a limited-edition version with 4,313 units produced. It featured a deep air-dam, stripes, and a "Pontiac Trans Am style" cobra snake decal on the hood. The King Cobra was available only with the V8 to help bolster the car's performance image.

Following a marketing change initiated the previous model year, Mustang II sales literature continued to emphasize sportiness over the luxury that had been emphasized for most of the Mustang II's existence, again placing the 2+2 hatchback model with the optional T-top roof on the cover of the sales brochure.

A "chic" Fashion Accessory Package was also offered this year, featuring Southwest-looking, striped "Fresno cloth" seating, enhanced interior lighting, vanity pockets, and special pinstriping.

Consumer Guide tested a Mustang II Cobra II that year and found that its power just exceeded that of its closest competitors in the Sporty class, the Chevrolet Monza and its General Motors siblings, but that it ranked very low in handling and ride, with a marked tendency to lean despite its performance suspension.

On the momentum of the Mustang II's successful sales, a new Ford Mustang (third generation) would be introduced for the 1979 model year.

== Reviews ==
=== Contemporary ===
The Mustang II was named Motor Trend's Car of the Year, in 1974, the last Mustang to achieve that honor until 1994. Nevertheless, there were also mixed contemporary reviews including Consumer Reports reporting that "there are better subcompacts on the market than the Mustang II" and recommended the AMC Gremlin as a car that was at least as good, and in some respects superior, in terms of seating, noise level, normal and emergency handling, and acceleration; and Road & Track described that the Ford was neither fast nor particularly good handling.

Consumer reaction to the Mustang II was enthusiastic with a combined total production of the 1974–1978 models exceeding 1.1 million. "As the smallest, lightest Mustang since the original, it was a fresh start for Ford's pony car and a refreshing return to rationality. And it couldn't have been better timed, introduced just two months before the first "Energy Crisis" upended America. People came in droves to see the Mustang II – and to buy." "Not only did gasoline prices spike up, but its very supply looked to be in jeopardy. Economy immediately became a hot item, and this helped boost the smaller Mustang's first calendar year sales to 385,993."

According to automotive historian Patrick Foster, "Ford executives decided to call the car 'Mustang II', since it was a new type of pony car designed for an era of high gas prices and fuel shortages". "Many people have never warmed up to the Mustang II, some even complaining it reminds them of the Pinto. But in its day, the public and the press sang praises for the little Mustang II. After all, a car with excellent fuel efficiency, sporty looks and a low price tag will always find acceptance. Mustang II was a success, simply because it was the right car at the right time."

Automotive journalist, Michael Lamm, described Ford's Mustang II as "the best idea of the year" with the new model arriving on the market just in time "in the real world of shrinking space, limited energy, and precious little clean air, dreamboat cars are out" ... this car "proves that the new breed of small cars can still be exciting!"

=== Modern day ===
Writers of the past few years tend to ignore the sales success of the Mustang II, pointing out flaws in the design compared to cars that came before and after, symbolizing the very start of the Malaise era in American auto design.

Opinions include noting in 2003 that if there were any steps forward in technology with the Pinto chassis, it was that it had a rack-and-pinion steering gear rather than the Falcon's recirculating ball, and front disc brakes were standard," Edmunds Inside Line wrote of the Mustang II: "It was too small, underpowered, handled poorly, terribly put together, ill-proportioned, chintzy in its details and altogether subpar.

According to Edmunds, the 1974 base engine's 88 hp (66 kW; 89 PS) was "truly pathetic" and the optional V6's 105 hp (78 kW; 106 PS) was "underwhelming" (with the addition of mandatory catalytic converters in 1975 these outputs fell to 83 and 97 hp (72 kW) respectively). In 1976, the "standard four-cylinder swelled to a heady 92 hp (69 kW; 93 PS), the V6 increased to 102 hp (76 kW), and sales were a surprisingly stable 187,567 units – a mere 1,019 less than in '75." In 1977, the engines' power outputs dropped again to 89 and 93 hp (69 kW; 94 PS), respectively, and production dropped "about 18 percent to 153,117 cars."

Writers of today ignore the rave reviews of 1974–1978 models, and one even describes the Mustang II as "lamentable." The New York Times said in 2006 that defective steering, together with a fuel tank of the same design as in the Pinto, a car "forever infamous for exploding when struck in the rear," caused owners anxiety that was "heightened by the fact that some Mustang IIs had Firestone 500 tires, notorious in the 70's for widespread failures." It continued: "Ford, not content to drag the revered Mustang name through the mud...added badges from Ghia, the venerable Italian studio that it had bought, to versions of the Mustang II with partial vinyl roofs and tacky opera windows."

A 1995 book on the history of the Mustang refers to the introduction of "a lukewarm optional 302 V8 in 1975" and says that "the token revival of the Cobra name – appearing as the taped-and-striped Cobra II – the following year did little to stem the tide as customers grew less enchanted with the Mustang II's cramped quarters and weak performance." There was "a steady slide in 1976 and '77." Despite the 25-percent rise in sales for 1978, "not even the high-profile Cobra with its flashy decals and snazzy spats and spoilers could save the day for the second-generation Mustang."

According to a 2003 retrospective by Edmunds Inside Line, the 1978 King Cobra "wasn't much more than a Cobra II with revised graphics and the hood scoop turned around backward..." This model was "visually about as nutty a Mustang as has ever been built" but mysteriously, production climbed to 192,410 units."

The automotive editor of Mustang Monthly magazine describes "The Mustang II was the right car at the right time to keep the legend going into the future." The automaker noted that Mustang II has been "maligned by hardcore pony-car fans as the black sheep of the family almost since it went on sale," but "without the new direction forged by Mustang II, Ford almost certainly wouldn't be celebrating 50 years of Mustang today."

Ford hosted the first "National Mustang II Reunion" in 2016 at the company's offices where the pony car re-invented "for an all-new era when build quality and fuel efficiency were more important to buyers than no-frill options and high-horsepower."
