= Malaise era =

Period in American automotive history

The malaise era was a period in the U.S. automotive industry from roughly the early 1970s to the early to mid 1980s, characterized by malaise, i.e., poor products and a generalized industry unease.

Around this time, the U.S. federal government introduced, in quick succession, a triumvirate of increasingly strict and comprehensive emissions, fuel efficiency and safety standards, — severely challenging the industry's ability to adapt, requiring massive diversion of spending and leading to a marked drop in vehicle performance, ambitious product downsizing and ill-resolved styling adaptations.

== Background ==
Following decades where the U.S. automotive industry had been almost completely unregulated by government mandates and could prioritize unrestrained horsepower, size and styling, the malaise era arose after the Clean Air Act of 1963 began to codify a legislative response to serious national car-generated air quality concerns, and Ralph Nader's 1965 Unsafe at Any Speed galvanized attention on U.S. automotive safety issues, calling for a range of safety features from critical occupant protection to car bumpers that could enable low-speed impact without damage to safety systems. With an average fuel consumption across passenger cars from 1969-1974 of 13.5 mpg_{‑US} (17.4 L/100 km), the period coincided with the industry's dependence on inexpensive foreign oil and spiking international fuel prices, culminating with the 1973 oil crisis.

In response, the U.S. federal government introduced successively more comprehensive emissions, fuel efficiency and safety standards. These required huge automotive engineering investments in effectively new disciplines, testing the industry's ability to adapt.

As a hallmark of the era, with automotive design budgets dominated by huge pragmatic investments in fuel efficiency, emissions controls and safety programs, the engine power of prominent sports and muscle cars of 1960s was decimated. Manufacturers often relied heavily on badge engineering, and expedient styling tropes, in marked contrast to prior decades of unbound automotive power and styling. The era also highlighted the U.S. automotive industry's vulnerability to penetration by foreign manufacturers versed in the design of more space and fuel-efficient designs.

When Ford introduced the Granada in North America in 1975, its advertising emphasized the padded vinyl roofing, opera windows, tufted velour interiors with imitation wood accents and stand up hood ornaments of its ostensible luxury. The engineering used a platform dating to the austere 1961 Falcon and offered a power-to-weight ratio of 48.46 lbs per hp, and a 0-60 time of 23.15 seconds.

== Etymology ==
The term malaise era has been widely used in an automotive context by news agencies and automotive sites, including Car and Driver, Consumer Guide, Forbes, Fox News, Hagerty, Hemmings Motor News, Motor Trend, Popular Mechanics, Road & Track, Vanity Fair, and the New York Times.

One of the first known usages of the term in an automotive context was by Jacob M. Schlesinger in The Wall Street Journal in December 1988. In an article discussing the increasing diversification of body styles of American vehicles in the late 1980s, Schlesinger wrote: "Car designers are also getting freer rein. In the malaise era, there was little variation. Virtually all cars adopted the same simple, square, chromeless, earthtone look. ... But no more. Competition in the auto industry is far keener now, and the car companies are doing more to exploit small niches, apply new technologies and stand out through design." The term was later used frequently by Murilee Martin, writing for the website Jalopnik in 2007.

The term recalls President Jimmy Carter's 1979 Malaise Speech, in which he discussed the oil crisis following that year's Iranian Revolution and a wider "crisis of confidence" within the United States that had marked the late 1960s and 1970s. Outside of the discussion of automobiles, the term malaise era was earlier used by Texas Senator Phil Gramm in 1986, discussing John Evans' race against Steve Symms in the 1986 Idaho Senate election, and by Vice President George H. W. Bush in May 1988, challenging the policies of his Democratic opponents in the 1988 presidential election, for which he was the Republican nominee.

Writing for Jalopnik, writer Phil Greden, opined that era spanned from 1975 with U.S. government bumper regulations; to 1983, when the Ford Mustang saw a significant performance increase after almost a decade of low performance.

== Government mandates ==
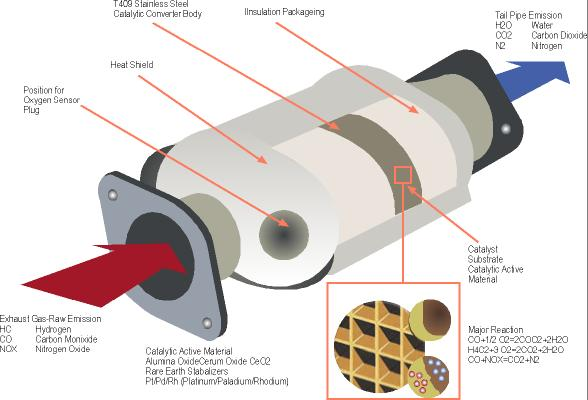
A catalytic exhaust converter

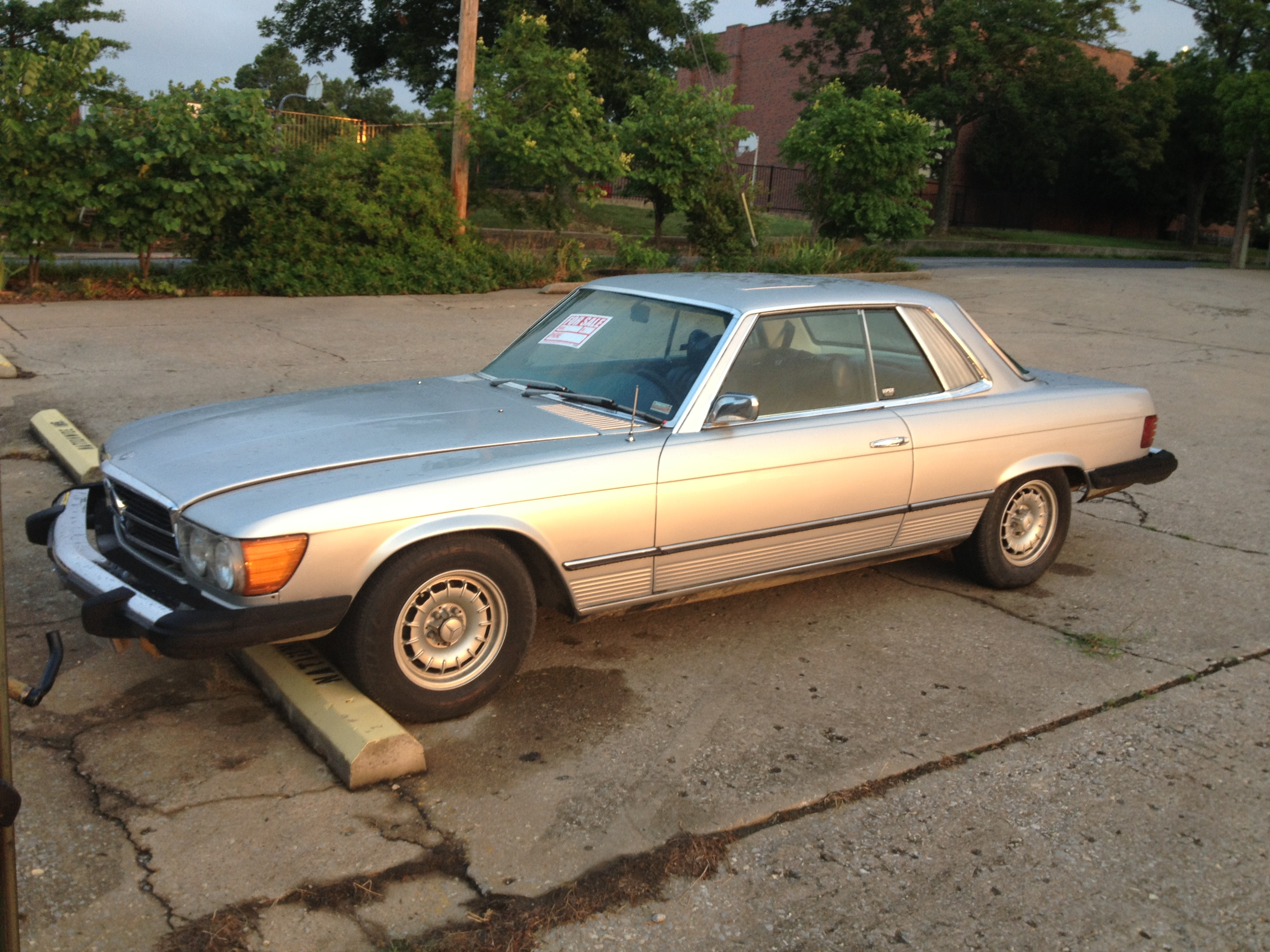
Prominent U.S. 5-mph bumpers on a 1977 Mercedes-Benz 450 SLC

At the close of 1970, President Richard Nixon signed a series of amendments to the Clean Air Act into law. The amendments established the National Ambient Air Quality Standards (NAAQS), New Source Performance Standards (NSPS); and National Emissions Standards for Hazardous Air Pollutants (NESHAPs), and overall significantly strengthened federal enforcement authority, all toward achieving aggressive air pollution reduction goals. The amendments mandated a 90% reduction in hydrocarbons, carbon monoxide, and nitrogen oxides by 1975, relative to the 1970 standards, and instructed the Environmental Protection Agency(which had been formally founded just that month) to implement these standards.

The technology did not exist to meet these requirements in a way that allowed practical engines to continue making the same horsepower. The simplest way for manufacturers to meet these ambitious emissions cuts was to reduce power outputs in their vehicles and so, starting in 1971, horsepower ratings for many American automobiles began to drop markedly. However, a substantial part of these drops were merely on paper, caused by a concurrent legal change in how engine power was quoted. The change was from gross to net horsepower (aligning the U.S. with the rest of the world) which resulted in lower numbers being used to describe the same engine. For example, the 350 cu in (5.7 L) L48 engine of a 1971 Chevrolet Corvette was rated at 270 (gross) horsepower, but the identical engine was rated at 200 (net) horsepower in 1972. However, emission-driven detuning resulted in notable real power cuts, starting from the 1971 model year. These changes were initially due to a reduction in compression ratios to allow engines to run on lower octane unleaded gasoline rather than fuel using dangerous and polluting lead additives (a move taken initially by General Motors, but which all other major American automotive manufacturers adopted). Many automotive manufacturers dropped horsepower ratings from their advertising, using cubic inch engine size instead.

More significant power reduction effects were caused by the adoption or increased use of emissions control procedures such as secondary air injectors (often called "smog pumps"), exhaust gas recirculation, retarded ignition, and thermal reactors. For example, Pontiac's 455 cu. in. V8 peaked at 310 net horsepower in 1973, but was down to 200 net hp in its last year of use, in 1976. As these changes were legislative in nature rather than the result of voluntary developments by American car companies, as well as aggressive in scope and with a rapid deadline, the emission control technologies used were hastily implemented and initially resulted in reliability issues, creating stalls and reducing fuel economy over and above power drops.

The new emission standards also spurred the deployment of the catalytic converter, added to almost all new vehicles from the 1975 model year onward, which in turn resulted in the increasing adoption of unleaded gasoline, as the converters could not function if leaded gasoline was used.

In addition to new environmental standards, new design standards had a significant effect as well. Starting in 1971, the National Highway Traffic Safety Administration (NHTSA) promulgated bumper regulations requiring specific bumper performance requirements in collisions from passenger vehicles (but not light duty trucks and motorcycles) at certain low speeds and angles. Specifically, this mandated the vehicle sustain no damage at 5 mph (8 km/h), at an exact bumper height. Except for Canada, no other nation adopted this mandate.

In 1982, the U.S. relaxed this rule to 3 mph (4.8 km/h) collision, where it remains.

This increased bumper size and weight beginning with the 1973 model year, and these standards were further tightened for the 1974 model year.

The regulations specified bumper performance; they did not prescribe any particular bumper design. Nevertheless, similar to how emissions standards were tackled, automotive manufacturers often at first took the simplest path. Cars were equipped with bulky, unsightly, protruding bumpers to be compliant. This meant additional vehicle length and greater weight.

Bumpers today are designed very differently from those during the 5-mph bumper era, in that they are made of foam to avoid the weight of rigid steel bars at vehicle extremities, prioritizing occupant crumple zone protection over insurance claims.

== 1973 oil crisis ==
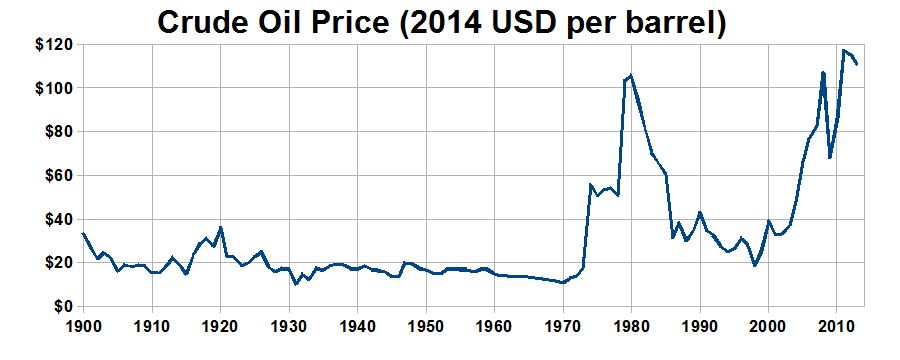
Price of crude oil in 2014 U.S. dollars from 1900 to 2014

The 1973 oil crisis caused a sudden and marked increase in the cost of oil and, by extension, gasoline. By the end of the crisis, in March 1974, the price of oil had nearly quadrupled, from U.S. $3 per barrel ($22 in 2025 dollars) to nearly $12 globally ($87 in 2025 dollars). U.S. prices were significantly higher.

The result was a sudden switch in consumer taste from traditional domestic automobiles with high gas-consumption rates to more efficient compact cars. Announcements from insurers such as State Farm that an annual premium surcharge of 25% would be added for performance cars rated at over 300 horsepower further dampened consumer demand for traditional designs.

The shift towards smaller, more efficient vehicles benefitted foreign manufacturers, who produced more of such vehicles. By 1975, 18.3% of U.S. sales were imported cars. American brands had their slowest year since 1962, selling just 7,050,120 cars in 1975, down from 9.6 million cars sold in 1973. The success of Japanese brands can be traced to the greater selection of compact cars and the development of technologies to improve fuel efficiency. For example, Honda's CVCC technology allowed its cars to pass emission standards without a catalytic converter.

Sales of larger domestic cars rebounded in 1977 and 1978, but the 1979 oil crisis caused oil and gas prices to again increase significantly, doubling over 12 months, and there was a further shift in customer preference to smaller, more efficient vehicles.

The EPA began regulating for fuel efficiency in this period. The Corporate Average Fuel Economy (CAFE) standard was passed into law in 1975, requiring that the fuel economy of a manufacturer's entire output of passenger car and light truck models be averaged into a miles-per-gallon fuel economy standard, which was then used as the basis for further legislation. For example, in 1978 Congress mandated that manufacturers achieve a fleet average of 18 mpg by 1978, 19 mpg by 1979, and 20 mpg by 1980, rising to 27.5 mpg by 1985. Similarly, the 1978 Energy Tax Act levied a "gas-guzzler" tax to the sale of new vehicles that failed to meet CAFE standards, as an attempt to discourage the creation and purchase of inefficient vehicles. By the approximate close of the "malaise era" in 1983, average fuel efficiency for passenger cars had not met these targets, but had risen to 17.1 mpg_{‑US} (13.8 L/100 km).

== Effects on automakers ==
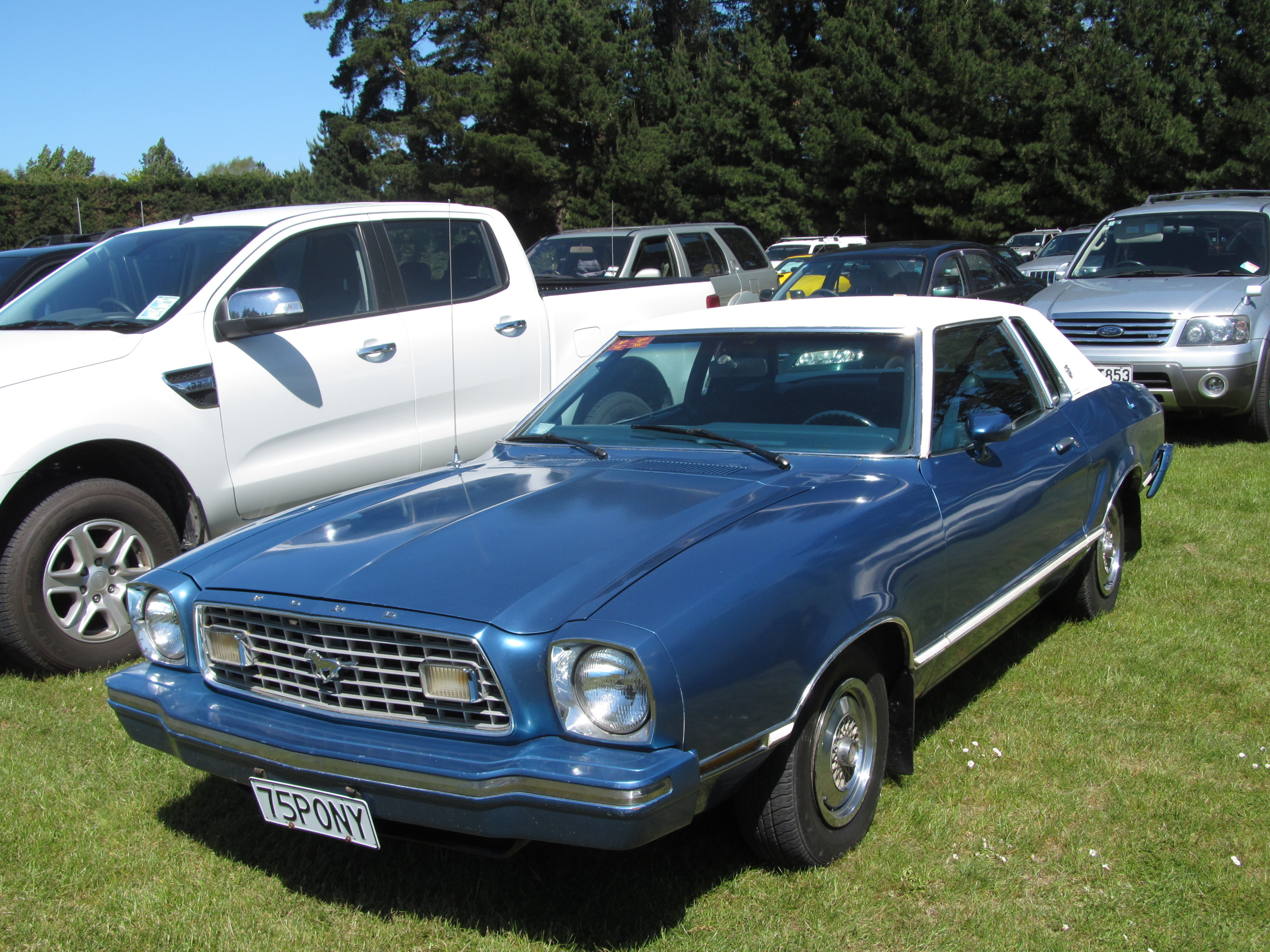
The Ford Mustang II, produced between 1974 and 1978, is sometimes cited as one of many vehicles that embodied the Malaise Era.

The cumulative effect of these changes on the car lineups of American manufacturers was a series of redesigns and discontinuations of engine types and vehicle models and an overall lowering of performance. Safety regulations also led to a major shift away from the ornate styling that post-war American cars were known for in favor of sleeker, simpler designs with sharper edges that would be a staple of Malaise-era cars.

Ford, General Motors and Chrysler also called upon their European divisions who had the necessary expertise in designing smaller, more fuel efficient vehicles, and in some cases adapted their European designs for the US market. Ford for instance, imported the 1970 Mercury Capri and its first generation 1978 Fiesta, whilst GM leveraged its Opel division to design the sub-compact/compact T-body and J-body platforms. Chrysler opted to bring entire models drawn from its European subsidiaries Rootes and Simca, respectively the 1972 Plymouth Cricket and the jointly developed Dodge Omni/Plymouth Horizon.

The first generation Mustang was cancelled after the 1973 model year, replaced with the Ford Mustang II, a platform which in its first year was over a foot shorter in length and some 800 pounds lighter, but also peaked at 105 net horsepower compared to the previous years' (already emission-reduced) maximum of 266 net horsepower. Some cars were redesigned to fit in entirely different automotive categories: the Mercury Cougar and the Dodge Charger were transformed from muscle cars to personal luxury cars for the 1974 and 1975 model years, respectively, while the Chevrolet Nova became a luxury-oriented compact. Chevrolet continued to offer its Chevelle, but discontinued its SS performance option after the 1973 model year, while the AMC Javelin, Dodge Challenger, Plymouth Barracuda, and Pontiac GTO were all cancelled entirely after the 1974 model year.

American automakers began introducing smaller, less powerful and more fuel efficient models to comply with new mileage requirements and compete against foreign manufacturers, particularly the Japanese offerings. Regardless, the sales of imports continued to climb. In 1978, GM sold over 5 million cars, but by 1982 they sold about 3.5 million, a decrease of 34.2%. Other American manufacturers saw similar losses; Ford sales fell 47% and Chrysler sales dropped 27% from 1978 to 1982. In the same years, Toyota sales increased from 441,800 cars to 527,128 cars, a 19.3% increase. Japanese automakers Honda and Datsun saw increases of 33.1% and 39.1% respectively. A year after the onset of the 1979 oil crisis, Japanese manufacturers surpassed Detroit's production totals, becoming the world's largest automotive industry, a position it would retain for three decades. Indeed, the share of Japanese cars in U.S. auto purchases rose from 9% in 1976 to 21% in 1980.

== End of the era ==
As the industry adapted to new emissions, efficiency and safety demands and the fuel crisis receded, vehicle performance began to increase again as technologies matured: onboard computers, electronic fuel injection, three-way catalytic converter and modern oxygen sensors enabled greater raw performance and less hobbling emission controls. Writing for Hagerty, Rob Sass argues that the era ended between 1985—when American commercial sports cars such as the Ford Mustang and Buick Regal reached the 200 hp mark again—and 1987, when the U.S. national speed limit was raised from 55 mph (89 km/h), a fuel-saving measure enacted in 1974, to 65 mph (105 km/h).

Design-wise, the "boxy" look characteristic of Malaise-era cars was gradually replaced by a more aerodynamic approach to styling beginning with the 1983 Buick and Pontiac lines, the success of the Ford Taurus marking a turning point in the mid-late 1980s. The last remnants of the Malaise-era look, the Ford LTD Crown Victoria and the Cadillac Brougham, were discontinued after the 1991 and the 1992 model years, respectively.

== Legacy ==
Numerous journalists have reflected on the reduced performance and perceived aesthetic deficiencies of cars offered to Americans in this era. One journalist described this period of automotive history as the "worst era in car design". Another journalist wrote that cars of this era were "bloated, underpowered, and uninspired".

Despite complaints against cars from this era and claims that they would never appreciate in value, select vehicles from the 1970s and 1980s started becoming more popular in the late 2010s. Their increase in popularity led to the creation of car shows dedicated only to cars from this era. According to the Hagerty Price Guide, these cars have recently seen the greatest increase in value when compared to other used cars: 82% of used cars saw no increase in price in 2018, but cars from the 1970s and 1980s increased in value by 24% and 38% respectively in the same year.

== See also ==
- Corporate average fuel economy
