= Mercury Capri =

Capri; Mercury Capri
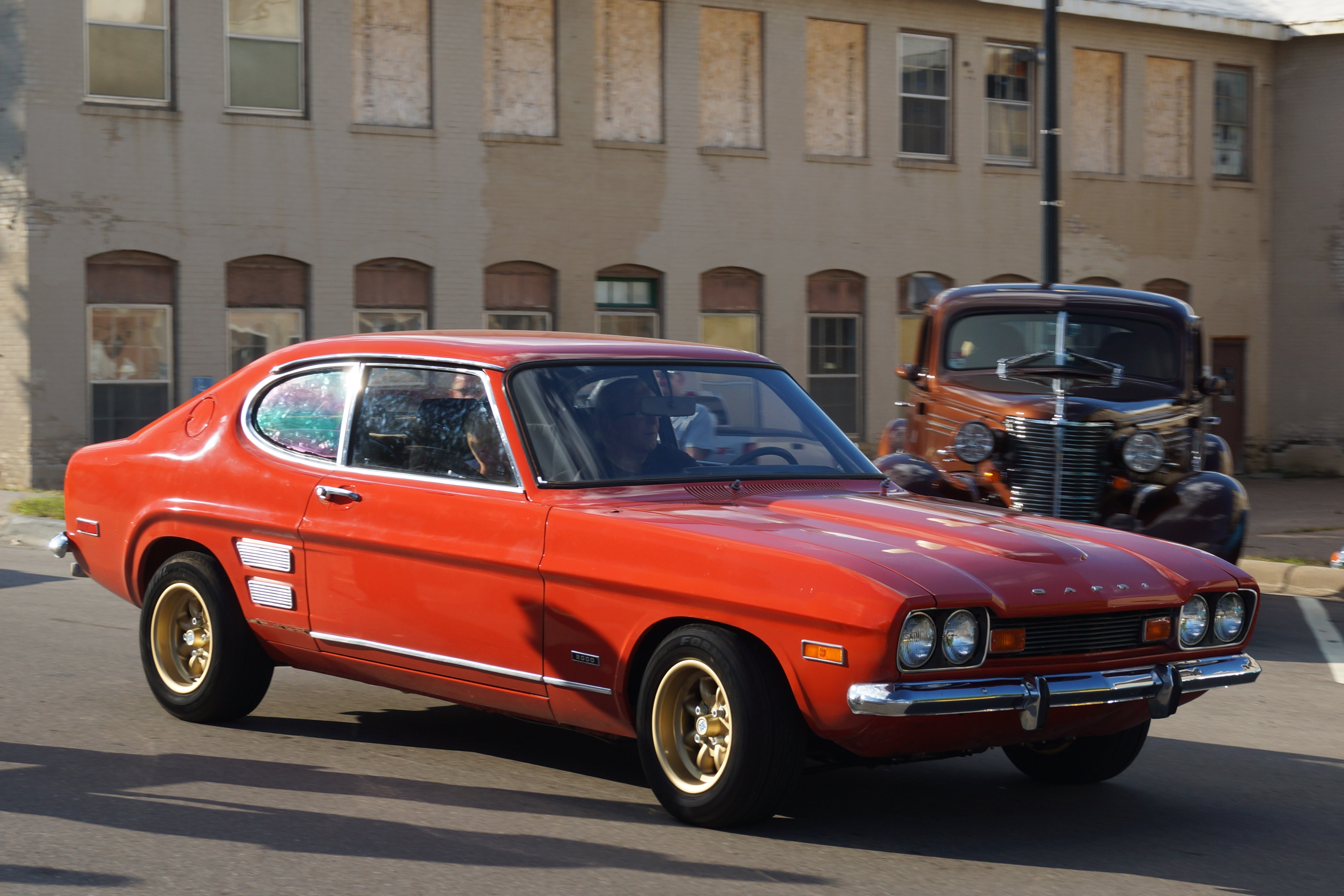
- 1971 Capri

Overview
- Manufacturer: Ford Europe (1970–1978); Mercury (Ford) (1979–1986); Ford Australia (1991–1994)
- Production: 1970–1977; 1979–1986; 1991–1994

Body and chassis
- Class: Sports car (1970–1977); Pony car (1979–1986); Roadster (1991–1994)
- Related: Ford Capri

Capri (later Mercury Capri) is a nameplate marketed by the Lincoln-Mercury division of Ford Motor Company over three generations between 1970 and 1994.

From 1970 to 1978, the Capri was a sport compact marketed in North America by the Lincoln-Mercury division without any Ford or Mercury divisional branding; it was a captive import, manufactured by Ford of Europe and sold simply as the Capri.

From 1979 to 1986, the second generation Capri became part of the Mercury model line as a U.S. built pony car, a badge engineered variant of the contemporary Ford Mustang.

Ford Australia produced the third-generation Mercury Capri roadster from 1991 to 1994, which Ford marketed as the Ford Capri outside of North America.

In North America, the first and third generations of the Capri were marketed without a direct Ford-brand counterpart but were sold in other markets under the Ford brand.

The name derives from the Italian island of Capri, and has been used by all three Ford divisions. The 1952 Lincoln Capri marked the first use of the nameplate, serving as a trim level through 1959. From 1962 to 1964, Ford of Britain introduced a Ford Consul Capri two-door hardtop coupe. For 1966 and 1967, the Capri name was first used by Mercury to denote the standard trim of the Mercury Comet.

For 1968, Ford of Europe developed the Ford Capri two-door coupé as its European counterpart to the Mustang. Like the Mustang, the Capri was styled with a long hood and a short deck, with a fastback-style roofline.

== First generation (1970–1978) ==
First generation
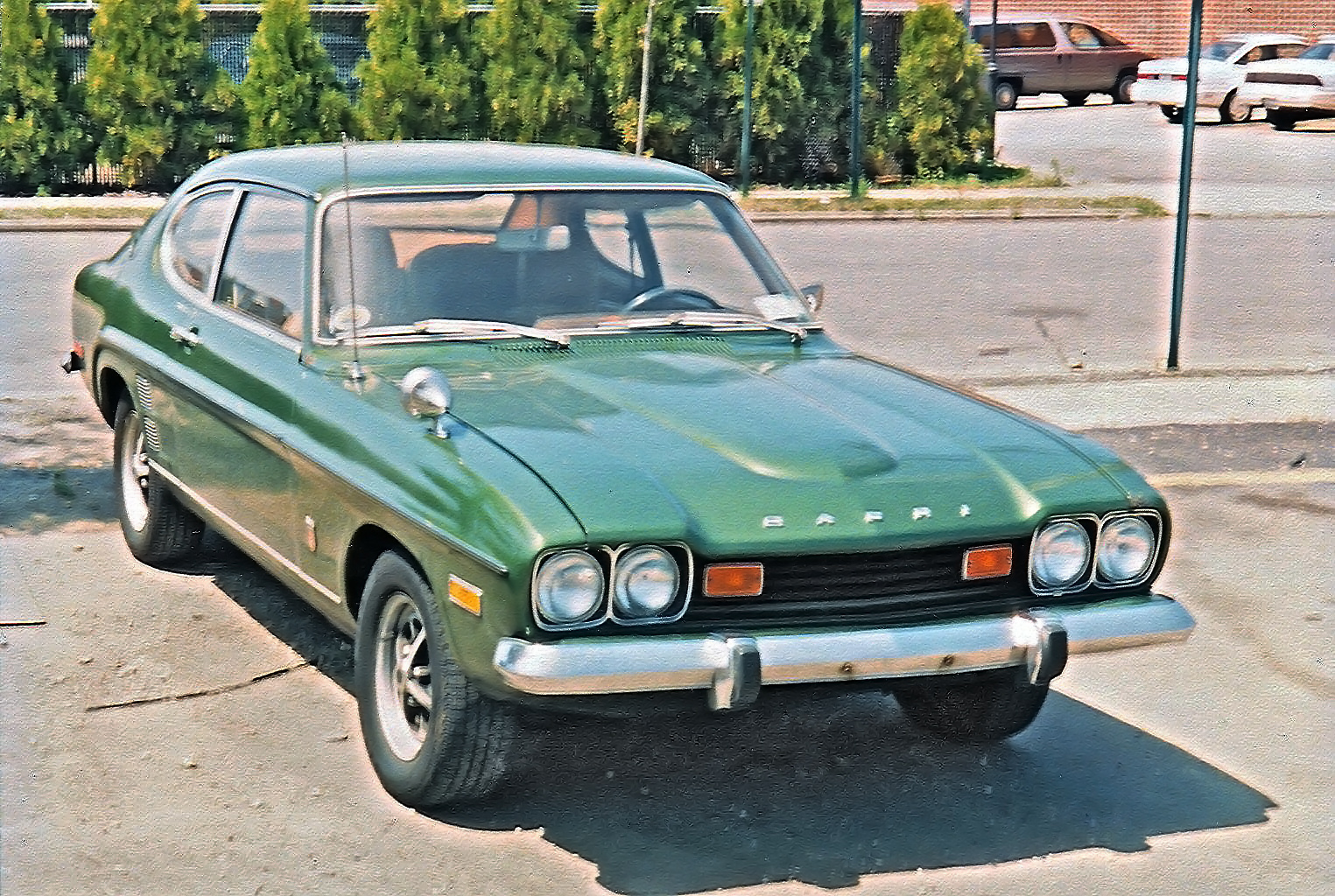
- 1973 Capri 2600

Overview
- Also called: Ford Capri
- Production: 1970–1977
- Model years: 1970–1974; 1976–1978
- Assembly: Germany: Cologne; Germany: Saarlouis

Body and chassis
- Body style: 2-door coupe (1970–1974); 2-door hatchback (1976–1978)
- Layout: FR layout
- Related: Ford Cortina

Powertrain
- Engine: 1.6 L Kent OHV I4; 2.0 L OHC I4; 2.3 L OHC I4; 2.6 L OHV V6; 2.8 L OHV V6
- Transmission: 4-speed manual; 3-speed automatic

Dimensions
- Wheelbase: 100.7 in (2,560 mm)
- Length: 167.8–174.8 in (4,260–4,440 mm)
- Width: 64.8–66.9 in (1,650–1,700 mm)
- Height: 52.0–53.4 in (1,320–1,360 mm)
- Curb weight: 2,250–2,734 lb (1,021–1,240 kg)

=== Capri (1970–1975) ===
The first generation of the Capri was a captive import produced by Ford of Europe in Cologne, Germany. Introduced in Europe for 1968 (and designed by Ford of Britain using locally sourced components from the Cortina MkII and Escort with plans dating back to 1964, when the development of a European variant of the Mustang commenced), the Ford Capri was marketed by the Lincoln-Mercury Division starting in April 1970. While sold through Mercury dealers, the Capri did not carry any divisional identification. Priced at $2,300 at the time of its launch, ($19,068 in 2025 dollars) the Capri was marketed as an economical sporty coupe (with no upscale trim levels, unlike its European-market variants e.g. the GT, RS, L, XL, and XLR which were trim levels), far smaller than the Mercury Cougar and Montego.

In its adaptation to the American market, the Capri saw several minor revisions, with the two rectangular headlights of the Ford Capri replaced by four circular headlamps (shared with some upscale Capri models sold for the European market e.g. the RS or GT - the rectangular lighting did not meet FMVSS 108), grille-mounted turn signals, and side marker lights; Rostyle wheels were fitted as standard equipment. While produced in Germany as a variant of the Ford Cortina, the Capri adopted powertrain commonality with the newly introduced Ford Pinto. Originally powered by a 1.6 L Kent "crossflow" inline-four, the Capri received a 2.0 L "OHC" inline-four for 1971. As an option, for 1972, Mercury introduced a 2.6 L Cologne V6, becoming the first American-market vehicle marketed by Ford Motor Company with a V6 engine. For 1974, the V6 was enlarged to 2.8 L, as Ford revised castings for both the engine block and cylinder heads.

For 1973, the front bumper was revised to comply with 5-mph bumper standards. The previous chrome bumper was reinforced with a steel tube and attached to the frame with shock absorbers (extending the length of the body several inches). As part of the change, the Capri saw revisions to the grille, tail lights, and its rear quarter trim grilles. As part of an interior revision, the Capri was given a new steering wheel, dashboard, and seat trim along with a redesigned wiring harness. For 1974, 5 mph bumpers were fitted to both front and rear, replacing the previous chrome tube bumpers with reinforced body-colored plastic bumpers.

A Mercury version of the Ford Mustang II badged as a Capri (as evidenced by a proposal using the Mustang II's 2+2 body with a rounded rear quarter window style and characteristic bodyside sculpting) was briefly considered, but the strong sales of the Ford Capri (Mk1) as a captive import shelved those plans.

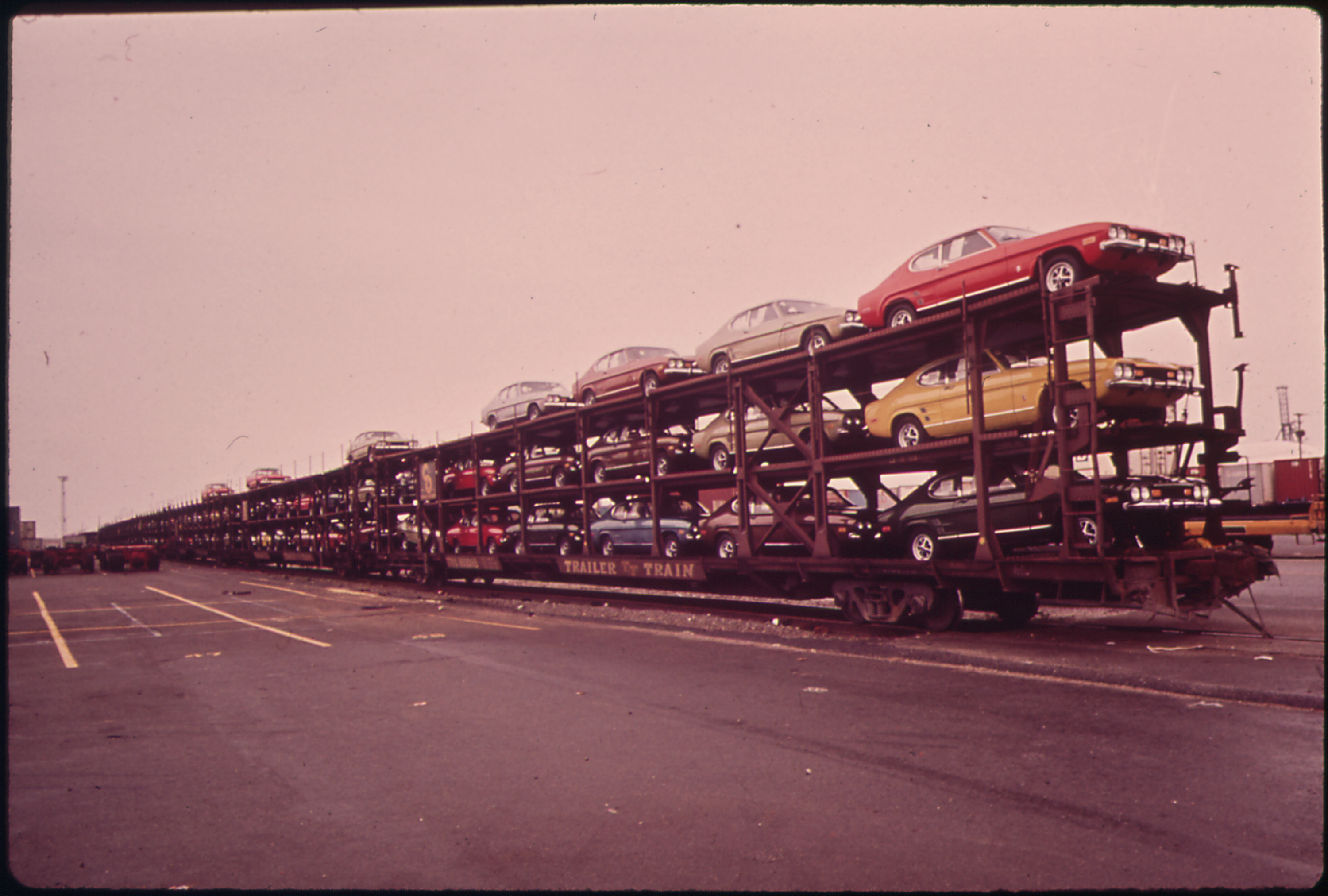
Train car of Capris in Baltimore ship port.

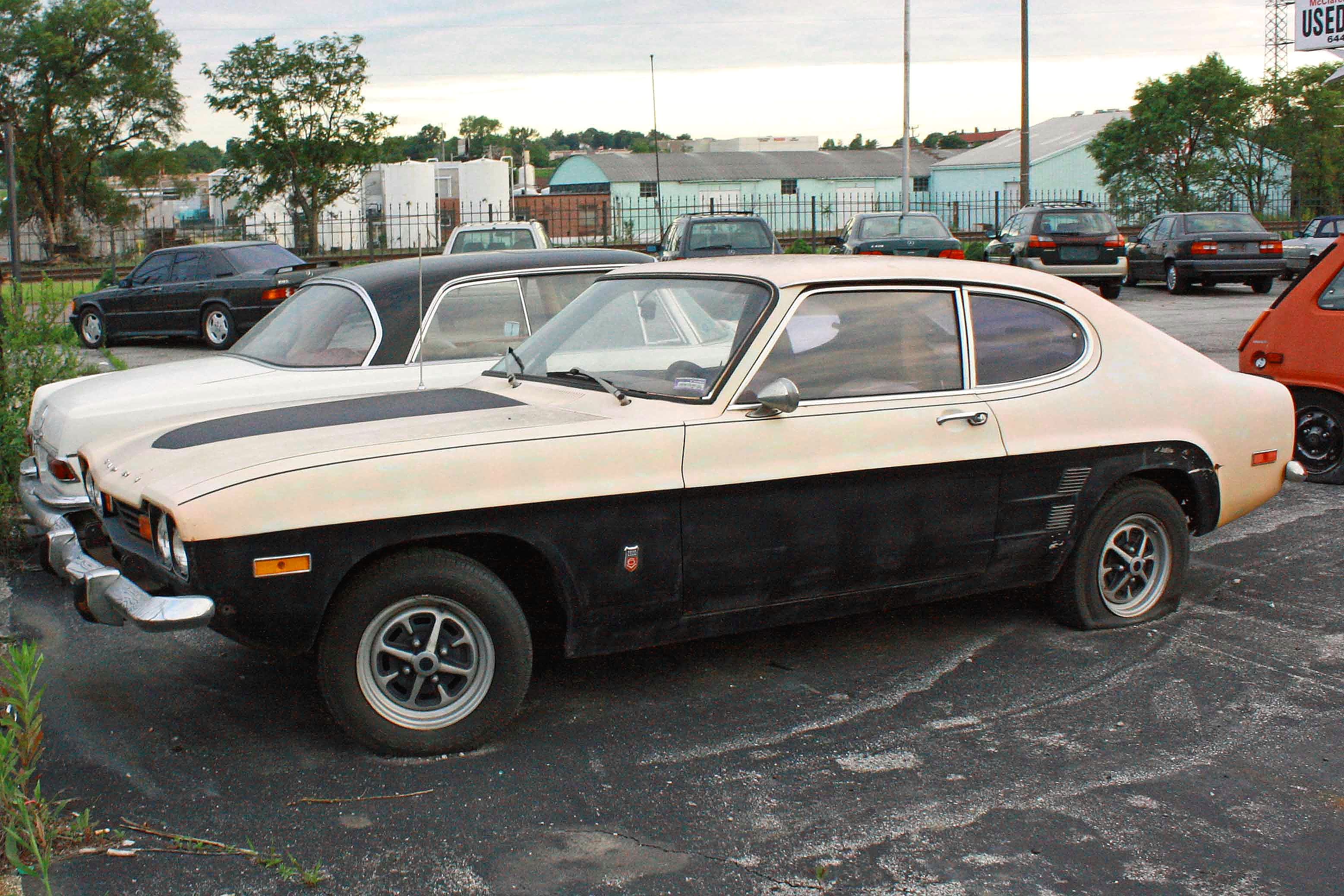
1973 Capri

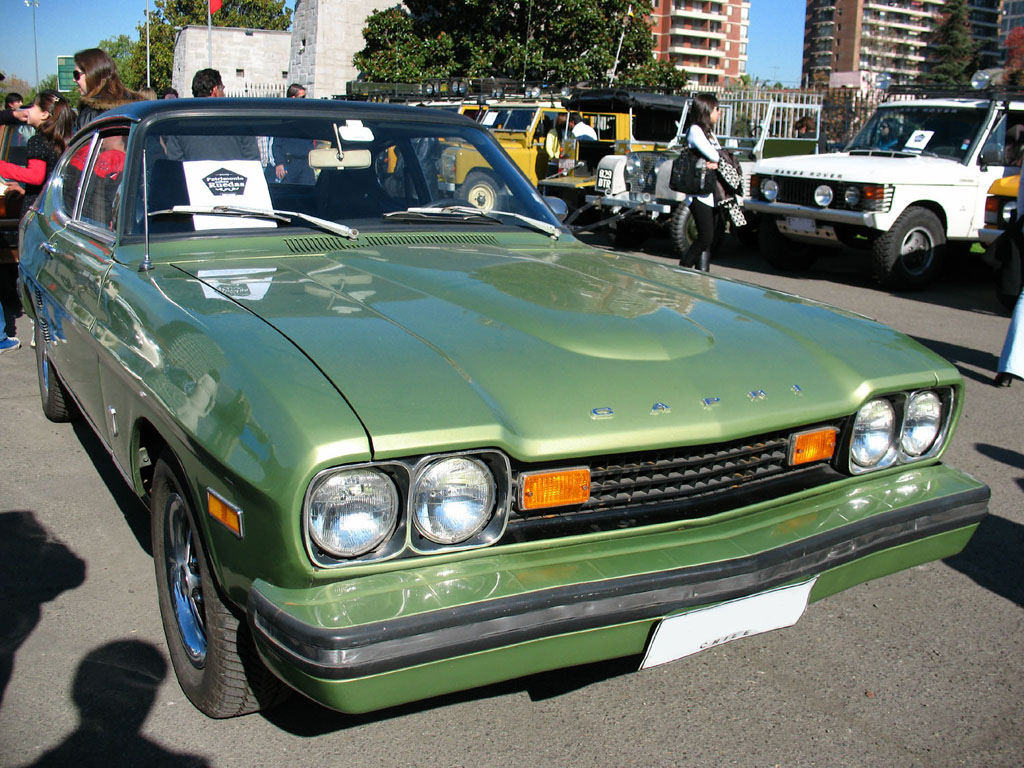
1974 Capri 2800

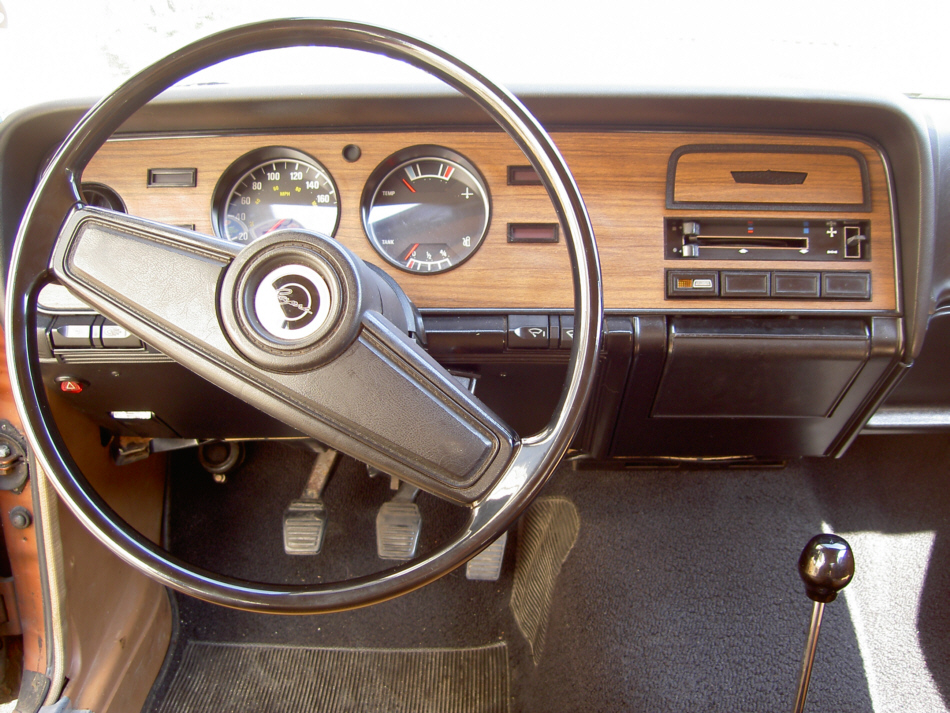
1973 Capri 2000 revised dash, steering wheel

=== Capri II (1976–1978) ===
After the 1974 redesign of the Ford Capri, Lincoln-Mercury commenced American sales of the Capri Mk II in 1975 as an early 1976 model. Skipping the 1975 model year entirely, Lincoln-Mercury renamed the Capri to the Capri II, again omitting any formal divisional identification from the vehicle. While sharing similar styling to its predecessor, the Capri II adopted a hatchback roofline. As with the 1970–1974 Capri, to adapt to the American market, the Capri II was fitted with quad sealed-beam headlamps (foreshadowing the style of the Capri III which was only sold in Europe from 1978 onwards), grille-mounted turn signal lamps, 5-mph bumpers, and body-color side-view mirror(s).

Again maintaining powertrain commonality with the Ford Pinto, Ford Mustang II and Mercury Bobcat, the Capri II was fitted with the 2.3 L OHC engine, offering a 2.8 L V6 as an option.

After the 1977 model year, Lincoln-Mercury ended imports of the Capri II from Ford of Europe, with unsold examples sold during the 1978 model year. In total, 513,500 Capri/Capri IIs were sold from 1970 to 1978 by Lincoln-Mercury. At its peak, yearly Capri sales in North America were the highest for any import vehicle (except for the Volkswagen Beetle). Ford of Europe continued production of the car in "Capri III" form until 1986 - to all intents and purposes a facelifted Capri II.

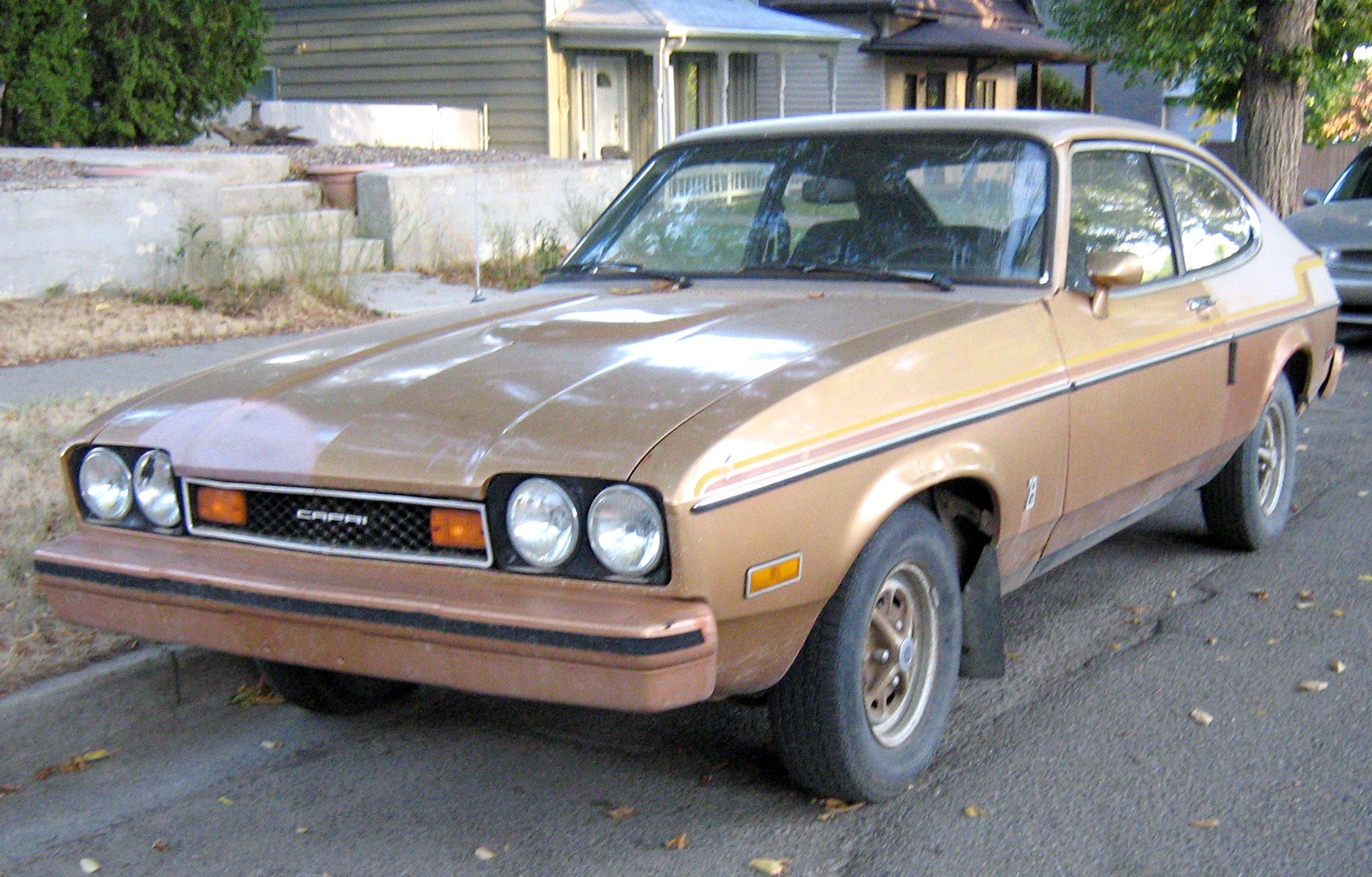
1977 Capri II Ghia

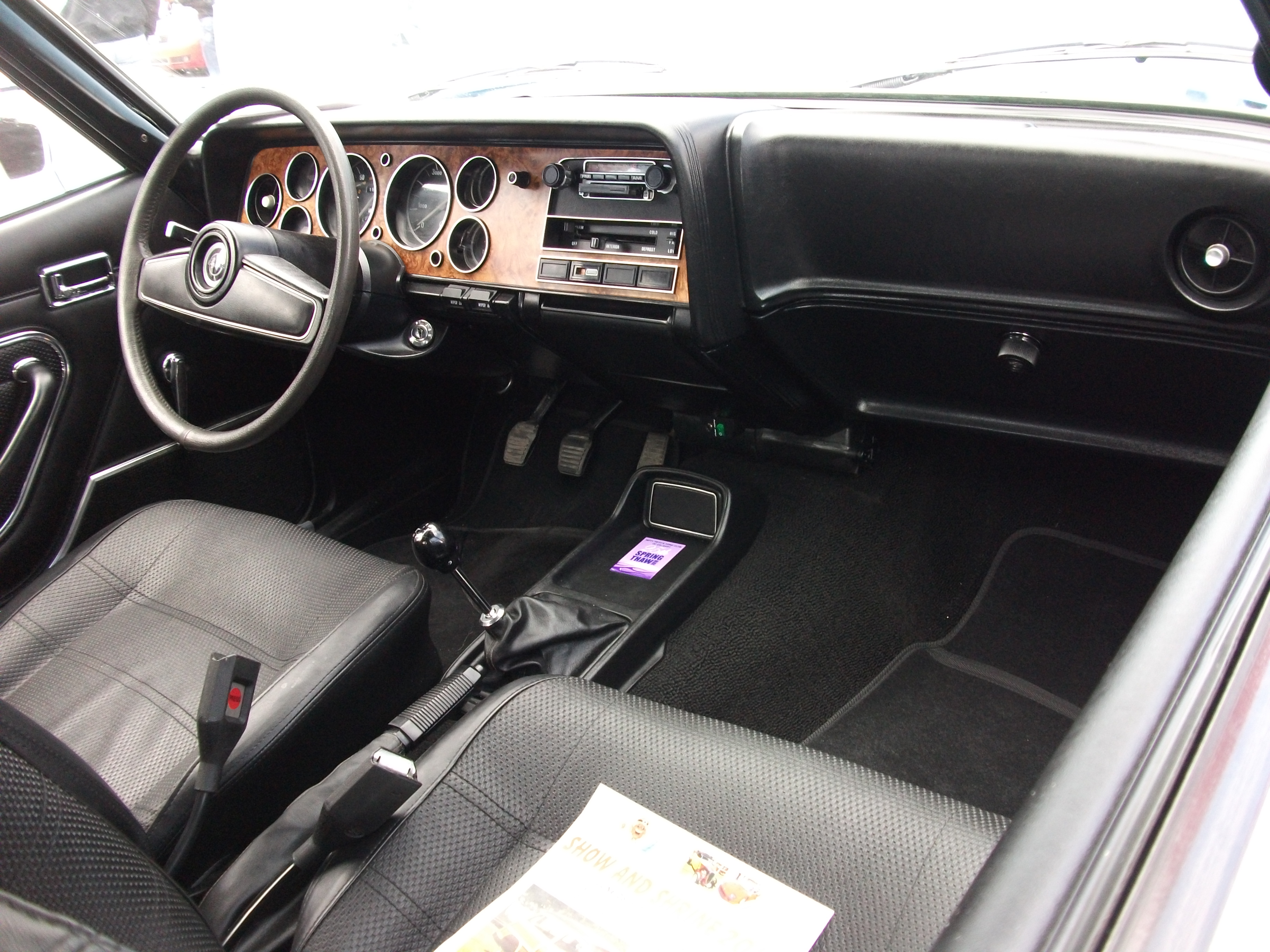
Capri II interior

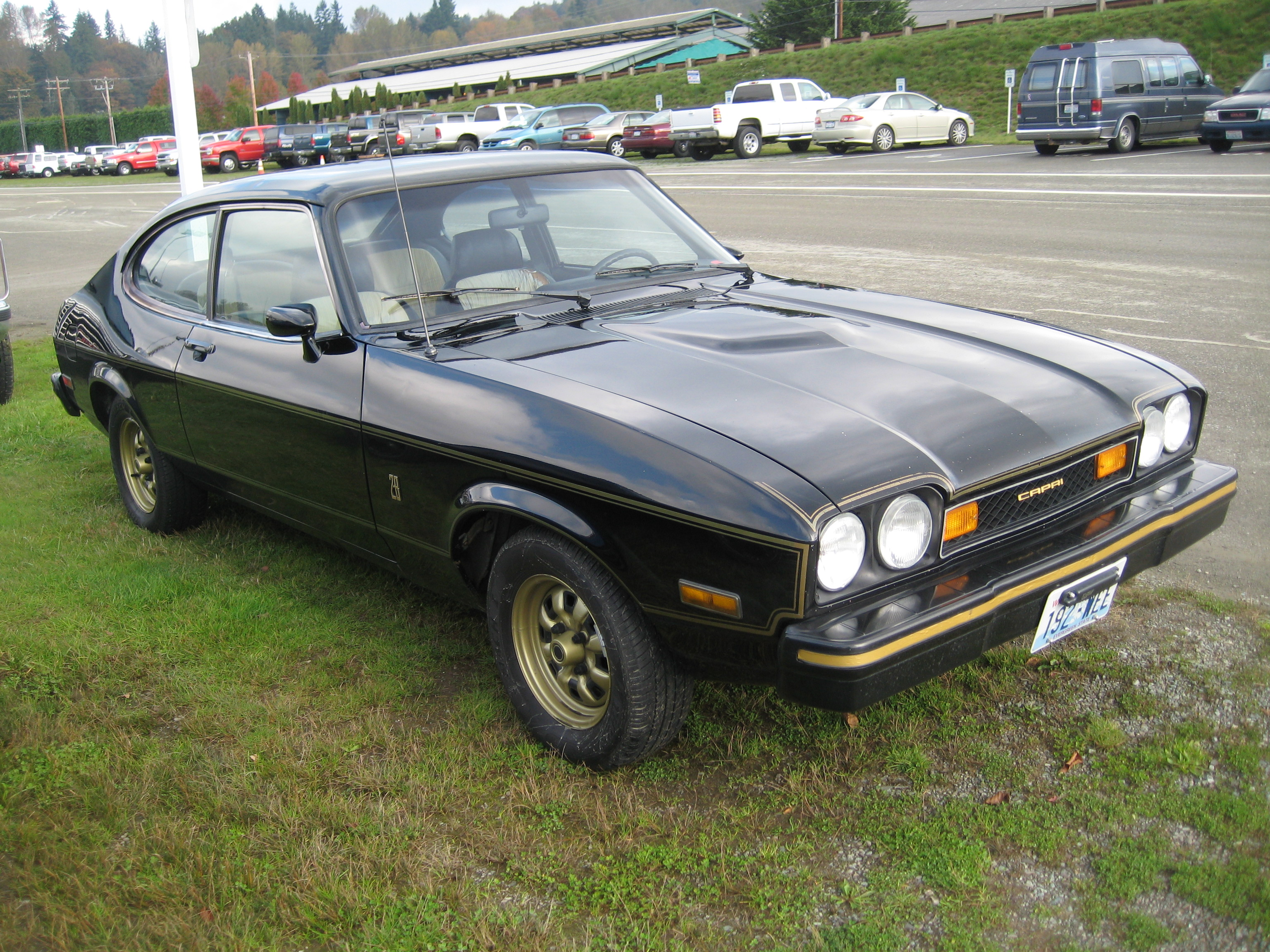
Capri II S

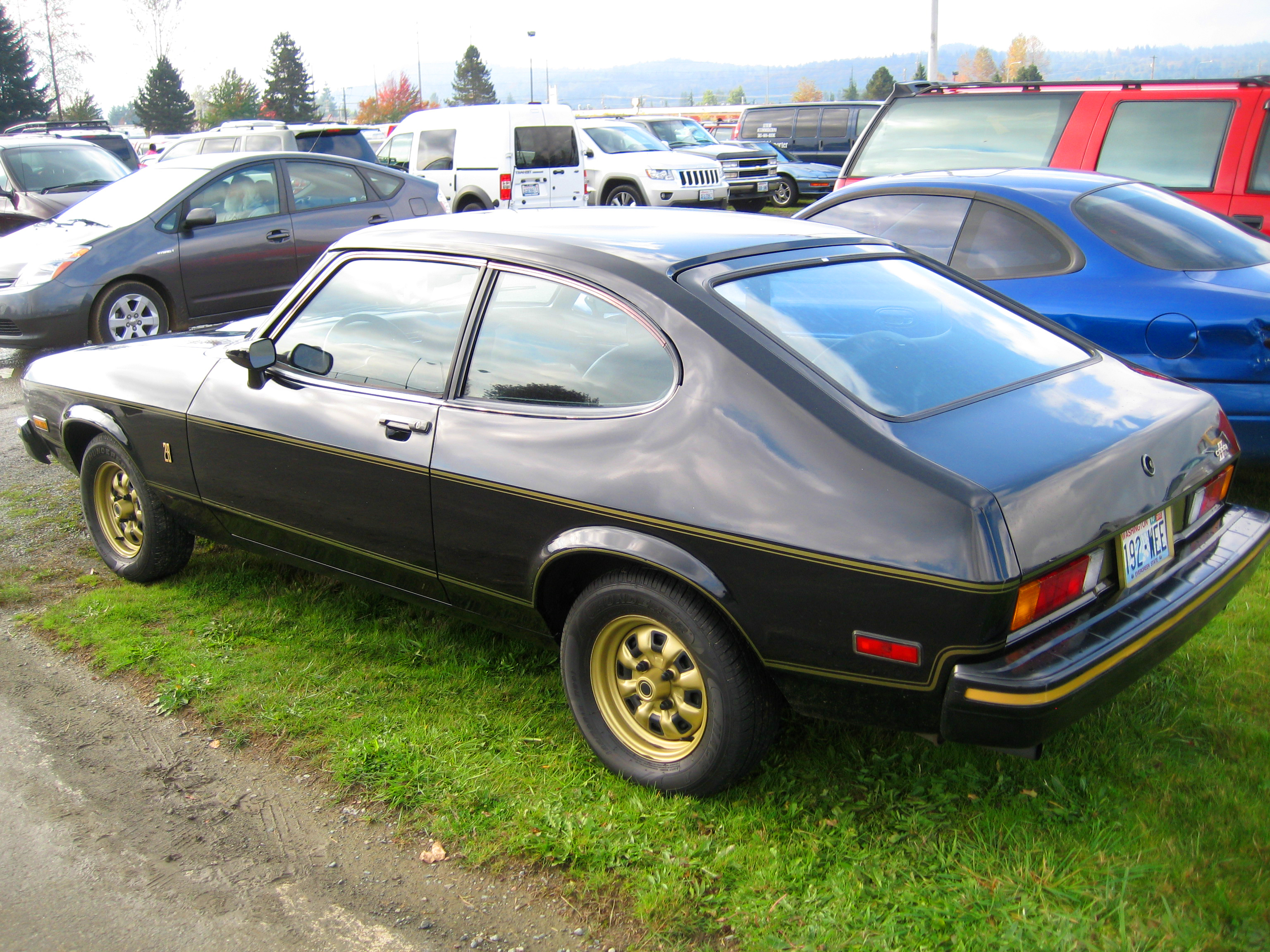
Capri II S

=== Reception ===
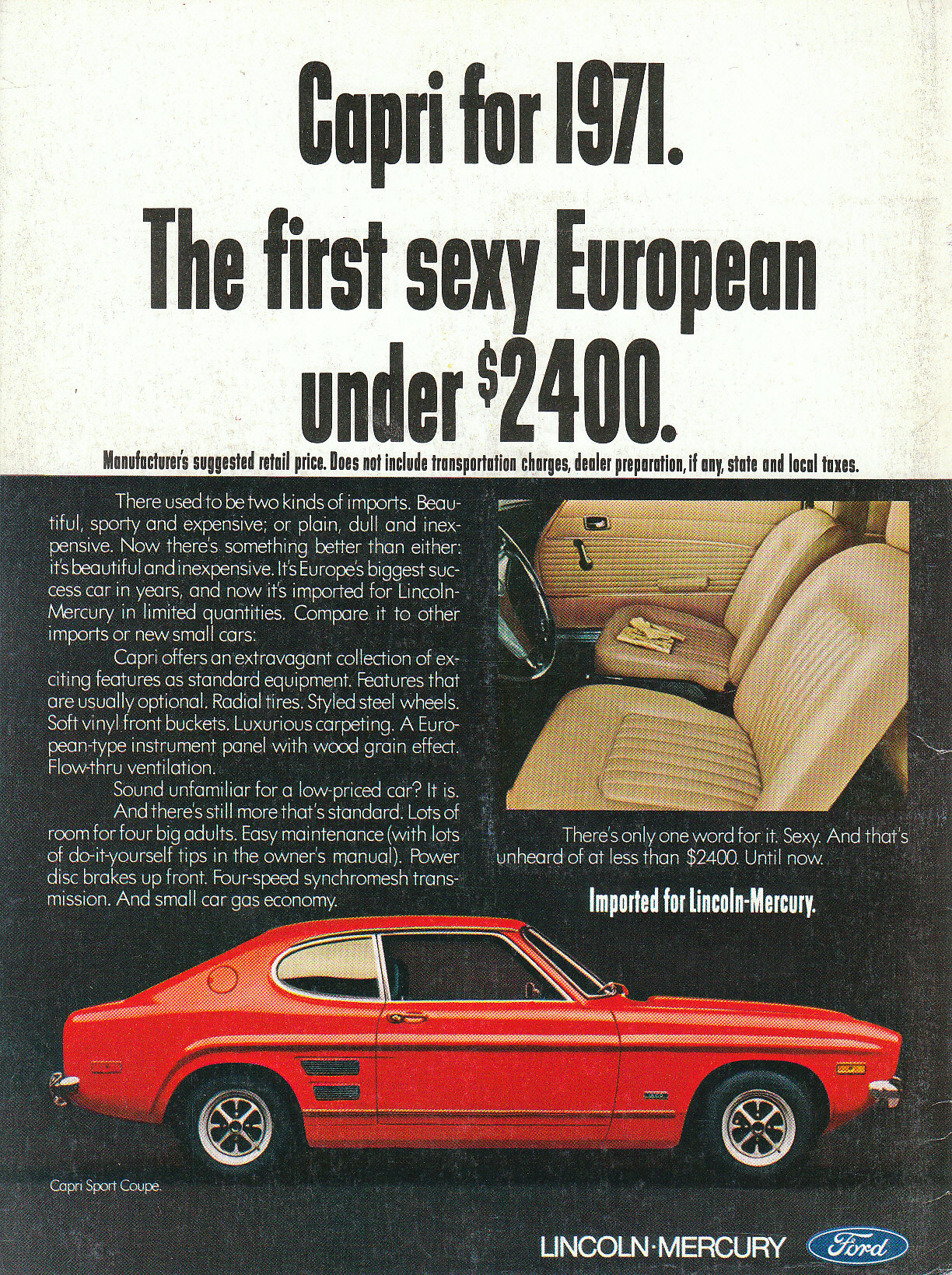
1971 Lincoln-Mercury advertisement

Road & Track magazine on the 1970 Capri 1600: "...But styling and image sells cars, right? And if that's true, then it's our opinion that Lincoln-Mercury has a real winner in the Capri."

R&T on the Capri 2000 in February 1971: "The Capri has a lot to recommend it. It's a solidly built, sporty compact car and (especially with the 2-liter engine) fun to drive."

R&T on the Capri 2600 V6 in March 1972: "...the Capri 2600 V6 is an outstanding car. We'll bet Lincoln-Mercury dealers won't be able to get enough of them to satisfy the demand."

R&T on the Capri 2800 V6: "...the V6 Capri remains a very attractive sporting car. It's solid as a Mercedes, still compact and light in the context of 1974 barrier busters, fast, reasonably economical of fuel, precise-handling, and quick-stopping: its engine and drivetrain are both sporty and refined. It's no wonder Lincoln-Mercury sold nearly 120,000 of them in 1973..."

R&T on the Capri II 2.8 V6: "Once again we can report that the Capri V6 is an attractive, competent, and enjoyable car at a reasonable price. It goes, stops, and handles, it's well built and it has that sturdy, precise European character that makes it something special for Americans and Canadians. On top of all this, it's a more practical car because of its new hatchback body. A quality, European car at a realistic price-what more could one want."

The car features prominently in the 1982 movie "The First Time," with Jennifer Jason-Leigh, where her grandmother gives her hers after she buys a new Corvette and teaches her to drive a stick.

=== Special editions ===
1976–1977 JPS Capri II, Capri II S - Black or white car body with gold striping, "black chrome" trim, gold and black styled steel wheels and gold badging and grille surround.

In Europe, the JPS Capri II celebrated the success of the John Player Special-sponsored Team Lotus Formula 1 team and emulated its black and gold livery. In the US, anti-tobacco advertising laws required a name change to Capri II S. The interior received special seats and door panels: black with gold cloth inserts.

== Second generation (1979–1986) ==
Second generation
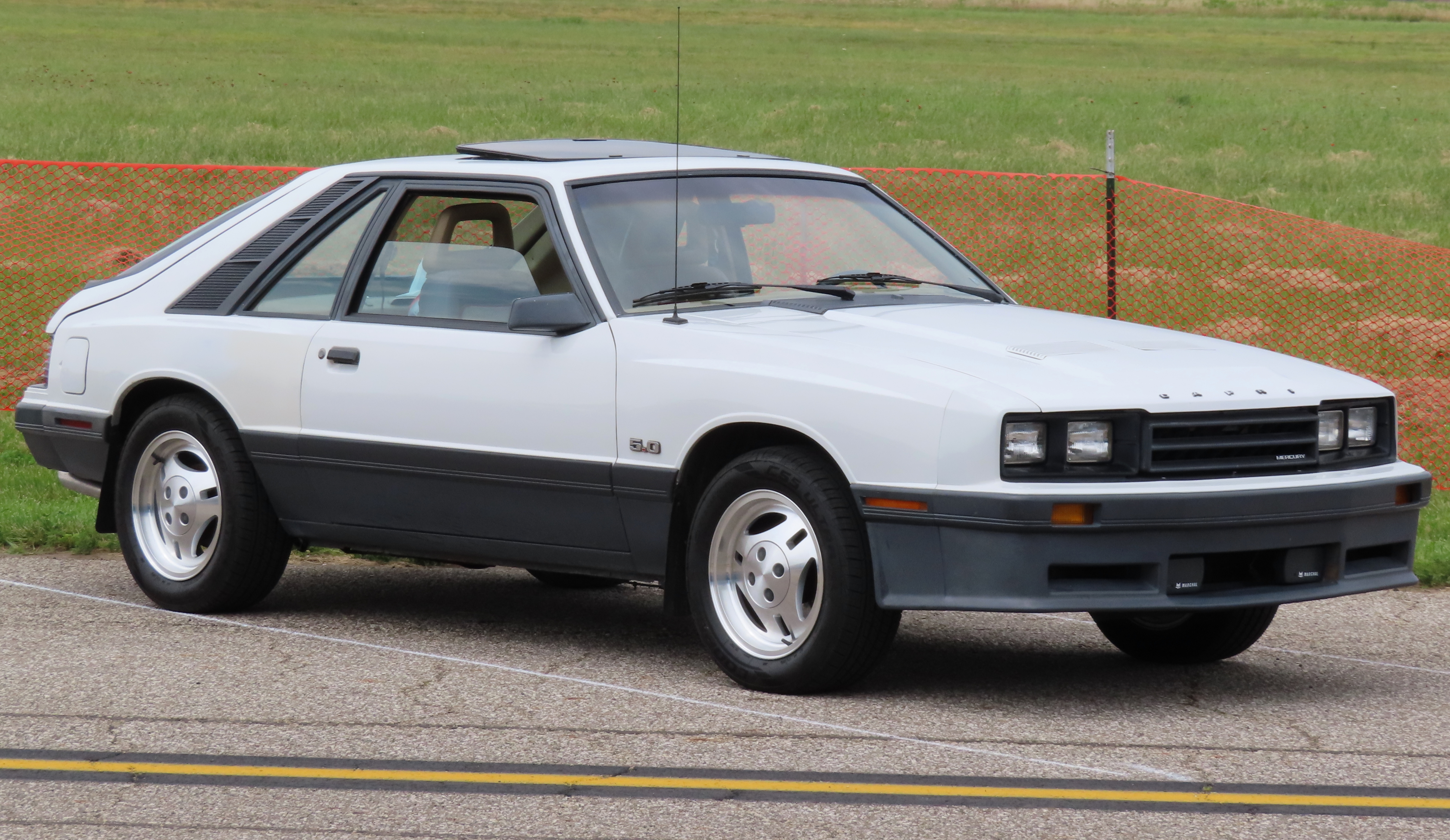
- 1985 Mercury Capri GS

Overview
- Also called: Ford Mustang (1979–1993)
- Production: 1979–1986
- Assembly: United States: Dearborn, Michigan; United States: San Jose, California (1979–1981 only)

Body and chassis
- Body style: 2-door hatchback
- Layout: FR layout
- Platform: Ford Fox platform
- Related: Mercury Zephyr; Ford Mustang; Ford Mustang SVO; Ford Fairmont; Ford Durango

Powertrain
- Engine: 2.3 L OHC I4; 2.3 L OHC (turbo); 2.8 L OHV V6; 3.3 L OHV I6; 3.8 L OHV V6; 4.2 L OHV 2-bbl. V8; 5.0 HO 2-bbl V8; 5.0 HO 4-bbl V8; 5.0 HO EFI V8
- Transmission: 4- or 5-speed manual; 3- or 4-speed automatic

Dimensions
- Wheelbase: 100.5 in (2,553 mm)

For the 1979 model year, a second generation of the Capri was introduced. As part of several changes over its predecessor, the Capri was officially part of the Mercury model line as Lincoln-Mercury ended captive imports of the Ford Capri in favor of creating a Mercury counterpart of the 1979 Ford Mustang. Sharing the Fox platform with the Mustang, the 1979 Mercury Capri marked the first Mercury "pony car" since the 1970 Mercury Cougar.

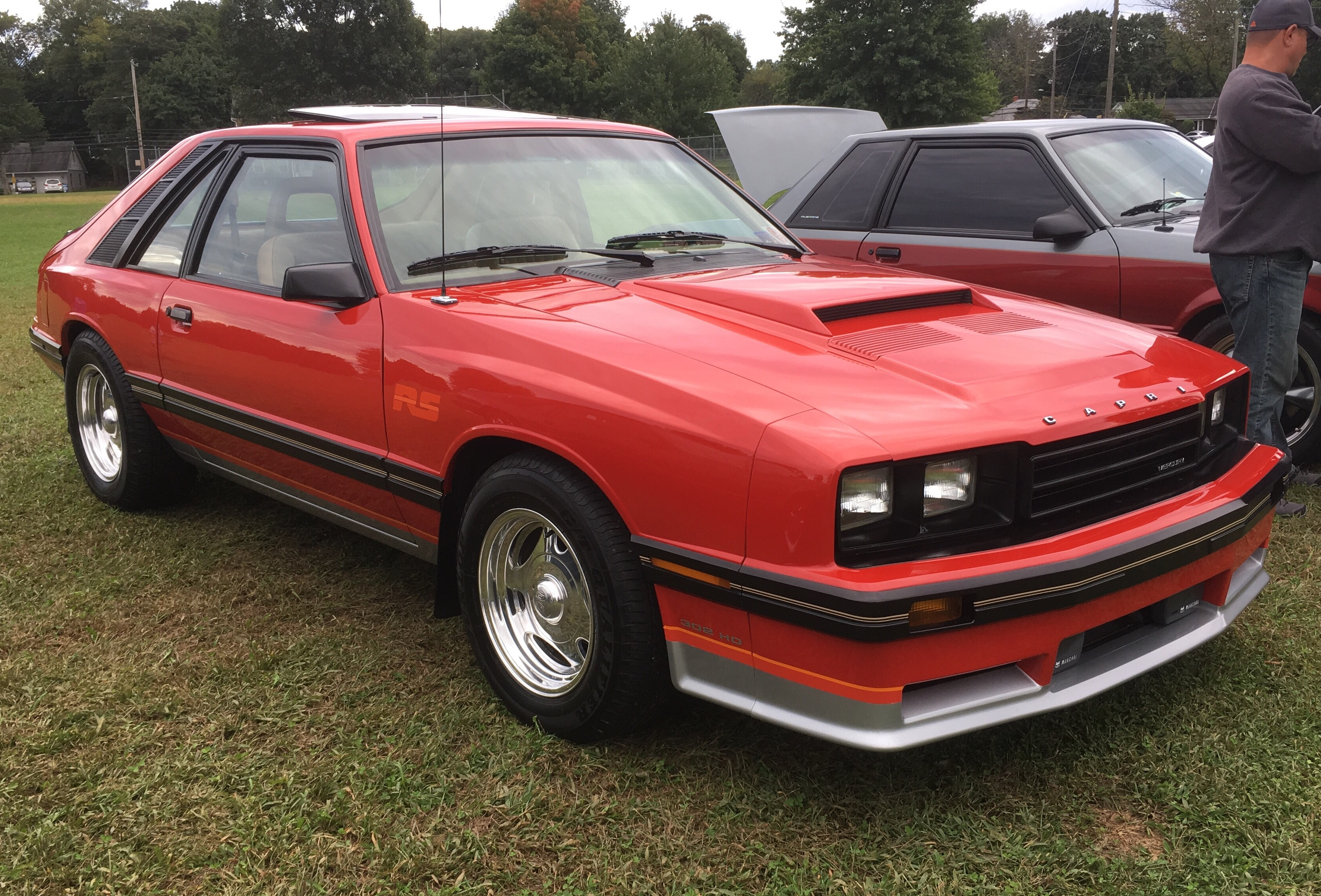
1984 Mercury Capri RS

While visually similar to the Mustang, the second-generation Capri was offered solely in the three-door hatchback configuration. The Capri was styled with its own front fascia, a vertically mounted grille, and dark-tinted tail light with horizontally ribbed lenses. In place of the widely flared wheel openings of the Mustang, the Capri was styled with slightly flared wheel openings and widened front and rear fenders. For 1983, the Capri received a redesign of the rear hatchback, distinguished with a large compound-curve "bubble-back" rear window. Along with that revision came newly styled tail lights, rear bumper cover and front end grille. For 1984, the front fascia of the Capri RS was fitted with a front air dam with fog lamps similar to the one used on Mustang Cobras and GTs from 1980 to 1982, with the same exterior continuing through 1986. The 1986 Capri received the federally mandated high mounted center brake lamp.

Along with the base-trim Capri, Mercury offered the Capri Ghia (shared with the Mustang), Capri L, Capri GS, Capri RS, and Capri Turbo RS. The Capri RS/Turbo RS was believed to be the equivalent of the GT and in most instances it was. However early RS Capris could have the base 4 cylinder or even 6 cylinder option. During its production, the second-generation Capri maintained powertrain commonality with the Ford Mustang, with inline-four, inline-6, V6, and V8 engines offered during its production; the only Mustang model with no Capri equivalent was the Mustang SVO.

The second-generation Capri was produced through the 1986 model year. For 1987, while the Mustang underwent a mid-cycle update (lasting to 1993), Mercury withdrew the Capri, focusing on the Cougar XR7 as its two-door performance vehicle; not offering another sports coupe until the FWD Cougar in 1999.

=== Special editions ===
1981–1983 Black Magic - Black cars with gold striping, gold metric TRX wheels and a gold cat's head on each side of the front valance. The interior received special black seats with sand-colored inserts (code YA), with Recaro seating optional in 1982 (code TA) and Sport Performance seating optional in 1983 (code HA). In the 1981 and 1982 models years the Black Magic option could be ordered with polar white (code 9D) paint but otherwise had the same exterior appointments as the black cars (gold striping, gold TRX wheels, and gold cat's heads). Magazine ads for the 9D Black Magic used the term "white lightning" but the name of the package was still Black Magic. The 1983 model is extremely rare and the only Black Magic to receive the compound rear window.

1983 Crimson Cat - Bright red (code 27) paint with gold striping and Cougar XR-7 TRX wheels set this car apart. Crimson Cat received black sport performance seating with red inserts (code KA).

1984 Charcoal Turbo RS - A Capri RS Turbo that was only available in charcoal upper-silver lower exterior paint with light grey striped rub moldings, Garrett 60 trim turbocharger, enhanced multi-port EFI four-cylinder engine, Michelin TRX package, 5.0 HO Sway bars, 3.45:1 limited-slip rear axle, hood scoop, and orange and red lettering and striping. Sun- and T-top roofs were optional.

1985 Mercury Motorsport Capri- Built as pace car replicas to commemorate the 1985 Detroit Grand Prix & MotorCity 100. These were also cosmetically modified by American Sunroof Company for Mercury and are highly sought after for their low production of less than 50 cars and availability in only Michigan & Ohio.

=== Gallery ===
1979–1986 Mercury Capri

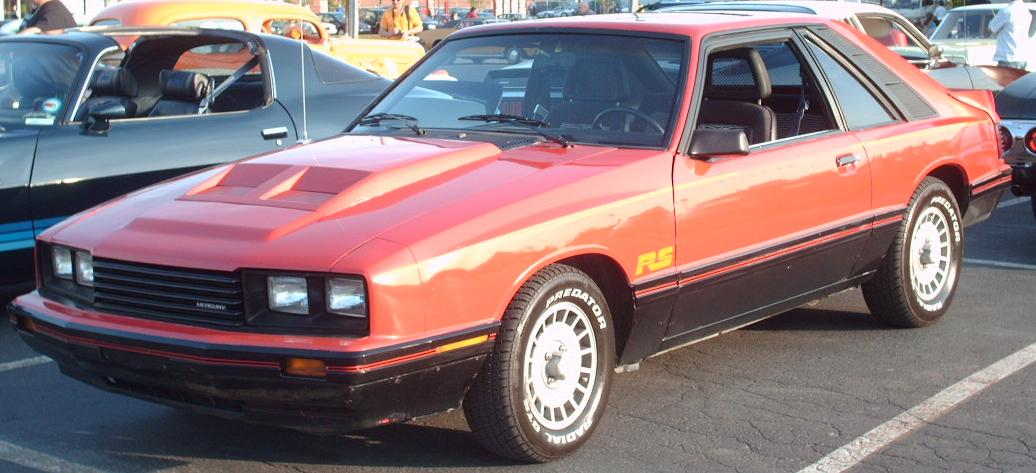
1979–1982 Mercury Capri RS

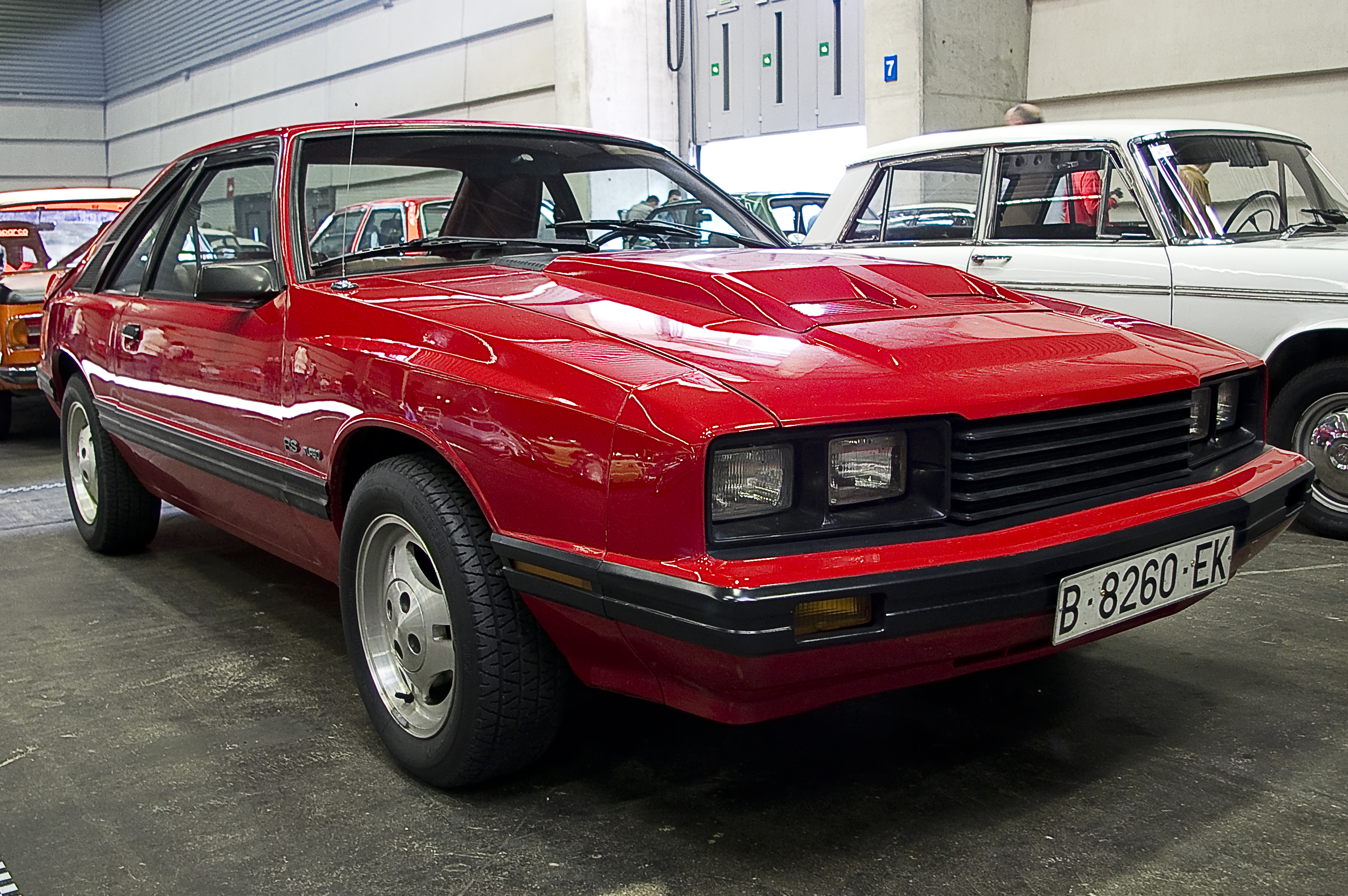
1980 Mercury Capri RS Turbo

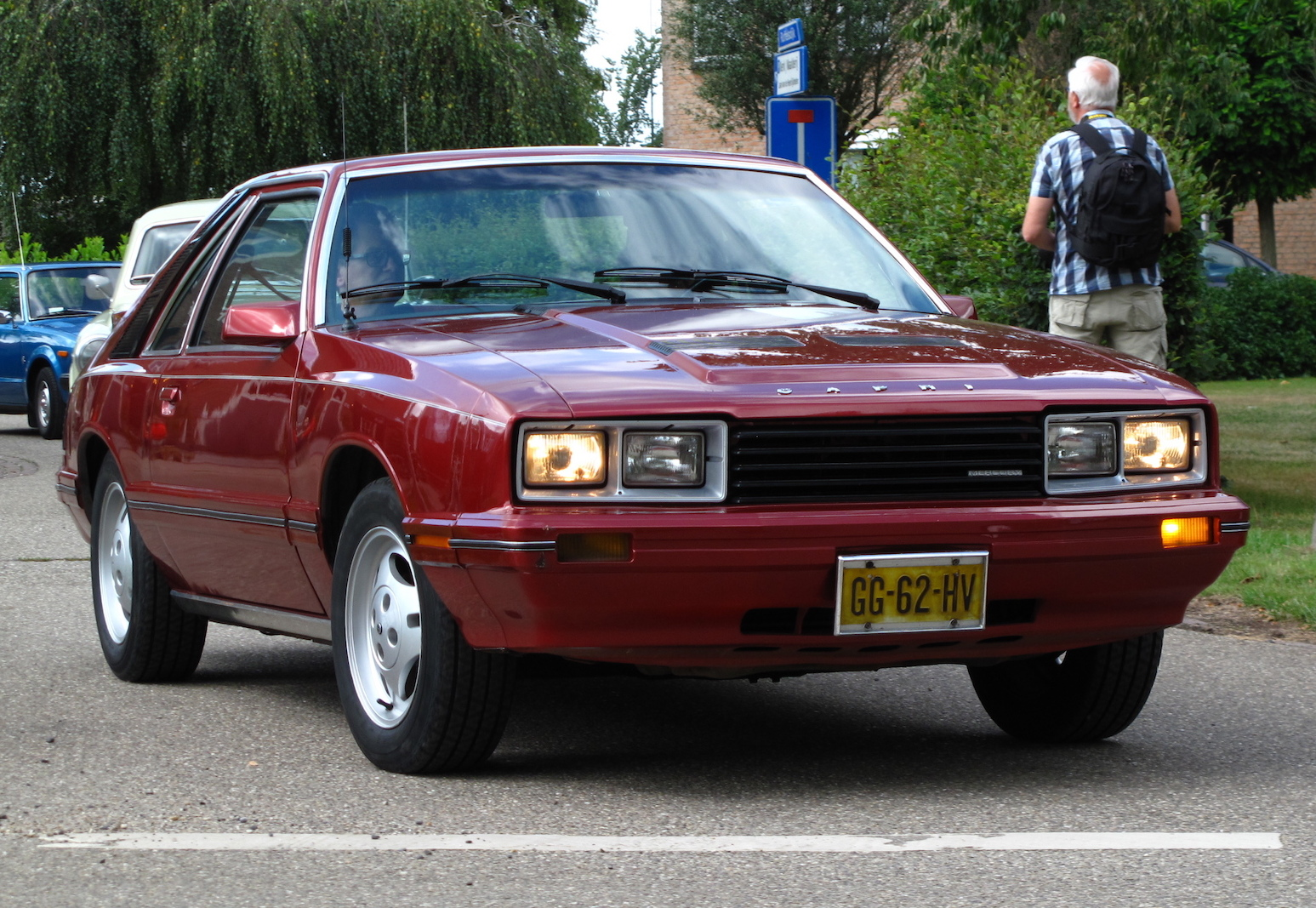
1980 Mercury Capri V6 Ghia

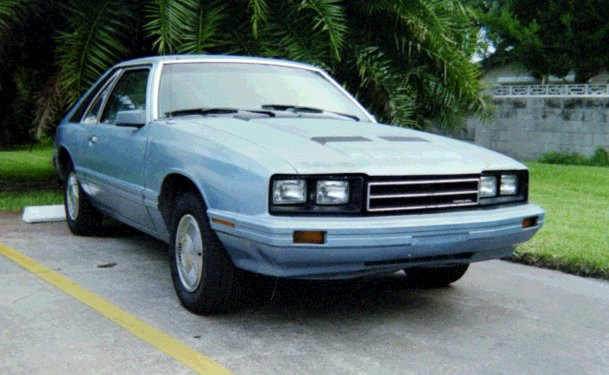
1983 Mercury Capri (base trim)

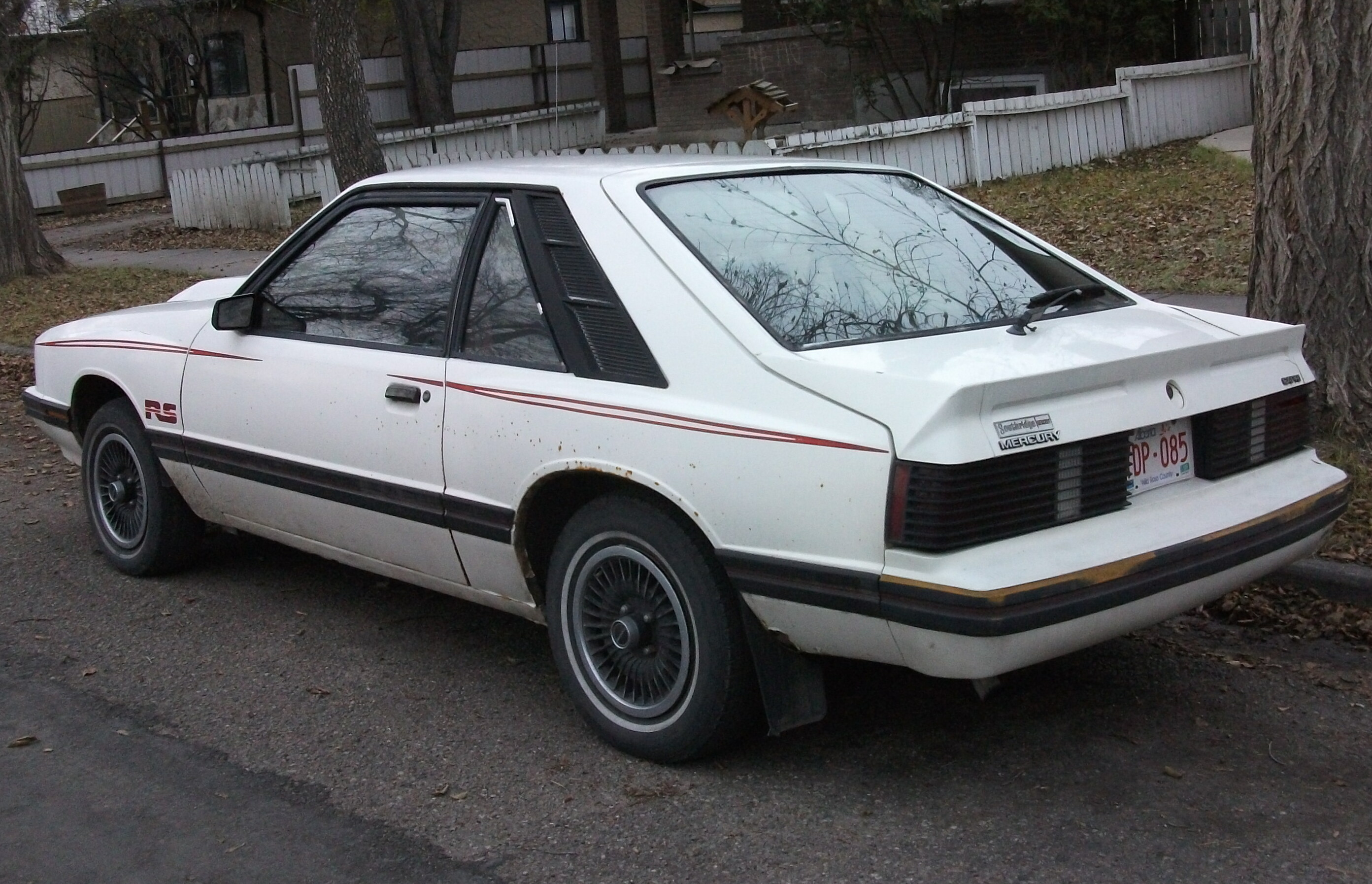
1979–1982 Mercury Capri RS

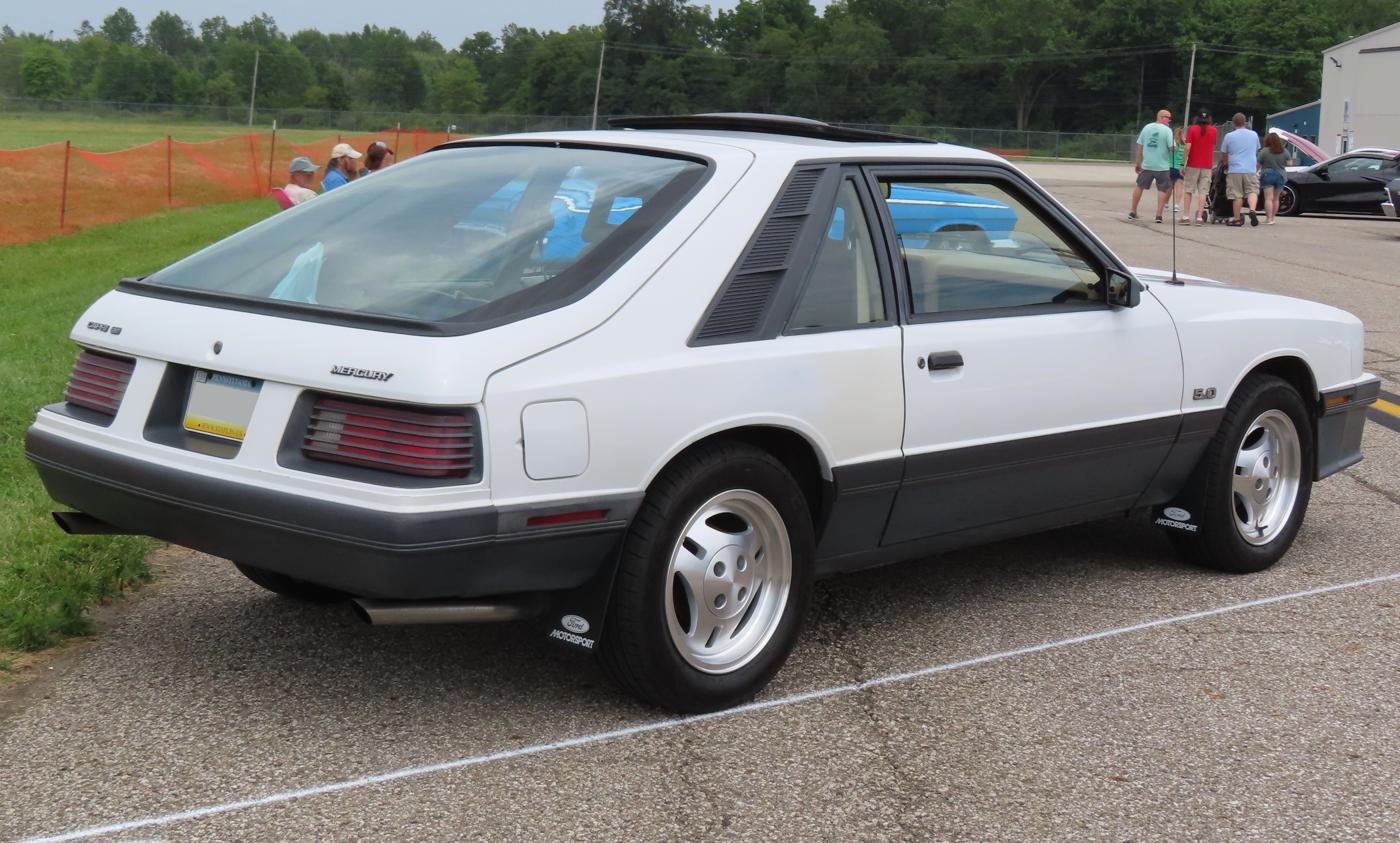
1985 Mercury Capri GS 5.0 L rear view, showing the distinctive hatch design

=== Motorsport ===
This particular generation was successful in the Trans Am Series, winning the championship from 1984 to 1985 with an aftermarket V8 engine. The Mercury Capri 5.0 L was the car used by the Jack Roush team with Wally Dallenbach Jr. driving to win the 1985 Sports Car Club of America (SCCA) Trans AM championship.

=== Variants ===
==== ASC McLaren (1984–1986) ====
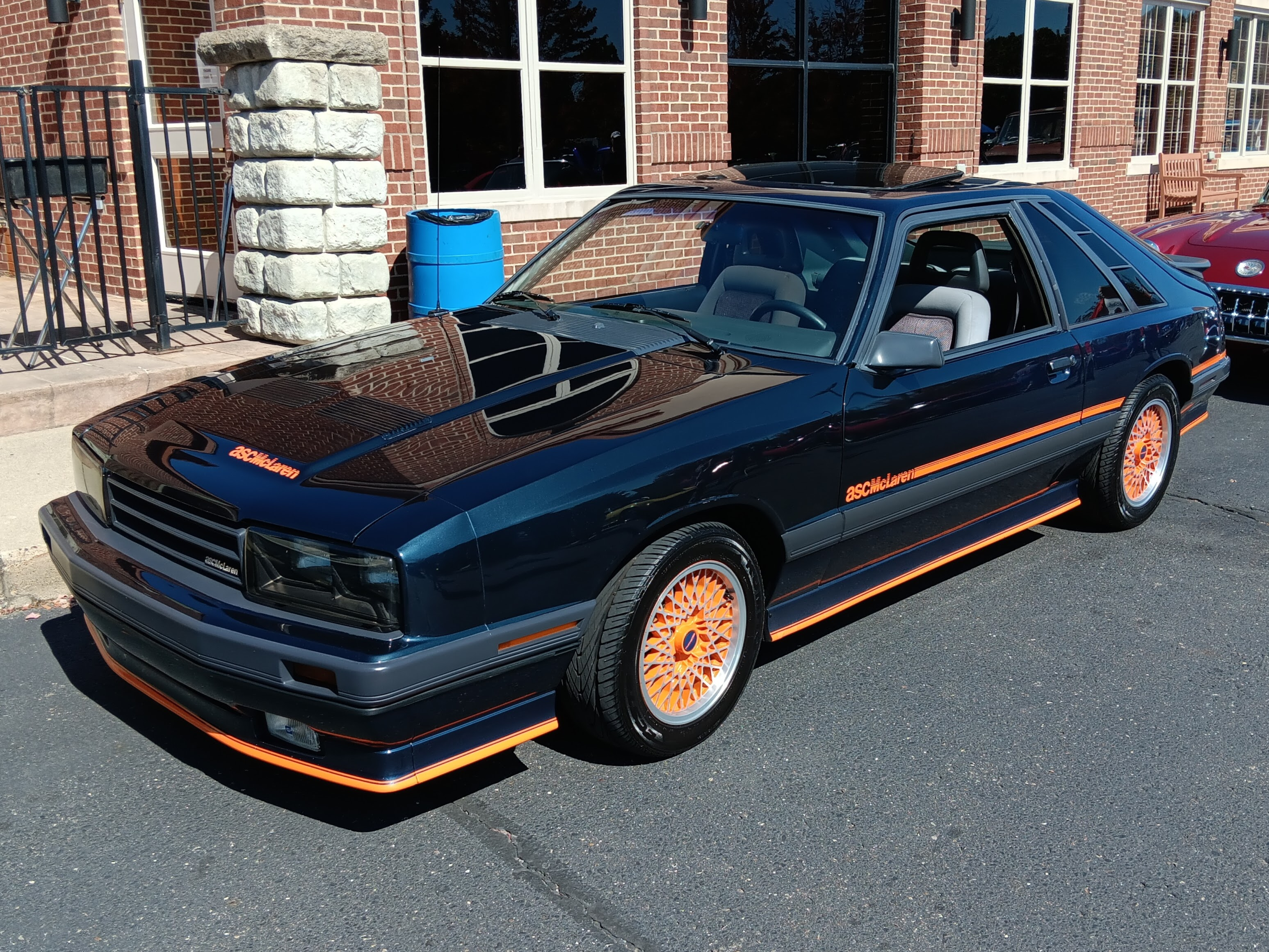
1985 Mercury Capri ASC McLaren

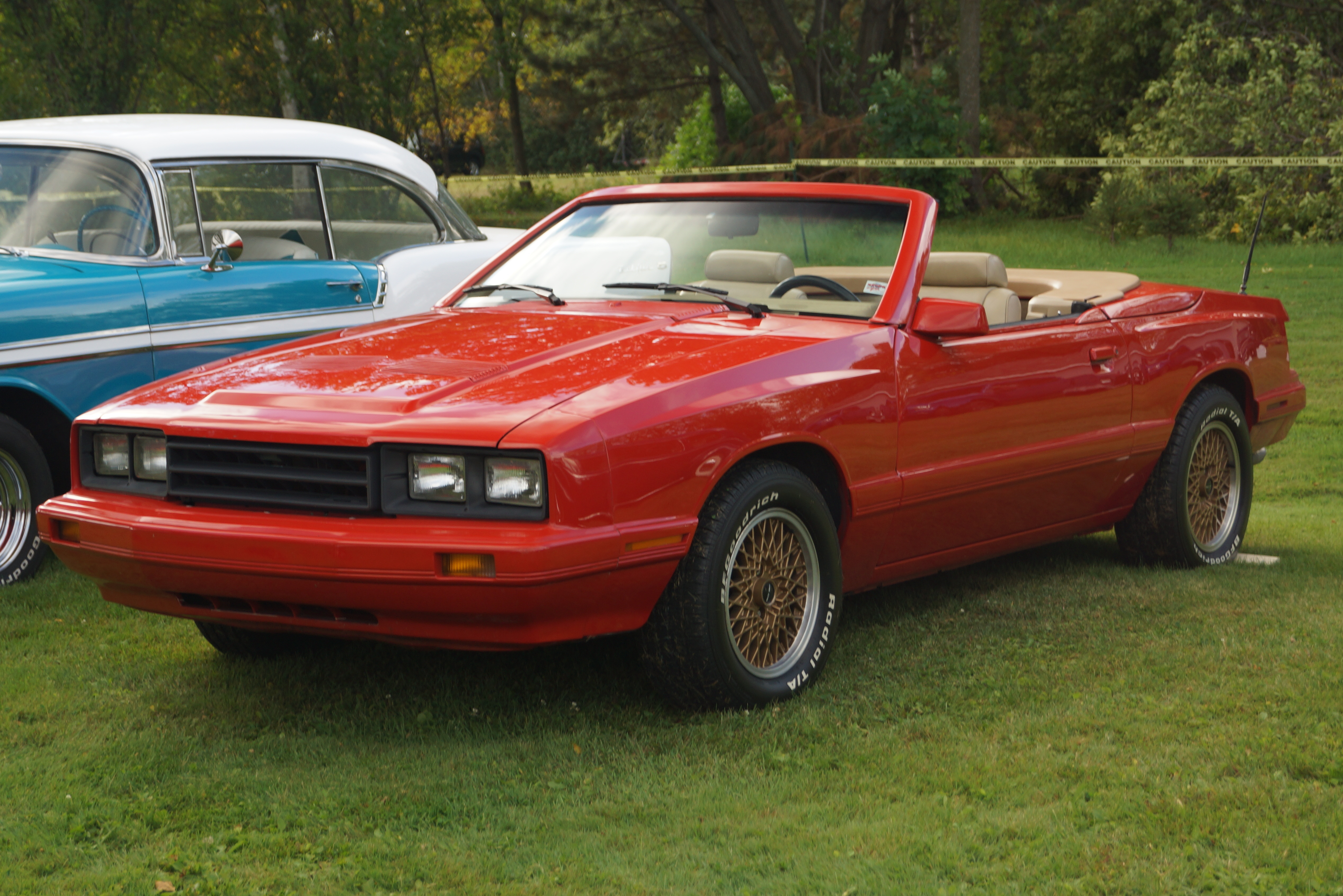
1986 Mercury Capri ASC McLaren 5.0 SC Convertible

The ASC McLaren brand was a joint specialty vehicle program produced from 1984 to 1990 by the American Sunroof Company (ASC), McLaren Performance Technologies (the U.S. engine and racing arm founded by Bruce McLaren), and engineer Peter Muscat. Positioned as a luxury, high-performance grand tourer, the brand converted Ford’s Fox-body platform into hand-built, European-style two-seater roadsters and tuned sport coupes.

The brand was conceived when engineer Peter Muscat designed a custom two-seat convertible for his wife—a Ford Motor Company employee who was barred from parking her personal Mercedes-Benz SL in the company lot. Muscat engineered a custom manual soft-top that folded flat beneath a flush-fitting fiberglass tonneau cover. Ford declined to build the concept in-house due to its existing factory Mustang convertible, but executives redirected Muscat to ASC for coachbuilding and McLaren for performance engineering. Mercury’s Capri was chosen as the launch platform to revitalize the model's sluggish sales.

- 1982 Jubbu Prototype: Created by Muscat and Jubbu Designers, this initial proof-of-concept modified a Fox-body coupe into a low-slung roadster. It established the program's signature custom leather seating, headrest-mounted audio speakers, and flat-deck top storage.
- 1983 Engineering Mule: Built to evaluate structural integrity and aerodynamic changes, this prototype established the signature 20-degree windshield rake, shortened glass frame, and heavy underbody subframe bracing needed for open-top conversion.

Completed donor cars were shipped from Ford assembly lines to ASC facilities. Mechanics removed the factory roofs, added structural box-section subframe connectors to retain torsional rigidity, installed custom fiberglass rear body panels, and angled the windshield glass back two degrees. McLaren Performance Technologies re-engineered the suspension with tuned springs, Tokico gas shocks, heavy-duty sway bars, and custom BBS-style mesh wheels. Interiors featured leather Recaro sport seats, real wood interior accents, high-end sound systems, and built-in radar detectors.

In the mid-1980s, a severe administrative dispute led an outgoing employee to destroy and burn a massive collection of factory build records. This erased official VIN logs, paint code matrices, and option lists for 1984 and 1985 models, forcing modern enthusiast registries to manually reconstruct early vehicle histories.

Production shifted from the Capri to the Ford Mustang GT in 1987 before licensing and royalty disputes between Muscat and ASC permanently ended the partnership after 1990.

Platform	Model Years	Configuration	Units Produced
Mercury Capri	1984–1986	Coupe (5.0 SC) & Roadster	874
Ford Mustang	1987–1990	Two-Seat Roadster	1,804
Total	1984–1990		2,678

===== Powertrain upgrades =====
ASC McLaren coupes were fitted with BFGoodrich Comp T/A radials. The 225/50/15 low profile size of these tires (as opposed to the standard 5.0 L Capri's 225/60/15) raised the ASC/McLaren Coupe's effective gear ratio from 3.08:1 to approximately 3.35:1.

These were the quickest cars produced by Ford in 1985 and 1986 with zero to sixty times well under six seconds and quarter-mile times in the mid-13 second range.

==== Ford Mustang (Mexico, 1981–1984) ====
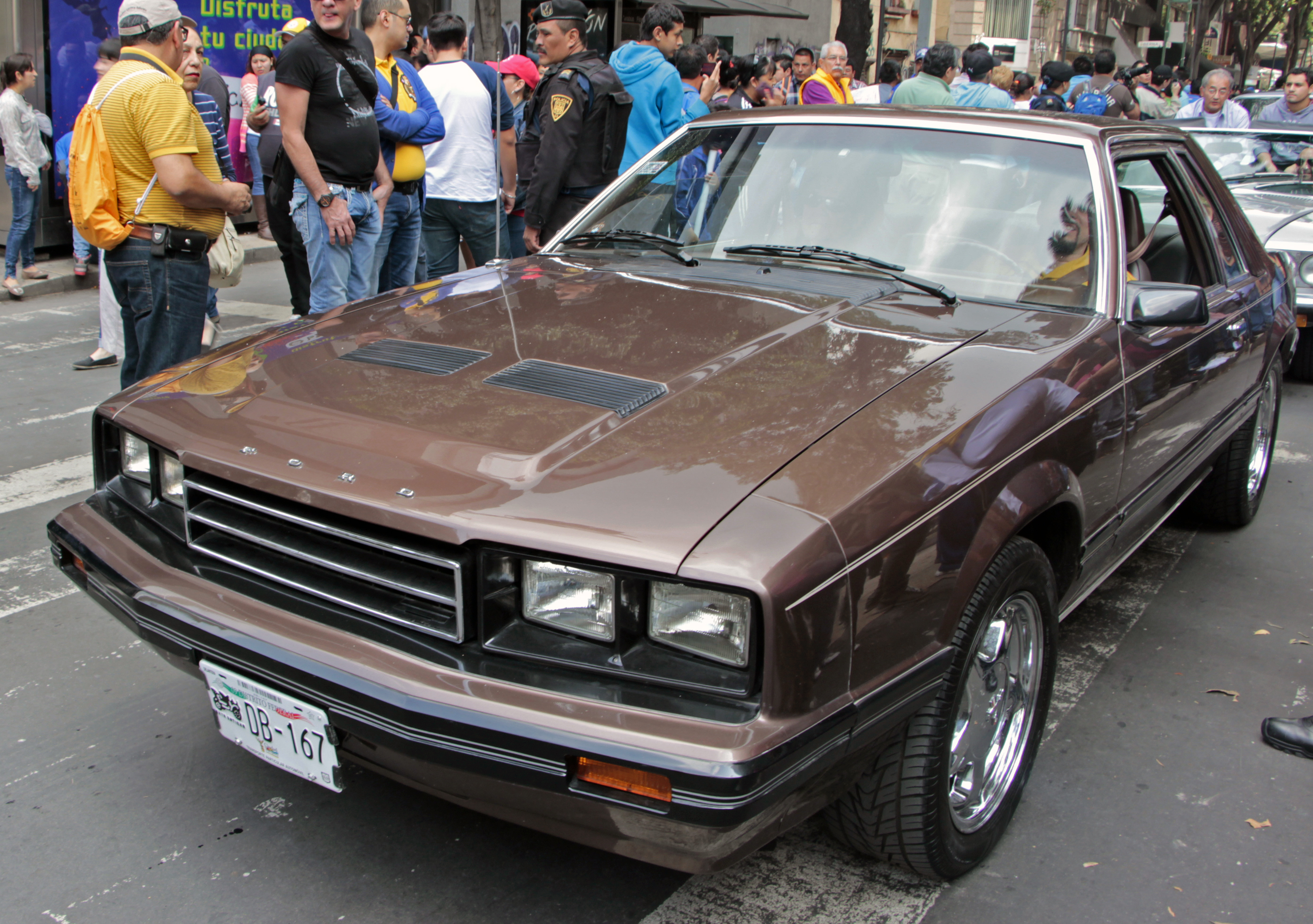
Ford Mustang coupé, Mexican market version

The third-generation Ford Mustang was manufactured in the Ford Cuautitlán Izcalli plant (located outside Mexico City) from 1979 to 1984. Produced for sale in Mexico, the vehicles were produced in both hatchback and notchback coupe body configurations.

From 1981 to 1984, Cuautitlán Assembly produced the Mustang using components from both the Mustang and Mercury Capri. Along with the taillights of the Capri, the Mustangs were produced using the front fascia of the Capri (with Ford badging) from 1982 to 1983. From 1983 to 1984, the facility produced the Mustang hatchback with front and rear fenders of the Capri, along with its "bubble-back" rear hatch.

== Third generation (1991–1994) ==
Third generation
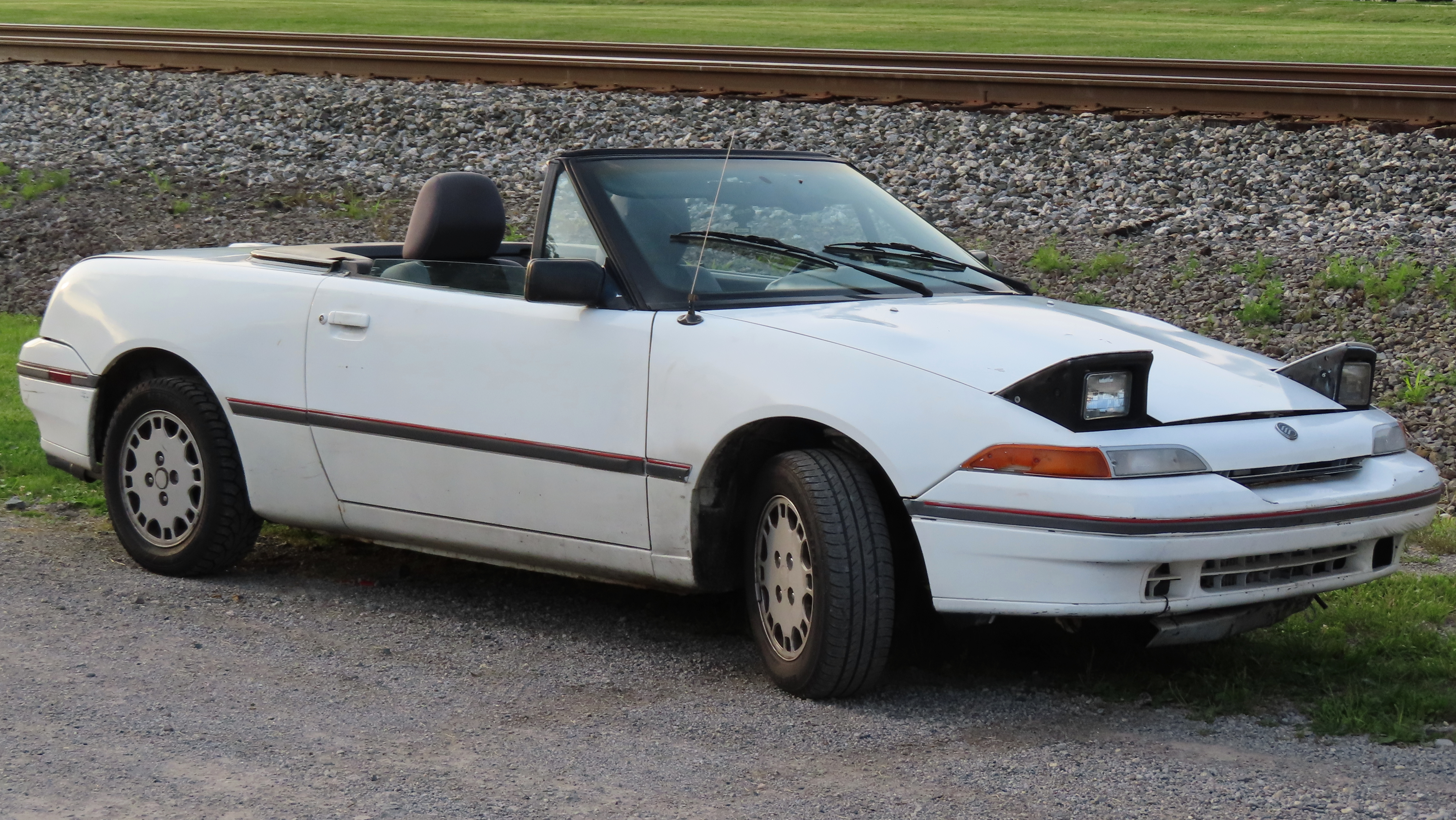
- 1991 Mercury Capri

Overview
- Also called: Ford Capri
- Production: 1991–1994
- Assembly: Australia: Melbourne, Victoria (Broadmeadows)

Body and chassis
- Body style: 2-door roadster
- Layout: FF layout
- Related: Mazda 323

Powertrain
- Engine: 1.6 L B6D I4; 1.6 L Turbo B6T I4
- Transmission: 4-speed automatic; 5-speed manual

Dimensions
- Wheelbase: 94.7 in (2,405 mm)
- Length: 1993–1994: 167.1 in (4,244 mm); 1991–1992: 166.1 in (4,219 mm)
- Width: 64.6 in (1,641 mm)
- Height: 1991–1992: 50.2 in (1,275 mm); 1993–1994 Base: 50.4 in (1,280 mm); 1993–94 XR2: 49.9 in (1,267 mm)

For the 1991 model year, the Mercury Capri made its return to the Mercury division after a five-year hiatus. To give Lincoln-Mercury a competitor for the Mazda MX-5 Miata and Toyota MR2, the Capri was released as a two-door roadster. In a fashion similar to the first-generation Mercury Capri, the third-generation version is a captive import; produced by Ford of Australia alongside its Ford Capri counterpart and the Ford Falcon, the Mercury Capri was intended for American exports. For the first time since 1978, the Mercury Capri was the first Mercury without any Ford counterpart in North America.

Derived from the Australian Ford Laser (sold in the United States as the first-generation Mercury Tracer), the Ford Capri also shares drivetrain commonality with the Mazda 323. To adapt the Capri for United States sale, Ford of Australia made several changes over the Australian-market Capri. Along with the addition of a driver-side airbag in order to meet passive restraint requirements (not required in Australia at the time), the dashboard was changed to non-metric gauges; Mercury Capris are fitted with body-color bumpers.

While both two-door convertibles similar in size and price, the Mercury Capri and Mazda MX-5 featured major departures in powertrain and interior configurations, with the Capri adopting a front-wheel-drive powertrain. While the MX-5 was strictly a two-seat vehicle, the Capri was a 2+2, with (small) rear seats. Along with folding back seats (allowing access to the trunk), the Capri also offered the option of a removable hardtop (similar to the MX-5).

During its entire production, the Mercury Capri was sold under two trim levels: base trim and XR2, distinguished largely by the powertrain. The base trim was equipped with a 100 hp Mazda 1.6 L DOHC inline-4; the XR2 was equipped with a turbocharged version of the 1.6 L engine, rated at 132 hp. A five-speed manual transmission was standard for both trims, with a four-speed automatic available on base-trim Capris. From 1991 to 1993, the Capri was sold with minimal revisions. The XR2 received standard 3-spoke 15" alloy wheels for 1992, and for 1994, the Capri received new tail lights, bumpers, and wheel designs.

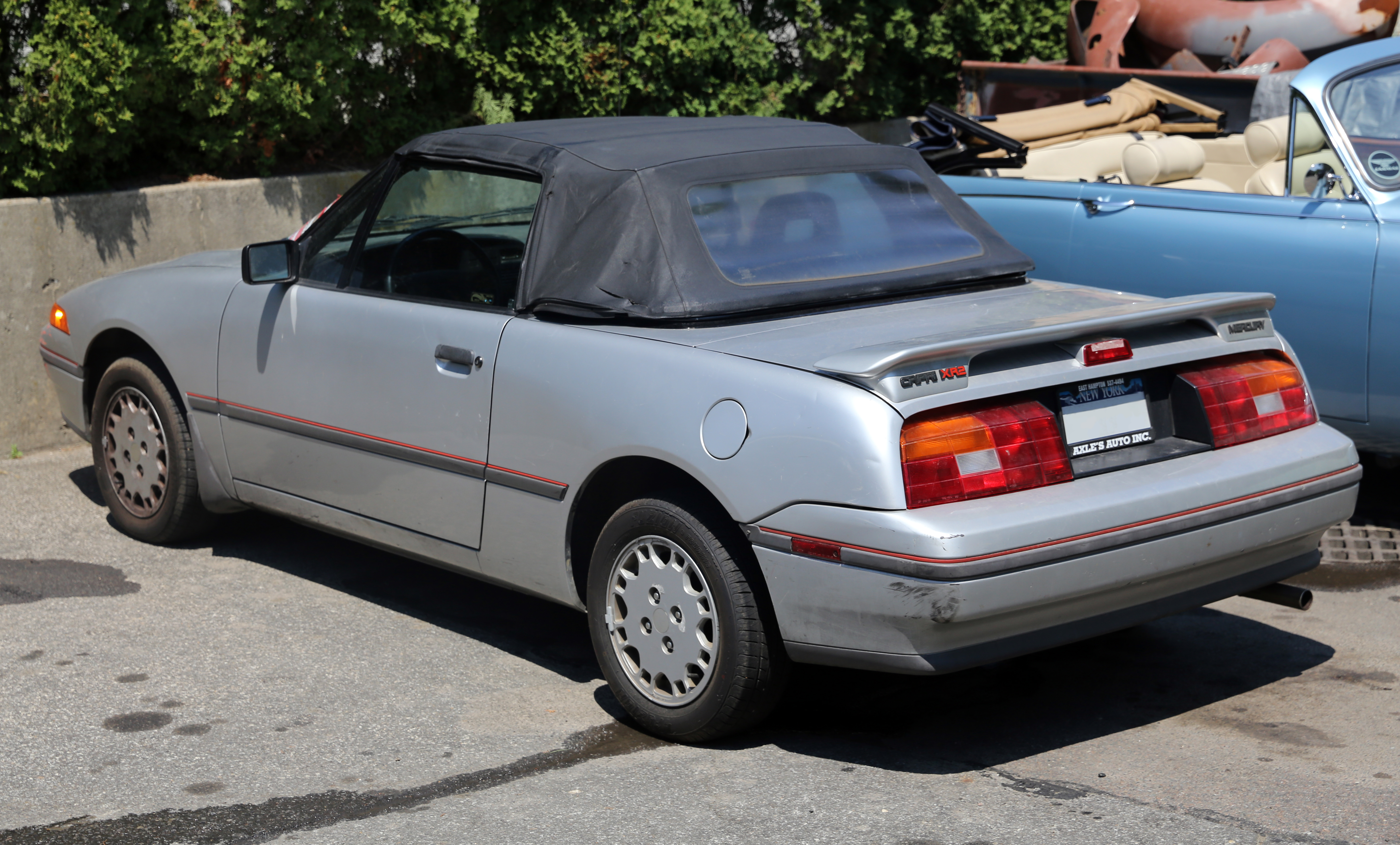
1991 Mercury Capri XR2, rear view

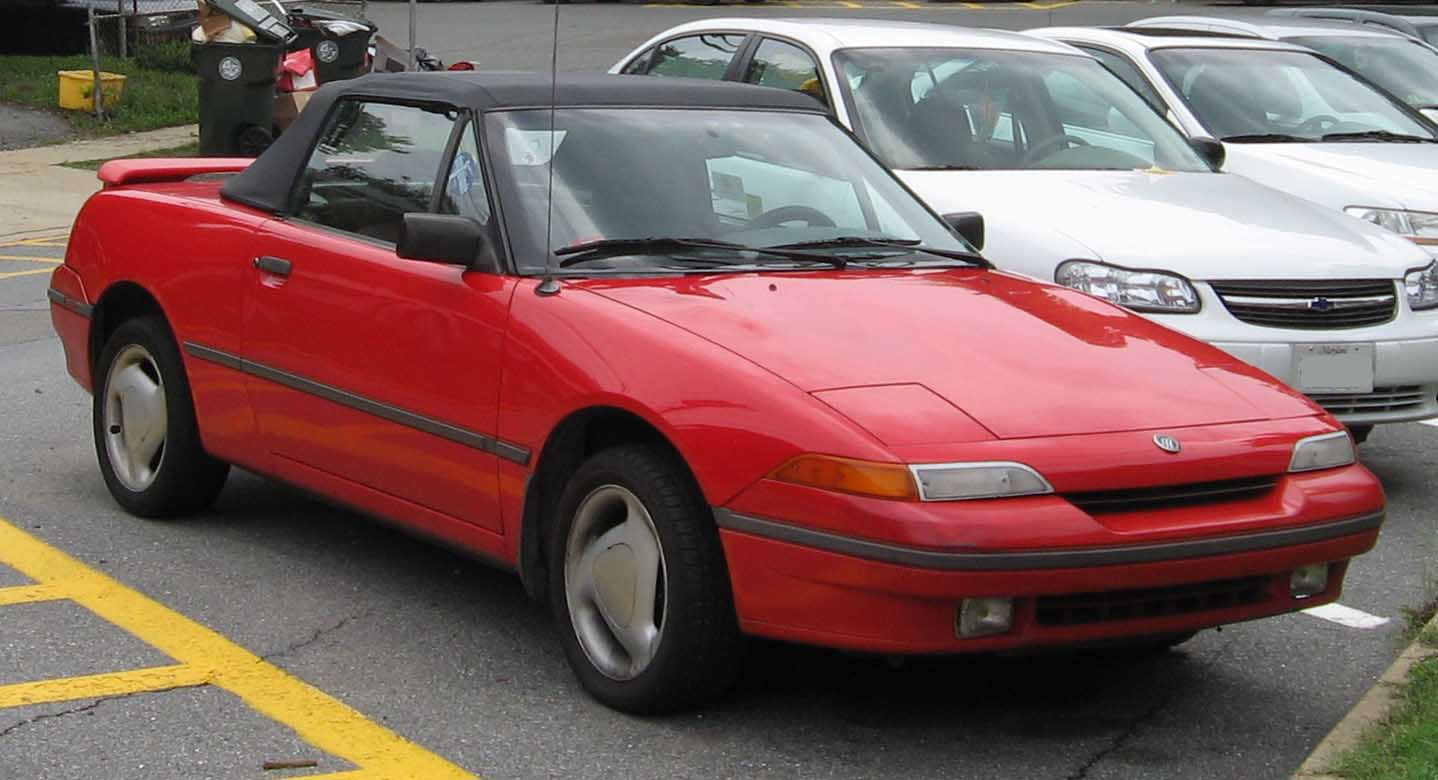
1992–1993 Mercury Capri XR2

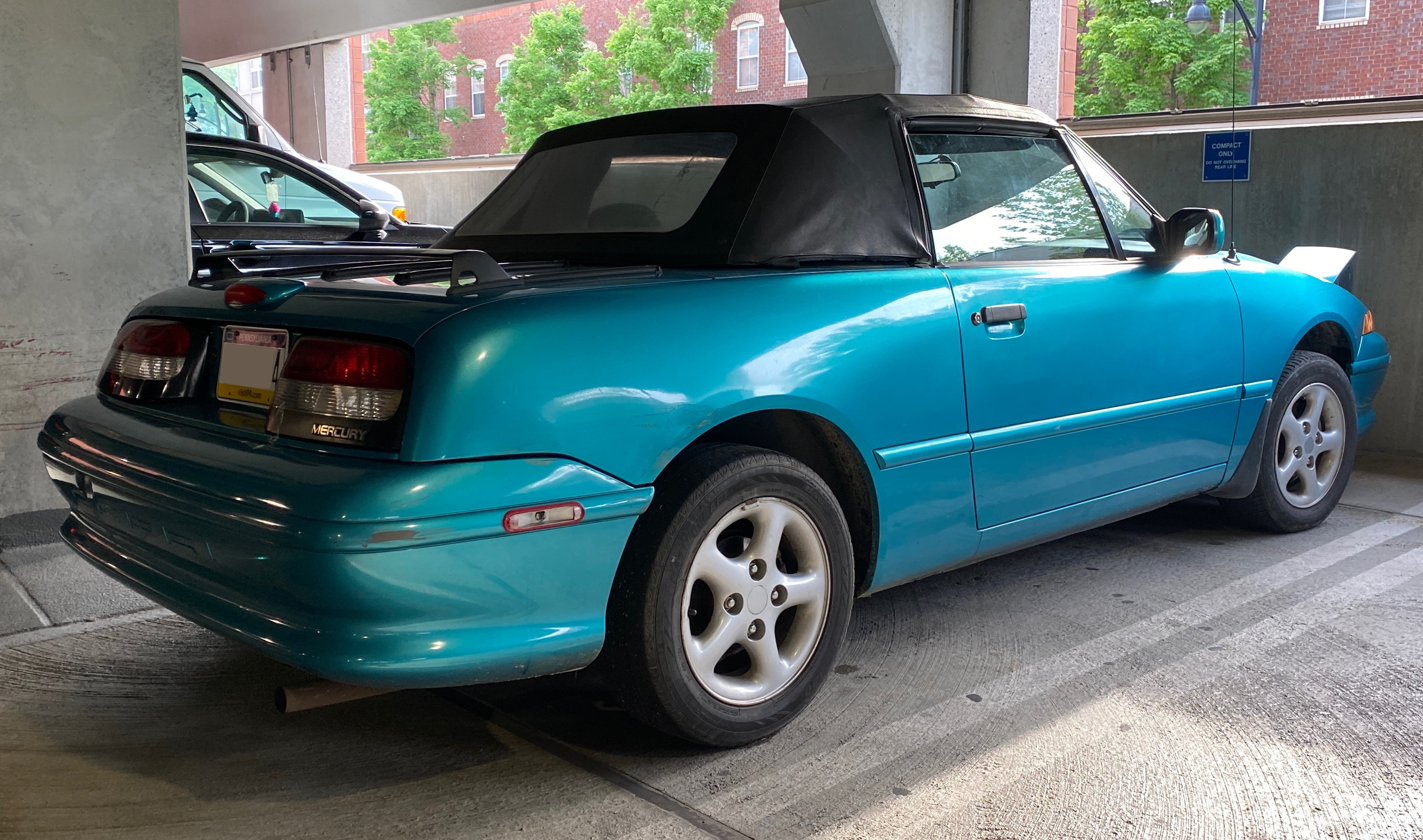
1994 Mercury Capri, rear view

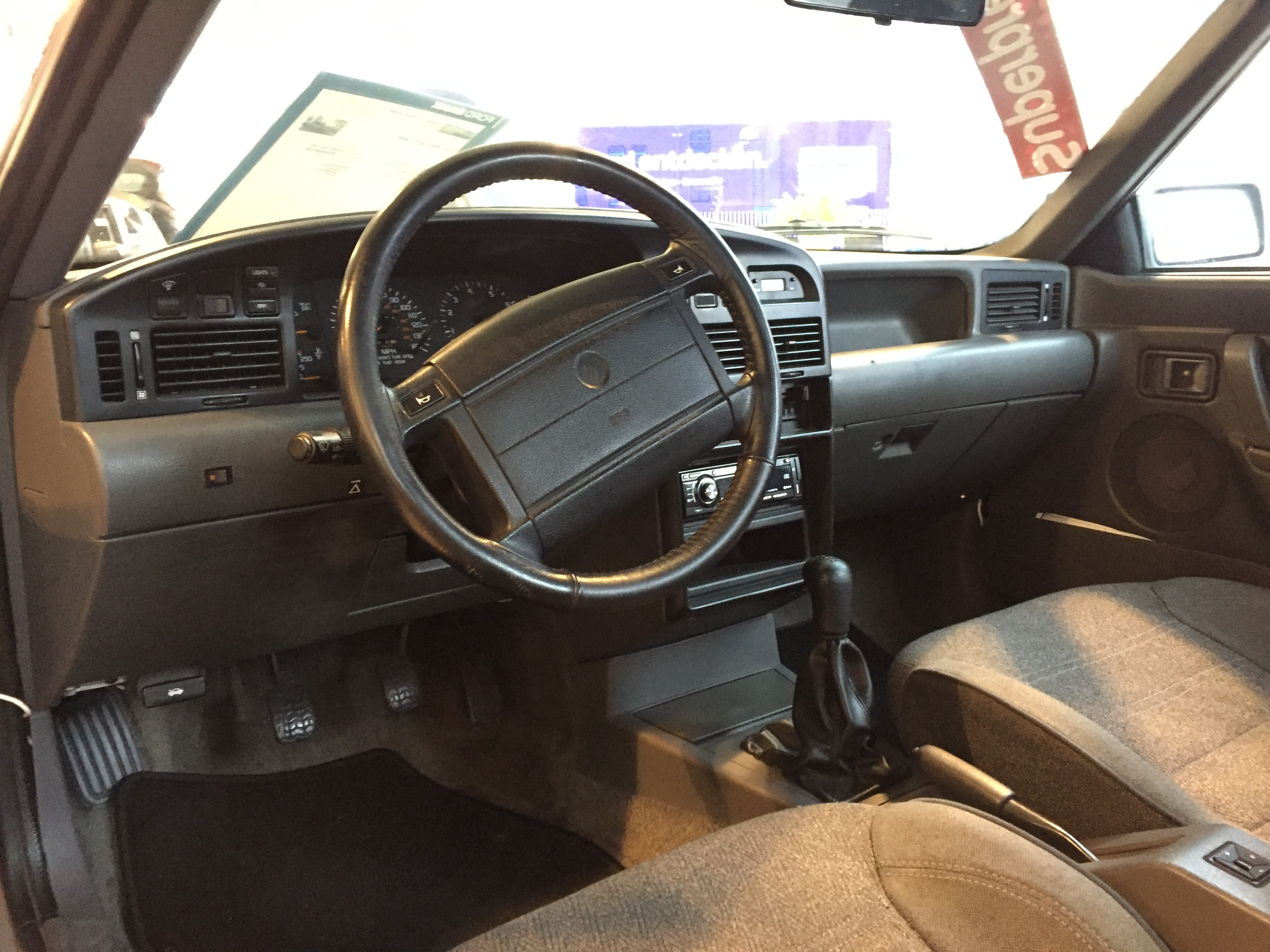
Mercury Capri interior
