= Ford Capri (Australia) =

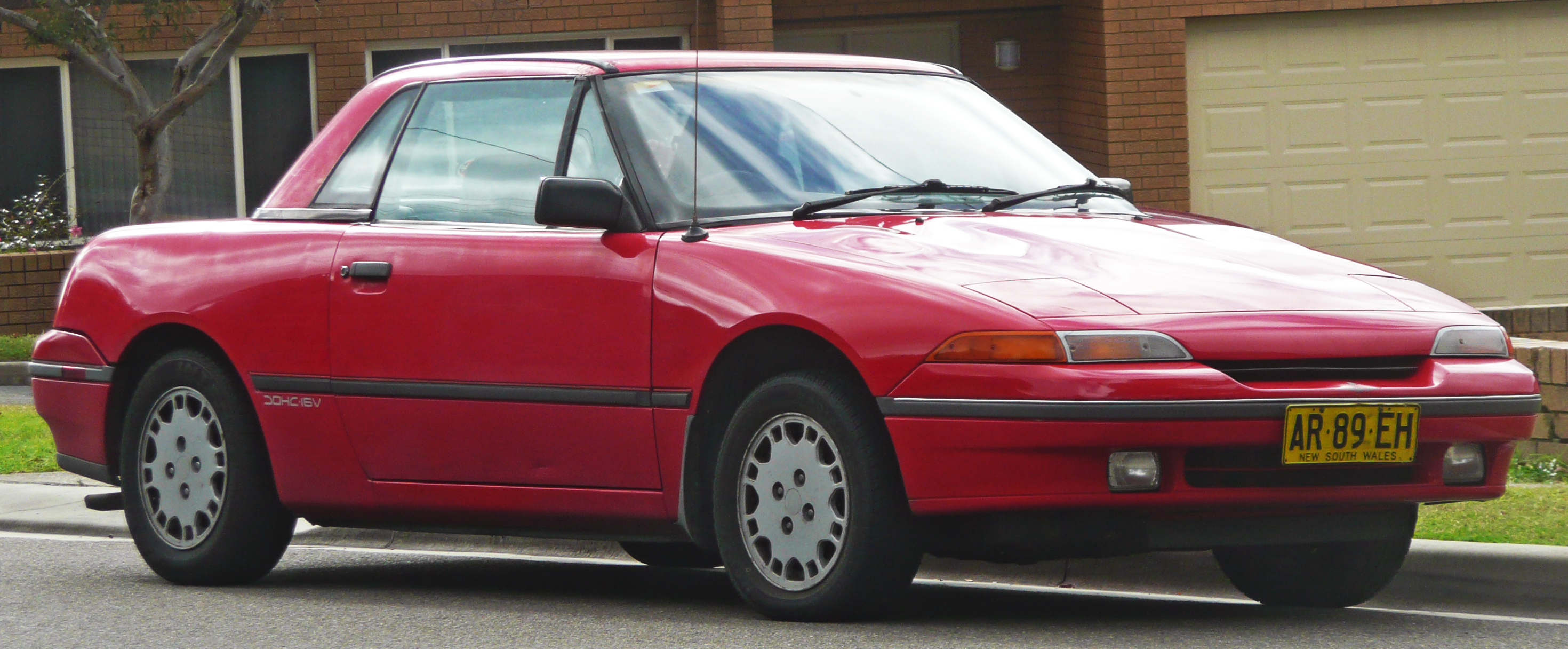
- 1989–1992 Ford Capri (SA) convertible, (pre-facelift)

Overview
- Manufacturer: Ford Australia
- Also called: Mercury Capri
- Production: 1989–1994
- Assembly: Australia: Melbourne, Victoria (Broadmeadows)

Body and chassis
- Class: Sports roadster
- Body style: 2-door convertible
- Layout: FF layout
- Platform: Mazda BF
- Related: Mazda 323

Powertrain
- Engine: 1.6 L B6-2E I4; 1.6 L B6T Turbo I4
- Transmission: 5-speed manual; 3-speed automatic

Dimensions
- Wheelbase: 2,405 mm (94.7 in)
- Length: 4,219 mm (166.1 in)
- Width: 1,641 mm (64.6 in)
- Curb weight: 1,048–1,130 kg (2,310–2,491 lb)

Chronology
- Successor: Ford Probe

The Ford Capri (SA30) (marketed in North America as the Mercury Capri) is an automobile that was designed, developed and manufactured by Ford Australia from 1989 to 1994. It marked a revival of the Ford Capri name, which was previously used by Ford of Europe from 1969 to 1986. This was also the case for the Mercury Capri name, which was last used for a badge-engineered third-generation Ford Mustang from 1979 to 1986.

The Australian Capri, codenamed the SA30, was an entry-level convertible, based on Mazda 323 running gear that Ford Australia also used in the Laser. Its exterior was designed by Ghia and interior by ItalDesign. During development of the Capri, Mazda was developing the MX-5, a vehicle that, although considerably more expensive, was commonly considered its direct competitor. Unlike the MX-5, the Capri was a 2+2 rather than a strict two-seater.

== History ==
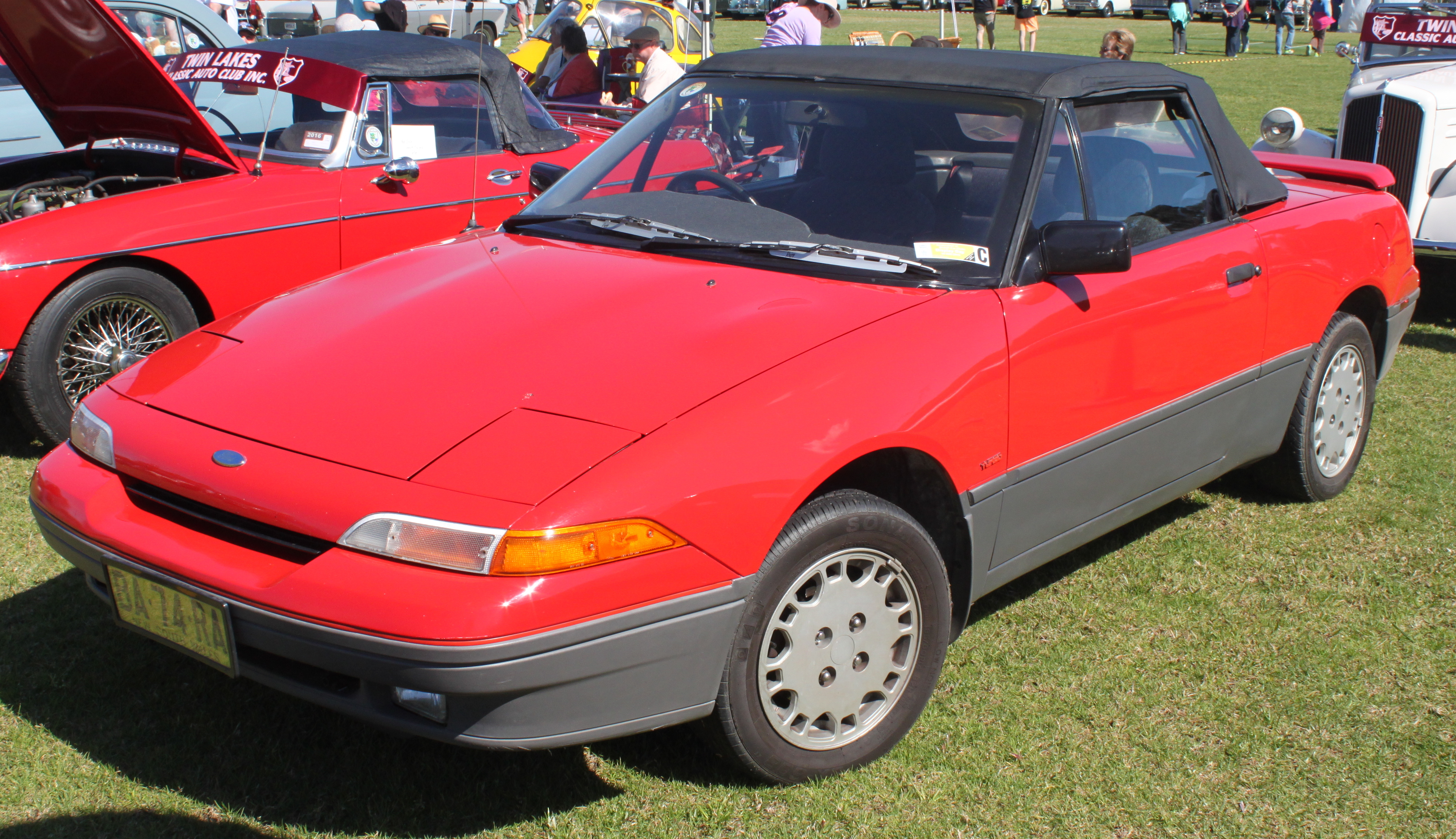

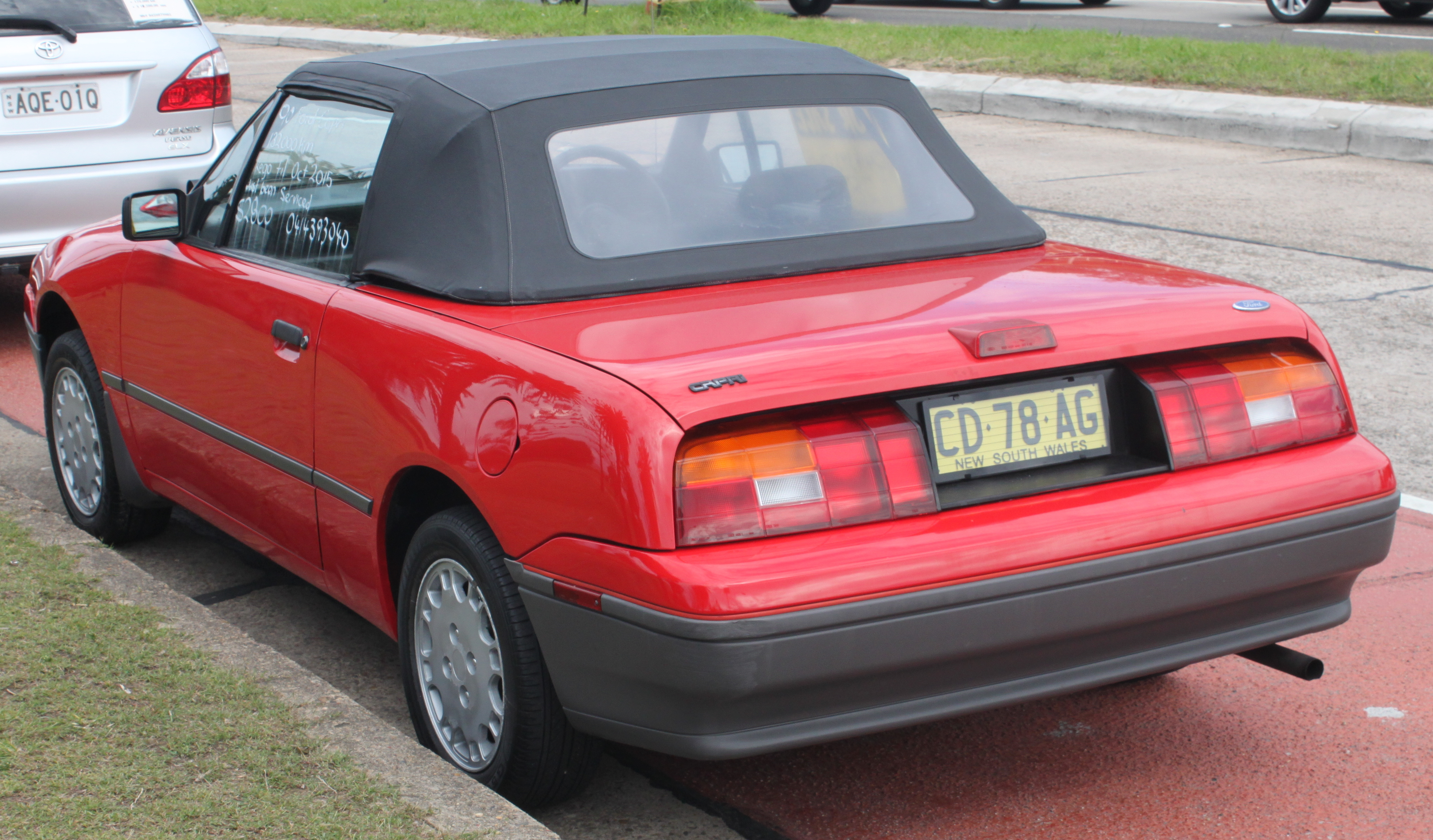
1989-1992 Ford Capri (SA) convertible (pre-facelift)

The Australian Capri was intended primarily for export to the US. Exports began in 1990 as the Mercury Capri, becoming the first Australian-assembled automobile to be exported to the US. At the time of its release, it had a poor reputation for reliability, although many still exist today perhaps due to the mechanical robustness of the Laser/323 upon which it was based. In particular, the Capri's roof was prone to leaking, due to poor-quality materials being used; although Ford quickly resolved the issue, the car's poor reputation stuck. As a result, the MX-5 was comfortably more popular in the United States (but not Australia), particularly as that car was rear-wheel-drive, and enthusiasts were skeptical about the front-wheel-drive arrangement that the Capri used.

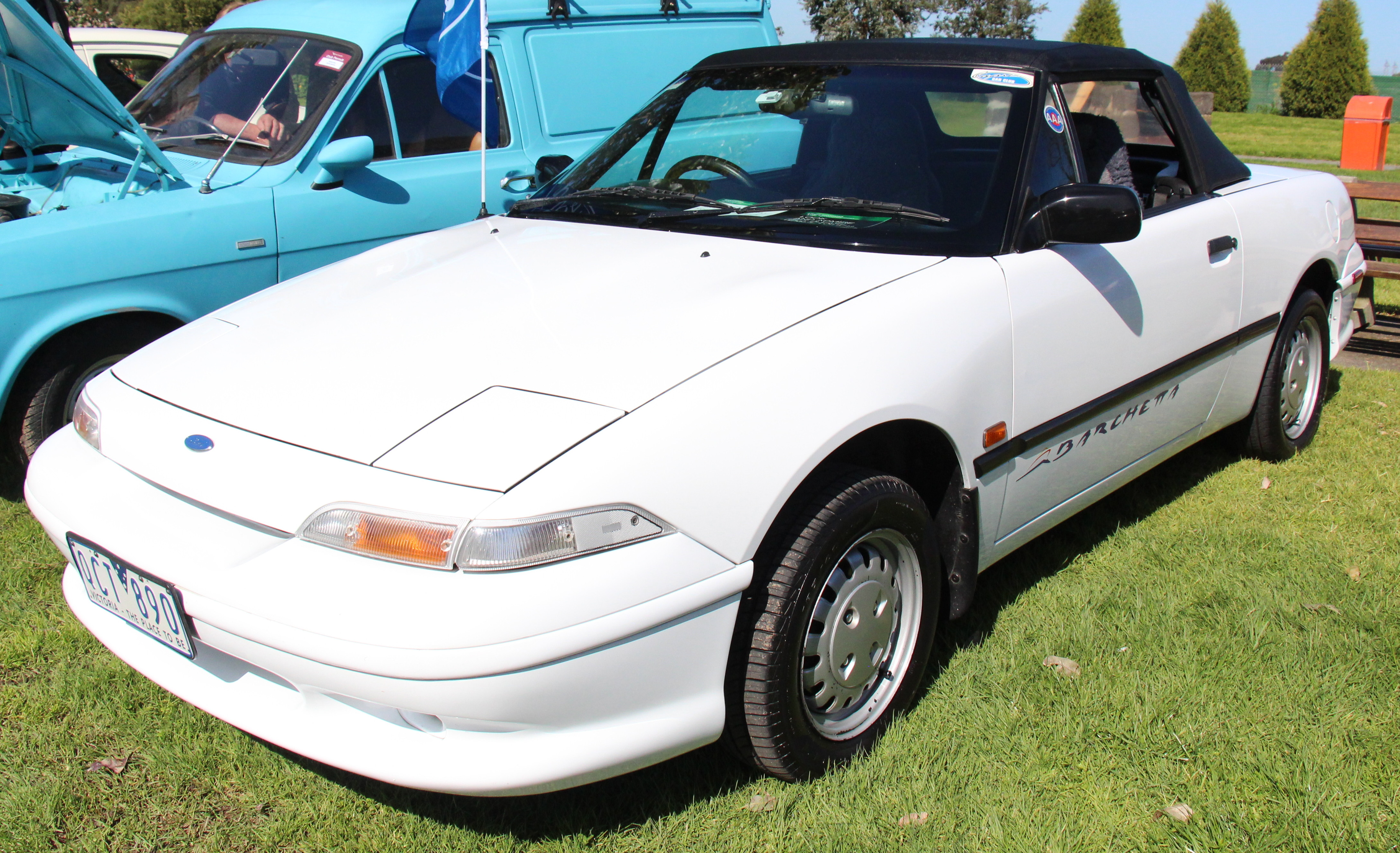

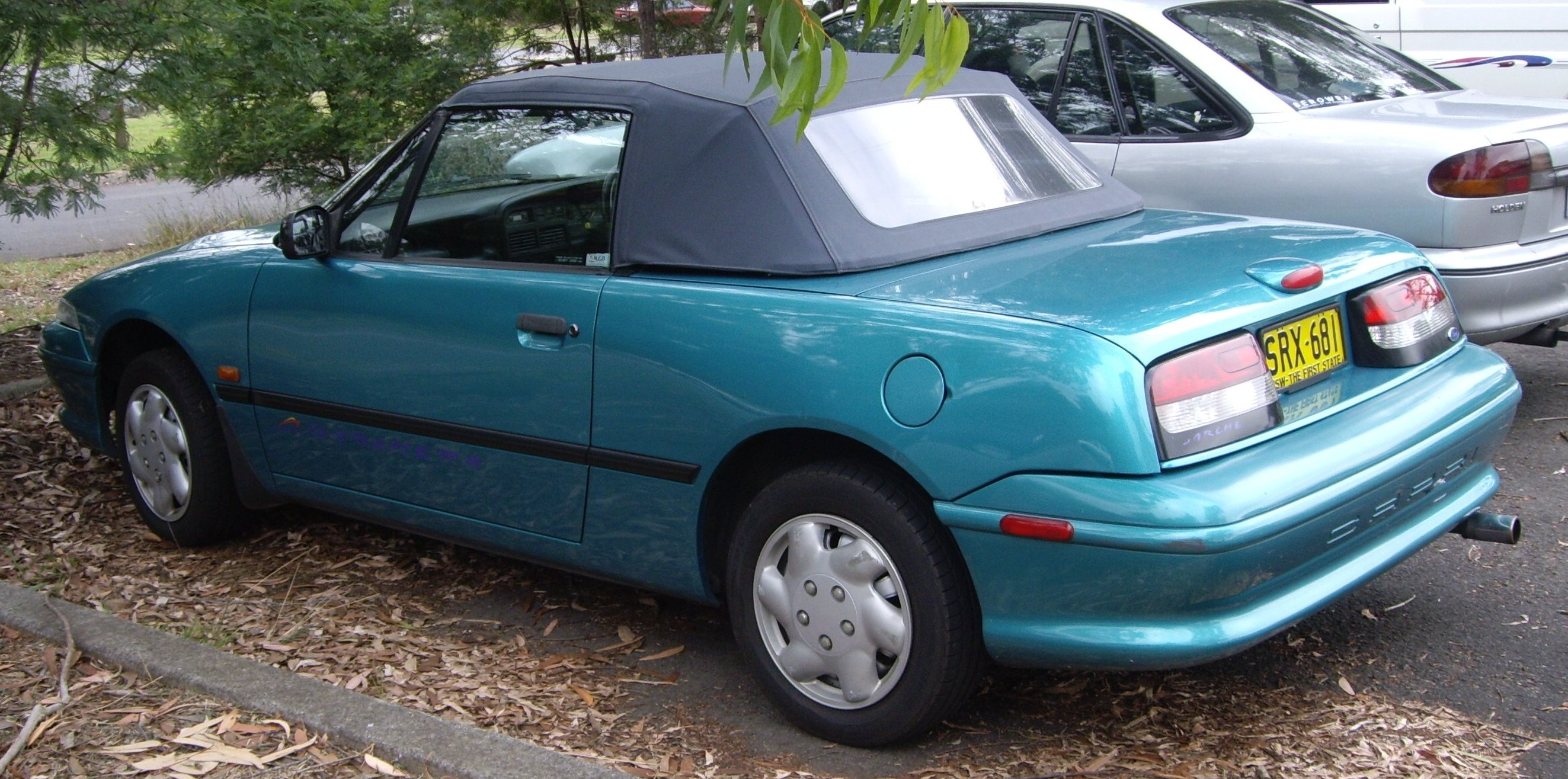
1992-1994 Ford Capri (SE), (facelift)

Two models were initially offered in the Capri's range: a base model, with a 1.6 L B6-2E SOHC inline-4 engine that produced 61 kW (82 hp; 83 PS), and a turbocharged model, which used the 1.6 L B6T DOHC inline-4, which produced 100 kW (134 hp; 136 PS). The base model was available with a 5-speed manual transmission or a 3-speed automatic transmission, whilst the turbocharged model only had the manual gearbox. In 1990, the naturally-aspirated 1.6 L B6D DOHC unit, which produced 75 kW (101 hp; 102 PS), was added to the range, and this was the only engine available in 1991.

For 1992, the Capri was updated, and given the codename SC; the turbocharged engine was also re-added to the range. An XR2 trim level was also introduced for both engines, whilst the base trim for the naturally-aspirated model was renamed Barchetta, and the base trim for the turbo model renamed to Clubsprint. In 1993, the Capri was updated again, and this time was given the codename SE. Production ended in 1994, after a total of 66,279 Capri convertibles had been built; 10,347 of these were right-hand-drive (RHD) models for the Oceania/Southeast Asia market. 9,787 Capris were sold in Australia, whilst the remaining RHD Capris went to New Zealand and Southeast Asia.

The 1989–94 Capri was assessed in the Used Car Safety Ratings 2006 as providing "worse than average" protection for its occupants in the event of a crash.
