= Broadmeadows Assembly Plant =

Former Ford Australia vehicle assembly plant

Coordinates: 37.656543°S 144.952819°E

- Built: 1959
- Location: Campbellfield, Victoria, Australia
- Industry: Motor vehicle assembly
- Products: Ford Australia
- Employees: 2088 (2011)
- Area: 45 acres (18 ha)
- Defunct: 2016

The Broadmeadows Assembly Plant was a Ford Australia automobile factory in Campbellfield, Melbourne. It spanned 45 acres (18 ha) and as of 2011, employed 2,088 workers. It opened in 1959.

In 1973, there was a large strike by mostly migrant workers over unsafe and unsanitary working conditions, and Ford's refusal to hire more workers, including a ban on female workers. The strikers fought off police and even managed to force their union to endorse them. This strike was notable due to the huge outpour of community support, with the Glaziers Union refusing to fix broken windows, doctors opening free clinics and the local Greek Orthodox Church donating to strike funds. It succeeded in its aims.

There was a second strike in 1981 called by local members of the Vehicle Builders Employees Federation, but this time, federal Union members moved to shut it down swiftly.

The Broadmeadows Assembly Plant closed on 7 October 2016 after Ford ceased manufacturing in Australia. The site was sold to the Pelligra Group in 2019 who intend to redevelop it as an industrial estate as Assembly Broadmeadows.

== Products ==
- Ford Capri
- Ford Fairlane
- Ford Falcon
- Ford Territory
- Ford Cortina
