= Ford Durango =

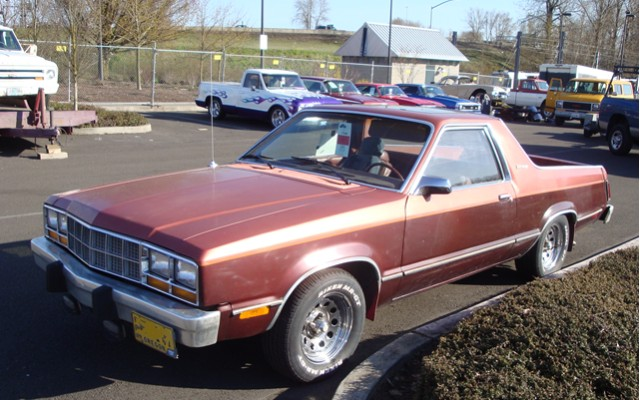
- 1981 Ford Durango

Overview
- Manufacturer: National Coach Works; Ford
- Production: 1979–1982
- Model years: 1979–1982
- Assembly: United States: Los Angeles, California (National Coach Works)

Body and chassis
- Class: Compact
- Body style: 2-door coupe utility (pickup truck)
- Layout: FR layout
- Platform: Ford Fox platform
- Related: Ford Fairmont Futura

Powertrain
- Engine: 200 in^{3} (3.3 L) Thriftpower Six I6
- Transmission: 3-speed automatic

Chronology
- Predecessor: Ford Ranchero

The Ford Durango is a two-seat coupe utility pickup truck sold in limited production by Ford Motor Company between the 1979 and 1982 model years. The vehicle was the result of a joint venture between Ford and National Coach Works, located in Los Angeles, California.

Though not produced on an official basis nor considered the replacement for the Ford Ranchero (which ended production after the 1979 model year), the Durango was developed as a potential competitor to the downsized 1978 Chevrolet El Camino; it was commissioned by Ford to be sold through its dealership network. As the El Camino derived its underpinnings from the Chevrolet Malibu station wagon, the Ford Durango was closely related to the Ford Fairmont Futura two-door coupe.

As no official totals were kept by either company production estimates vary between the low 200s and 350, with 212 conversions known to have been made by National Coach Works.

== Design overview ==
The Ford Durango prototype was designed and built by Jim Stephenson and his sons, Jim Stephenson Jr and Bill Stephenson. The custom body work was done at their shop in Pacoima, California. The prototype was made with hand fabricated sheet metal and then was sent to G&K Fiberglass in Sylmar, CA to have the fiberglass molds made to produce the pickup bed and tailgate for production of the "Durango". The rights to produce and sell the Durango to Ford dealerships were licensed to National Coach Works after Hal Koch, a friend of Jim Stephenson who worked at National Coach, saw the prototype.

=== Production ===
To produce the Durango, National Coach Works used the body of the Ford Fairmont Futura two-door coupe. Aft of the B-pillar, the roof was removed along with the trunklid and rear seating area. Behind the seats, the company added a flat-floor fiberglass cargo bed along with a bulkhead and new rear window behind the two front seats. The rear fascia above the bumper was redesigned into a fold-down tailgate. As the tailgate included the license plate and taillamps, the Durango was produced with a disclaimer warning drivers from driving with the tailgate in the down position.

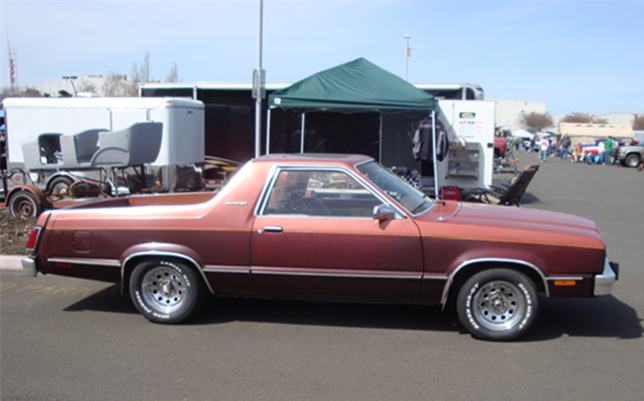
Ford Durango side profile, showing view of original B-pillar

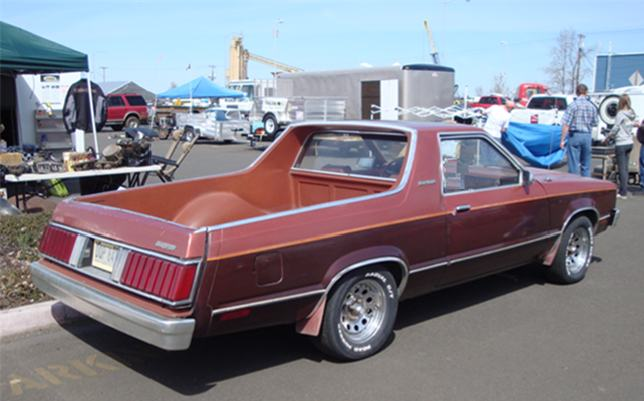
Rear 3/4 view, showing fiberglass cargo bed conversion

=== Features ===
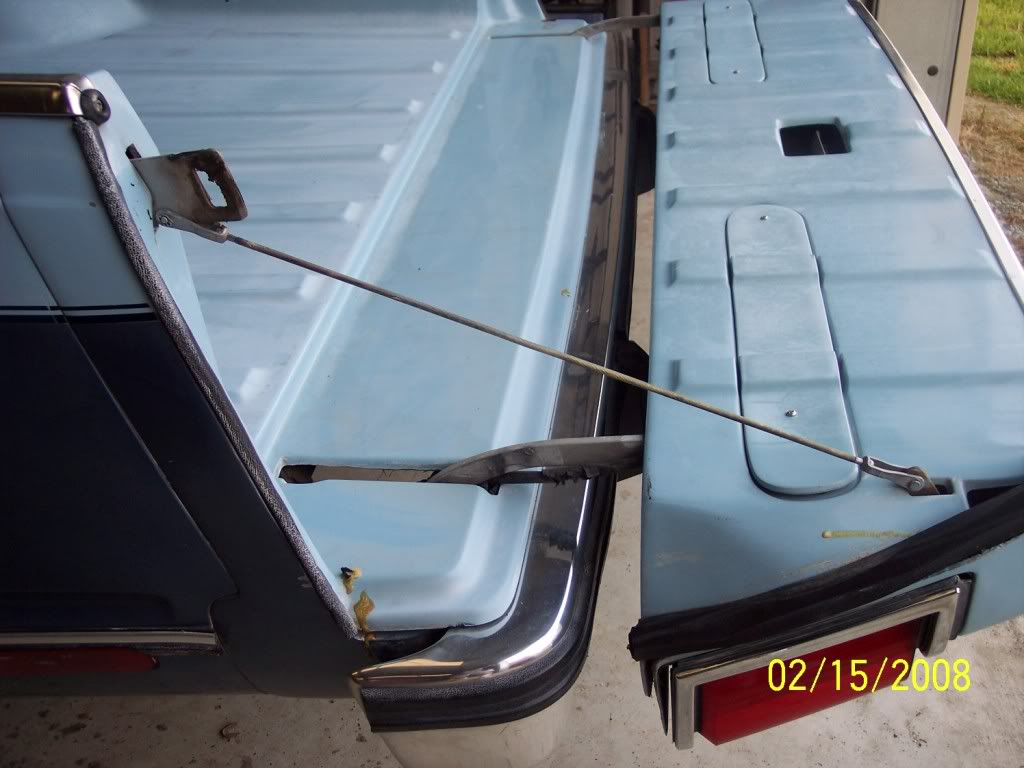
Ford Durango tailgate detail, showing filler panel and integrated taillamps

As the B-pillar design of the Fairmont Futura coupe lent itself to the conversion on an unofficial basis, there are several unique features to the Durango that identify it as a vehicle converted by National Coach. With the exception of a prototype based upon a 1979 Mercury Z-7, all examples were based upon the Fairmont Futura. Conversions by National Coach, which are the only versions with a functioning tailgate, feature a fiberglass filler panel between the cargo bed and the tailgate; the design of the panel stores the tailgate hinges when it is folded down.

As equipped from the factory, the Ford Durango was equipped only with a 200 cubic-inch inline six, the mid-range engine of the Fairmont line. The engine was paired with a three-speed automatic transmission.

The Pickup, Van and 4WD magazine from December 1981 features an article about the Durango that states: "The project had been planned for an earlier date in 1981 than that which was finally achieved, so only a little over 100 units were assembled before the current-year model went out of production." Nearly all factory-converted Durangos were produced during the 1981 model year; it is unknown how many 1982 examples were produced.
