= Ford Maverick (1970–1977) =

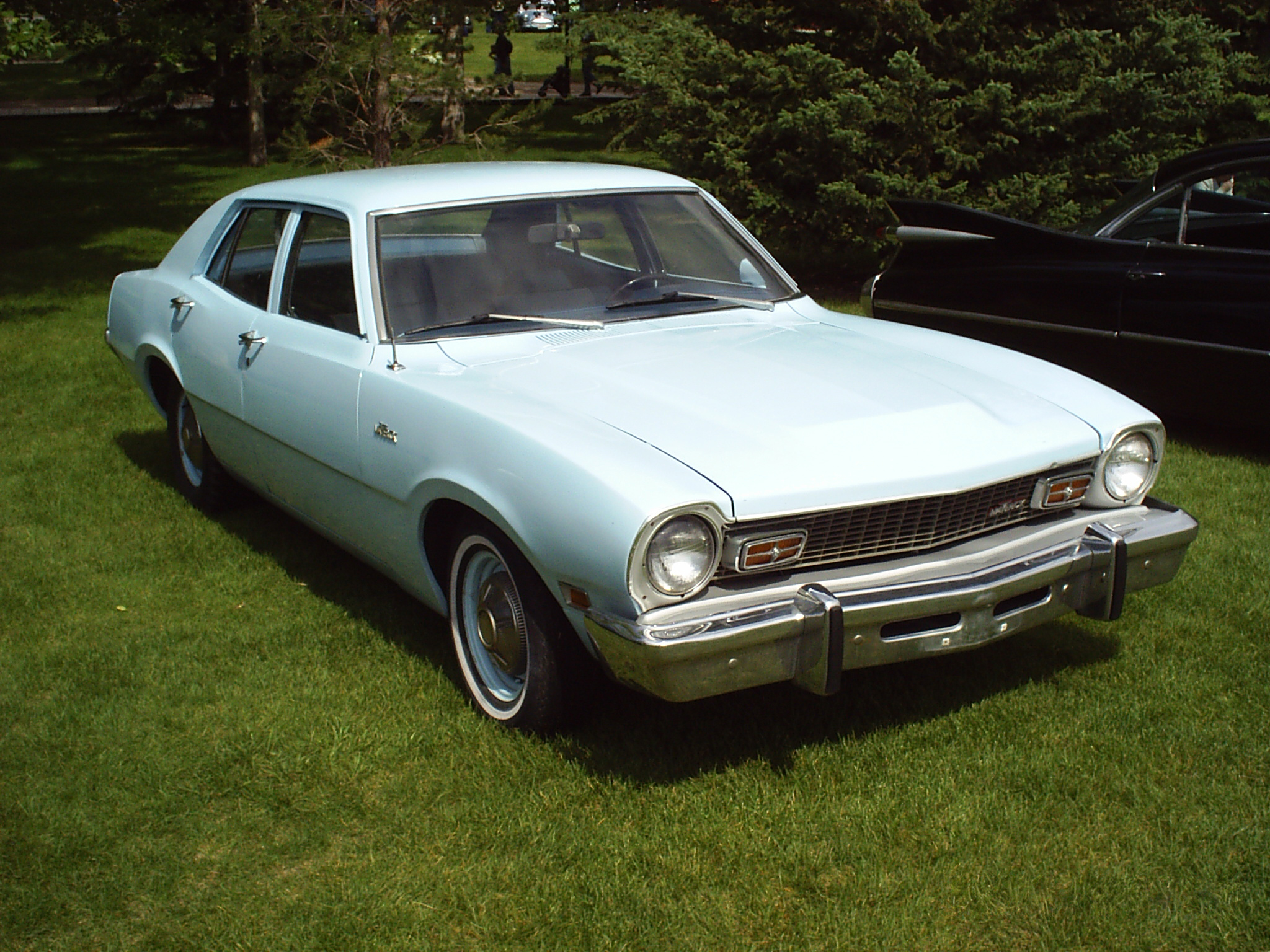
- 1973 Ford Maverick four-door sedan

Overview
- Manufacturer: Ford
- Also called: Ford Falcon Maverick (Mexico)
- Production: 1969–1977 (North America); 1973–1979 (Brazil); 1970–1977 (Venezuela)
- Assembly: United States: Claycomo, Missouri; Milpitas, California; Wayne, Michigan; Canada: Talbotville, Ontario; Canada: Oakville, Ontario; Mexico: Mexico City; Brazil: São Bernardo do Campo, São Paulo; Venezuela: Valencia, Carabobo
- Designer: Eugene Bordinat

Body and chassis
- Class: Compact
- Body style: 2-door sedan 4-door sedan
- Layout: FR layout
- Related: Ford Granada (North America); Lincoln Versailles; Mercury Comet; Mercury Monarch

Powertrain
- Engine: 170 cu in (2.8 L) Thriftpower I6; 200 cu in (3.3 L) Thriftpower I6; 250 cu in (4.1 L) Thriftpower I6; 302 cu in (4.9 L) Windsor V8
- Transmission: Ford C4 transmission in automatic models

Dimensions
- Wheelbase: 103 in (2,616 mm) (2-door); 109.9 in (2,791 mm) (4-door)
- Length: 179.4 in (4,557 mm) (2-door) (1970–1972); 187 in (4,750 mm) (2-door) (1974–1977); 193.9 in (4,925 mm) (4-door)
- Width: 70.5 in (1,791 mm)
- Height: 53.5 in (1,359 mm) (2-door); 53.4 in (1,356 mm) (4-door)
- Curb weight: 2,909 lb (1,320 kg) (2-door); 3,011 lb (1,366 kg) (sedan)

Chronology
- Predecessor: Ford Falcon (North America)
- Successor: Ford Fairmont

The Ford Maverick is a compact car that was manufactured and marketed by Ford from the 1970 to the 1977 model years. Deriving its name from unbranded range animals, the Maverick replaced the Falcon in North America. In South America and Australia, Falcon production continued separately. Initially the smallest Ford car line in the United States, the Maverick was later slotted between the Pinto and the Torino within the Ford model line. From 1971 to 1977, Lincoln-Mercury sold the Mercury Comet as the divisional counterpart of the Maverick.

In deference to its name, the fender badging of the vehicle was stylized to resemble the head of Longhorn cattle.

The Maverick utilized the rear-wheel drive chassis of its Ford Falcon predecessor, giving it design commonality with the Ford Mustang. Initially launched as a two-door fastback-roof coupe, Ford introduced a four-door Maverick sedan for 1971. Originally intended to be replaced by the Ford Granada for 1975, increased demand for the Maverick (in response to the 1973 gas crisis) led Ford to continue production of the Maverick as an entry-level compact. repackaging the Granada as a premium-level vehicle. Following the 1977 model year, the Maverick was replaced by the Ford Fairmont (the first vehicle of the Ford Fox platform).

Ford manufactured the Maverick in North America and South America, where it was built in Venezuela and Brazil. The Maverick was not successful in the Brazilian market. Following the discontinuation of the car line, the nameplate has remained in use by Ford, underpinning either SUVs or compact pickup trucks.

== Background ==
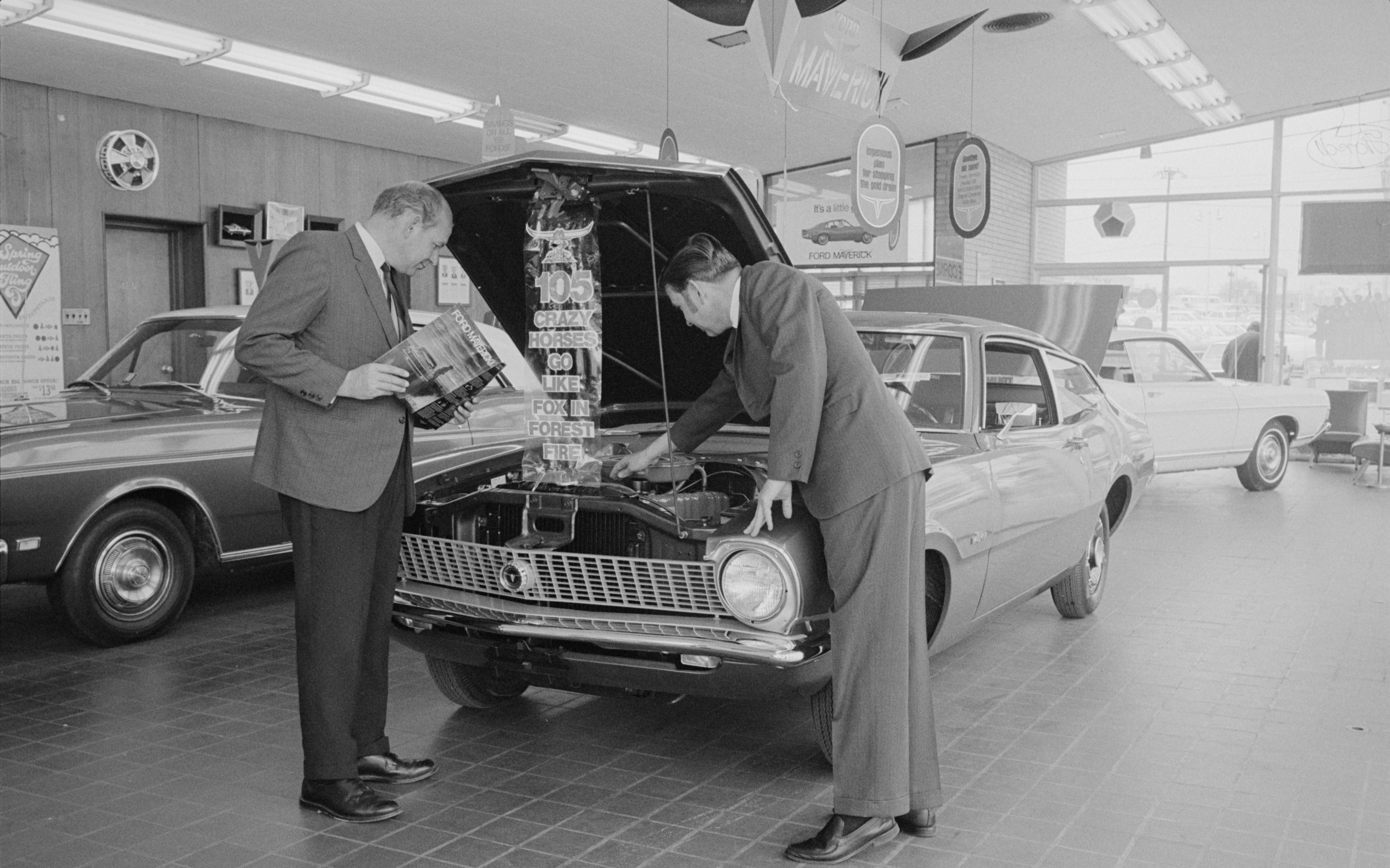
A Maverick at a car dealership in Alexandria, Virginia in 1969

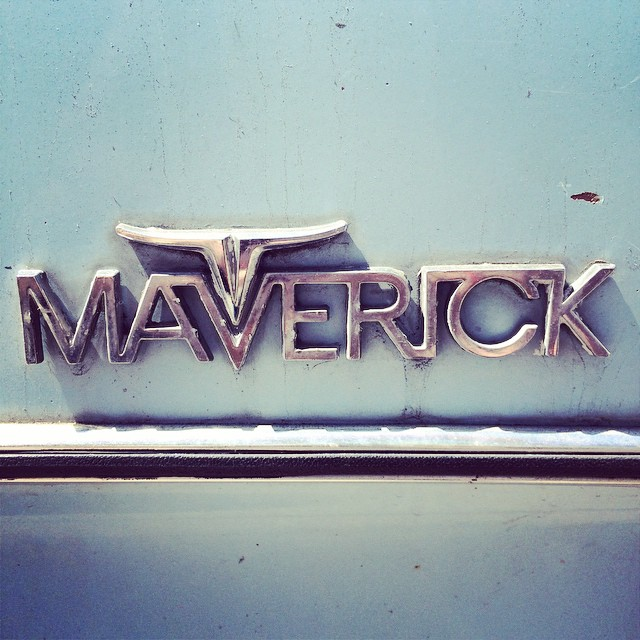
Ford Maverick emblem

The Maverick was originally conceived and marketed as a subcompact "import fighter", intended to compete against the newer Japanese rivals for North America, then primarily from the Datsun 610 and Toyota Mark II. Since 1960, Ford had sold the Ford Falcon as its compact car line. From 1960 to 1965, Mercury sold the model line as the Comet; the Falcon also served as the basis for the Ford Econoline van/pickup truck and the Ford Mustang (the namesake of the pony car segment). In the second half of the 1960s, sales of the model line underwent an extensive decline; along with facing major internal competition with the Mustang, the Falcon struggled against redesigns of the Chevrolet Nova, Dodge Dart, and Rambler American. At the end of the decade, the Falcon was in its third generation (introduced for 1966 as a shorter-wheelbase Ford Fairlane); following the introduction of FMVSS by NHTSA (taking effect on January 1, 1970), Ford was unable to legally sell the Falcon beyond December 31, 1969 without a full redesign of the vehicle. Following the end of the 1969 calendar year, Ford retired the Falcon (after a shortened 1970 model year). For the second half of the 1970 model year, Ford introduced a "1970½" Falcon, serving as an entry-level variant of the Fairlane (making it an intermediate-size car line). For 1971, the intermediate-size Falcon was dropped (alongside the Fairlane), as Ford made the Torino its sole intermediate-size line.

=== Development ===
During the late 1960s, Ford underwent research analysis of the small car segment, specifically focusing on the expansion of small-car sales from manufacturers outside of North America. The company found that imported-vehicle sales were on the verge of expanding past 1 million sales in 1968; while imports held a 10% market share across the US, the market share was much higher across various regions. Though the Ford Pinto subcompact had already undergone development, Ford found that a gap existed in the small-car market – a car bigger than the Pinto and the VW Beetle (and most of its Japanese-brand competitors), but slightly smaller than the Falcon. Such a car could serve as a large car for import-minded buyers, while as a small car for buyers favoring American brands; it would also serve dual roles: a second/third car in multi-vehicle households or as an alternative to used vehicles. To fill the gap in the market, Ford wanted to build a car that was sensible, yet would be sensational on its own merits. Development of the Ford Falcon successor vehicle began in 1967 as "Project Dragonfly II" under a $100 million budget. By the end of the year, design work was nearly finished on the exterior. Though it was replacing the Falcon, to keep production costs low, Project Dragonfly II effectively became a continuation of the Falcon, using the same chassis (shortened to a 103-inch wheelbase), along with the brakes, suspension, and drivetrain of the Falcon and Mustang. The body was styled as a two-door fastback coupe, adopting the long-hood, short deck profile popularized by the 1965-1968 Mustang; along with reducing production costs, the design was styled with minimal chrome trim. In contrast to the Mustang, the design was produced with a B-pillar and pop-out rear side windows (replacing roll-down glass). Though the feature was largely declining in production, the front doors were produced without vent windows.

=== Ford "Simple Machine" ===
A key project objective was to produce the car with a base price of under $2,000 – along with coming within $500 of the Volkswagen Beetle, the final $1,995 ($16,540 in 2025 dollars) price was not only close to matching the smaller VW, but only $83 higher than the base price of the 1960 Ford Falcon. Along with reducing chrome usage to a minimum, the new car limited its Ford badging to the hubcaps (using only nameplate badging). The interior followed suit, using an instrument cluster with only a speedometer and fuel gauge. The dashboard lacked a glovebox, with Ford replacing it with a European-style full-width shelf underneath the dashboard. At the end of 1968, Project Dragonfly was given a model name, trademarking the Ford Maverick model name. The name was inspired by free-range cattle of the Southwest United States (a term named after Texas land baron and politician Samuel Maverick), promoting independence and free-spiritedness to both nonconformist and customary buyers. In deference to its name, the nameplate badging of the vehicle was stylized to resemble the head of Longhorn cattle. To further attract import-minded buyers, Lee Iaccoca marketed the Maverick as the "Simple Machine"; not only was the Maverick simple to buy, but also own and operate. In addition to its intended low cost of ownership, Ford also focused on its greater functionality: as it was not a subcompact, the Maverick offered more interior room and luggage space, and was safer than smaller cars (designed with a primitive form of crumple zones). To attract younger buyers, Ford marketed the Maverick with 15 different colors - 5 of them bore their names from puns, including "Anti-Establish Mint", "Hulla Blue", "Original Cinnamon", "Freudian Gilt", and "Thanks Vermillion"; the other 10 were more typical, including Black Jade, Champagne Gold, Gulfstream Aqua, Meadowlark Yellow, Brittany Blue, Lime Gold, Dresden Blue, Raven Black, Wimbledon White, and Candyapple Red. Ford's Lee Iacocca reported that the pun-names had been sent to him by a friend, who also supplied others not chosen by Iacocca: "Goodclean Fawn," "Down Umber" and "Mickey Moss." Ford TV commercials marketing the Maverick shared the same music as other Ford ads in the 1969 model year campaign, named "Ford, it's the going thing." Commercials and advertising compared the Maverick, at $1,995, to the smaller Volkswagen Beetle, which was about $500 less.

=== Model introduction ===
The Ford Maverick was introduced on April 17, 1969 as a 1970 model. The date was intentionally selected, as it was five years to the day after Ford released the 1965 Mustang. Coinciding with its April launch, the 1970 Maverick was sold for nearly 18 months (the same as the 1965 Mustang). The Maverick would go on to become one of the most successful car launches in Ford history. In its first three days of sale, Ford was met with 22,000 orders for the model line, with over 100,000 delivered in the first 90 days. The 1970 Maverick is second only to 1965 Mustang in first-year sales, though its 578,914 units sold during calendar 1970 is the highest-ever total for the company (as of current production). During 1970, the Maverick played a major role in the expansion of Ford market share in the US. Alongside Ford rising to a 31% share of new-car production, the Maverick expanded the company's share in the small-car segment (rising from 9% to 25%). With over 1 million people visiting in the first 3 days of its launch, Ford dealerships saw the interest in the Maverick improve sales of its entire model line, with customers also purchasing the Falcon, Torino, and the Custom/Galaxie/LTD.

== Model history ==
At its April 1969 launch, the Ford Maverick was marketed as the first car line of the 1970s. While the Volkswagen Beetle had predated the Maverick by two decades in the US market, the Ford predated the Chevrolet Vega and AMC Gremlin for over a year, alongside the Toyota Corolla and Datsun 1200. Initially the smallest vehicle in the Ford model line, the Maverick was sold alongside both the compact 1970 Ford Falcon and its 1970½ intermediate namesake. For 1971, the Maverick was slotted between the smaller Ford Pinto and the larger Ford Torino (later, Ford LTD II). For its production, the Maverick was most closely matched to the AMC Hornet in size.

=== 1970–1972 ===
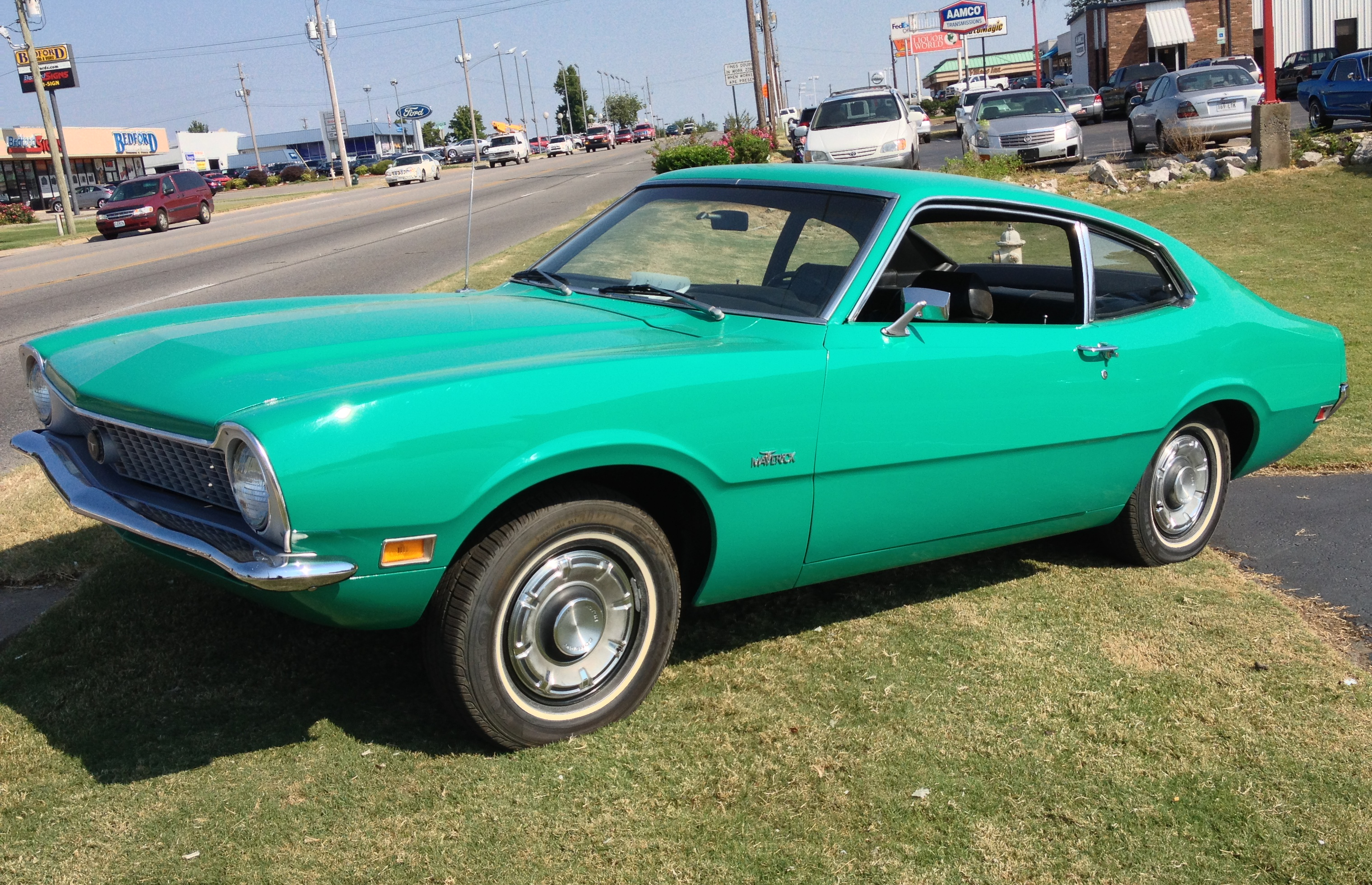
1970-1972 Ford Maverick two-door

1971 Ford Maverick four-door

For 1970, the Ford Maverick was marketed solely as a two-door coupe. Though substantially larger than its imported competitors, the launch of the model line proved popular, with some vehicles taking 60 to 90 days to reach their owners. Early 1969 production vehicles featured two-spoke steering wheels with partial horn rings (also found on other 1969 Fords), while in late 1969, production was changed to revised steering wheels with no horn rings. Early examples located the ignition switch in the instrument panel, while cars built after September 1, 1969 featured an ignition switch mounted on the locking steering column (as did all other 1970 Fords), a change made in compliance with a new federal safety mandate that took effect with the 1970 model year. Vehicles produced for sale during 1970 were fitted with internal door side-impact beams. As a running change, Ford upgraded the front suspension components, as Ford dealerships had complained that the early-production design made the front axle hard to align. 1971 brought several functional upgrades and expansions of the model line. Alongside the addition of an optional V8 engine (requiring a redesign of the floorpan), several revisions were made to the suspension (with V8 vehicles adding extra engine and suspension bracing); vehicles with the 250 I6 and the 302 V8 were fitted with 5-lug wheels. Externally, amber front turn signal lenses replaced the previous clear-lens units. The interior became optionally available with front bucket seats (with a floor-mounted shifter added as an option). To better market the model line as a family car, a four-door Maverick sedan joined the coupe, adding 6.9 inches to the wheelbase; in contrast to larger Ford sedans, the four-door Maverick was fitted with a similar-profile roof as the coupe. The Mercury division introduced its divisional counterpart of the Maverick, reintroducing the Mercury Comet nameplate (introduced for 1962 as the counterpart of the Ford Falcon). Sharing nearly its entire body with the Maverick, the Comet was distinguished from its Ford counterpart with a different grille and hood, interior and exterior trim, and its use of four-pod taillamps. For 1972, the model line saw relatively few changes. An FM radio became optional, and the Sprint trim package was introduced (commemorating the 1972 Olympics). The Luxury Decor Option (LDO) was introduced in the spring of 1972, adding upgraded exterior and interior trim. Corresponding with the move to a 12-month model year, the Maverick would decline in sales for 1971 and 1972, but the four-door sedan proved successful, adopting a significant portion of sales. Though facing competition from the smaller Pinto, sales of the Maverick were influenced by the 1971 redesign of the Mustang (placing the two car lines further apart).

=== 1973–1974 ===
For 1973, the Maverick underwent several additional revisions. The body was fitted with a 5-mph front bumper; in another visible change, all Mavericks were fitted with the grille previously used by the Grabber/LDO trims (moving the front turn signals between the headlamps. In another change, 14-inch 5-lug wheels became standard across the model line; aluminum wheels were introduced as an option. Dependent on specification, a vinyl roof became available as an option. The interior saw more visible changes; along with redesigned door panels, the bucket seats were redesigned. Distinguished by the addition of a glovebox (added in December 1973), the dashboard underwent multiple changes, including a redesign of the dashboard switches and climate-control vents. The Luxury Decor Option (LDO) was introduced, adding upgraded exterior and interior trim For 1974, the exterior was distinguished by the adoption of a 5-mph rear bumper; the change brought the curb weight of the four-door sedan to over 3000 pounds. Alongside the addition of front disc brakes, radial tires were introduced as an option. Several features were introduced to the interior (optionally), including an AM/FM radio, map lights, and a manually-dimming rear view mirror. From 1972 to 1974, sales of the Maverick increased yearly; demand for the model line was heavily influenced by the 1973 gas crisis. Though less fuel-efficient than the Pinto and its subcompact competitors, the Maverick became an alternative for buyers seeking increased fuel efficiency over full-size and intermediate vehicles, with the four-door sedan ultimately overtaking the coupe in sales. Ford originally intended to retire the Maverick after 1974 in favor of the Granada, but the success of the model (in response to the fuel crisis) led Ford to change direction, continuing the Maverick and repackaging the Granada as a premium-level compact car.

1973 Ford Maverick two-door (showing front 5mph bumper)

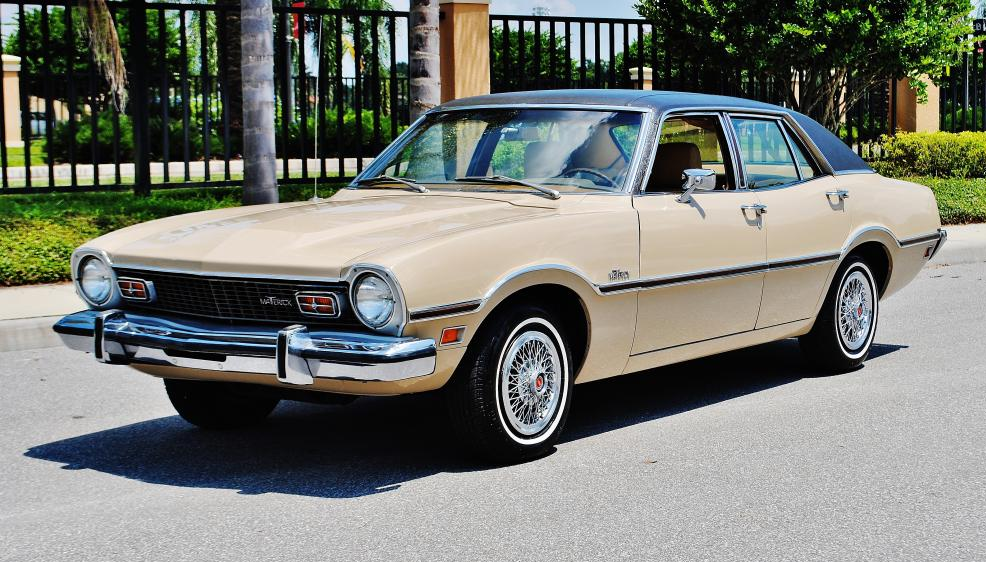
1973 Ford Maverick 4-door sedan (Ford Granada wire wheel covers)

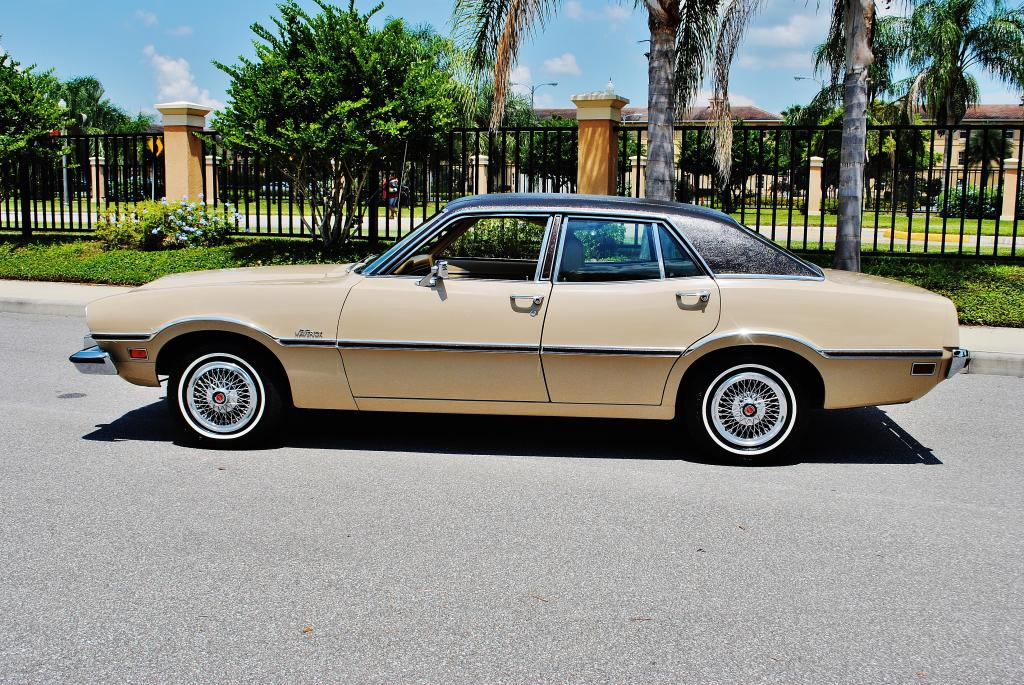
1973 Ford Maverick 4-door sedan (side profile)

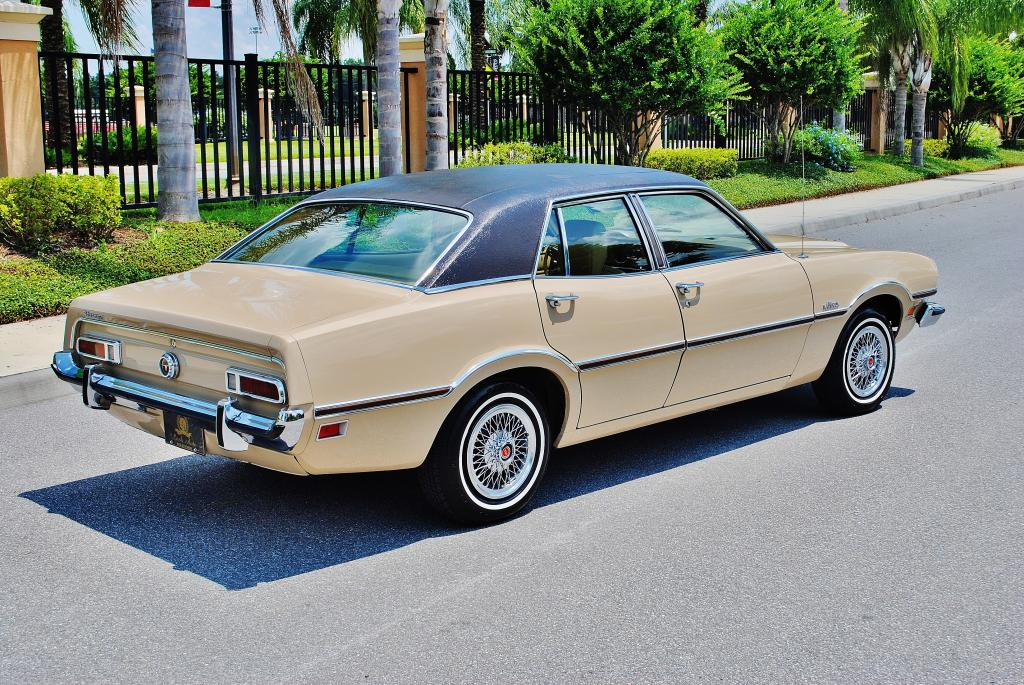
1973 Ford Maverick 4-door sedan (rear side view)

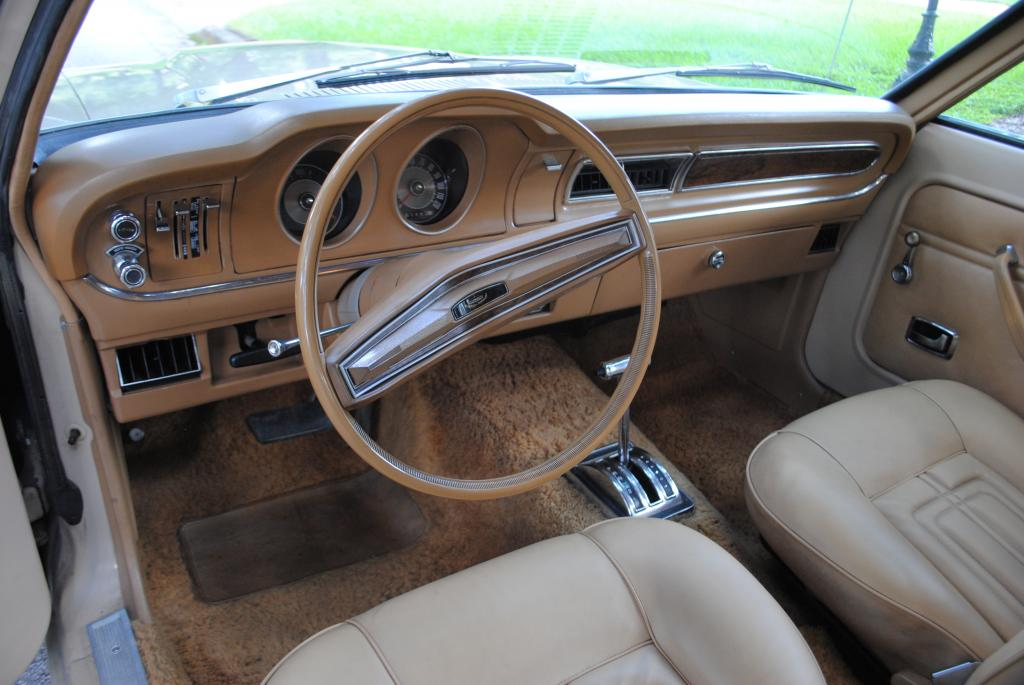
1973 Ford Maverick 4-door sedan interior

=== 1975–1977 ===
1975 Ford Maverick two-door (showing "FORD" lettering)

For 1975, the Maverick underwent several functional upgrades, inheriting several features from the newly-introduced Granada (which shared its Falcon-based chassis with the four-door Maverick). The fuel tank (regardless of engine) was increased in size from 16 to 19 gallons, and electronic ignition as added to all three engines. As an option, power disc brakes were introduced. The interior remained largely unchanged, with the dashboard receiving an 85-mph speedometer. The Maverick became visibly badged as a Ford, as "FORD" lettering was added to both the hood and decklid. For 1976, the grille was redesigned (distinguished by a central divider). The front drum brakes were retired, with Ford moving to front disc brakes (manual or power); the parking brake was changed to a foot-operated design. In a major revision, the Maverick Grabber was retired and replaced by the Stallion option package; the Luxury Decor Option was also dropped. For the first time, a cassette player (8-track) was offered as an option. 1977 was the final year of the model line (in North America). Functionally unchanged from the 1976 model year, the 1977 Maverick adopted additional features from the Granada, including wire wheel covers and aluminum wheels. A police-car option package was introduced, but sold less than 400 units, as it was found to be insufficiently upgraded for police use. From 1975 onward, the Maverick underwent a sharp decline in sales. Initially influenced by the introduction of the Ford Granada, sales declined further in anticipation of the 1978 Ford Fairmont, which directly replaced the Maverick. Released as a completely new model line, the Fairmont was smaller and lighter than the Maverick, with its Ford Fox platform using a much more modern design than the Ford Falcon chassis (dating to 1960).

== Powertrain details ==
For its release during the spring of 1969, the standard engine for the Ford Maverick was a 144 cu in (2.4 L) inline-six; this engine was dropped from the model line within the first month of production. For the rest of the 1970 model year, the Maverick was fitted with a standard 170 cu in (2.8 L) inline-6 (producing 105 hp) and an optional 200 cu in (3.3 L) inline-6 (producing 120 hp). At the end of 1970 production, a 250 cu in (4.1 L) inline-6 was offered as an additional option (producing 155 hp); this engine was offered only with a 3-speed automatic transmission. Alongside the standard 3-speed column-shifted manual transmission (a floor-mounted shifter was optional), the Maverick was offered with an optional 3-speed semi-automatic gearbox (paired to the 170 inline-6) and a 3-speed automatic transmission; the semi-automatic gearbox was dropped after 1970. For 1971, a 302 cu in (4.9 L) V8 was introduced as an option (producing 210 hp); the inline-6 engines were revised for lower compression (with correspondingly decreased power output). Alongside further reduction in compression for 1972, power output switched from gross figures to net figures (visibly reducing output further). For 1973, the 170 inline-6 was dropped, with the 200 inline-6 becoming standard, alongside the 250 inline-6 and 302 V8. For the rest of its production in North America, the Maverick offered this three-engine model range.

== Trim packages ==
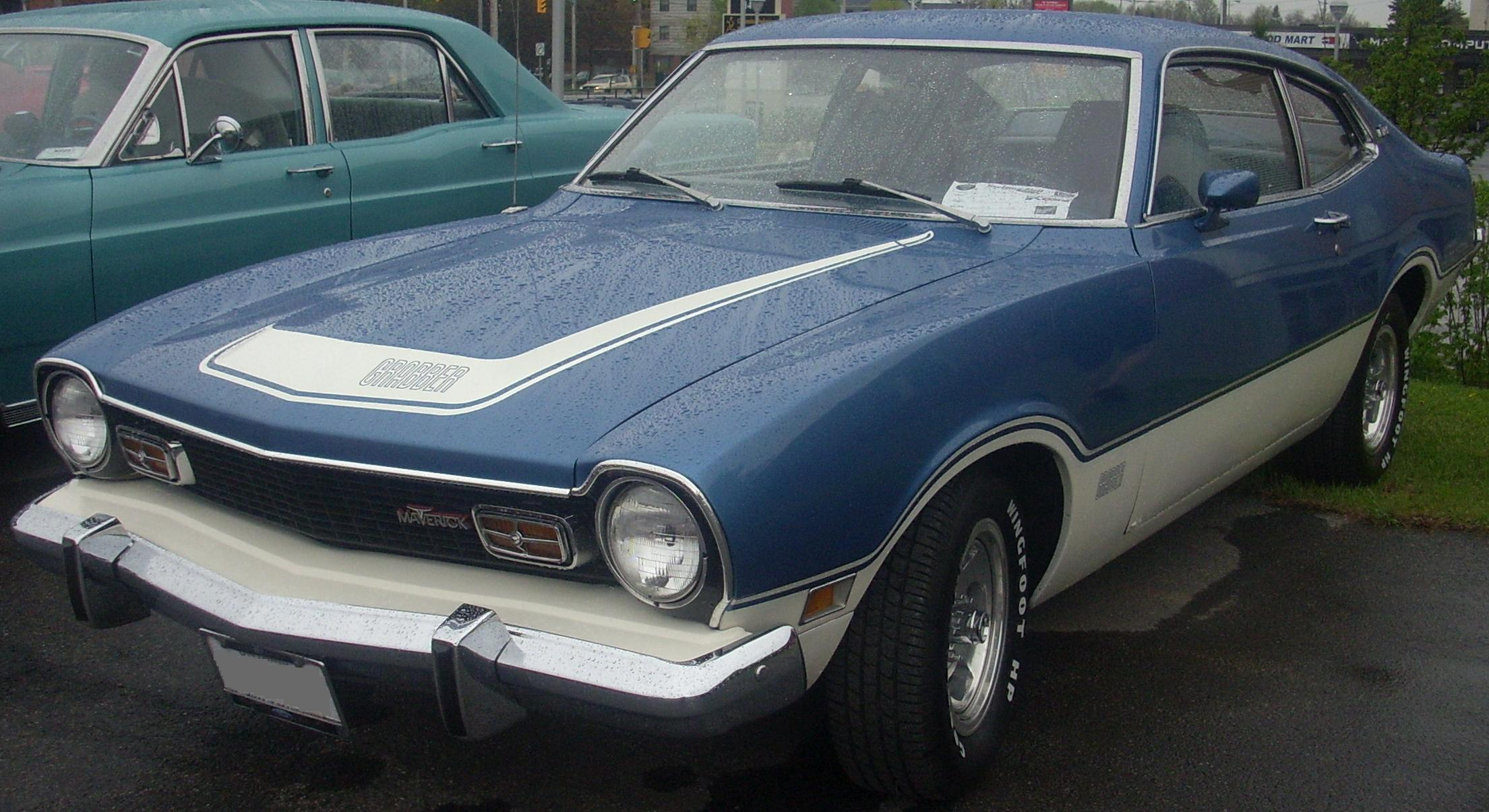
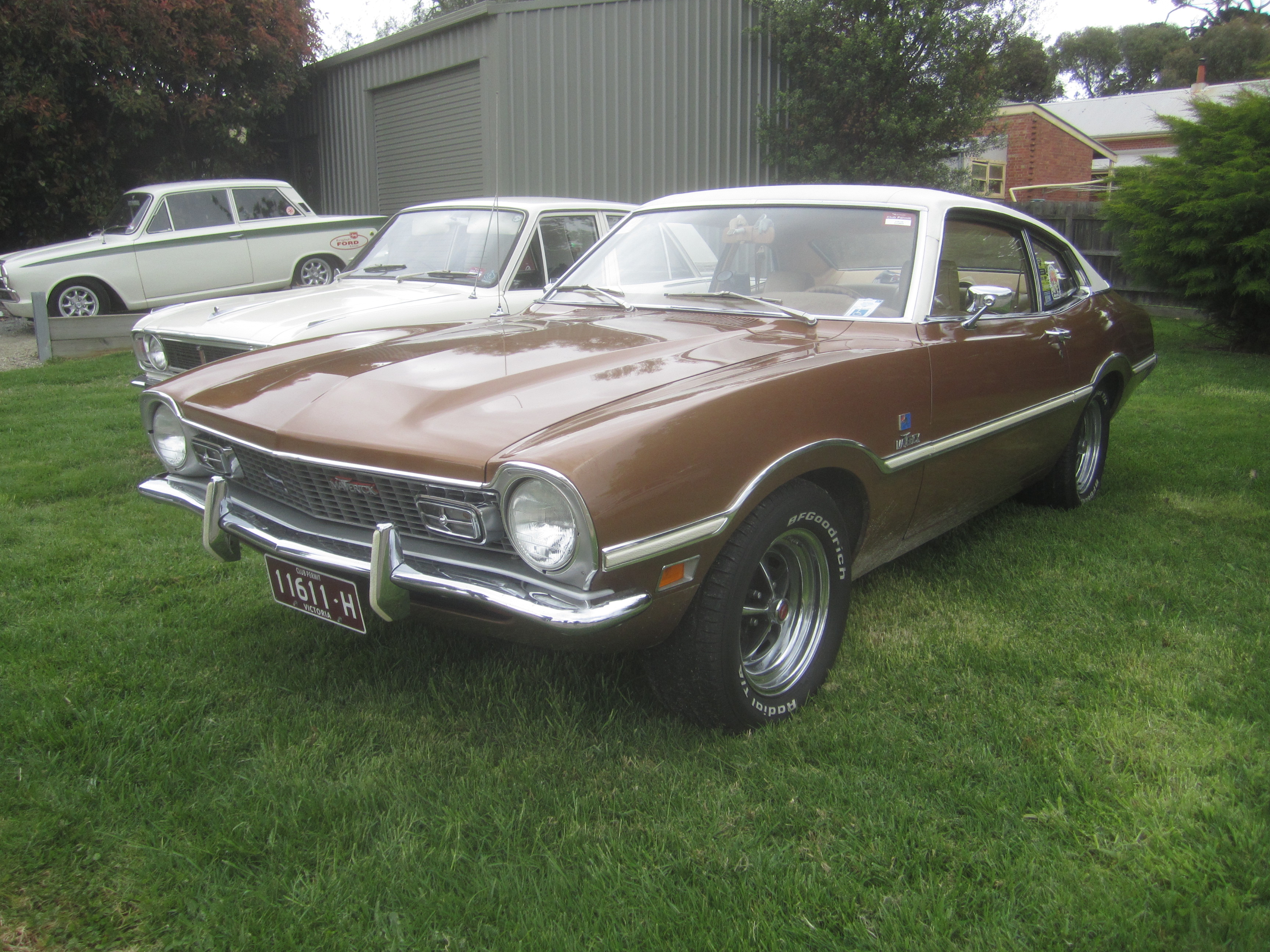
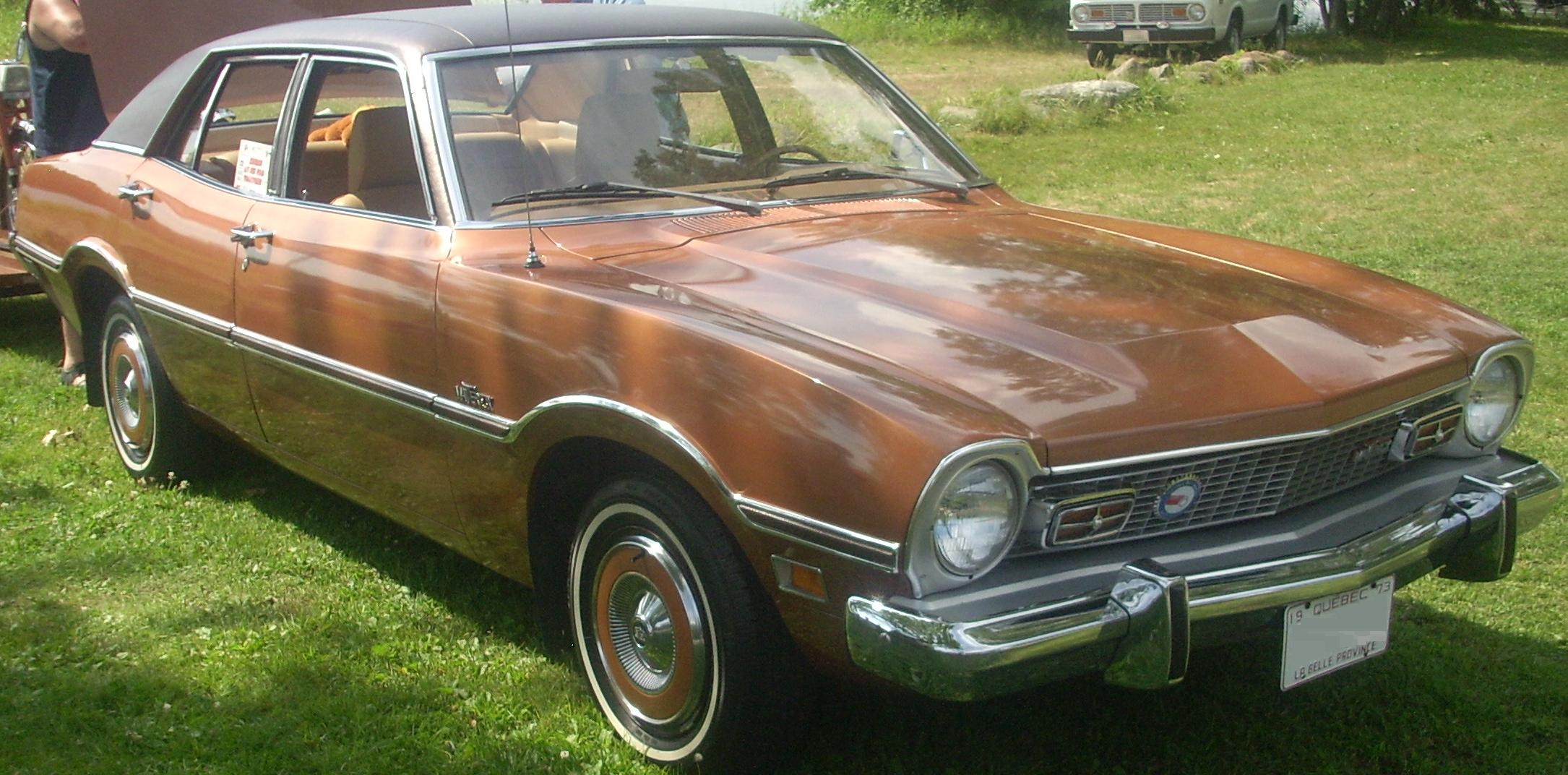
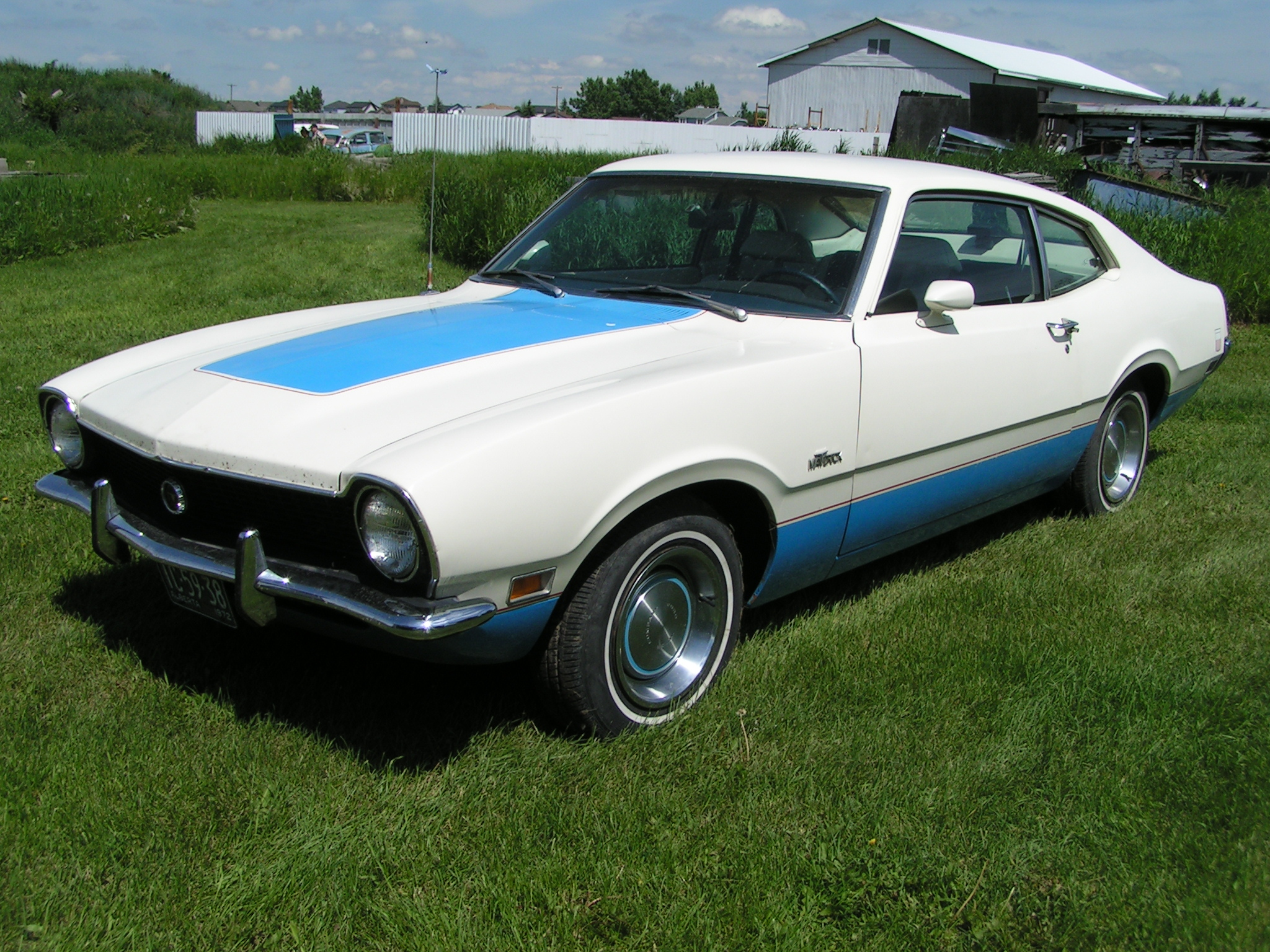
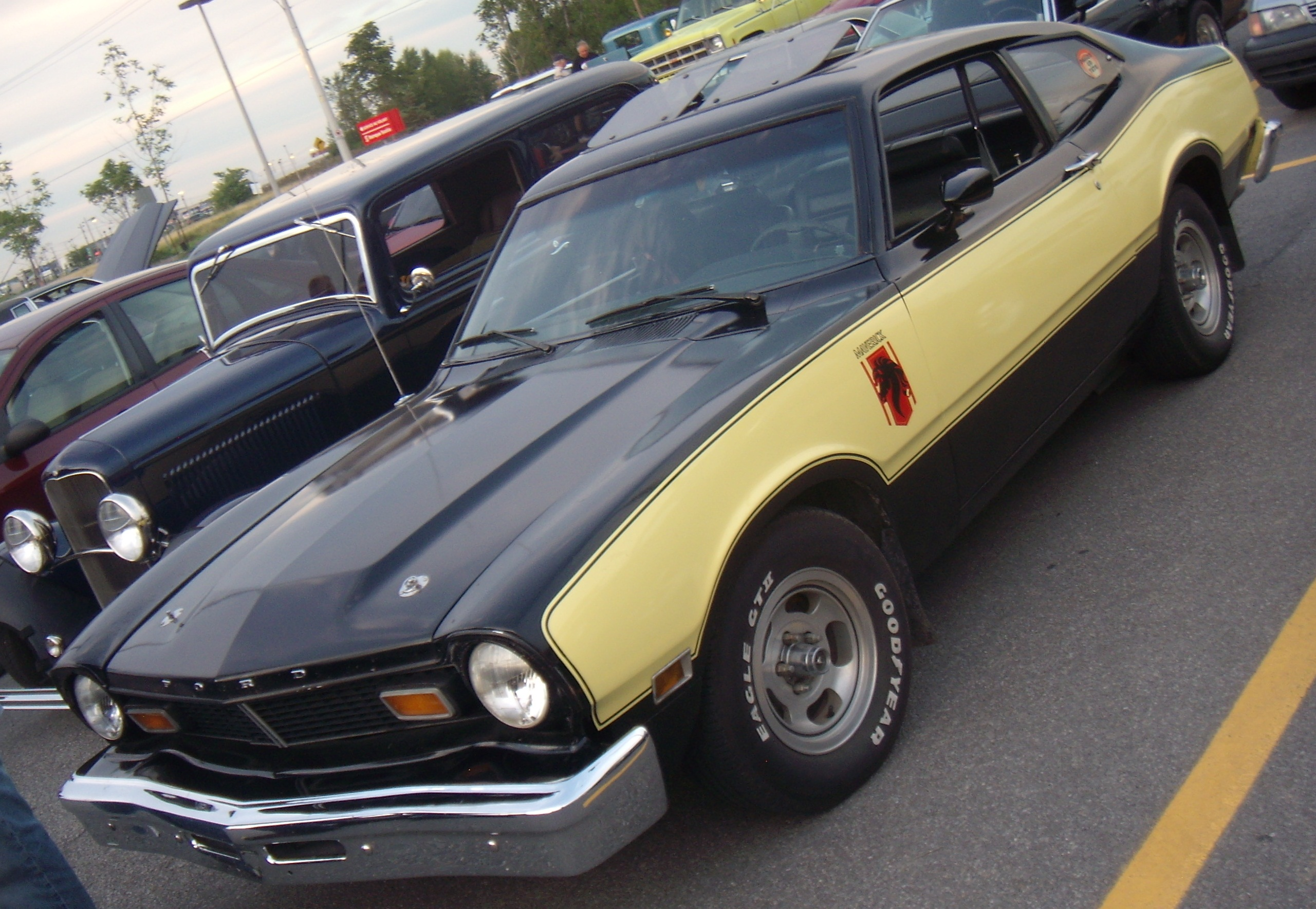
Clockwise from top left: 1971 Ford Maverick Grabber, 1973 Ford Maverick Grabber, 1973 Ford Maverick four-door (LDO trim), 1976 Ford Maverick Stallion, 1972 Ford Maverick Sprint, 1972 Ford Maverick two-door (LDO trim),

When the Ford Maverick was introduced, the model line was sold as a single trim line. For two-door coupes, the Maverick Grabber was introduced, aligning the model line with the sportier appearance of the Mustang. Conversely, the Luxury Decor Option (LDO) trim package added premium trim and features.

The 1972 Maverick Sprint and 1976 Maverick Stallion were appearance packages, shared with both the Mustang (Mustang II for Stallion) and the Pinto.

=== Grabber (1970-1975) ===
Introduced during the 1970 model year, the Grabber trim was designed to portray the model line as a sportier vehicle (primarily in appearance). Distinguished by its black grille (relocating the front turn signals between the headlamps), the Grabber featured bolder exterior colors (Brite Yellow, Grabber Yellow, Vermilion, Grabber Green, Grabber Blue) and contrasting tape stripes. Sharing its powertrain lineup with the standard-trim Maverick, the Grabber was also fitted with wider tires and wheels, a decklid spoiler, and a 3-spoke steering wheel.

For 1971, the Maverick Grabber became a freestanding trim level for two-door coupes; the exterior was fitted with a dual-intake hood and bolder exterior designs for 1972. For 1973, the model-specific hood was dropped, though the Grabber was fitted with an upgraded suspension system; for 1974, the decklid spoiler was removed as a feature. For 1976, the Maverick Grabber was dropped from the model line, with the Maverick Stallion taking its place.

=== Luxury Decor Option (LDO) (1972-1975) ===
Introduced in the spring of 1972, the Luxury Decor Option was an option package intended to offer premium design features with the Maverick. Offered with both two-door and four-door Mavericks, the LDO option featured reclining bucket seats in a soft vinyl material, plush carpeting, wood-grained instrument panel trim, radial tires with body-color deluxe wheel covers, and a vinyl roof. Alongside its standard vinyl roof, the 1973 LDO Maverick was externally distinguished by grille-mounted turn signals. For 1976, the LDO option was dropped, as Ford split the option into separate Interior and Exterior Decor packages.

=== Sprint (1972) ===
For 1972, Ford offered a Sprint option package for the Maverick (and the Mustang and Pinto). Largely an appearance package, the Maverick Sprint was styled with two-tone white and blue paint and red pinstripes, including a stylized US flag shield; the interior was color-coordinated with the exterior design. The option was a commemorative design, reflecting US participation in the 1972 Olympics and was dropped for 1973.

=== Stallion (1976) ===
Introduced for 1976 to replace the Grabber, the Maverick Stallion served as the performance-oriented option package. Distinguished by its black-painted upper and lower body (contrasting with Silver Metallic, Polar White, Bright Red, Bright Yellow and Silver Blue Glow paint), the Stallion option was designed with black-painted exterior trim (limiting chrome to the wheels, door handles, and bumpers). Though available with all three engines, the Stallion was fitted with heavier-duty suspension over the standard Maverick. Offered alongside corresponding versions of the Pinto and Mustang II, the Stallion option package was dropped for 1977.

== Production ==
1970–1977 Ford Maverick (North America) production totals
Model year	2-door	Grabber (2-door)	4-door	Total units
1969½ (1970)	127,833			127,833
1970	451,081			578,914 (full model year)
1971	159,726	38,963	73,208	271,897
1972	145,931	35,347	73,686	254,964
1973	148,943	32,350	110,382	291,675
1974	139,818	23,502	137,728	301,048
1975	63,404	8,473	90,695	162,572
1976	60,611		79,076	139,687
1977	40,086		58,420	98,506
Total production				2,105,263

== South America ==
From 1973 to 1979, the Ford Maverick was produced in Brazil. Serving as the replacement for the Ford Aero (designed by Willys in 1954), Ford Brasil marketed the Maverick as a mid-size car, slotted between the Ford Corcel (a rebodied variant of the Renault 12) and the Ford Galaxie (a locally-produced version of the 1965-1968 generation). Intended as a competitor for the Chevrolet Opala, the model line was chosen over the Ford Taunus, as the chassis could be fitted with the engine from the Aero; the Maverick was also designed with a leaf-sprung solid rear axle. While offered as the same two-door coupe and four-door sedan (introduced in 1974) as its American namesake, Ford Brasil made several design changes to the vehicle. In place of a Ford-produced inline-6, the Maverick was fitted with the 184.1 cu in (3.0 L) Hurricane inline-6 of the Aero 3000; the Maverick also inherited the manual steering system from its predecessor. Imported from the US, the 302 V8 was offered as an option. Alongside a column-shift 3-speed manual, the model line was offered with a 4-speed floor shift manual (exclusive to Brazil), and a 3-speed automatic (offered with the V8 engine). The Brazilian-market Maverick was sold in three trims: Super, Super Luxo (adding a carpeted floor, bucket seats, and a radio), and GT (loosely based on the Grabber). Externally, the Brazil-produced Maverick retained the front and rear bumpers used prior to 1973; the Maverick nameplate badging was styled without a Longhorn cattle emblem (in Brazil, the feature was associated with infidelity). For 1975, the inline-6 engine was dropped in favor of a locally-produced 2.3 L OHC inline-4 (increasing fuel economy by 25% over the 3.0 L engine). 1977 brought the "Fase II" update; along with recalibrated chassis tuning (coinciding with standard radial tires), the Super and Super Luxo became the Maverick 4 (in another change, the GT was now available with both engines). For 1978, the LDO trim was introduced (effectively replacing the Super Luxo). Following the 1979 model year, Ford Brasil discontinued the Maverick, with the Corcel II and Del Rey taking over its role. In total, 106,108 Ford Mavericks were produced in Brazil. For 1978 and 1979, a 5-door Ford Maverick station was offered as a Ford-licensed dealer conversion; approximately 200 were produced.

1974 Ford Maverick GT

1975 Ford Maverick Super (standard trim) four-door sedan

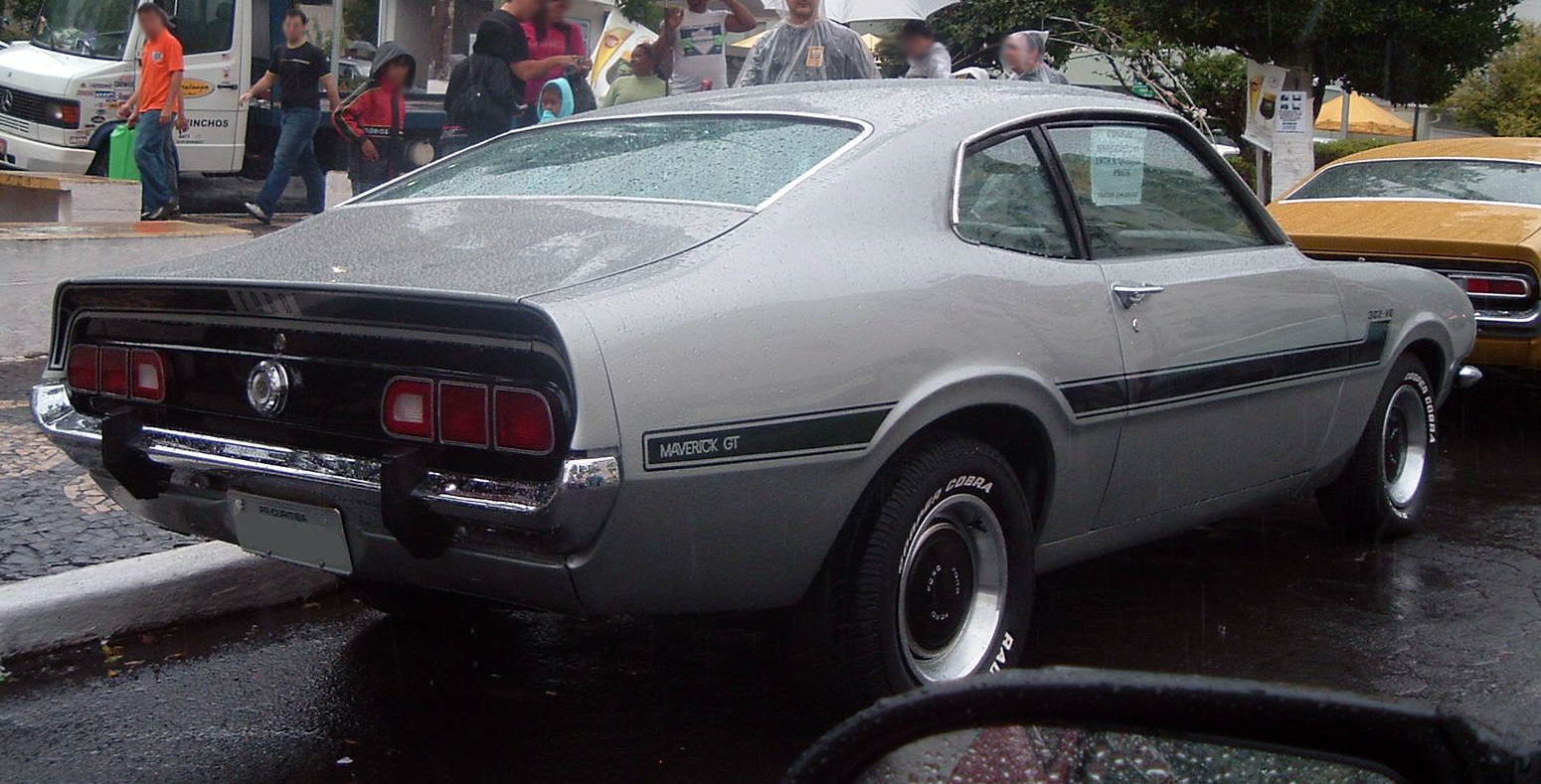
1978 Ford Maverick GT (showing facelift taillamps)

== See also ==
- Mercury Comet – fifth generation (1971–1977)
- Nissan Patrol for the Australian Ford Maverick of 1988 to 1994
- Nissan Terrano II for the European Ford Maverick of 1993 to 1999
- Ford Escape for the European Ford Maverick of 2001 to 2004
