= Ford Fairmont =

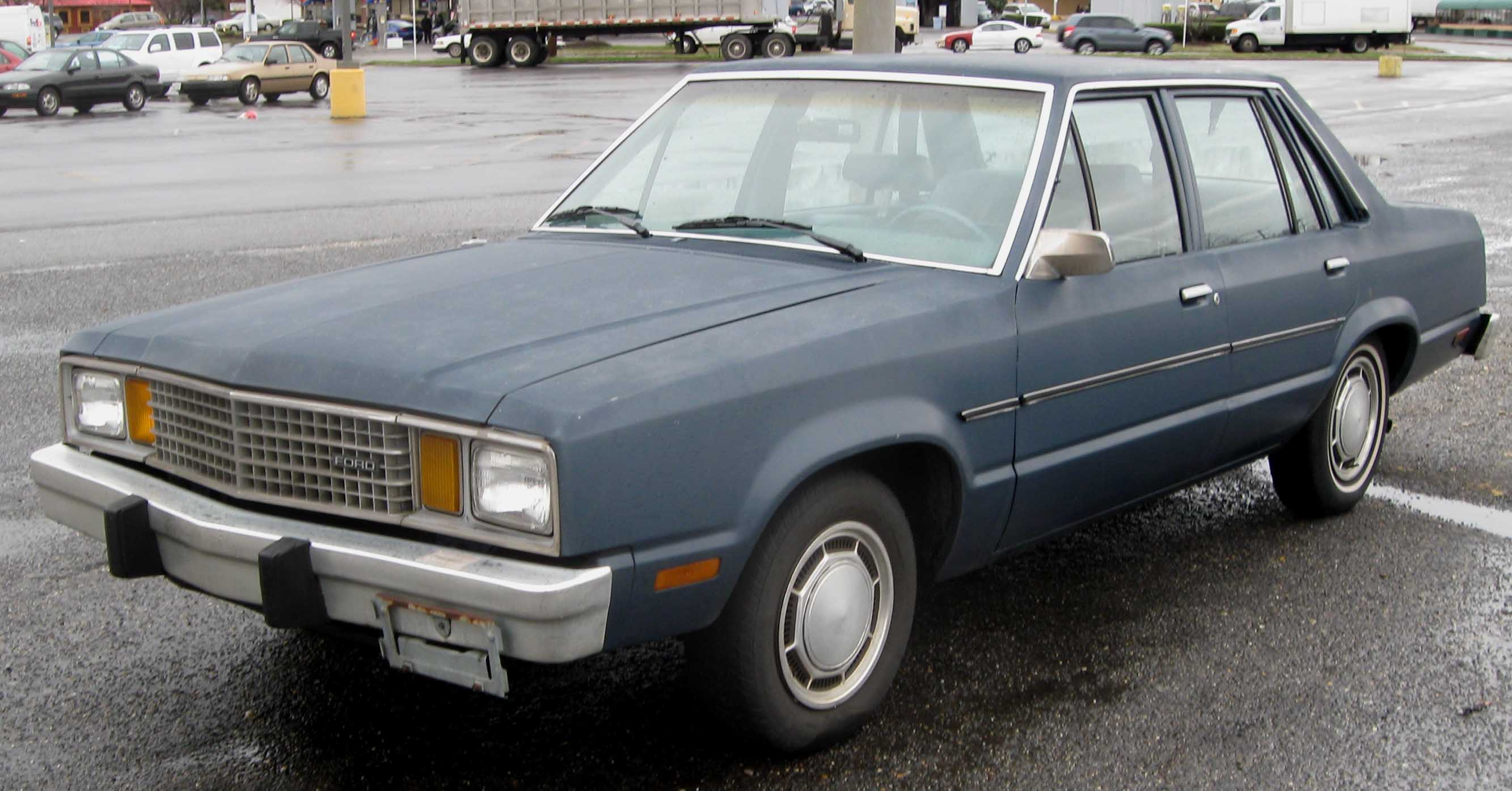
- 1981 Ford Fairmont four-door sedan

Overview
- Manufacturer: Ford Motor Company
- Also called: Mercury Zephyr; Ford Elite II (Mexico); Ford Zephyr (Venezuela); Ford Futura (Venezuela)
- Production: 1977–1983
- Model years: 1978–1983
- Assembly: United States: Hapeville, Georgia (Atlanta Assembly); Claycomo, Missouri (Kansas City Assembly); Mahwah, New Jersey (Mahwah Assembly); Canada: St. Thomas, Ontario (St. Thomas Assembly); Venezuela: Valencia, Carabobo (Valencia Assembly); Mexico: Mexico City (La Villa Assembly Plant)

Body and chassis
- Class: Compact
- Body style: 2-door coupe 2-door notchback sedan 4-door sedan 5-door station wagon
- Layout: FR layout
- Platform: Ford Fox platform
- Related: Mercury Zephyr; Ford Mustang; Mercury Capri; Ford Durango

Powertrain
- Engine: 140 cu in (2.3 L) Lima I4; 140 cu in (2.3 L) turbo Lima I4; 200 cu in (3.3 L) Thriftpower Six I6; 255 cu in (4.18 L) Windsor V8; 302 cu in (4.95 L) Windsor V8
- Transmission: 3-speed manual 4-speed manual 3-speed C3 automatic 3-speed C4 automatic 3-speed C5 automatic

Dimensions
- Wheelbase: 105.5 in (2,680 mm)
- Length: 193.8 in (4,920 mm)
- Width: 71.0 in (1,800 mm)
- Height: 53.5 in (1,360 mm)
- Curb weight: 2,747–2,959 pounds (1,246–1,342 kg)

Chronology
- Predecessor: Ford Maverick
- Successor: Ford Tempo

The Ford Fairmont is a model line of compact cars manufactured and marketed by Ford for the 1978 to 1983 model years. The successor of the Ford Maverick, the Fairmont marked the third generation of compact sedans marketed by Ford in North America. Initially positioned between the Pinto and Granada, the Fairmont was later marketed between the Ford Escort and Ford LTD. In contrast to its predecessor (only offered as a two-door or four-door sedan), the line was offered as a two-door notchback sedan, two-door coupe, four-door sedan, and five-door station wagon. Though never marketed by Lincoln, Mercury marketed a rebadged divisional counterpart of the Fairmont as the Mercury Zephyr.

As the first models to use Ford's new rear-wheel drive Ford Fox platform, replacing models based on the Ford Falcon, the Fairmont and Zephyr would ultimately share the platform with twelve other model lines across the Ford, Mercury, and Lincoln brands. Though the Fairmont itself was manufactured across only six model years, the Fox platform would continue for another two decades, underpinning vehicles (in updated form) through model year 2004.

Throughout its production, Ford manufactured the Fairmont at numerous facilities across North America. On November 15, 1977, a Fairmont (a 1978 Fairmont Futura coupe) became the 100 millionth vehicle assembled by Ford Motor Company. For 1984, the model line was replaced with the front-wheel drive Ford Tempo.

== Background and development ==
In April 1973, the American EPA released its comprehensive list of fuel economy results. In October of the same year, the 1973 oil crisis started. At the time, Ford's North American product line included the subcompact Pinto and Mustang II, and the compact Maverick, but replacements for all of these models would soon be needed. At the same time, Ford of England's Cortina line was in need of refreshing, as was the Taunus model built by Ford of Germany.

Changes were also happening at Ford's executive level, as William O. Bourke, ex-chairman of Ford of Europe and one-time managing director of Ford of Australia, was made executive vice president of North American Operations and Robert Alexander, previously with Ford of Europe as vice president in charge of car development, moved to same position in the States.

Hal Sperlich was vice-president of product planning and research at Ford. A proponent of downsizing, Sperlich conceived of a "world car" that could be sold in both Europe and North America as a solution to the needs of the various divisions.

Some sources suggest that the "Fox" name was borrowed from the Audi 80, sold in the US and Australia as the "Audi Fox" beginning in May 1973, because Ford's executives considered the 80 their class-leading subcompact competitor, and made it the baseline reference for the new platform. Another reports that Ford used the Fox name in an internal report as early as February 1973, making it less likely to have been borrowed from the German model. In December 1973, Ford President Lee Iacocca formally approved development of the Fox platform.

Although the Fairmont would be the first Fox-based car to reach the market, development was guided by an anticipated sport coupe to be based on the new platform.

Development started in early 1973 on both a short wheelbase version, to replace the Pinto/Cortina/Taunus lines, and a long-wheelbase version, that would become the Fairmont. By 1974, the difficulties faced in meeting the conflicting regulatory requirements in different markets and differing production methods used by the various divisions had killed the world car idea. In 1975, North American Automobile Operations took over development of the Fox platform from Sperlich's Product Planning and Research group.

The first running Fox/Fairmont prototype was a modified Cortina with a MacPherson strut and torsion bar front suspension.

A 1980 Fairmont station wagon converted to an electric vehicle by Electric Vehicles Associates Inc. and renamed the EVA Current Fare Wagon was evaluated by the US Department of Energy from March 1980 to November 1981.

== Model overview ==
The Ford Fairmont was launched in August 1977 as a 1978 model. The name was first used by Ford in 1965 for the Australian Fairmont, an upscale trim level model of the Ford Falcon (XP), and had also been used in the South African market in 1969.

=== Chassis specifications ===
The Fairmont is based on the rear-wheel drive Ford Fox platform, using steel unibody construction. The independent front suspension comprised lower lateral arms, MacPherson struts, and helical-wound coil springs. In what Ford called a modified or hybrid MacPherson strut system, the coil springs were mounted separately from the struts rather than concentrically, being located between the lower arm and front cross-member. A front anti-roll bar was standard equipment. The rear suspension used a solid axle suspended on coil springs and vertically mounted dampers. The axle was located by four links; two lower trailing arms and two sharply angled upper control arms.

The Fairmont has power-assisted brakes, with 10.0 inch vented front discs and 9.0 x 1.8 inch rear drums. Standard wheels and tires were 14x5.0 and DR78-14 respectively. Steering was by a rack and pinion system with 3.2 turns lock-to-lock.

=== Powertrain ===
For its entire production run, the standard engine for the Fairmont was a 140 cu in (2.3 L) inline-4 (shared with the Pinto). Initially producing 88 hp, following several revisions, output rose to 90 hp by 1983. The 2.3 L engine was initially paired with a 3-speed manual (replaced by a 4-speed in 1979), with a 3-speed automatic offered as an option. For 1980 only, a 120 hp turbocharged version of the 2.3 L engine (shared with the Mustang Cobra) was available in Fairmont sedans and coupes. Examples with the turbocharged engine were distinguished by a center-mounted hood "power bulge".

As an option, a 200 cu in (3.3 L) inline-6 (shared with the Maverick and Granada) was offered from 1978 to 1983 model years. While offering less horsepower than the 2.3 L inline-4, the 3.3 L inline-6 produced significantly more torque. For 1978, the standard transmission was a 3-speed manual (replaced by a 4-speed for 1979); a 3-speed automatic was offered as an option.

For 1978 to 1981 model years, the Fairmont was offered with two different Windsor V8 engines (shared with mid-size and full-size Ford vehicles). For 1978 and 1979, a 139 hp 302 cu in (4.9 L) V8 was offered, available with a 4-speed manual transmission for the 1979 model year only. It was replaced by a 115 hp 255 cu in (4.2 L) V8 for 1980 and 1981. The 255 engine was paired exclusively with a 3-speed automatic transmission.

| Engine family | Year(s) | Bore x Stroke | Displacement | Valvetrain | Induction | Carburetion | Horsepower | Torque |
|---|---|---|---|---|---|---|---|---|
| Lima Inline-4 | 1978–1981 | 3.78 in × 3.13 in (96.04 mm × 79.4 mm) | 140 cu in (2,301 cc) | SOHC | Naturally aspirated | 2-barrel | 88 hp at 4800 rpm | 118 lb-ft at 2800 rpm |
| Lima Inline-4 | 1982 | 3.78 in × 3.13 in (96.04 mm × 79.4 mm) | 140 cu in (2,301 cc) | SOHC | Naturally aspirated | 2-barrel | 86 hp at 4600 rpm 92 hp at 4600 rpm | 117 lb-ft at 2600 rpm 119 lb-ft at 4600 rpm |
| Lima Inline-4 | 1983 | 3.78 in × 3.13 in (96.04 mm × 79.4 mm) | 140 cu in (2,301 cc) | SOHC | Naturally aspirated | 1-barrel | 90 hp at 4600 rpm | 122 lb-ft at 2600 rpm |
| Lima Inline-4 | 1980 | 3.78 in × 3.13 in (96.04 mm × 79.4 mm) | 140 cu in (2,301 cc) | SOHC | Turbocharged | 2-barrel (Draw-through) | 120 hp at 5400 rpm | 145 lb-ft at 3000 rpm |
| Thriftpower Inline-6 | 1978–1979 | 3.69 in × 3.13 in (93.6 mm × 79.4 mm) | 200 cu in (3,278 cc) | OHV | Naturally aspirated | 1-barrel | 85 hp at 3600 rpm | 154 lb-ft at 1600 rpm |
| Thriftpower Inline-6 | 1980–1983 | 3.69 in × 3.13 in (93.6 mm × 79.4 mm) | 200 cu in (3,278 cc) | OHV | Naturally aspirated | 1-barrel | 91 hp at 3800 rpm | 160 lb-ft at 1600 rpm |
| Windsor V8 | 1978–1979 | 4.00 in × 3.00 in (101.6 mm × 76.2 mm) | 302 cu in (4,942 cc) | OHV | Naturally aspirated | 2-barrel | 139 hp at 3600 rpm | 250 lb-ft at 1600 rpm |
| Windsor V8 | 1980 | 3.68 in × 3.00 in (93.5 mm × 76.2 mm) | 255 cu in (4,183 cc) | OHV | Naturally aspirated | 2-barrel | 119 hp at 3800 rpm | 194 lb-ft at 2200 rpm |
| Windsor V8 | 1981 | 3.68 in × 3.00 in (93.5 mm × 76.2 mm) | 255 cu in (4,183 cc) | OHV | Naturally aspirated | 2-barrel | 115 hp at 3400 rpm | 195 lb-ft at 2200 rpm |

=== Body design ===
The Fairmont debuted for 1978 with three body configurations; a two-door sedan, a four-door sedan, and a five-door station wagon. The wagon was available in both base Fairmont and higher Fairmont Squire trims. Late in the 1978 model year (December 1977), a two-door coupe was introduced; named Futura, the name revived the sporty trim level used for the 1960s Ford Falcon.

The Fairmont Futura was developed from a Fairmont-based Thunderbird design proposal from March 1976. The Futura was a two-door coupe distinguished by a model-specific roofline that featured a wrapover B-pillar similar to the 1977–1979 Ford Thunderbird but without opera windows. The rear fascia was also given its own wrap-around taillamp design. To further differentiate the Futura from the standard Fairmont, the coupe was fitted with the 4-headlight fascia from the Zephyr, and a cross-hatched grille was used in place of the standard eggcrate grille. For the 1980 model year Ford expanded the Futura nameplate to include a four-door sedan and added a Futura station wagon for 1981.

For 1981, the exterior trim was revised with the addition of a slim molding strip along the side exterior panels; convenience equipment was also increased. For 1982, several model revisions were made. Ford moved the Fairmont station wagon to the Granada model line and the Futura trim became the sole trim, expanding it to the two-door sedan for the first time. Effectively, this standardized the four-headlight front fascia (of the Futura coupe and Mercury Zephyr).

For 1983, Ford introduced an "S" model of the Fairmont Futura as a base trim. Sold only as a sedan and only with the 2.3 L engine, the radio and right-hand mirror of the Futura S became options.

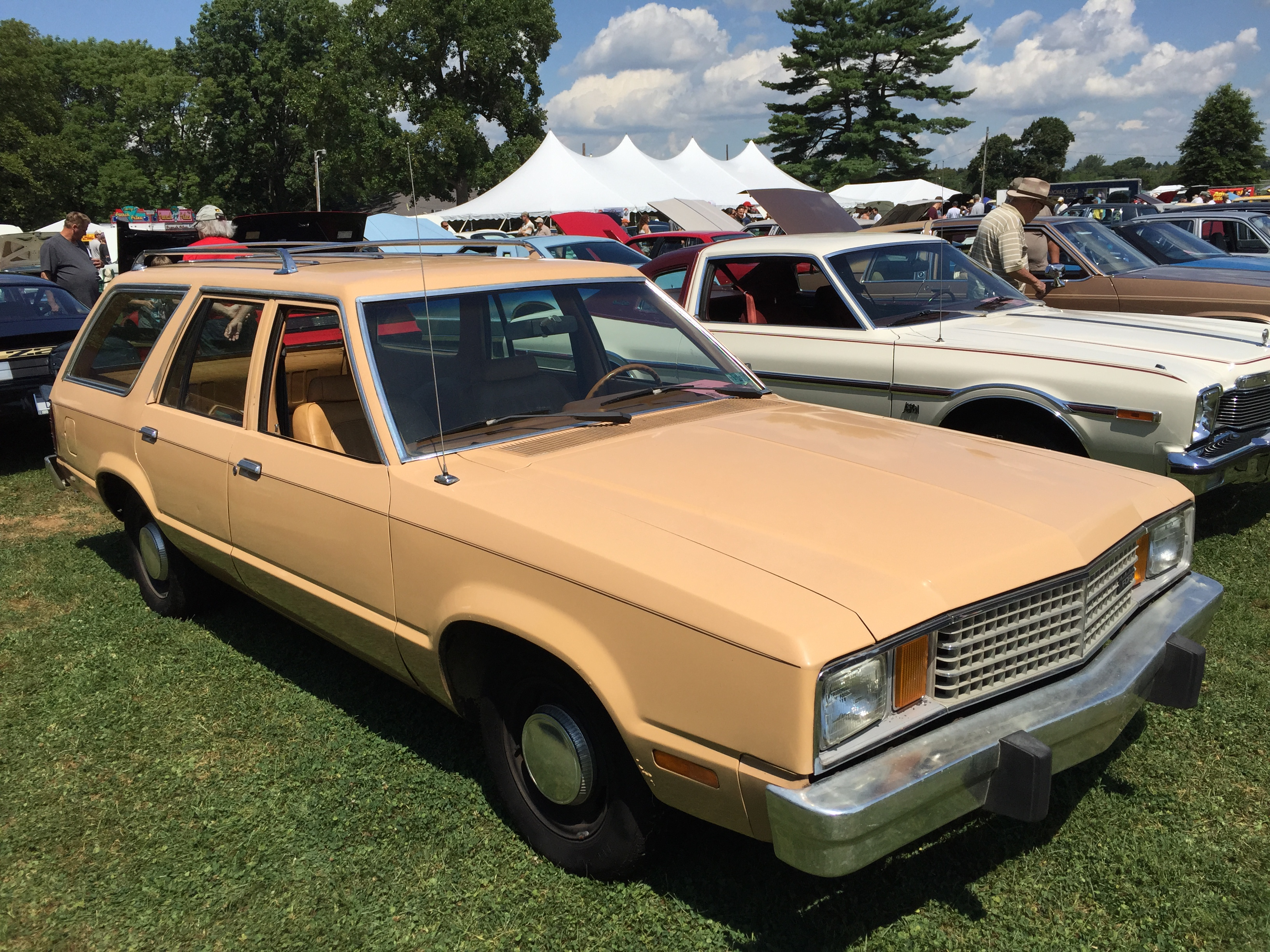
1978–1980 Ford Fairmont Wagon

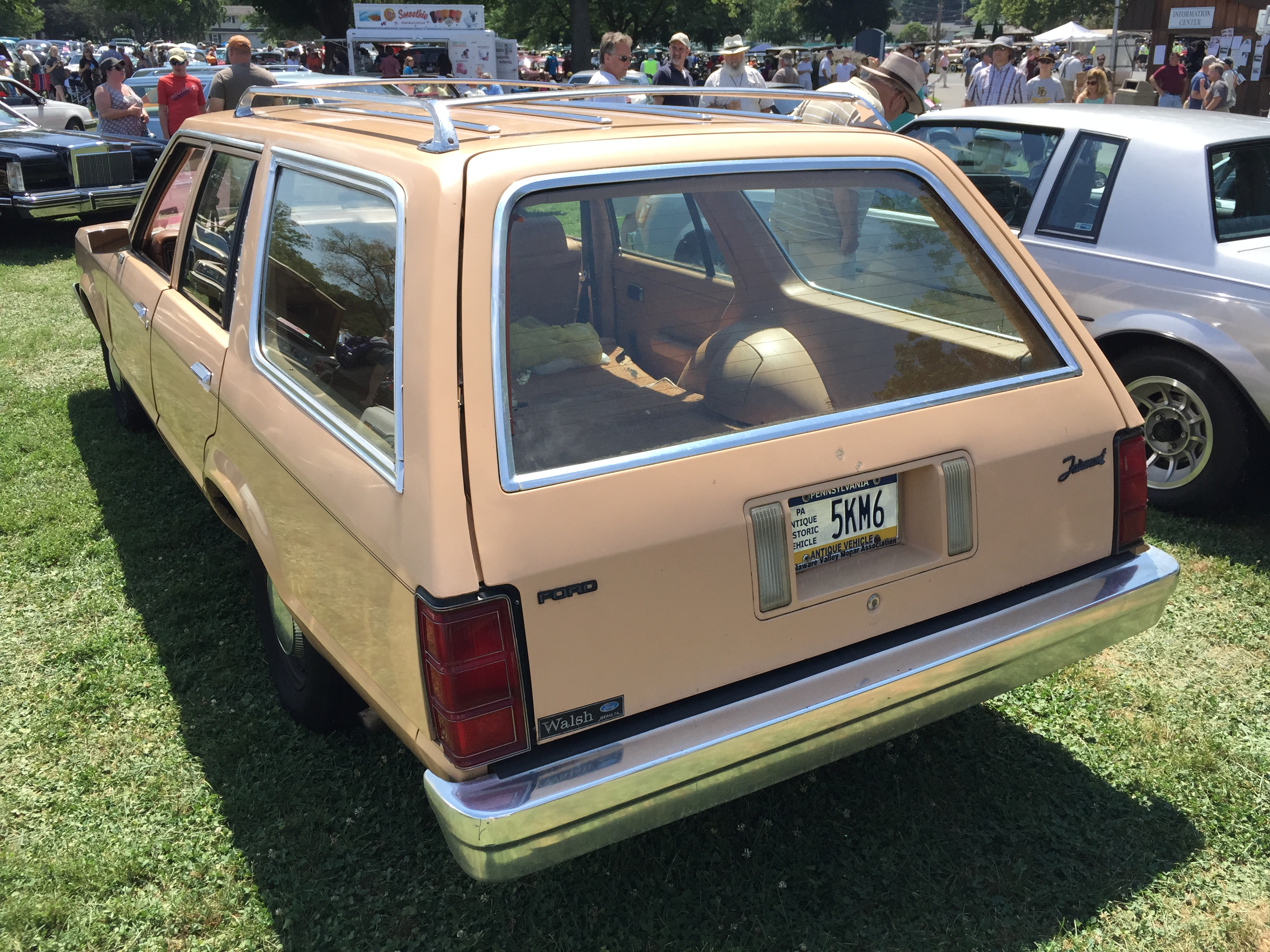
1978–1980 Ford Fairmont Wagon

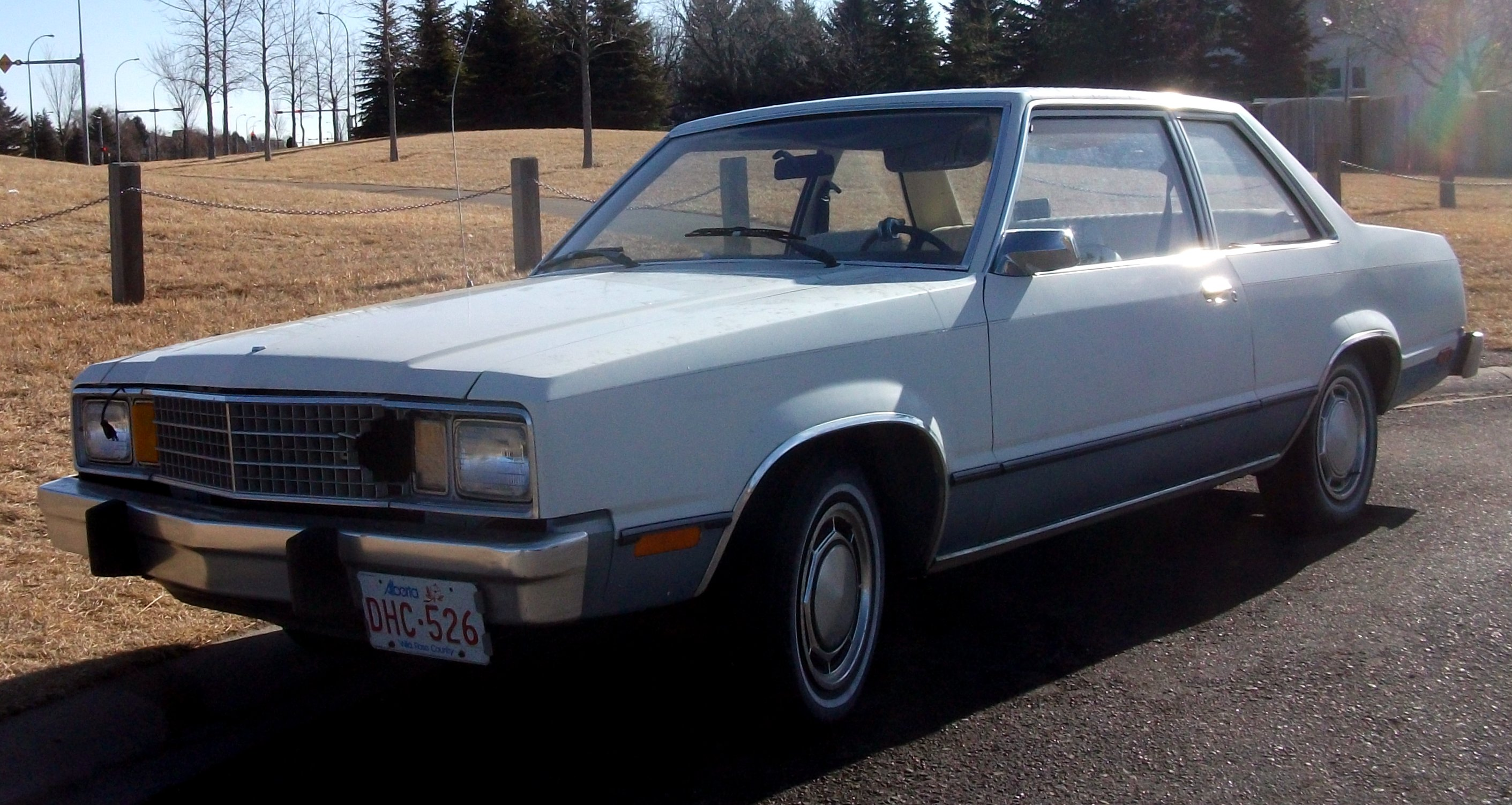
1978–1980 Ford Fairmont two-door sedan

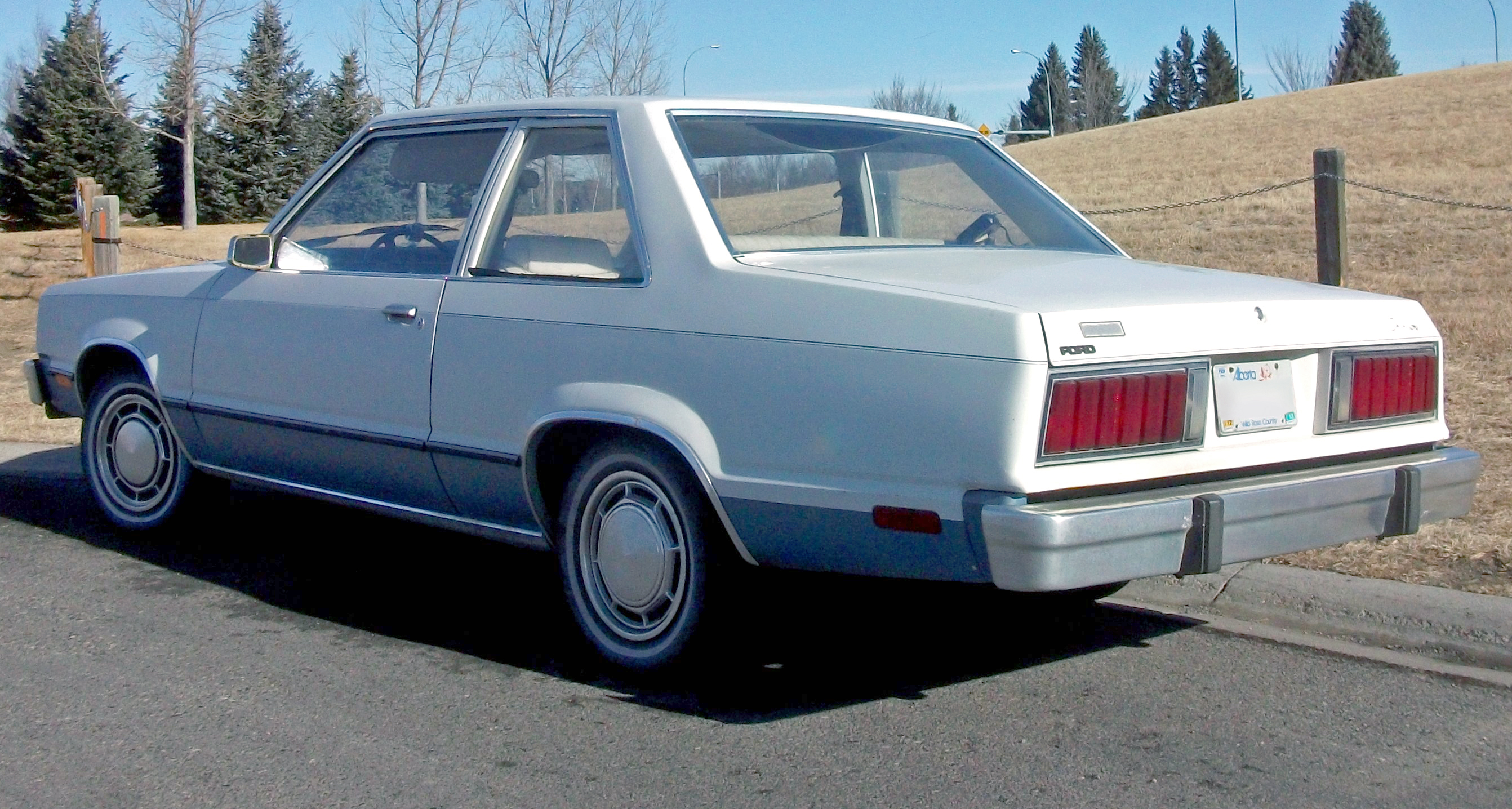
1978–1980 Ford Fairmont two-door sedan

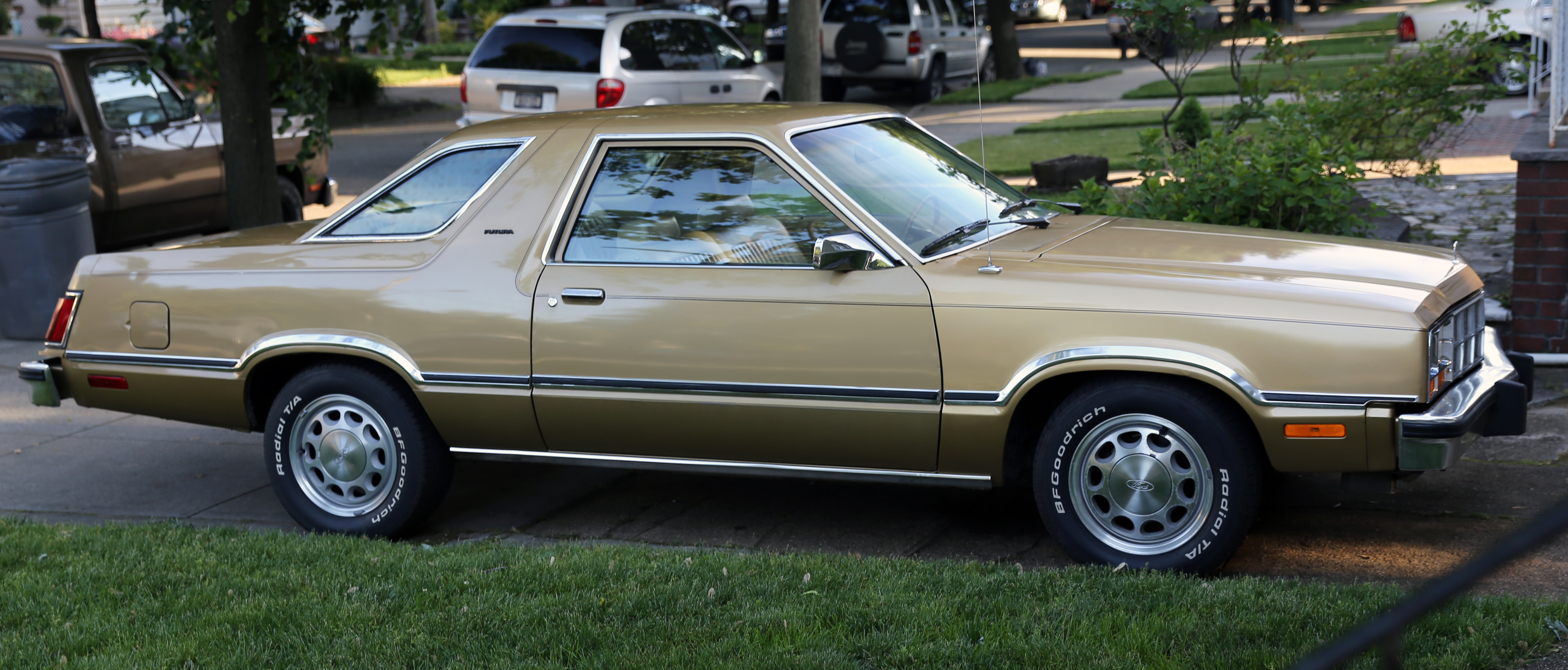
1980 Ford Fairmont Futura 2-Door

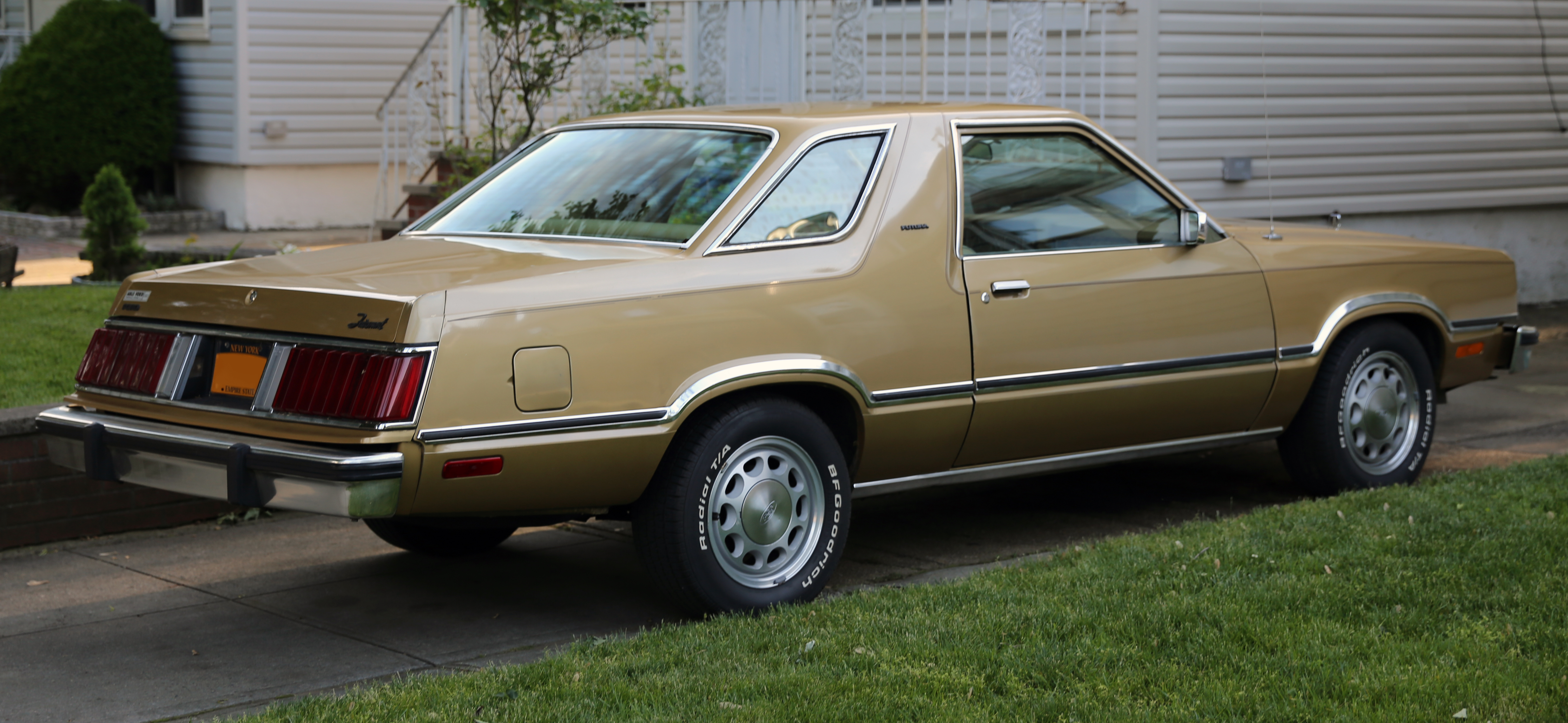
1980 Ford Fairmont Futura 2-Door

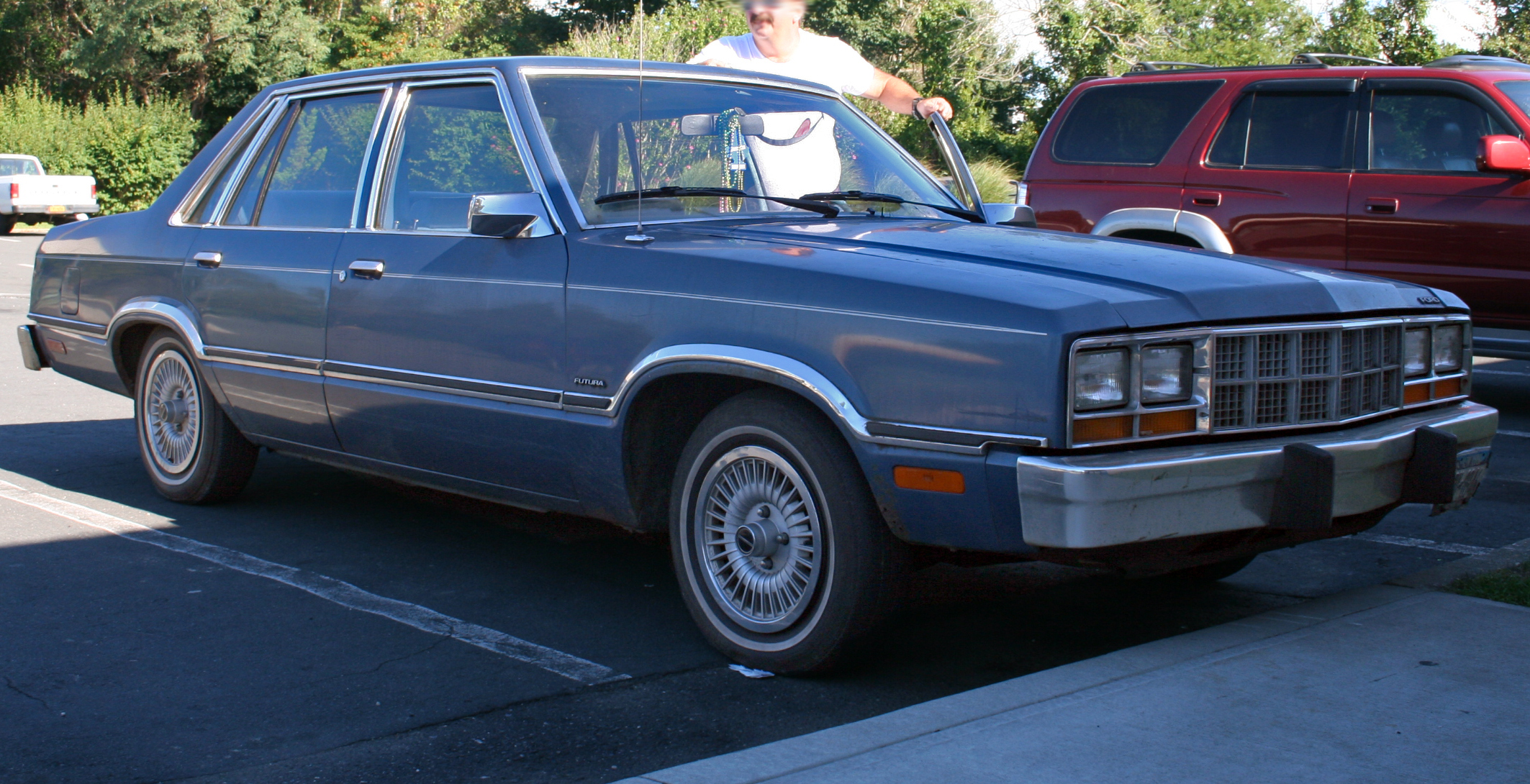
1981–1983 Ford Fairmont Futura 4-Door with the twin headlight grille

== Discontinuation ==
During the early 1980s, Ford undertook a major revision of its product ranges. Following the 1981 introduction of the Ford Escort, the automaker sought to expand its use of front-wheel drive across the compact and mid-size segment; the rear-wheel drive Fox platform remained in production, used mainly for performance and luxury vehicles (the Mustang, Thunderbird, their Lincoln-Mercury counterparts, but also the Ford LTD/Mercury Marquis).

Released for the 1984 model year, the Ford Tempo and Mercury Topaz replaced the Fairmont/Zephyr. An extended-wheelbase sedan counterpart of the Escort/Lynx, the front-wheel drive Tempo and Topaz followed the Thunderbird in using aerodynamic-influenced exterior styling. As the Fairmont was ending its model cycle in 1983, it became the only Ford model in North America to retain the "FORD" lettering in place of the Ford Blue Oval emblem.

The same one-piece lift-up tailgate designed for the Fairmont wagon was also used on the fourth generation Australian XD, XE and XF series Ford Falcon and Fairmont wagons, which were produced until 1988.

Production Figures:

Ford Fairmont Production Figures
| | 2-door Sedan | Futura Coupe | 4-door Sedan | Wagon | Yearly Total |
|---|---|---|---|---|---|
| 1978 | 78,776 | 116,966 | 136,849 | 128,390 | 460,981 |
| 1979 | 54,798 | 106,065 | 133,813 | 100,691 | 395,367 |
| 1980 | 45,074 | 51,878 | 148,424 | 77,035 | 322,411 |
| 1981 | 23,066 | 24,197 | 104,883 | 59,154 | 211,300 |
| 1982 | - | 26,073 | 101,666 | - | 127,739 |
| 1983 | - | 11,546 | 69,287 | - | 80,833 |
| Total | 201,714 | 336,725 | 694,922 | 365,270 | 1,598,631 |

*Futura sedans and Futura wagons are included in the Sedan and Wagon figures

== Mercury Zephyr ==
From the 1978 to 1983 model years, the Mercury Zephyr served as the Mercury counterpart of the Ford Fairmont, replacing the Maverick-based Comet. The third vehicle to use the nameplate within Ford Motor Company, the Mercury Zephyr shares its nameplate with the 1936–1940 Lincoln-Zephyr and the 1950–1972 Ford Zephyr (produced by Ford of Britain). Within the Mercury line, the Zephyr was slotted between the Bobcat (replaced for 1981 by the Lynx) and the Monarch (replaced for 1981 by the Cougar).

Sharing the same model range as the Fairmont, the Zephyr was offered as two-door and four-door sedans, a five-door station wagon, and the two-door "Zephyr Z-7" coupe. At its launch, the Zephyr was externally distinguished by the use of four headlights. The exterior was styled with design elements that were adopted by multiple Mercury product lines during the early 1980s (the Lynx, Capri, Cougar, and Marquis), including a waterfall-style grille, horizontally ribbed taillamps, and (non-functional) front fender vents.

The Zephyr was initially offered in standard, ES (a successor to the ESS trim of the Monarch), and Ghia trims, for 1981, both were replaced by GS trim (the equivalent of Futura on non-coupe Fairmonts). In line with other Mercury station wagons, the model line was offered with a Villager option package, including exterior (simulated) woodgrain trim.

At the beginning of the 1980s, the Zephyr was gradually phased out of the Mercury model line. For 1982, both the 4.2-liter V8 option and the station wagon were moved to the more upscale Cougar model line. As Mercury transitioned its model line to front-wheel drive, the Zephyr was replaced by the Mercury Topaz for the 1984 model year.

Following its use by Mercury, the Zephyr nameplate was briefly reused by Lincoln in 2006. The Lincoln Zephyr mid-size sedan was renamed the Lincoln MKZ for 2007, commencing the Lincoln "MK" model nomenclature.

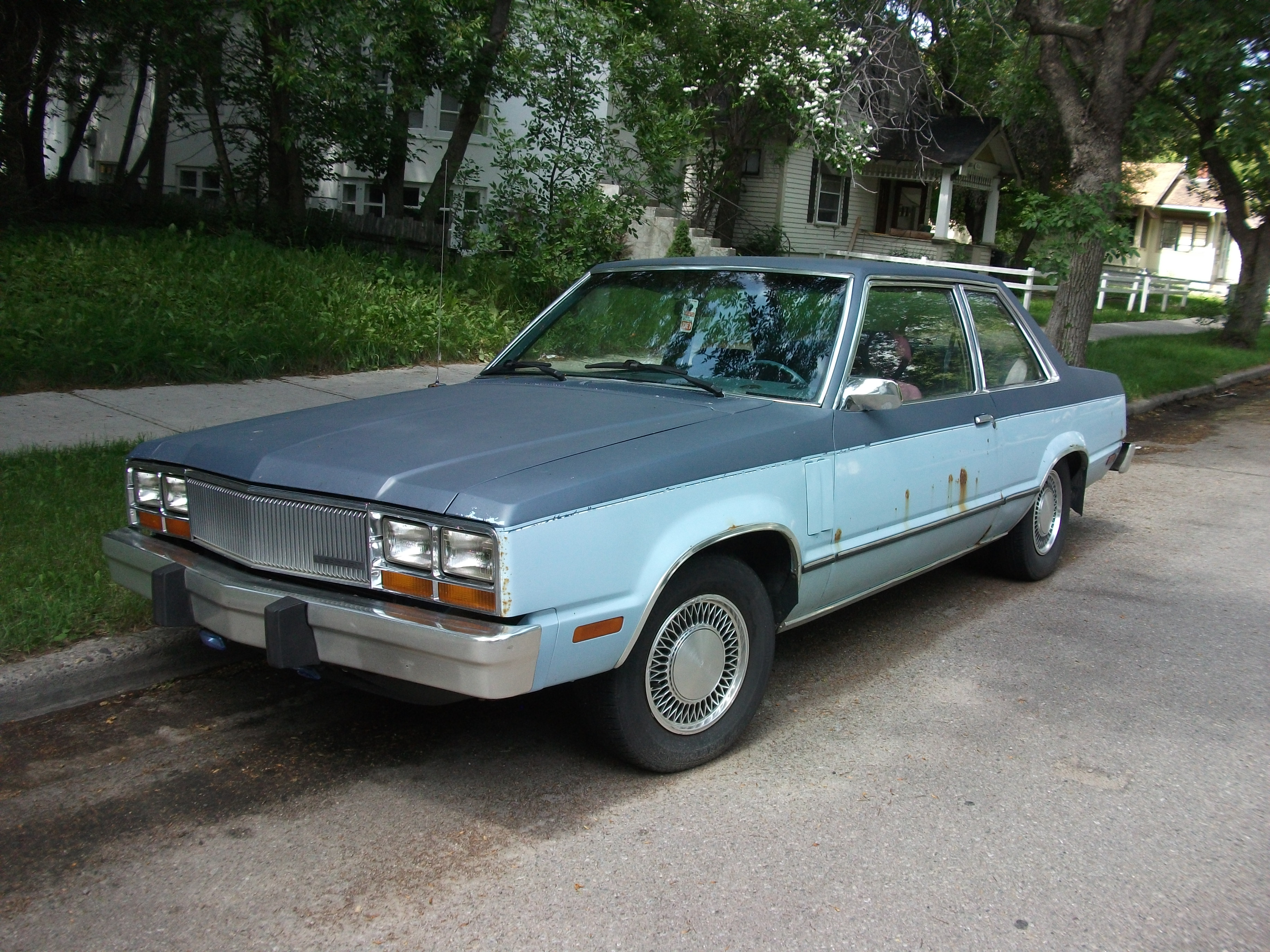
Zephyr two-door sedan

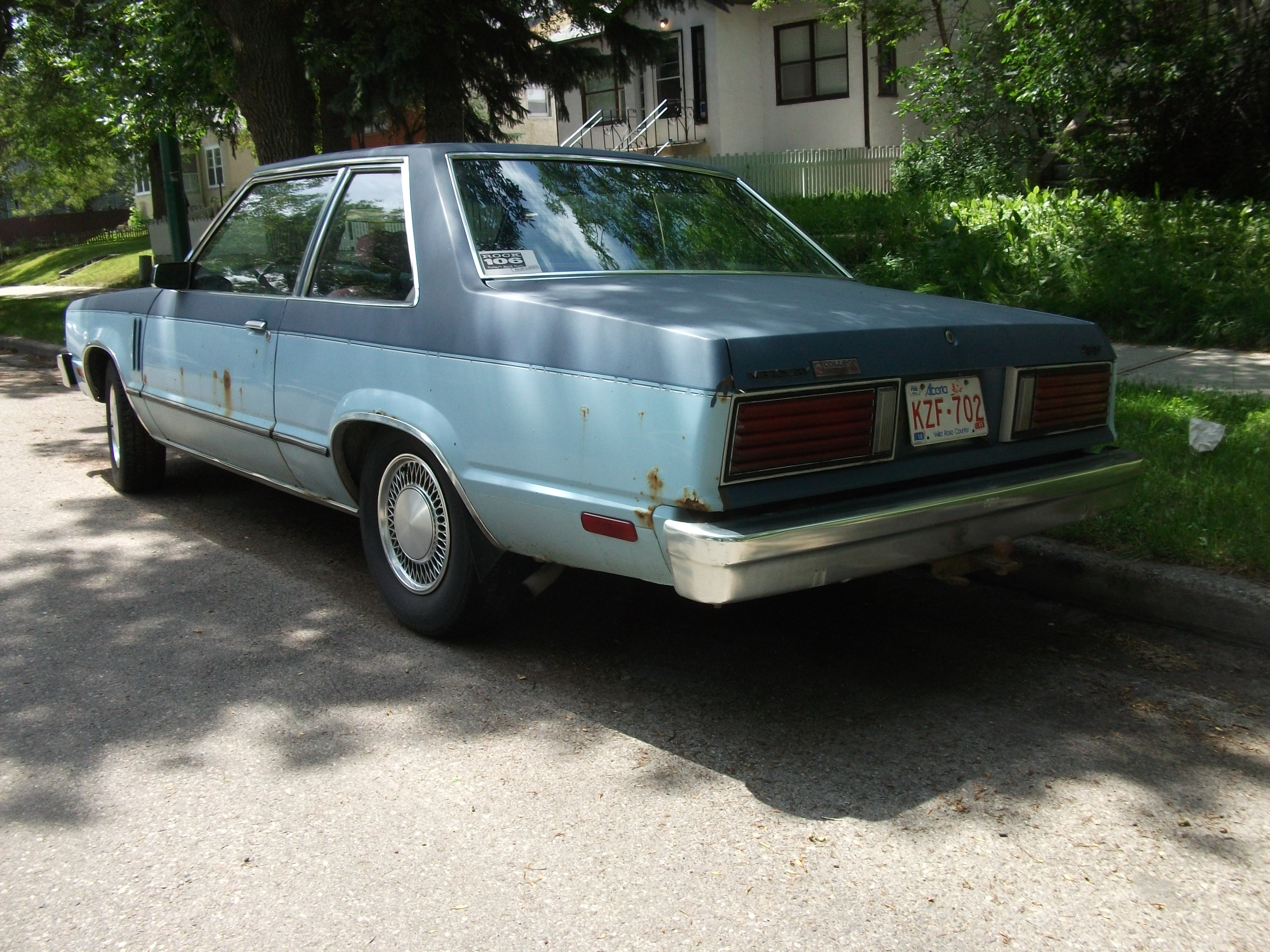
Zephyr two-door sedan rear

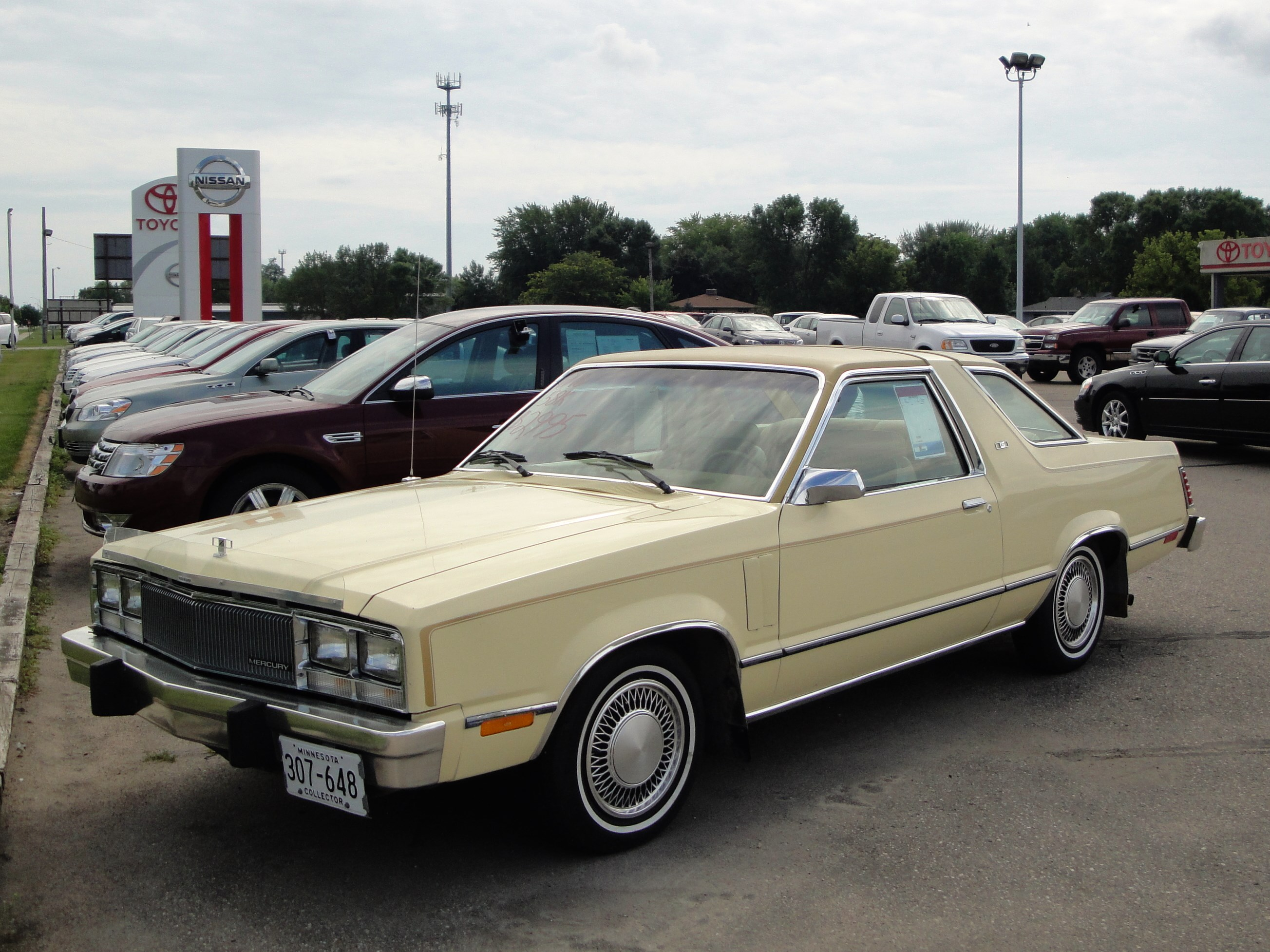
1978 Zephyr Z-7

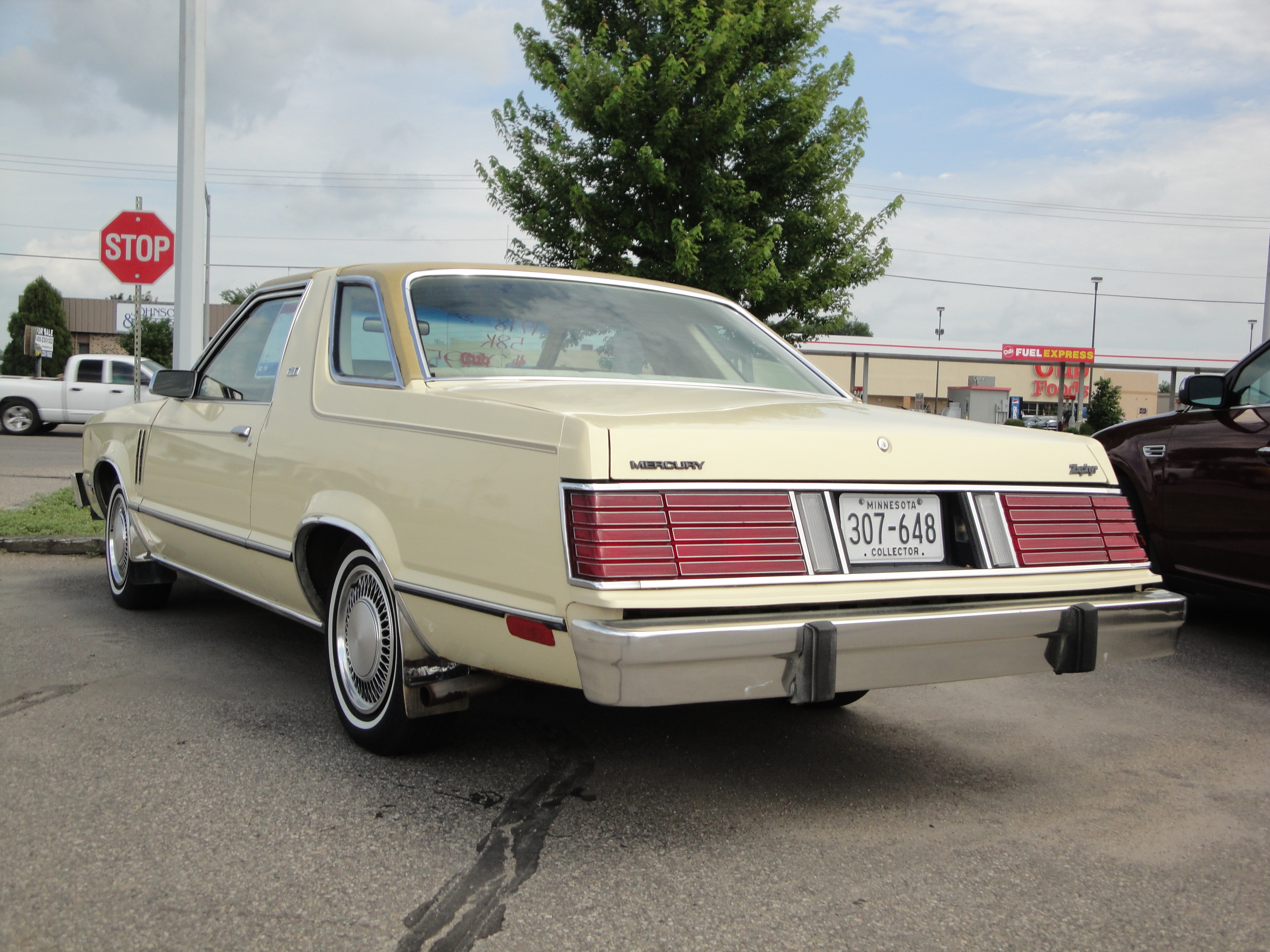
1978 Zephyr Z-7 rear

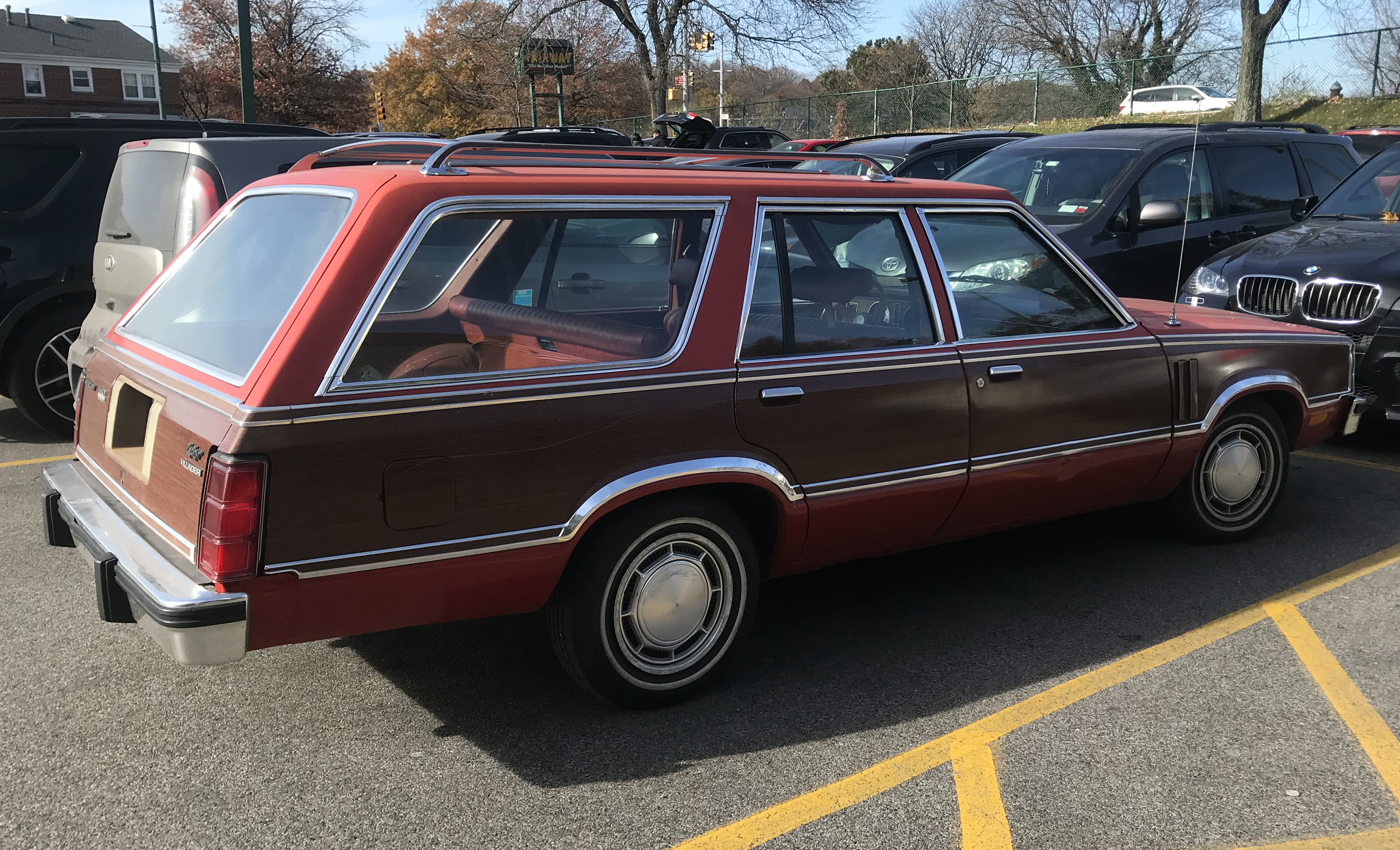
1978 Zephyr Villager

== Variants ==
=== Ford Durango ===
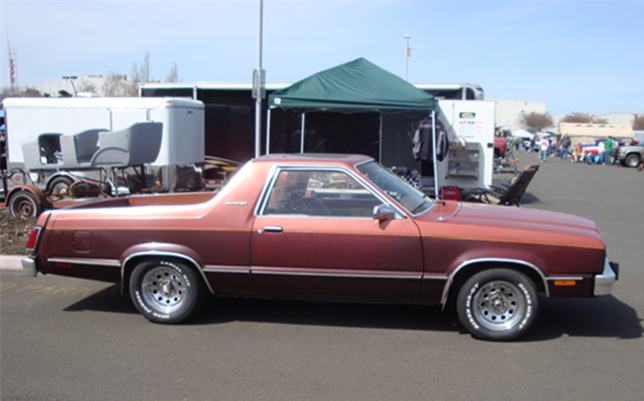
1981 Ford Durango

The Ford Durango was produced by a joint venture between Ford and National Coach Corporation from 1978 to 1981. Based heavily on the Fairmont Futura coupe, the Durango was a two-door, two-seat car-based pickup truck that was intended as a possible replacement for the 1977–1979 Ford Ranchero as well as a competitor to the downsized Chevrolet El Camino/GMC Caballero. Approximately 200 are estimated to have been produced.

=== European Sport Option ===
The European Sport Option was an appearance and suspension package offered in 1978 through 1980. It is abbreviated "ES Option" or "ESO". Exterior changes included a black grille, black cowl grille, deluxe bumpers, black window frames, black exterior mirrors, black C-pillar ventilation louvers, bright belt moldings and turbine wheel covers. The interior featured black carpeting, a black three-spoke leather-wrapped steering wheel, black instrument panel with gray engine-turned trim and black or chamois-colored seats. The running gear was modified with stiffer springs, re-valved shocks, and a rear anti-roll bar. The ESO mounted DR78-14 radial tires on 5.5 inch wheels, one half inch wider than stock.

=== Police and taxicab packages ===
In 1978 Ford also made available specially prepared Fairmonts suitable for use as police cars and taxicabs. Initially the only engines offered for these applications were the 200 cubic inch inline six or the 302 V8. Ford's product literature lists the following special features for both packages:

- Automatic transmission with first-gear lockout
- Externally mounted transmission oil cooler
- Power brakes
- Heavy-duty body construction with extra reinforcements
- Heavy-duty suspension package (Police or Taxi), including higher-rate springs, hardened spindles, special shocks and struts
- Cooling package with high fin-density radiator
- Heavy-duty 14 x 5.5 inch wheels

In later years, the naturally aspirated 2.3 L inline four engine became available as well.

A few turbo, four-door, automatic sedans were used for testing by the California Highway Patrol.

== Other markets ==
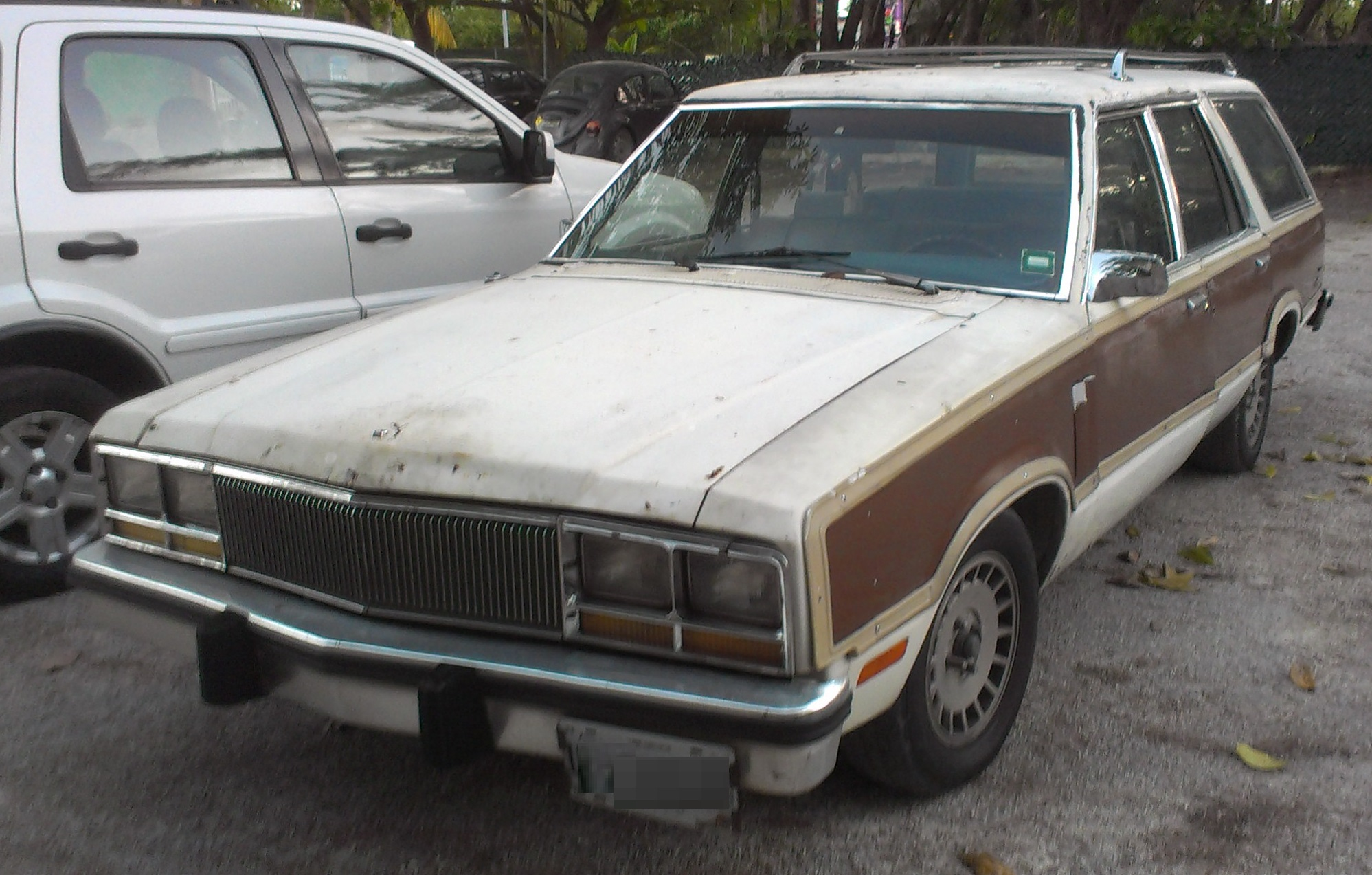
Ford Fairmont Squire (Mexico)

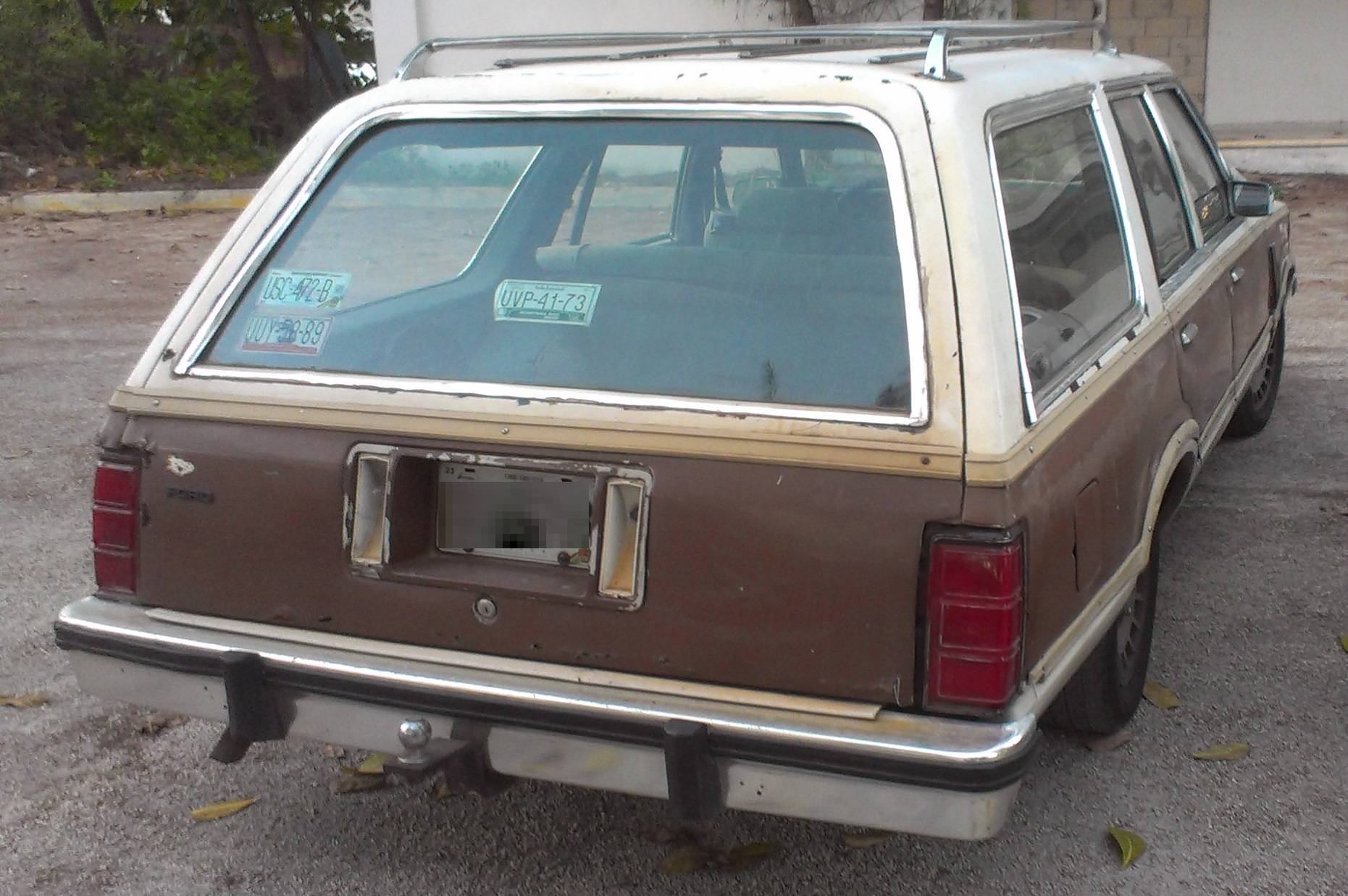
Ford Fairmont Squire (Mexico)

=== Mexico ===
The Ford Fairmont was introduced in Mexico in late 1977 as a 1978 model, replacing the Ford Maverick that was produced there locally. The Mexican Fairmont was available exclusively with the 5.0 L engine (302) with manual and three-speed automatic transmissions. It was offered as a two- or four-door sedan and a wagon. The Futura coupe with its distinctive Thunderbird-style roofline was never offered in Mexico. Instead there was an uplevel two-door sedan called the Fairmont Elite. It was distinguished from other Fairmonts by its higher level of equipment and vinyl roof. It used the four headlight grille from the Fairmont Futura along with the Mercury Zephyr's taillamps and rear quarter window louvers.

For 1981, all versions of the Fairmont got four headlights. The regular Fairmont continued to use the Futura grille while the Fairmont Elite used the Mercury Zephyr grille.

For 1982 the Fairmont Elite was renamed the Ford Elite II, and was offered in both two- and four-door sedans. The Elite II used the entire front end and matching rear bumper from the 1982 North American Ford Granada. The base Fairmont adapted the Mercury Zephyr grille used on the previous Elite.

For 1983, the Fairmont received a new 3.8 L Essex V6 engine which was sold in addition to the existing V8. This was the last year of the Fairmont as it was replaced later by the Ford Topaz which was a hybrid assembly of the Mercury Topaz with a Ford Tempo front end.

=== Venezuela ===
A version of the Fairmont was manufactured in Venezuela where it was sold initially as such and later as the Ford Zephyr. The Ford Futura was also sold as an individual model without Fairmont badging.

== Reception ==
Contemporary reviews were generally favorable, with many commenting on the "European" feel of the car and comparing it to the Volvo 200 series.

The 1978 Fairmont has been called the "most efficient Ford family (sedan) ever built from a space-per-weight perspective."

== Motorsports ==
In 1978 Bob Glidden campaigned an NHRA Pro Stock Futura powered by a Cleveland V8. The car won its debut race on 8 July 1978 at the Edgewater Winston Championship Series, where it also set a national record. Additional wins followed at the NHRA Grandnational, U.S. Nationals, Fall Nationals, World Finals and Beech Bend WCS. Glidden won his third national championship title with the car. The Futura was retired at the end of the 1978 season.

== See also ==
- Ford Fox platform
