= Michigan Assembly Plant =

Ford Motor Company assembly plant in Wayne, Michigan

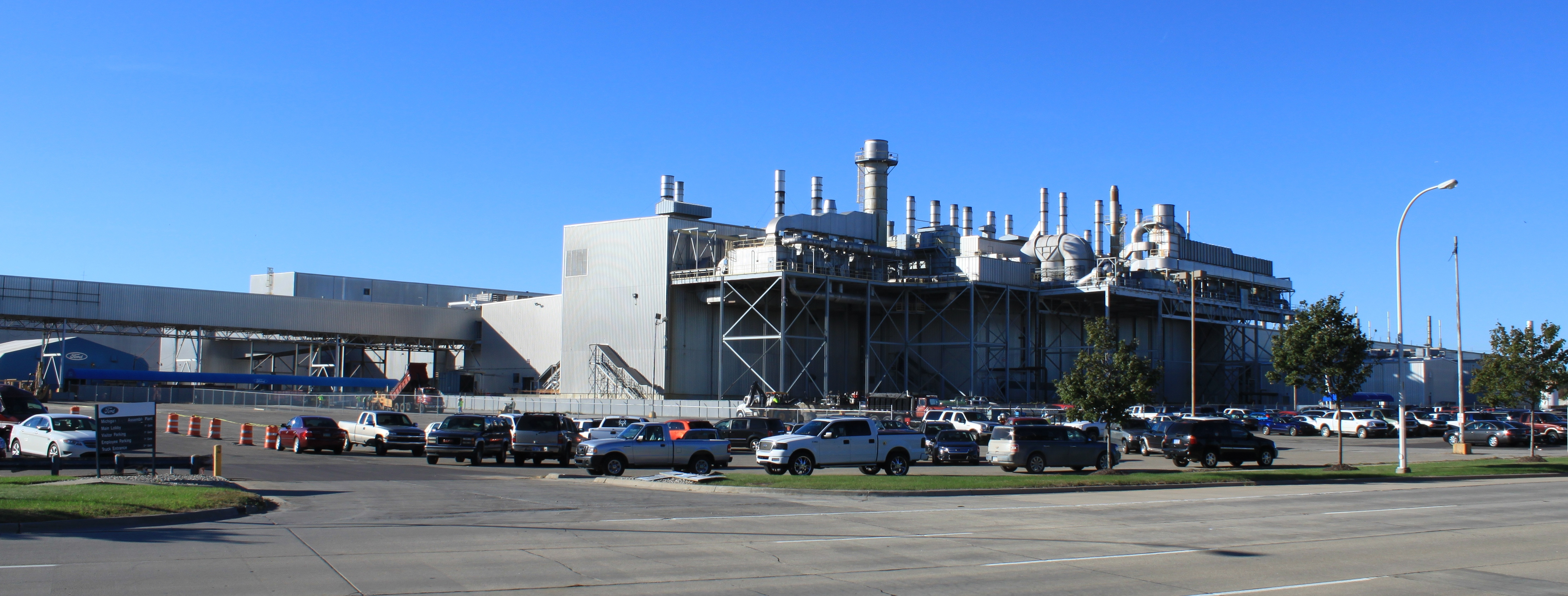
- Operated: 1957–present
- Location: 38303 Michigan Avenue; Wayne, Michigan, United States
- Coordinates: 42.2767°N 83.4089°W
- Industry: Automotive
- Products: SUVs and pickup trucks
- Employees: 5,950 (2025)
- Area: 369 acres (149 ha)
- Volume: 5,000,000 square feet (460,000 m^{2})
- Owner: Ford Motor Company

Michigan Assembly Plant, formerly known as Michigan Truck Plant, is a Ford Motor Company assembly plant in Wayne, Michigan. The plant employs approximately 5,600 hourly employees and 350 salaried employees (June 2025), comprises three main buildings with 5,000,000 sq ft (460,000 m^{2}) of factory floor space and is located adjacent to Wayne Stamping & Assembly. The plant was built in 1957 and has seen many expansions and upgrades. It currently produces the Ford Bronco and Ranger.

== History ==
The plant opened in 1957, as the Michigan Station Wagon Plant producing the Mercury Colony Park station wagon. In 1964 the plant was re-tooled to produce pickup trucks, producing the first F-100. In 1965, the 100,000th truck rolled off the line. In 1968 two large additions were made to the plant that increased overall capacity. The plant was expanded again in 1974, 1991 and 1996. In 1997, the plant began producing SUVs, and in 2010 was re-tooled again to produce the Focus. By late 2010, Ford completed a $550 million renovation, enabling the plant to change production between various models without significant downtime and to produce gas-powered cars as well as battery electric, hybrid and plug-in hybrid variations. The renovation also included a 500-kilowatt solar panel system and ten electric vehicle charging stations for recharging electric part-transport trucks running between adjacent facilities. With these upgrades, it manufactured the third-generation North American Ford Focus from December 14, 2010, until May 4, 2018.

Ford reintroduced the Ford Ranger pickup in the North American market for the 2019 model year with the Bronco to follow in year 2021, and they are produced at the Wayne plant. The launch of the Bronco was delayed to the end of summer 2021 due to coronavirus-related supplier issues. The plant currently has 2.8 million square feet of floor space and a capacity of 5,300 units per week.

== Production ==
=== Current ===
- Ford Ranger (November 2018–present)
- Ford Bronco (2020–present)

=== Past ===
- Ford C-Max (hybrid & plug-in hybrid versions) (2012–2018)
- Ford Focus Electric (2011–2018)
- Ford Focus (1999–2018)
- Lincoln Navigator & Navigator L (January 1997 – 2009)
- Ford Expedition & Expedition EL/Max (January 1996 – 2009)
- Ford Bronco (1966–1996)
- Mercury Tracer (1991-1999)
- Ford Escort (1981-2002)
- Mercury Lynx (1981-1987)
- Ford EXP/Mercury LN7 (1982–1988)
- Ford Granada/Mercury Monarch/Lincoln Versailles (1975–1980)
- Ford Maverick/Mercury Comet (1974–1975)
- Ford Galaxie/Mercury Monterey (1959–1974)
- Mercury Colony Park (1957–1959)

== See also ==
- List of Ford factories
