= Ford C4 transmission =

C4/C5

Overview
- Manufacturer: Ford Motor Company
- Production: 1964–1986

Body and chassis
- Class: 3-speed longitudinal automatic transmission
- Related: Ford C6

Chronology
- Predecessor: Ford-O-Matic
- Successor: AOD

The Ford C4 is a three-speed, medium-duty automatic transmission introduced on 1964 model year vehicles and produced through 1981. The C4 was designed to be a lighter and simpler replacement for the original Ford-O-Matic two speed transmission being used in smaller, less powerful cars.

Ford used the term "SelectShift" because in the first C4's, placing the gear selector in D2 forced the transmission to start in second gear and then shift to third gear. If the transmission was placed in D1, the transmission would start in first gear, then shift to second and third gear as normal. If the gear selector was placed into L, the transmission stayed in first gear only. The shifter display appeared as P-R-N-D2-D1-L. Because this was confusing, later versions of the C4 were changed to a P-R-N-D-2-1 (or L) pattern typically seen today.

Because of its cast iron construction, the Ford-O-Matic was very heavy. In designing the C4, Ford used an aluminum alloy, three-piece case (bell housing, main case, and tailhousing). The aluminum case and the use of a simpler Simpson planetary gearset reduced the weight significantly (estimated at 185 lbs (83.9Kg)). It was primarily used with Ford's inline six-cylinder engines and small V8 engines (see Ford small block engines), usually up to 302 in³ (5.0 L). By comparison, the 351 Windsor and 351 Cleveland small and intermediate-block engines were backed by the medium-duty FMX or the heavy-duty C6 that debuted in 1966. Some C4s were built with a larger spread bell housing to use with 351M V8s, but these are rare. A few were also used with FE engines, mostly the 390 in full-size cars. Ratios are 2.46 low, 1.46 second and direct high.

The early model C4 (1964–1969) used a .788-inch 24-spline input shaft, which was upgraded in 1970 to 26-spline and .839-inch. The upgrade also included a matching 26-spline clutch hub. In 1971, Ford went to a 26/24-spline input shaft, meaning the torque-converter side is 26-spline and the clutch hub is 24-spline.

The C4 was also found with valve bodies requiring a different number of bolts, 8-bolt vs 9-bolt. A 9-bolt valve body can be used in either case, but a nut and bolt must be used on the valve body in the empty hole, dropping the bolt in from the top and using the nut on the bottom/filter side.

Modified C4s remain popular with hot rodders and drag racers due to their simplicity and durability.

Year and model breakdown:

- 1964–1966 Select Shift, 24/24 spline, castings: C4, C5, C6
- 1967–1969 Select Shift, 24/24 spline, castings: C7, C8, C9
- 1970–1970 Select Shift, 26/26 spline, castings: D0
- 1971–1979 Select Shift, 26/24 spline, castings: D1, D2, D3, D4, D5, D6, D7, D8, D9

Applications:

- 1973–1977 Ford Bronco
- 1974–1982 Ford Cortina
- 1964–1967 Ford Econoline and Falcon Vans
- 1965–1983 Ford F-Series
- 1964–1970 Ford Fairlane
- 1978–1983 Ford Fairmont
- 1965–1970 Ford Falcon
- 1966–1982 Ford Falcon/Fairmont/Fairlane (Australia)
- 1975–1982 Ford Granada
- 1975–1980 Ford LTD
- 1970–1977 Ford Maverick
- 1965–1981 Ford Mustang
- 1971–1980 Ford Pinto
- 1965–1979 Ford Ranchero
- 1968–1981 Ford Thunderbird
- 1968–1976 Ford Torino
- 1964–1981 Lincolns
- 1977–1980 Lincoln Versailles
- 1974–1980 Mercury Bobcat
- 1972–1981 Mercury Capri
- 1964–1977 Mercury Comet
- 1967–1981 Mercury Cougar
- 1975–1980 Mercury Monarch
- 1968–1976 Mercury Montego
- 1978–1981 Mercury Zephyr

== C5 ==
As fuel economy became more important, the C4 was replaced in 1982 by the C5, which was essentially a C4 with a lock-up clutch in the torque converter to improve highway fuel economy. It bore the casting numbers E2, E3, E4, E5, and E6, corresponding with the year it was produced. The C5 was phased out in 1986, replaced by the AOD. The production plant in Sharonville, Ohio was converted to production of the C6 transmission which was relocated from Livonia, Michigan, as the Livonia facility was converted to the AOD.

Applications:

- 1986 Ford Aerostar
- 1983–1986 Ford Ranger
- 1983–1985 Ford Bronco II
- 1983–1986 Ford LTD
- 1982–1986 Ford Thunderbird
- 1982–1986 Mercury Capri
- 1982–1986 Mercury Cougar
- 1983–1986 Mercury Marquis
- 1983 Mercury Zephyr
