= Wayne Stamping & Assembly =

Ford manufacturing plant in Wayne, Michigan, United States

Wayne Stamping & Assembly Plant
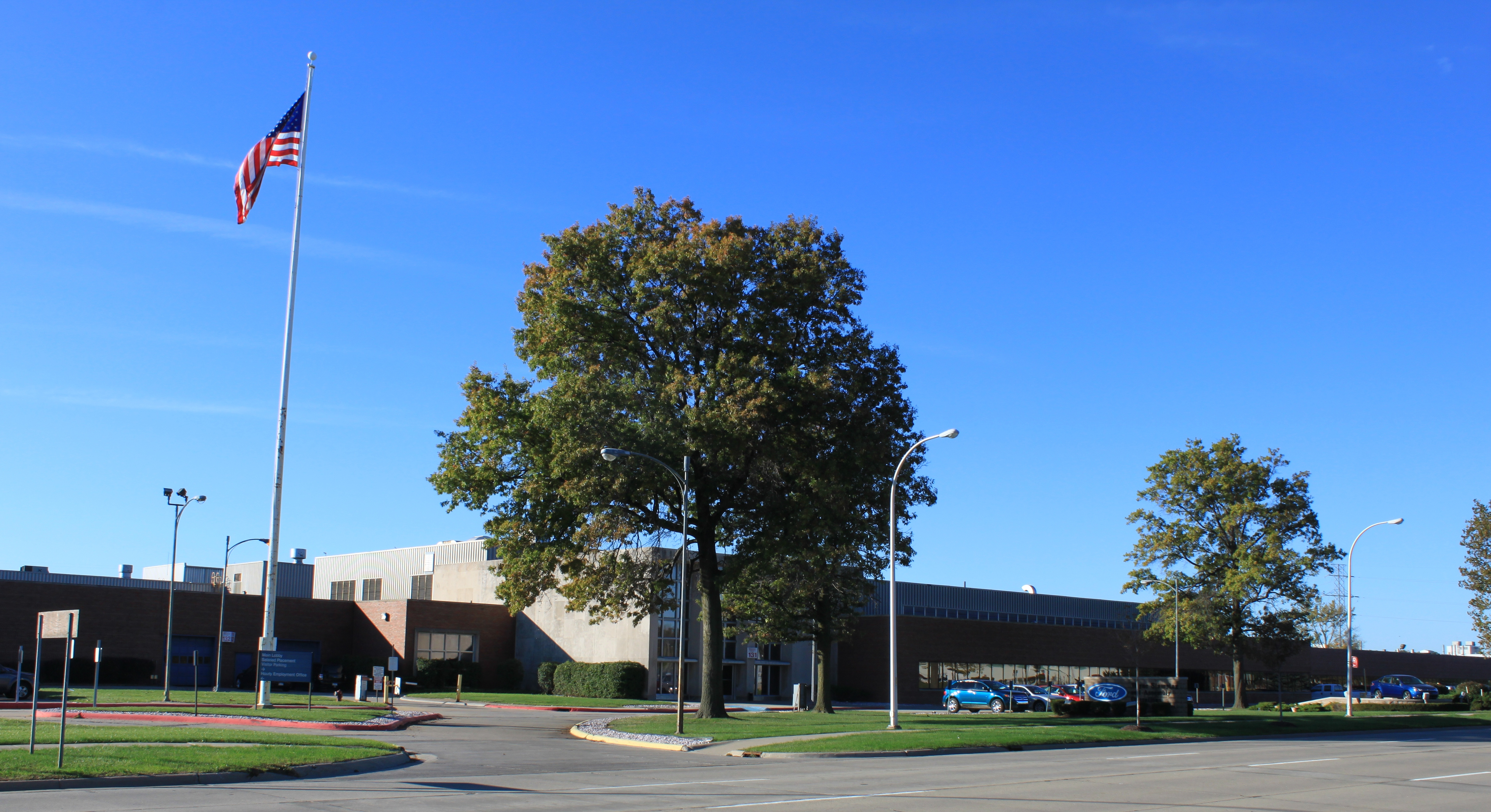
- Operated: 1952–present
- Location: 37500 Van Born Road; Wayne, Michigan, United States
- Coordinates: 42.2714°N 83.4114°W
- Industry: Automotive
- Products: stamping passenger vehicles
- Employees: 3,000
- Area: 229 acres (93 ha)
- Volume: 3,500,000 square feet (330,000 m^{2})
- Owner: Ford Motor Company

The Wayne Stamping and Assembly Plant is a Ford manufacturing plant in Wayne, Michigan, United States. Many of its more than 3,000 employees are represented by UAW Local 900.

== Facility description ==
The 3,500,000-square-foot (330,000 m^{2}) plant opened in 1952 on 229 acres (0.93 km^{2}), and integrates both stamping and assembly operations. Assembled body units and stamped body components are transferred from the stamping/body area of one building to the paint and assembly area of the adjacent building via an overpass bridge. The assembly process includes welding (with and without robots) and sealing of sheet metal body components, metal finishing (sanding and surface preparation), phosphate coating, painting, and final assembly.

In 2007, Ford agreed not to close the plant under a new contract with the UAW in exchange for hiring up to one-fifth of its U.S. workforce at roughly half its average factory wage, with pay starting at just over $14 an hour.

The facility is now part of the Michigan Assembly Plant.

== Environmental issues ==
A long-term agreement between Detroit Edison and Wayne allows landfill gas from Woodland Meadows Landfill to be collected, compressed, and sent through underground piping to the plant. The boilers burn a combination of natural gas and landfill gas to create steam for use in the plant., The landfill gas also powers three engine generators, which produce approximately 2.4 megawatts of electricity. The electricity is sent to Detroit Edison's grid system using a step-up transformer. Flaring of the landfill gas is minimized in turn reducing emissions from the landfill. Exhaust from the engines is recycled via ducts to the boilers' fireboxes; the combustion in the boilers acts as a re-burn cycle to further reduce the emissions from the engines. The 2 million British thermal units per hour (0.6 megawatts) of recovered heat from the engines means less gas in the boilers, reducing energy consumption and emissions. The partnership of Ford and Detroit Edison gives the utility company an electricity source from garbage that displaces coal-fired power.

Generators were taken offline and removed in 2009

A new energy project was started in 2011. Ford's Michigan Assembly Plant is now home to one of the largest solar arrays in all of Michigan. Detroit Edison, Xtreme Power and the state have teamed up with Ford to install a 500-kilowatt solar array along with a 750-kilowatt battery system with 2 megawatt-hours of energy – enough to power 100 average homes in Michigan for a year. The solar setup powers production of the Focus and Focus Electric and sends excess energy back to the grid.

== Rail operations ==
The Ford complex is serviced by two Class 1 railroads, Norfolk Southern and CSX. The complex straddles the Wayne Junction, where Norfolk Southern's east-west Michigan Line crosses CSX's north-south Saginaw Subdivision. Norfolk Southern's Wayne Yard (milepost 18.5) is to the south of the Stamping & Assembly plant, and consists of ten sidings (plus the dual main). CSX's Wayne Yard (milepost CC90.1) is on the east side of the plant, and consists of more than 20 sidings. Much of the rolling stock consists of tri-level enclosed auto racks (89' long and 19' tall). Steel coils which are brought in by NS and CSX are a common sight for they are needed for stamping.

== Past products ==
Beginning in 1953 Wayne Stamping and Assembly was the factory of origin for all Mercury vehicles, and knock-down kits were sent to Maywood Assembly, Maywood, California or St. Louis Assembly, St.Louis, Missouri, and assembled locally. Some of the former products built at the plant included (some years are approximate):

- Mercury Full-Size (Custom, Monterey, Montclair, Park Lane, Turnpike Cruiser, Marauder, Marquis), 1952-1973
- Edsel, 1958-1960
- Lincoln Capri (1952-1957)
- Lincoln Premiere (1956-1957)
- Ford Full-Size (Custom, Galaxie, XL, LTD), 1962-1973
- Ford Maverick, 1974
- Mercury Comet, 1974
- Ford Granada, 1975-1980
- Mercury Monarch, 1975-1980
- Lincoln Versailles, 1977-1980
- Mercury Lynx, 1981-1987
- Ford Escort, 1981-2000
- Mercury LN7, 1982-1983
- Ford EXP, 1982-1988
- Mercury Tracer, 1991-1999
- Ford Focus 1999-2018
- Ford C-Max 2012-2018
