= Mahwah Assembly =

Car factory in New Jersey, U.S.

- Operated: 1955–1980
- Location: Mahwah, New Jersey
- Coordinates: 41°06′19″N 74°09′46″W
- Industry: Automotive
- Products: Automobiles
- Area: 172 acres (0.70 km^{2})
- Owner: Ford Motor Company

Mahwah Assembly was a Ford Motor Company manufacturing plant in Mahwah, New Jersey, 30 miles (48 km) from New York City. It occupied over 172 acres.

== History ==
The factory produced its first vehicle on 19 July 1955; it was closed in 1980. It was one of three manufacturing facilities in New Jersey. It was built two years after the Edison Assembly plant opened and would eventually replace the Ford Motor Company Edgewater Assembly Plant which closed in 1955.

Mahwah Assembly produced 6 million cars in the 25 years it operated before the last car rolled off the line on June 20, 1980. At the time of its completion, it was the largest motor vehicle assembly plant in the United States. The Ford plant, along with other businesses such as American Brake Shoe and Foundry Company, helped contribute to the economic development of the town and its reputation for low home property taxes. The Mahwah town sports teams remain named Thunderbirds in honor of the Ford plant.

A portion of the plant site was the U.S. headquarters of Sharp Corporation, and subsequently became home to the US Headquarters of Jaguar Land Rover and Amazing Savings.

== Products ==
Vehicles produced at the plant included the 1957 Ford, Edsel, Ford Fairmont, Ford Galaxie, Ford Granada, Ford LTD, Ford Thunderbird, Ford F Series, Lincoln Versailles, Mercury Colony Park, Mercury Meteor, Mercury Monarch and the Mercury Zephyr.

== Popular culture ==
Bruce Springsteen's 1982 song "Johnny 99" references the closure of the Mahwah plant in its opening line.

== See also ==
- List of Ford factories
- Ringwood Mines landfill site
