= Lincoln Versailles =

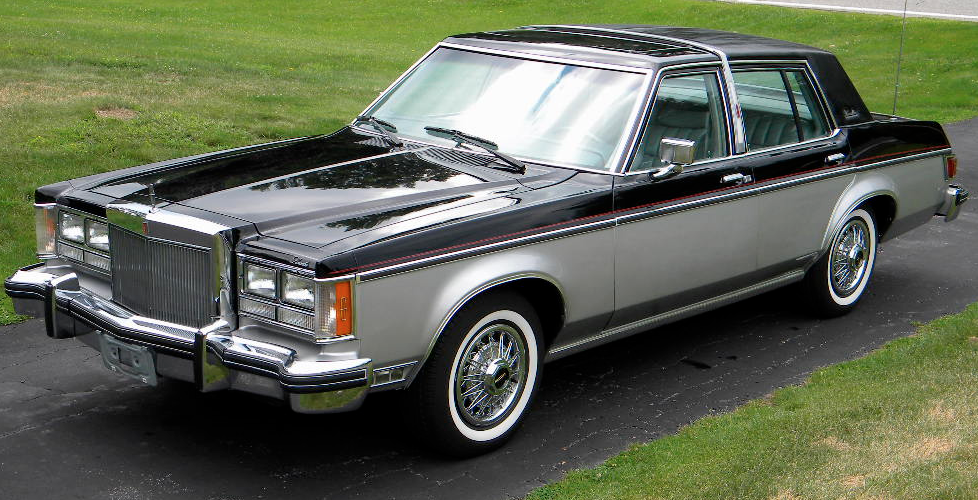
- 1980 Lincoln Versailles

Overview
- Manufacturer: Lincoln (Ford)
- Production: 1977–1980
- Assembly: United States: Wayne, Michigan (Wayne Stamping & Assembly); United States: Mahwah, New Jersey (Mahwah Assembly)

Body and chassis
- Class: Compact luxury car
- Body style: 4-door sedan
- Layout: FR layout
- Related: Mercury Monarch; Ford Granada

Powertrain
- Engine: 302 cu in (4.9 L) small block V8; 351 cu in (5.8 L) Windsor V8

Dimensions
- Wheelbase: 109.9 in (2,791 mm)
- Length: 200.9 in (5,103 mm)
- Width: 74.5 in (1,892 mm)
- Height: 54.1 in (1,374 mm)
- Curb weight: 3,827–3,913 pounds (1,736–1,775 kg)

Chronology
- Predecessor: Mercury Grand Monarch Ghia
- Successor: Lincoln Continental (1982; indirect)

The Lincoln Versailles is a mid-size luxury sedan that was sold by Lincoln from the 1977 to 1980 model years. Taking its name from the French palace, the model line was the smallest vehicle ever marketed by the brand at the time, introduced as a competitor for the Cadillac Seville. The first Lincoln with exposed headlights since 1969, the model line was the first vehicle marketed in North America with clearcoat paint and halogen headlights.

Replacing the Mercury Grand Monarch Ghia, the Versailles was a variant of the Ford Granada and Mercury Monarch. Offered only as a four-door sedan, the model line marked the ultimate development of the chassis architecture of the American Ford Falcon.

Ford manufactured the Versailles alongside the Granada and Monarch at Wayne Stamping & Assembly (Wayne, Michigan) and Mahwah Assembly (Mahwah, New Jersey), with production totaling 50,156. Though the model line was never directly replaced, Lincoln downsized its Continental for 1982, nearly matching the Versailles in size.

== Origin of name ==
In the 1950s, Ford SAF marketed a Ford Versailles, which was a version of the Simca Vedette.

In 1966, during the development of what would become the Continental Mark III, Ford researched suitable nameplates with potential consumers with Versailles placing third (after Mark VI and LeMarque). Though Ford ultimately sought to restart the Mark series chronology with Mark III (succeeding the Continental Mark II), the company kept Versailles held for use, selecting it for its Cadillac Seville competitor (a car named after a Spanish province).

== Background ==
During the mid-1970s, the Lincoln division of Ford sought to expand its model range for multiple reasons. Though sales of large luxury cars would ultimately recover in the aftermath of the 1973 oil crisis, in the United States, the rise of imported cars also led to transition in the luxury-vehicle segment. While competing with Cadillac, Imperial, and Lincoln in terms of price, the West German BMW 3.0Si and Mercedes-Benz 350SE/450SE and the British Jaguar XJ offered American luxury car customers a far different vehicle than produced by Ford, GM, or Chrysler.

In 1973, the Lincoln Mark I Ghia concept car was developed by Ghia, derived from the Ford Granada Mk I.

For 1976, the Cadillac Seville was introduced in May 1975. Developed by GM (in only 16 months) in response to both the fuel crises and in effort to match European luxury sedans, the Seville sourced its V8 engine from Oldsmobile and its chassis underpinnings from the Chevrolet Nova. The smallest Cadillac in 40 years, the Seville broke a long-running industry precedent, as the near-compact model Cadillac was its most expensive (non-limousine) sedan.

Coinciding with the launch of the Seville, Ford began development of a Lincoln-branded competitor to the model line, tasked with bringing the model line to market for the 1977 model year. Adopting the Lincoln Versailles name, Ford used the body architecture of the Ford Granada/Mercury Monarch compact sedans, introduced for 1975. Sized closely against the GM X-body compacts, the Granada/Monarch were developed to replace the Ford Maverick/Mercury Comet. With little over than a year until its product launch, the Versailles was relegated to become a variant of a production vehicle, sharing a large degree of its body panels with its Mercury counterpart. To further streamline development, the Versailles adopted the design features of the highest-trim Mercury Grand Monarch Ghia (which was discontinued for 1977).

In line with the Seville, the Versailles was the most expensive Lincoln sedan at $11,500 ($61,100 in 2025 dollars); Lincoln-Mercury priced the model line $2000 under the Seville, keeping the model line below the Continental Mark V in price. The first Lincoln manufactured outside of Wixom Assembly since 1957, the Versailles was produced alongside the Mercury Monarch and Ford Granada.

== Overview ==
The Lincoln Versailles marked the first time since 1960 that Lincoln offered two sedan lines. Nearly three feet shorter than the Continental, the model line was offered only as a four-door sedan.

=== Exterior ===
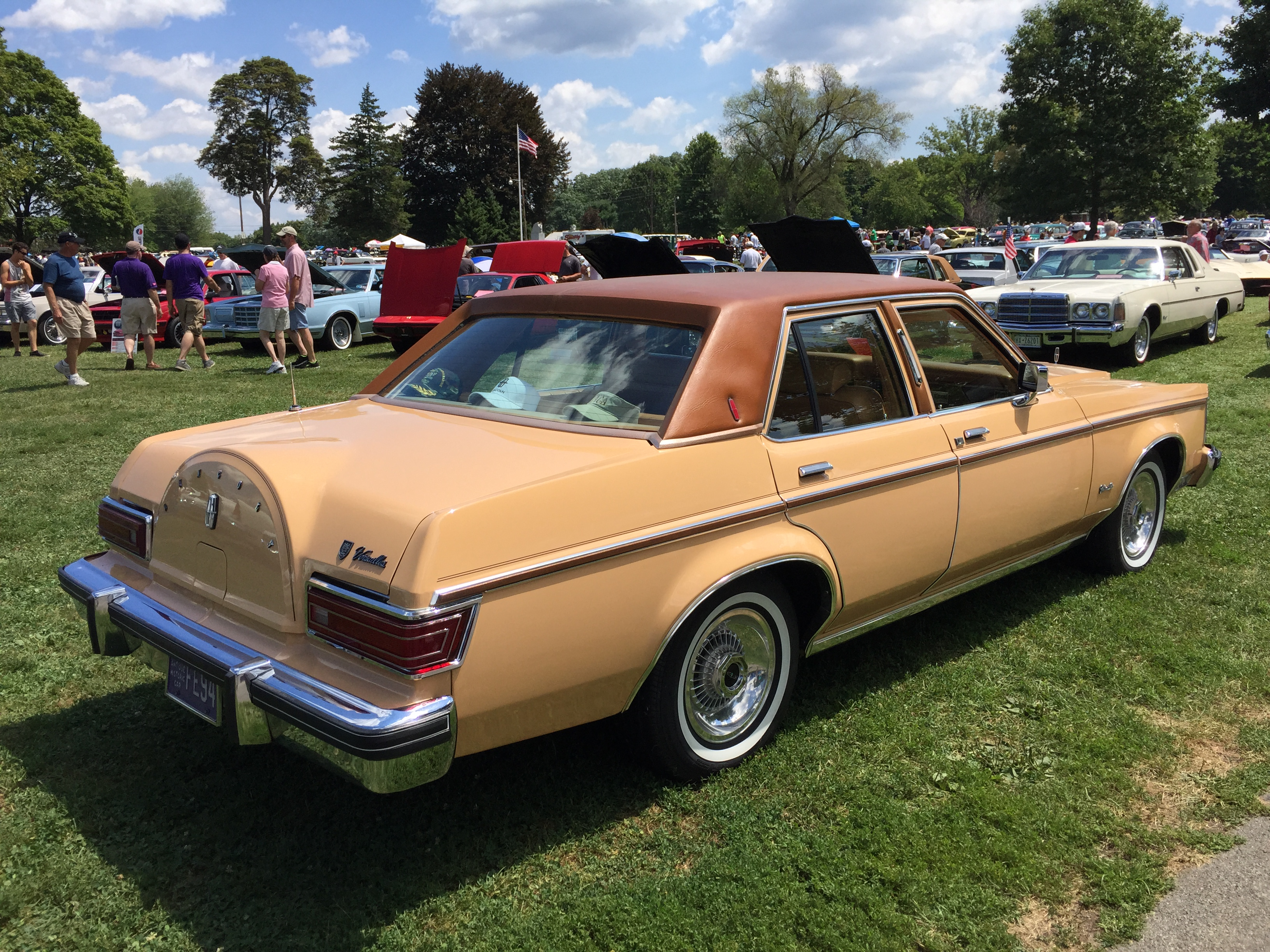
1977 Lincoln Versailles, showing rear trunk detail

The Versailles shared many visible body panels with the Monarch and Granada, including the entire roofline. Several design elements were revised, giving the Versailles an appearance closer in line to the Continental and Mark V, including a "Continental spare" decklid (with LINCOLN lettering) and model-specific taillamps; the Versailles (the first Lincoln with exposed headlamps since 1969) introduced rectangular headlamps to the brand.

For 1979, the model line received a revised roofline, distinct from the Granada/Monarch. Developed by American Sunroof Company, and marketed by Lincoln as a coach roof, a fiberglass cap sat over the existing metal stampings, wrapped with a "frenched" vinyl roof, giving a more upright rear window, and requiring the vinyl roof as standard equipment.

=== Interior ===
Essentially taking over the role of the Mercury Grand Monarch Ghia, the Lincoln Versailles inherited many standard interior features, including many seen in the larger Mercury Grand Marquis and Lincoln Continental. Along with power-operated leather-trim seats and steering wheel, power steering and windows, the Versailles included features such as a digital LCD clock, dual map lights, lighted passenger vanity mirror, rear-seat map pockets, and plush carpeting with soundproofing.

=== Chassis ===
The Versailles shared its wheelbase with the Ford Granada/Mercury Monarch and the four-door Ford Maverick/Mercury Comet. Marketed as a compact, the footprint of Versailles more closely aligned with cars of later mid-size cars.

Lincoln advertised a dedicated quality-control regimen used at the factory. According to the marketing, final assembly included dynamometer testing of the engine/transmission, a water spray test to pinpoint body leaks, and a simulated road test. The Versailles featured "matched and balanced" driveline elements, low-friction lower ball joints, double isolated shocks, reinforced chassis areas, sound insulation, and balanced forged 14-inch aluminum wheels with Michelin whitewall X-radials. Bodywork received the first clear-coat paint on a regular production car.”

The Versailles shared its powertrain with the Monarch upon which it was based, with a V8 engine as a sole choice. Initially, the Versailles was powered by the 351 cubic-inch V8, phased out in favor of the 302 cubic-inch V8. The three-speed C4 automatic transmission was the only transmission available. The rear differential used in the Versailles was Ford 9-inch with rear disc brakes, replacing the drums used on the Granada and the Monarch.

Engine model	Displacement	Horsepower	Torque	Transmission
Ford small block V8	302 cubic inches (4.9 liters)	133 bhp (99 kW; 135 PS) at 3600 rpm	243 lb⋅ft (329 N⋅m) at 1600 rpm	Ford C4 3-speed automatic
Ford Windsor V8	351 cubic inches (5.8 liters)	135 bhp (101 kW; 137 PS) at 3200 rpm	275 lb⋅ft (373 N⋅m) at 1600 rpm	Ford C4 3-speed automatic

== Sales ==
In comparison to the Cadillac Seville, the Lincoln Versailles fared poorly, outsold by the Cadillac by a three to one margin in its 1977 debut year. Following its update for the 1979 model year, sales of the Versailles would more than double, though remaining far behind its Cadillac counterpart.

In its entire production run, Lincoln would sell 50,156 examples of the Versailles. By comparison, Cadillac would outsell that total in both 1978 and 1979, the last two years of the first-generation Seville.

Lincoln would temporarily revert to an all-full-size lineup for 1981 before introducing a downsized, Fox-based Continental for 1982.

Model Year	Production
1977	15,434
1978	8,931
1979	21,007
1980	4,784
