= Ford Granada (North America) =

North American model of Ford Granada (1975–1982)

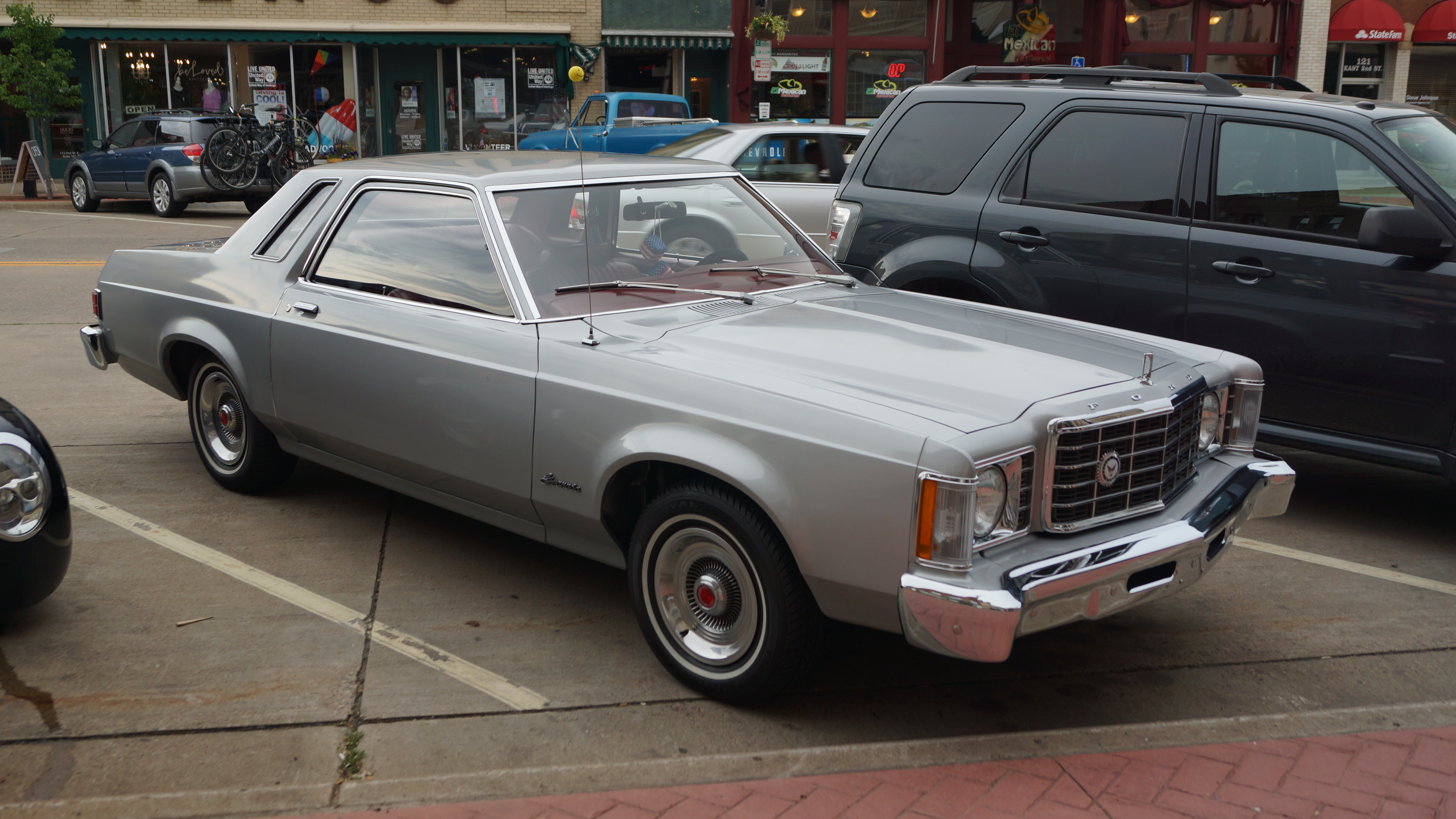
- Ford Granada coupe (first generation)

Overview
- Manufacturer: Ford
- Model years: 1975–1982

Body and chassis
- Class: Compact (1975–1980); Mid-size (1981–1982)
- Layout: Front-engine, rear-wheel drive

Chronology
- Predecessor: Ford Maverick
- Successor: Ford LTD

The North American version of the Ford Granada is a range of sedans that was manufactured and marketed by Ford over two generations (1975–1982). Developed as the original successor for the Ford Maverick, the Granada shares its name with Ford of Europe's flagship sedan. The model line was marketed as a luxury compact vehicle, expanding the segment in the United States.

The first generation of the Granada was a compact sedan, between the Maverick and the Torino (and the Fairmont and LTD II that replaced them) in the Ford sedan range. The second generation was a mid-size sedan, marketed alongside the Fairmont and LTD. For the 1983 model year, the Granada underwent a mid-cycle revision, taking on the Ford LTD nameplate; the model line was ultimately replaced by the Ford Taurus after the 1986 model year.

In total, over two million examples of the Ford Granada were produced for the U.S. market. The first generation was produced by Mahwah Assembly and Michigan Assembly with the second generation produced by Atlanta Assembly and Chicago Assembly.

== Background ==
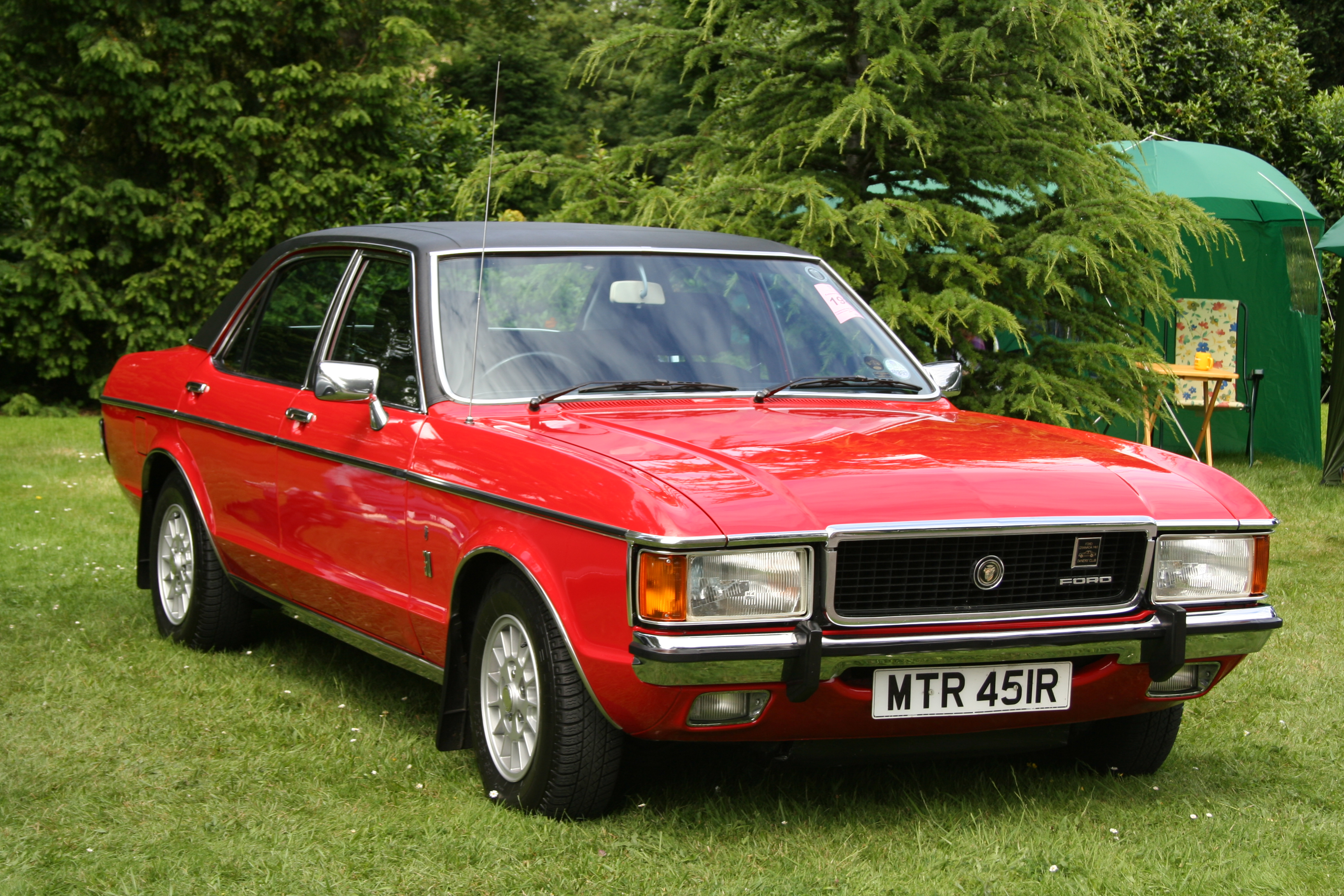
European Mk1 Granada 4-door sedan

While originally intended to replace the Ford Maverick, design work for the Ford Granada predated the 1973 fuel crisis. In 1969, Ford began research predicting the emergence of the luxury compact segment, driven by gasoline prices, multiple-vehicle families, and urban traffic. In 1970, Ford began design work on a prototype vehicle, later becoming the production Granada. In what would later become a central theme of the marketing of the Granada, Ford benchmarked the Mercedes-Benz 280 (W114), using it as a basis for styling and dimensions. As an alternative, Ford considered importing the Granada produced by Ford of Europe; it was rejected as cost-prohibitive.

To expand its sales potential of fuel-efficient automobiles, the Ford Granada was redeveloped before its launch, becoming an additional compact model line. While not intended as a direct competitor for European luxury sedans (such as Mercedes-Benz or BMW), Ford intended for the Granada to be sold to buyers either downsizing from a larger intermediate or full-size car while wanting to retain the same comfort and convenience features along with buyers seeking to upgrade from a lower-content compact car.

== First generation (1975–1980) ==
First generation
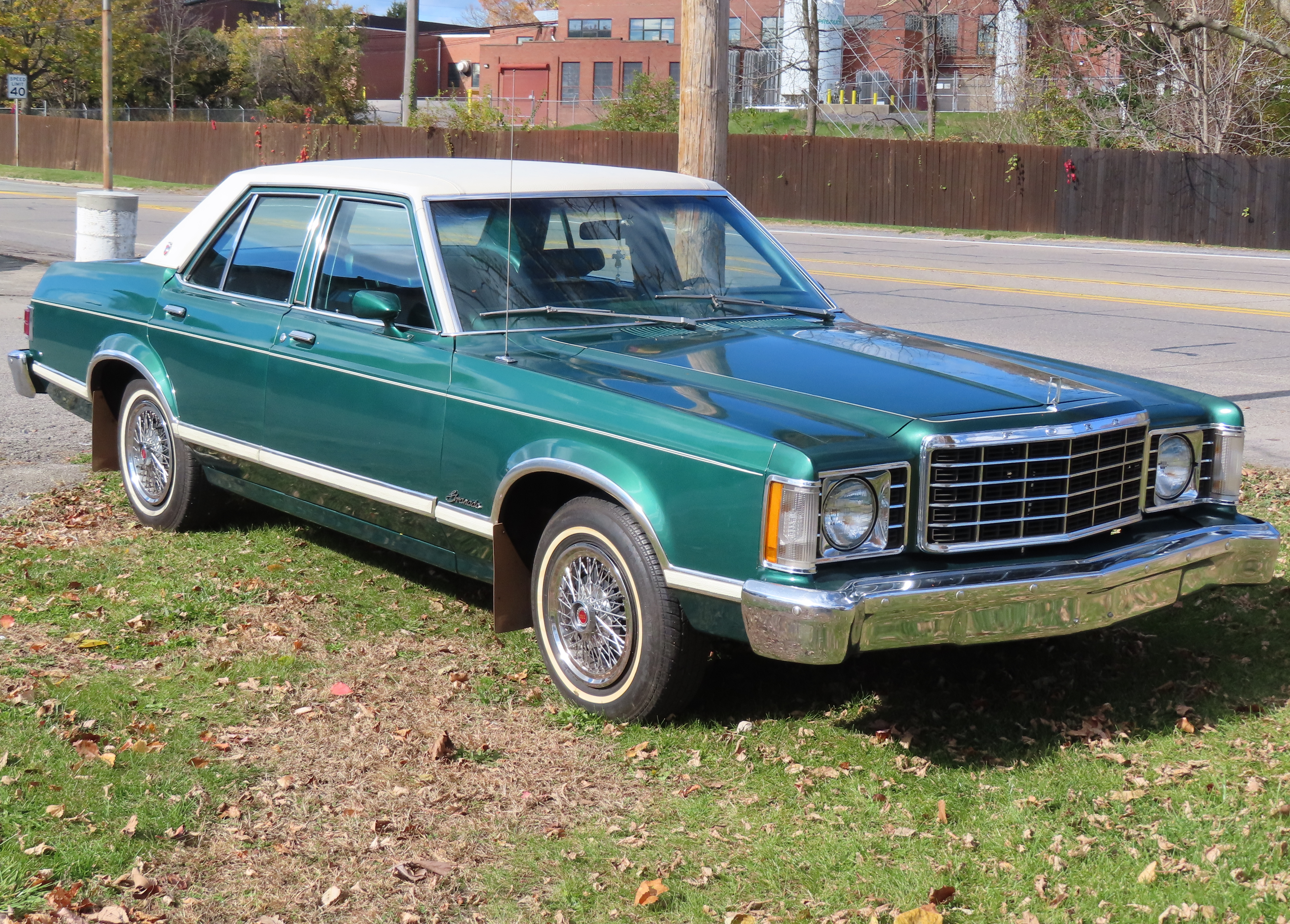
- 1977 Ford Granada Ghia sedan

Overview
- Model years: 1975–1980
- Assembly: United States: Mahwah, New Jersey (Mahwah Assembly); United States: Wayne, Michigan (Michigan Assembly)

Body and chassis
- Body style: 2-door coupe 4-door sedan
- Related: Mercury Monarch; Lincoln Versailles; Ford Maverick; Mercury Comet

Powertrain
- Engine: 200 cu in (3.3 L) Thriftpower I6; 250 cu in (4.1 L) Thriftpower I6; 302 cu in (4.9 L) Windsor V8; 351 cu in (5.8 L) Windsor V8
- Transmission: 3-speed manual 3-speed C4 automatic 4-speed manual

Dimensions
- Wheelbase: 109.9 in (2,791 mm)
- Length: 197.7 in (5,022 mm)
- Width: 74.5 in (1,892 mm)
- Height: 54.1 in (1,374 mm)
- Curb weight: 3,120 lb (1,415 kg)

The first generation of the Granada was introduced for the 1975 model year, slotted between the Maverick and the Torino within the Ford product line. Originally intended as the successor for the Maverick, the development of the Granada was heavily influenced by the 1973 oil crisis. In response to increased demand for compact-segment automobiles, Ford continued the production of Maverick (through the 1977 model year); the Granada was repackaged as a premium vehicle in its segment.

In its most basic form, the Ford Granada offered few standard features over the Maverick (including manual steering, non-power brakes, and a column-shifted manual transmission). To allow for a high degree of owner customization, the option list for the Granada was long, adding many features traditionally included on the Ford Gran Torino and Ford LTD.

=== Chassis ===
The Granada derives its rear-wheel drive chassis from the 1960–1965 Ford Falcon (effectively giving the model line mechanical commonality with the first-generation Ford Mustang and Mercury Cougar). Using unibody construction, the Granada was equipped with coil-spring front suspension and a leaf-sprung live rear axle (in contrast to larger Ford sedans). Both versions of the Granada have a 109.9 inch wheelbase, derived from the four-door Ford Maverick.

While the Granada was largely a clean-sheet design, the forward part of the floorpan of the Maverick was adopted into the unibody structure, along with elements of the steering gear and suspension.

The standard brakes for the Ford Granada were front disc (11-inch rotors) and rear drums (10-inch). Four-wheel disc brakes were optional with an optional anti-lock system (marketed as "anti-skid" brakes), powered by a central hydraulic system.

The Granada was equipped with a 200 cubic-inch inline-six engine as standard, with a 250 cubic-inch inline-six as an optional engine. Shared with the Maverick, the 302 small block V8 was offered as an option; the 351 Windsor V8 was an option solely for the Granada. A three-speed manual (column-shifted or floor shifted) was standard, with a three-speed automatic offered as an option (standard on the 351 V8); a four-speed manual was introduced in 1976.

=== Body ===
The first-generation Ford Granada was offered as a four-door sedan and two-door coupe. In a major shift away from the Coke-bottle styling of the Ford Maverick, the Granada adopted a combination of both U.S. and European design elements. The roofline of the four-door sedan was heavily influenced by Mercedes-Benz, along with the proportion of the taillamps and grille. The two-door was given a separate roofline; the trapezoidal door window with an opera window in the B/C-pillar was a design feature later used in the Ford Thunderbird, Ford LTD 2-door, Ford LTD II and all of their Mercury badged counterparts.

While designed independently from the U.S. Ford Granada, the European Ford Granada Mark II (produced from 1977 to 1982) would adopt similar design features as its four-door U.S. counterpart, including the roofline and rear fascia. For 1978, the exterior of the Ford Granada underwent a mid-cycle revision, concentrating on the front fascia. In addition to a revised grille design, the round headlamps were replaced by rectangular units stacked above the turn signal lenses (to more closely match the design of the Ford LTD II and the Mercedes-Benz W114). The rear fascia was given revised taillamp lenses and revised center panel trim if optionally equipped. In the interest of aerodynamics, the sideview mirrors were changed from rectangular to oval.

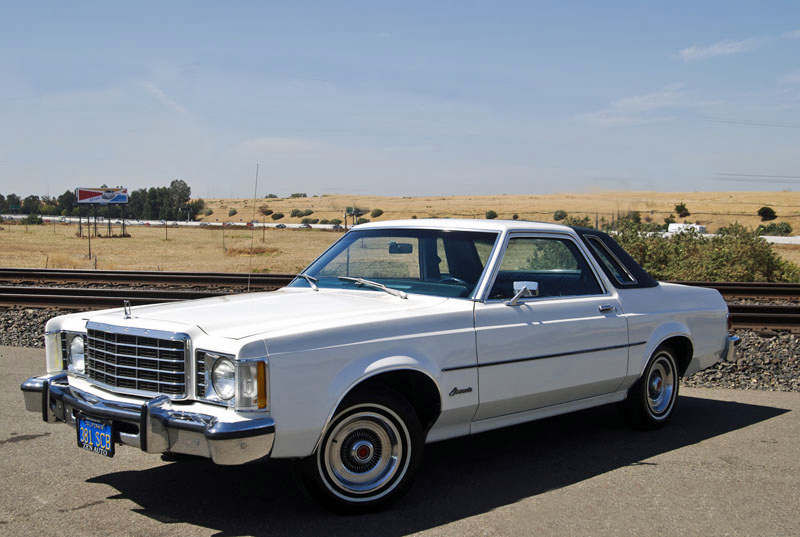
1977 Granada Ghia coupe

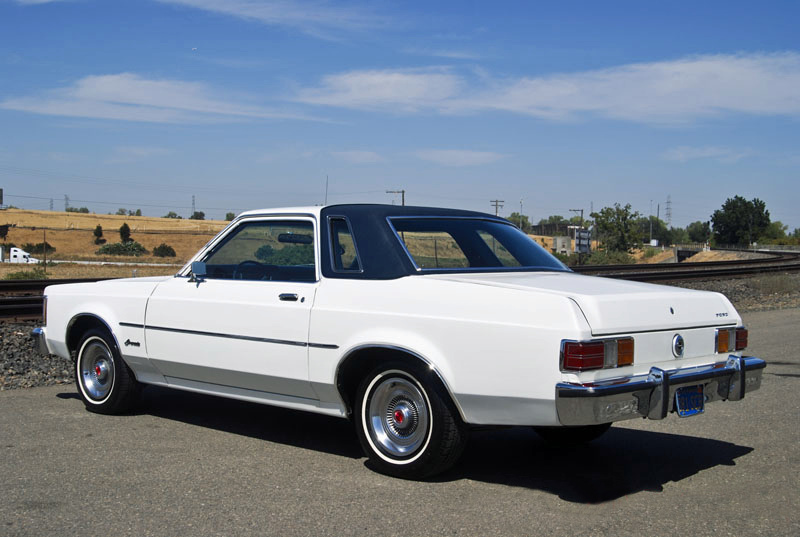
1977 Granada Ghia coupe

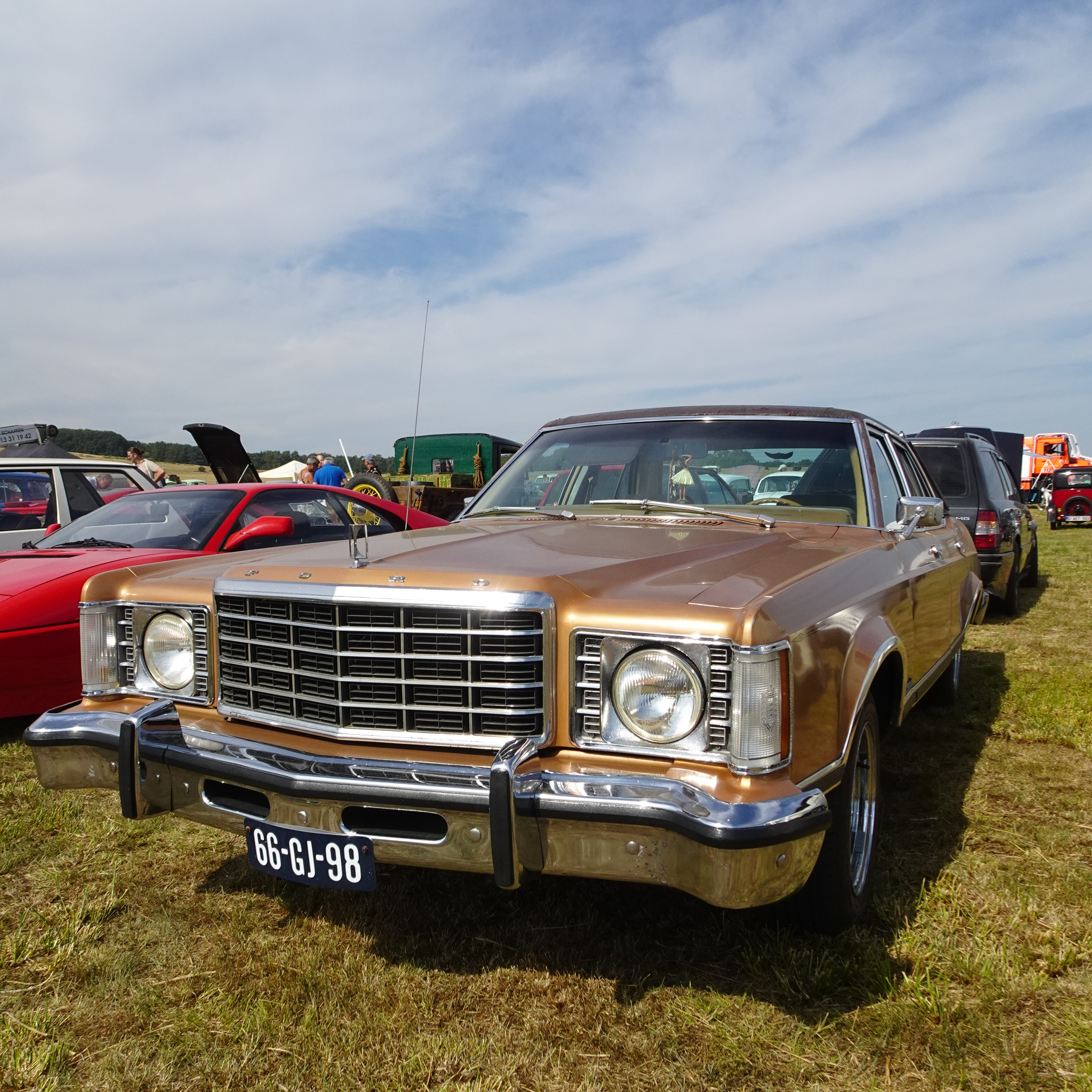
Pre-facelift Granada Ghia sedan

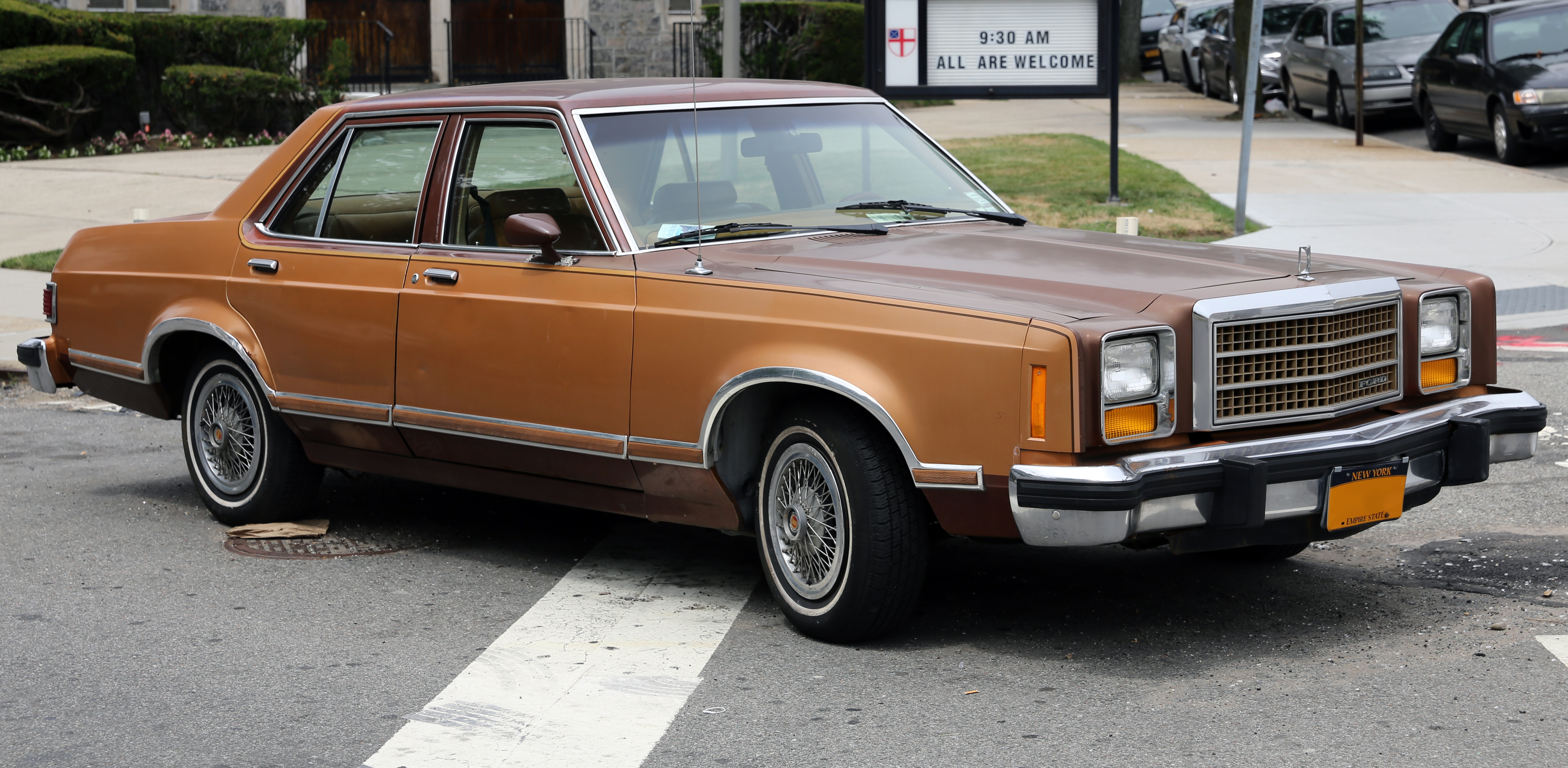
1980 Granada sedan

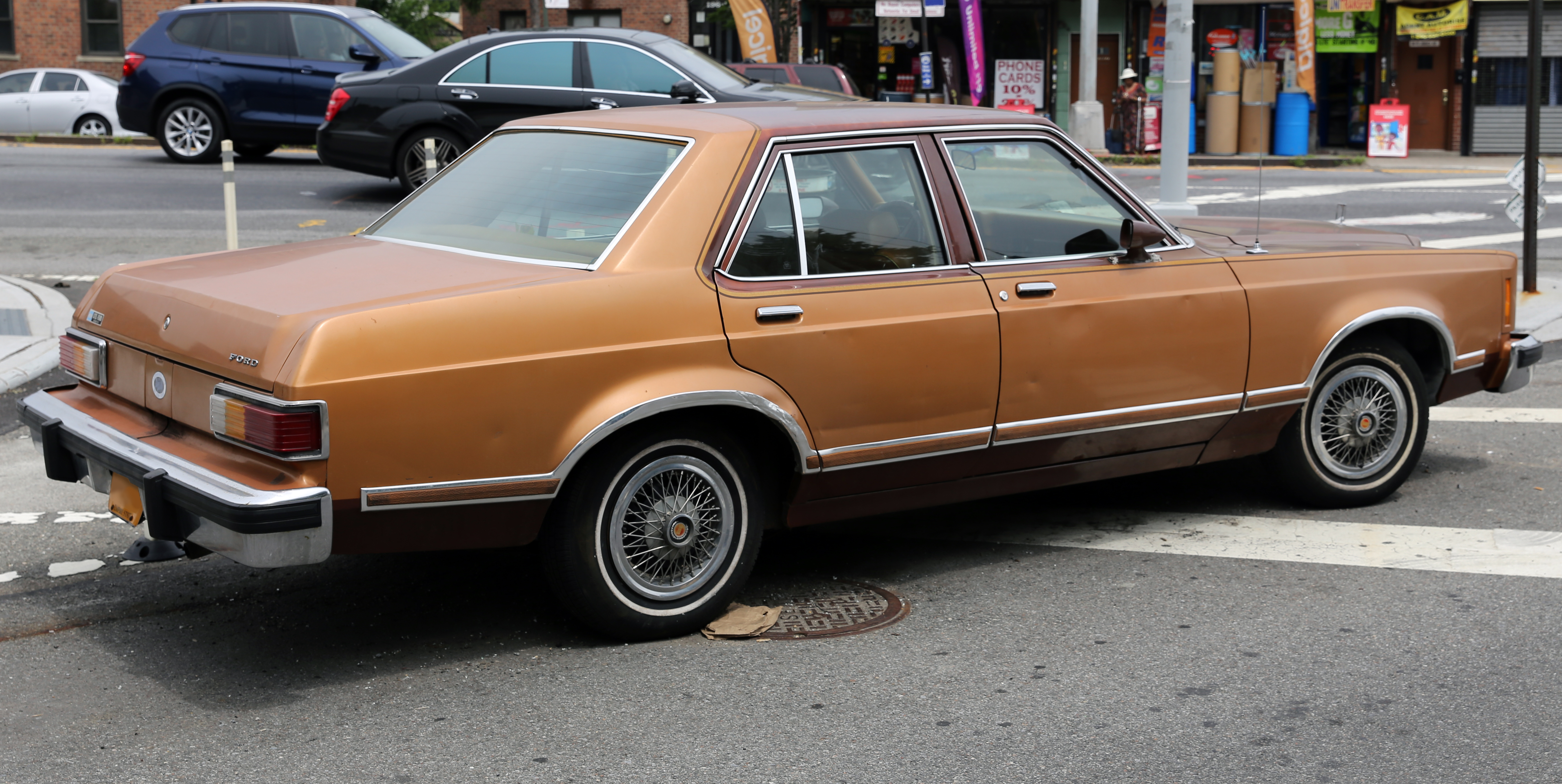
1980 Granada sedan

=== Trim ===
In addition to the unnamed base-trim level produced during model years 1975 to 1980, Ford offered the first-generation Ford Granada in three additional trim levels during its production. In a break from Ford nomenclature, two Ford Granada trim levels shared names with their Mercury Monarch equivalent.

During model years 1976 to 1977, the Granada was sold in a Sports Coupe trim (the Monarch equivalent was the Monarch S). In addition to cosmetic upgrades (styled steel wheels, exterior striping, bucket seats, and interior trim) the Sports Coupe was given heavy-duty suspension and larger front brakes. A 1977½ variation on the Granada Sports Coupe, produced from May 1977 through the end of the model year, featured blacked-out molding, modified trim, taillights, and color selections.

As a replacement for the Sports Coupe, Ford introduced the Ford Granada ESS, or European Sport Sedan, produced from 1978 to 1980 (Mercury also sold a Monarch ESS). Distinguished by its blacked-out exterior trim, the Granada/Monarch ESS featured bucket seats with a floor-mounted shifter as standard equipment (though a bench seat was optional). The ESS option included standard color-keyed wheelcovers (styled-steel wheels were optional) and unique opera-window louvres for coupes. As part of the marketing for the ESS trim line, Ford visually compared the Granada to the Mercedes-Benz W123.

The top trim level of the Granada was the Granada Ghia (a name shared with both its European counterpart and the Mercury Monarch). Externally distinguished by a vinyl roof, the Ghia received an upgraded interior; with either cloth or leather seats offered as options, along with a wood-trimmed dashboard.

Ford did not offer its own equivalent of the 1975 to 1976 Mercury Grand Monarch Ghia; the trim line was repackaged as the Lincoln Versailles for 1977.

== Second generation (1981–1982) ==
Second generation
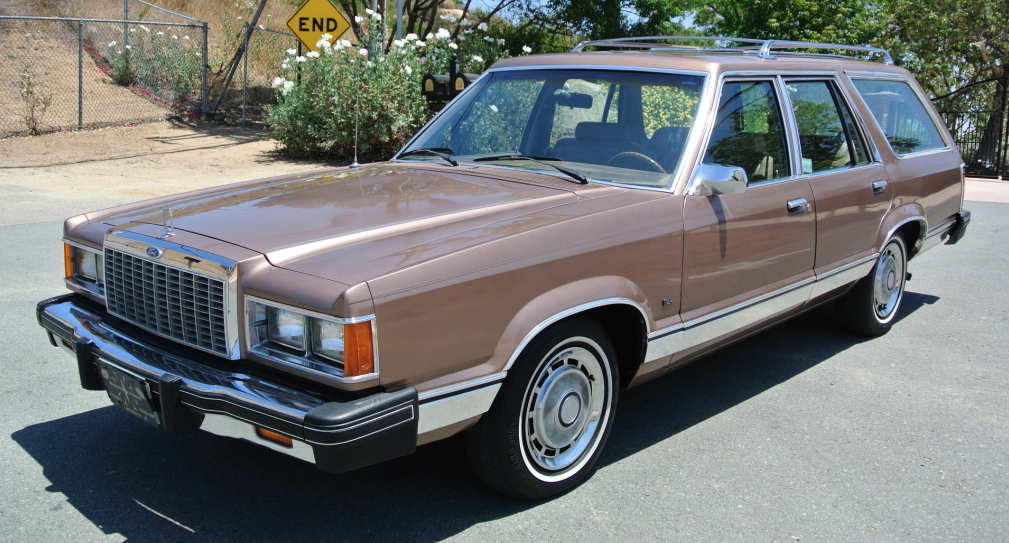
- 1982 Granada GL station wagon

Overview
- Model years: 1981–1982
- Assembly: United States: Hapeville, Georgia (Atlanta Assembly); United States: Chicago, Illinois (Chicago Assembly)

Body and chassis
- Body style: 2-door coupe 4-door sedan 5-door station wagon
- Platform: Ford Fox platform
- Related: Ford Fairmont; Ford Thunderbird; Mercury Cougar; Mercury Cougar XR-7; Mercury Zephyr; Lincoln Mark VII; Lincoln Continental

Powertrain
- Engine: 2.3 L (140 cu in) Lima I4; 3.3 L (200 cu in) Thriftpower I6; 3.8 L (232 cu in) Essex V6; 4.2 L (255 cu in) Windsor V8
- Transmission: 4-speed manual 4-speed AOD automatic 3-speed C4 automatic 3-speed C5 automatic

Dimensions
- Wheelbase: 105.5 in (2,680 mm)
- Length: 196.5 in (4,991 mm)
- Width: 71.0 in (1,803 mm)
- Height: 54.2 in (1,377 mm)

Chronology
- Predecessor: Ford LTD II
- Successor: Ford LTD (Sedan & Station Wagon)

For the 1981 model year, Ford introduced a second generation of the Granada. Slotted between the Fairmont and the LTD in the Ford model line, the Granada was redesigned as a premium version of the Fairmont. While the model line shifted to the larger mid-size segment, its exterior footprint would decrease in size; though far less extensive than the downsizing applied to the 1979 Ford LTD, the 1981 Granada shed an inch in length, four inches in wheelbase length, and approximately 300 pounds of curb weight (depending on powertrain).

For the 1983 model year, as part of a major realignment of the Ford and Mercury product lines, the Granada nameplate was withdrawn. As part of a mid-cycle revision, the model line effectively continued as the Ford LTD (the LTD Crown Victoria remaining as full-size sedan). Following the 1986 model year, the mid-size Ford LTD was displaced by the Ford Taurus as Ford shifted its mid-size sedans to front-wheel drive.

=== Chassis ===
The second-generation Ford Granada is based on the rear-wheel drive Ford Fox platform, sharing its 105.5-inch wheelbase with the Ford Fairmont and Mercury Zephyr.

In the shift from the Ford Falcon chassis (dating from 1960) to the Fox chassis, the suspension and steering systems were modernized. In line with all Fox-platform vehicles, the second-generation Granada used MacPherson strut front suspension (replacing short/long-arm suspension) with a coil-sprung live rear axle (replacing leaf springs). A rack-and-pinion steering system was introduced, replacing the previous recirculating-ball system. While the optional four-wheel disc brakes and anti-lock brakes were discontinued, power brakes became standard equipment.

Shared with the Fairmont, a 2.3-L Lima inline-four was the standard engine, with a 3.3-L inline-six (the Ford 200 six, under metric displacement) as an option. For 1982, the inline-six was replaced by a 3.8-L Ford Essex V6. A 4.2-L V8 became an option (replacing the 4.9-L V8 of the Fairmont). While an automatic transmission was standard for all engines, the 2.3-L engine was available with a four-speed manual transmission.

=== Body ===
The second-generation Ford Granada was offered in three body styles. For 1981, the Granada was introduced as a two-door and four door sedan. For 1982, a five-door station wagon was introduced transferring the body style from the Fairmont line.

In a break from the previous generation, the second-generation Granada shifted away from European-influenced styling, sharing many visible body parts with the Fairmont (including the doors). To distinguish the two model lines, the Granada received a formal notchback roofline (for both two-door and four-door sedans); the front and rear fascias were styled in line with larger Ford vehicles.

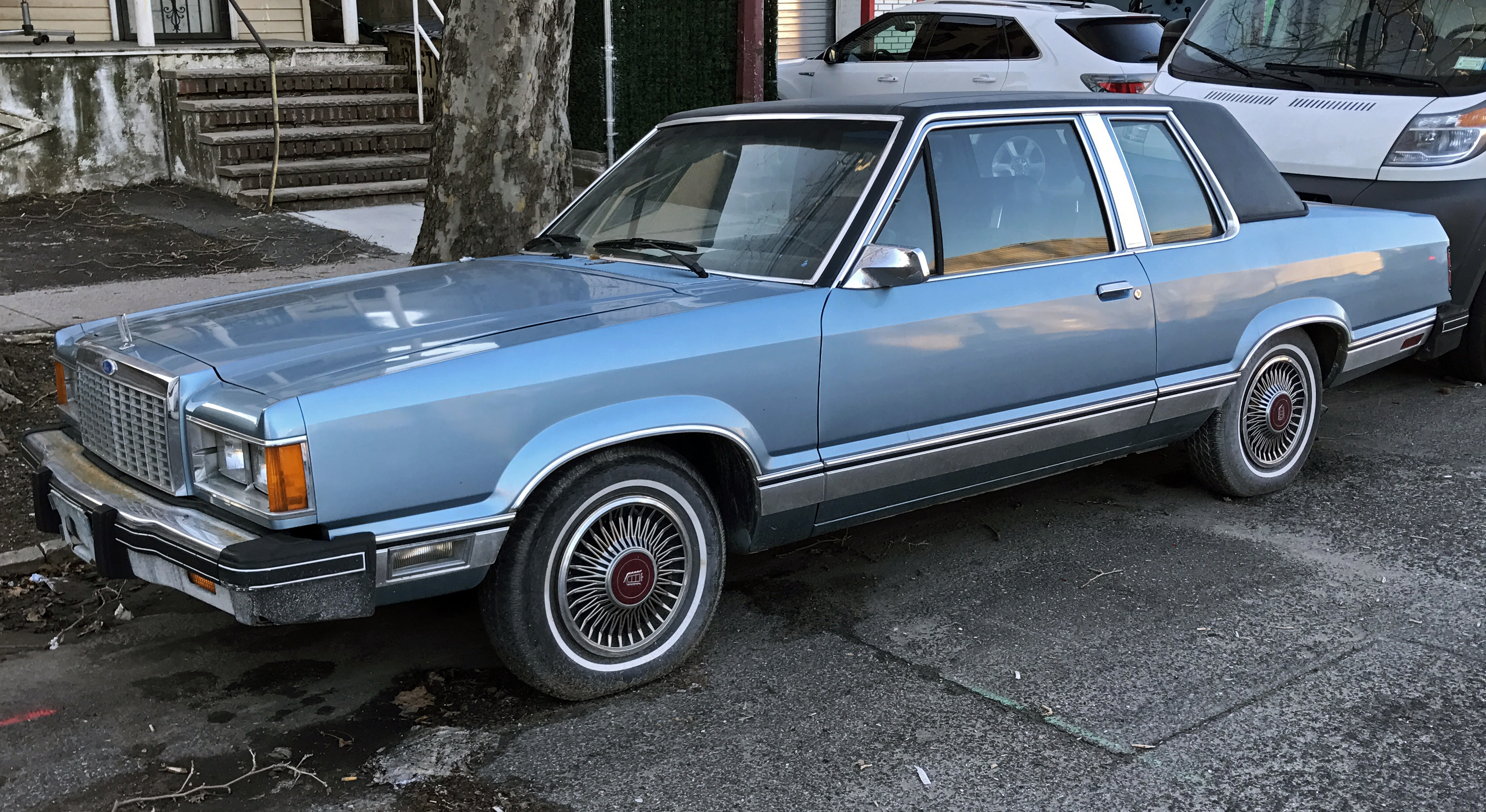
1982 Granada L two-door sedan

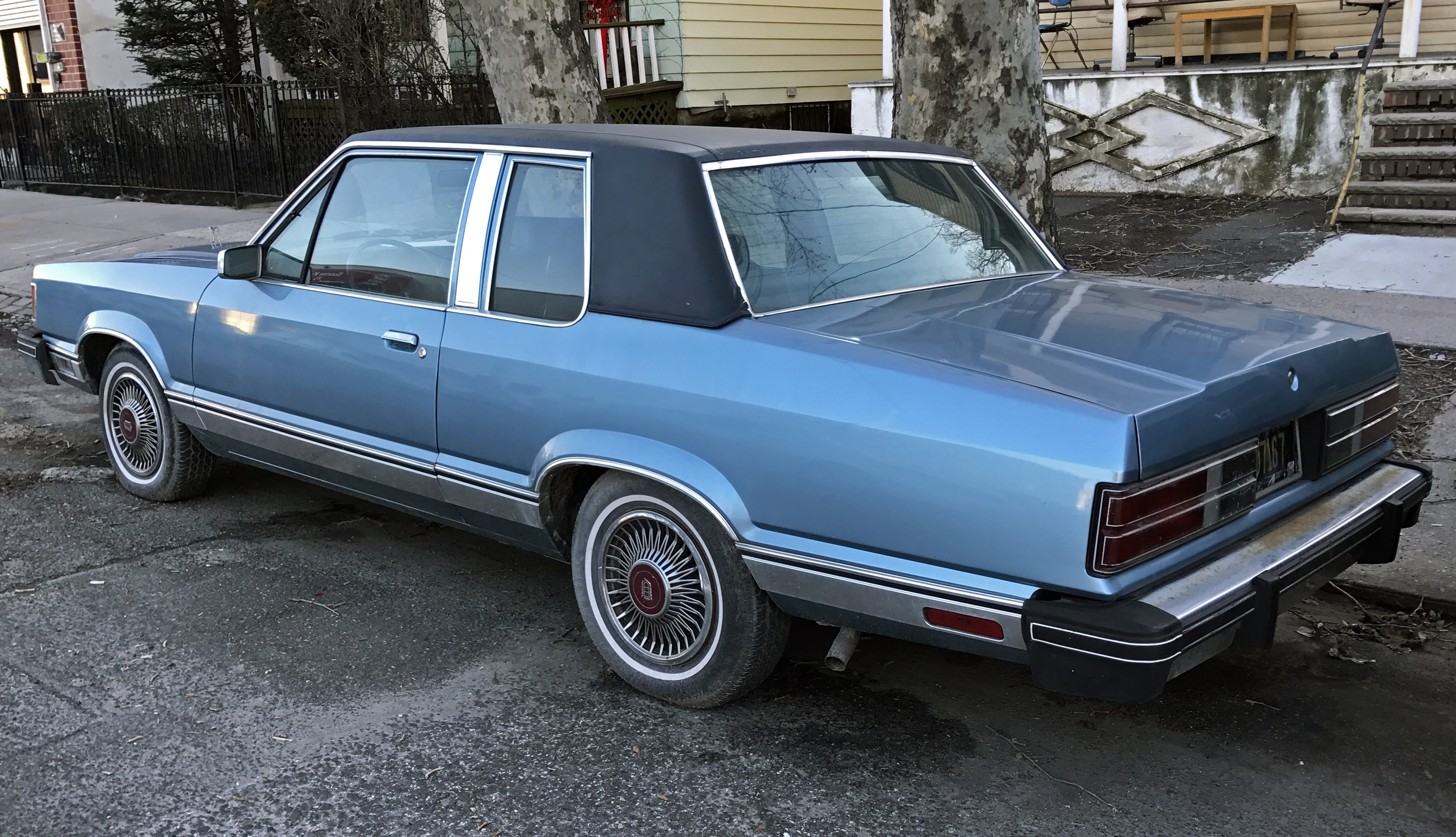
1982 Granada L two-door sedan

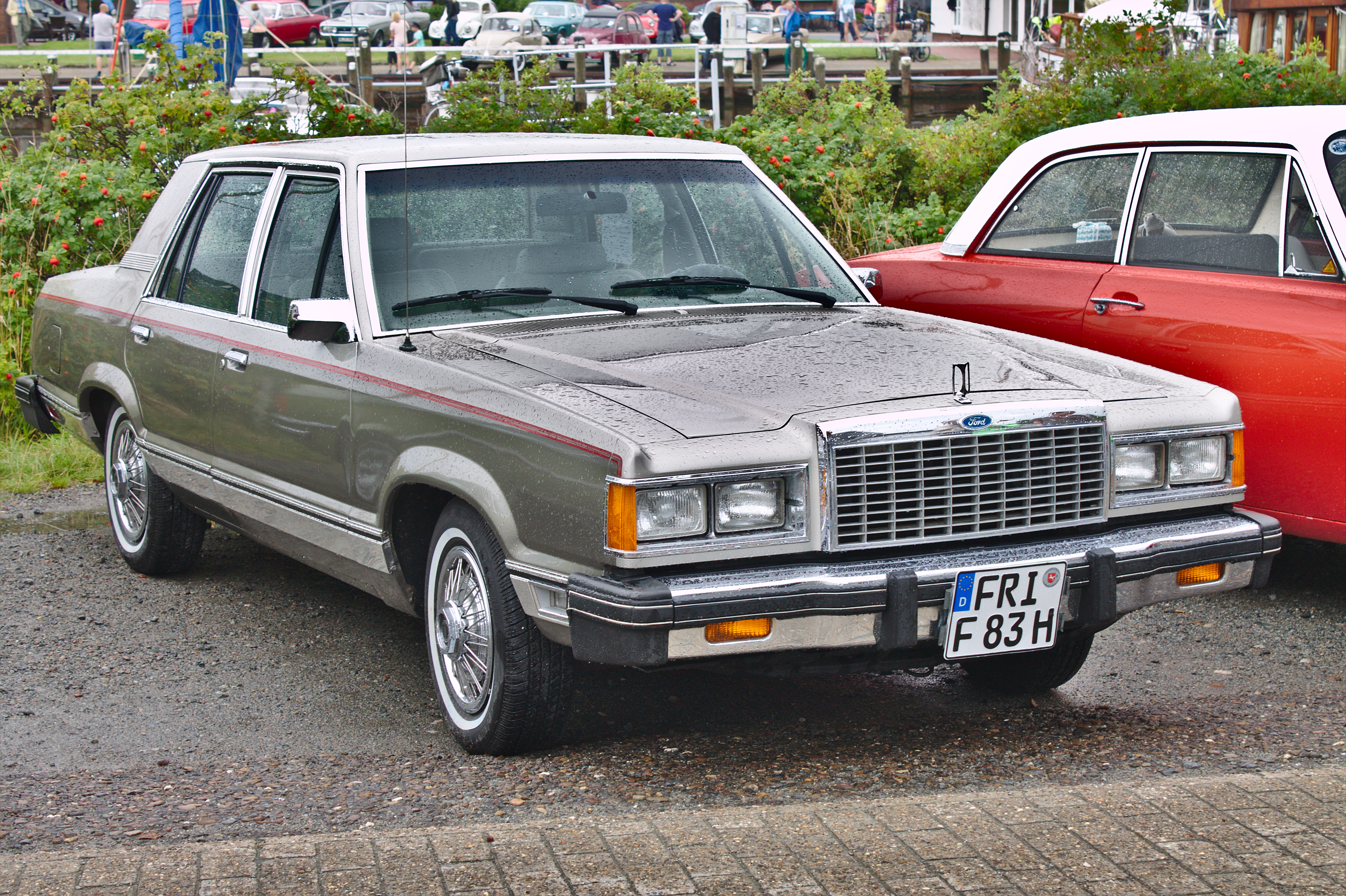
1982 Granada GL four-door sedan

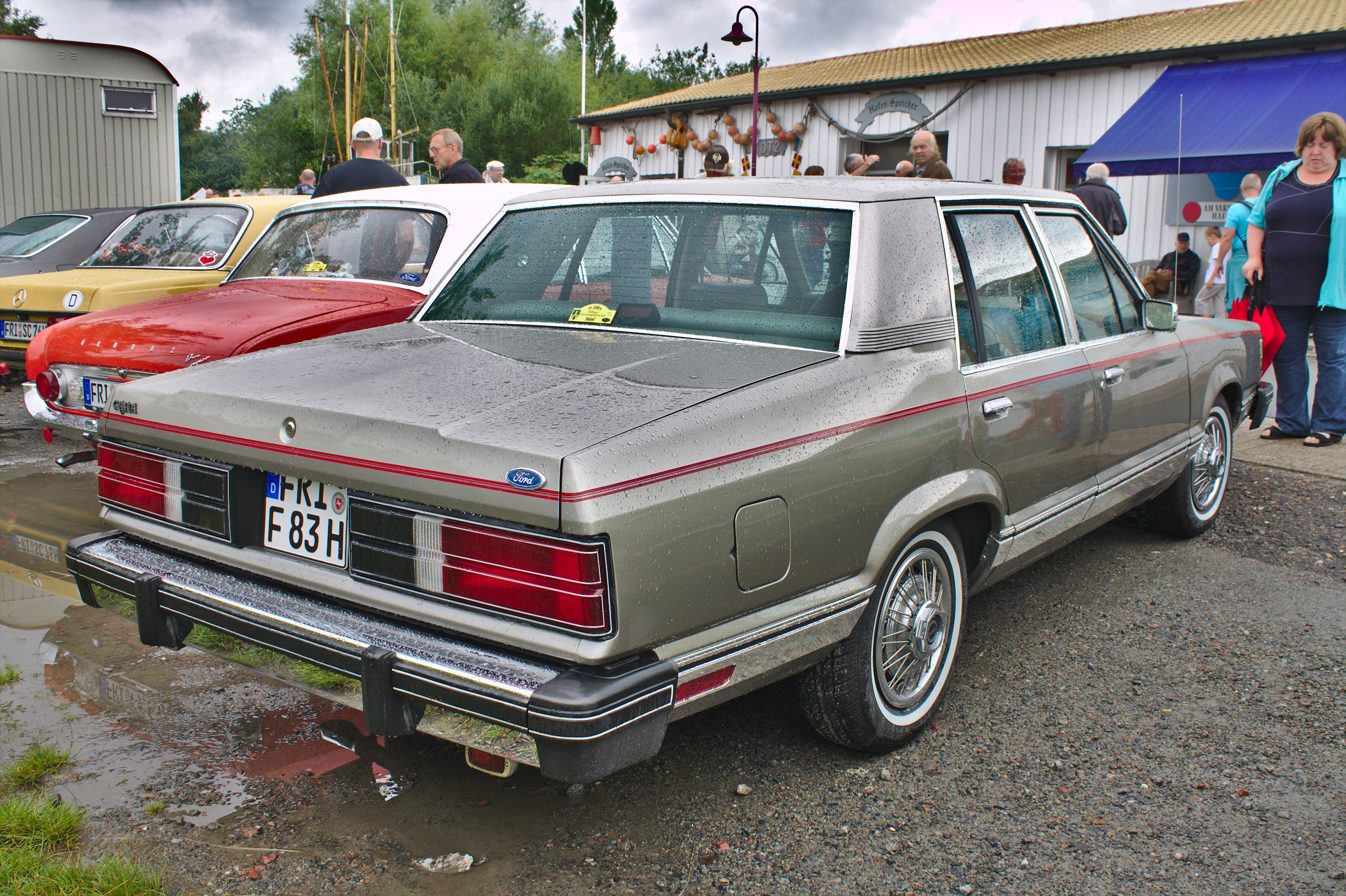
1982 Granada GL four-door sedan

=== Trim ===
The second-generation Ford Granada was offered in three trim levels, in line with other Ford vehicles of the 1980s (including the Ford Escort and the later Ford Tempo and Ford Taurus). The base trim was the Granada L, with the mid-level Granada GL. Effectively replacing both the Granada ESS and Ghia, the Granada GLX was the top trim level.

=== Blue oval return ===
As a minor historical note the 1982 Ford Granada was among the first U.S. Ford vehicles to mark the return of the Ford blue oval exterior emblem. Although stamped on door threshold trim on Ford-division (and Continental Mark series) cars for many years, the blue oval had been absent on vehicle exteriors in North America since the 1930s. The blue oval had remained in wide use as the company corporate logo in sales literature, advertisements, owners manuals and on dealership signs.

Beginning in 1976, the blue oval emblem saw a return on cars and trucks produced by Ford of Europe and Ford of Australia. For 1983, only the Ford Fairmont (in its final model year) and Ford Thunderbird (produced with its own exterior emblems) were left without the blue oval emblem in North America.

== Variants ==
During its production, the North American Ford Granada was also marketed by the Lincoln-Mercury, with the division selling three counterparts of the model line. The first generation was sold as the Mercury Monarch and Lincoln Versailles; the second generation by Mercury as the Mercury Cougar (replacing the Monarch).

=== Mercury Monarch (1975–1980) ===
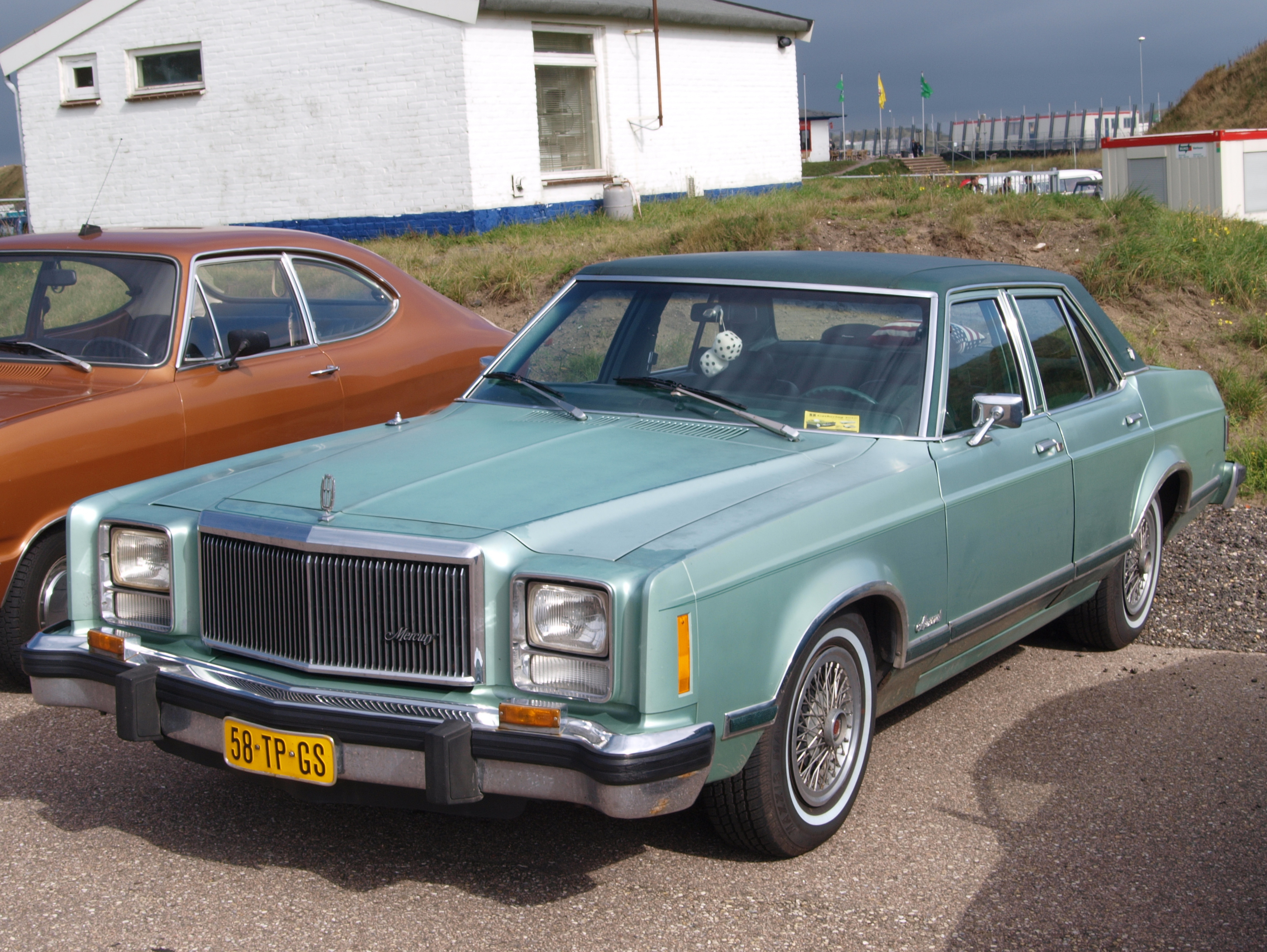
1979 Mercury Monarch

Introduced alongside the Ford Granada in 1975, the Mercury Monarch was slotted above the mechanically-similar Mercury Comet. Nearly externally identical to the Granada, the Monarch received its own grille, fascia trim, and interior trim. The trim nomenclature was common between both lines, with both offered in top-level Ghia trim.

As a Mercury-exclusive model, the Grand Monarch Ghia was marketed as a junior version of the (far larger) Mercury Grand Marquis, including virtually every available feature as standard equipment. For 1977, the Grand Monarch Ghia was repackaged as a Lincoln, becoming the Lincoln Versailles.

=== Mercury Cougar (1980–1982) ===
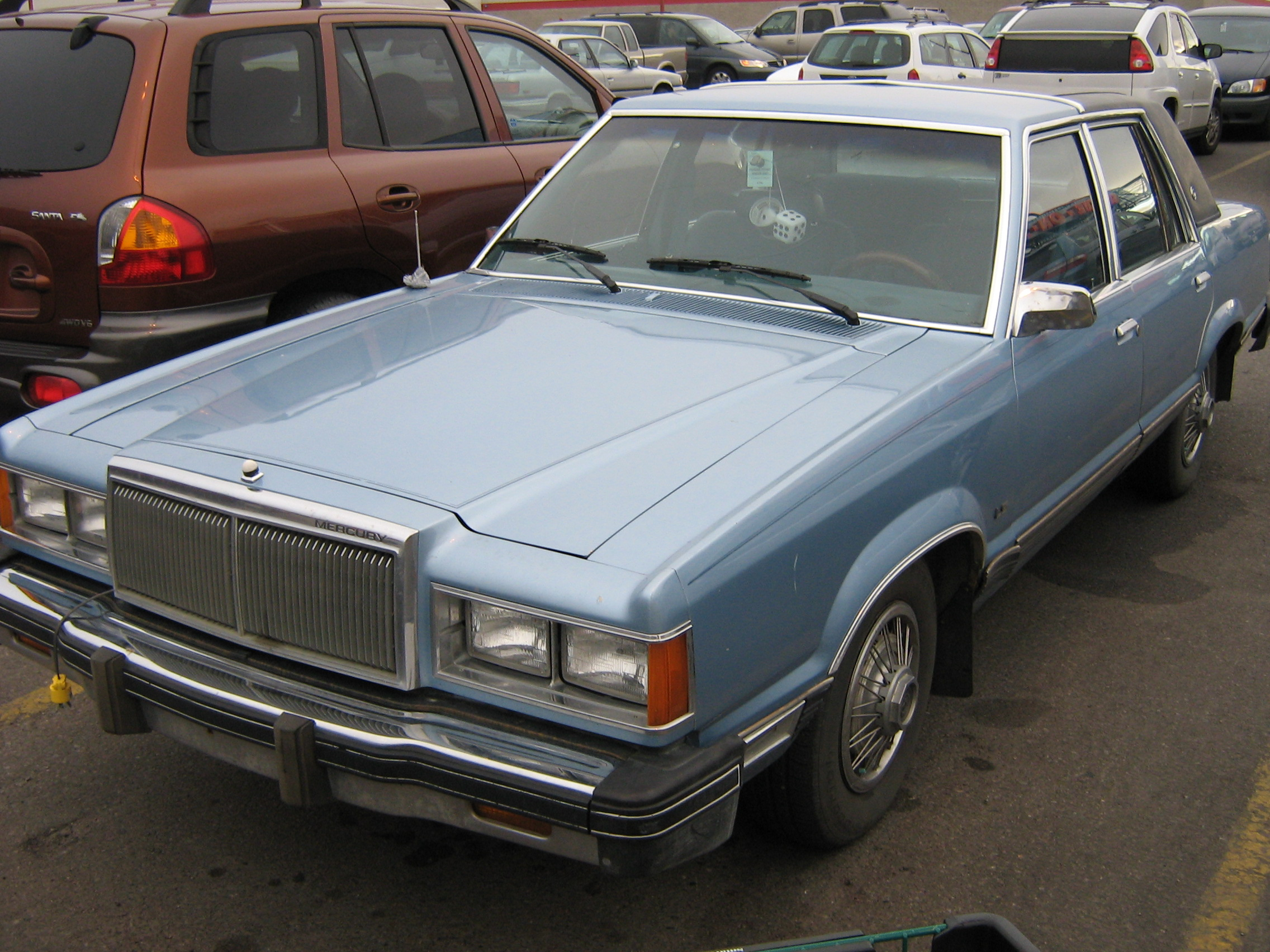
1981 Mercury Cougar LS

For 1980, for its fifth generation, Mercury shifted the Cougar from the intermediate Ford Torino chassis to the mid-size Ford Fox chassis, paring the model line solely down to the Cougar XR7 coupe. Marketed alongside the 1980 Ford Thunderbird, the downsizing was poorly received in the marketplace; sales of the 1980 Cougar collapsed (falling nearly 65% from 1979).

For 1981, Mercury expanded the Cougar from the XR7 coupe to its entire mid-size model range. Replacing the Monarch, the 1981 Cougar added two-door and four-door sedans to its model range as Mercury counterparts of the Granada; a Cougar station wagon was introduced (adopted from the Mercury Zephyr) for 1982.

In line with the previous-generation Monarch, the Cougar sedan/station wagon were nearly externally identical to their Ford Granada counterparts (differing only with grilles, taillamps, and badging). The 1980-1982 Cougar/Cougar XR7 marked the introduction of GS/LS trim nomenclature for Mercury, used from the 1980s into the early 2000s.

For 1983, Mercury returned the Cougar back into a single two-door body design following a complete redesign of the exterior. In line with the Granada becoming the Ford LTD, the previous Cougar sedan/wagon was repackaged as the Mercury Marquis. As Ford transitioned its model lines to front-wheel drive, the Marquis was ultimately displaced by the Mercury Sable after 1986 model year.

=== Lincoln Versailles (1977–1980) ===
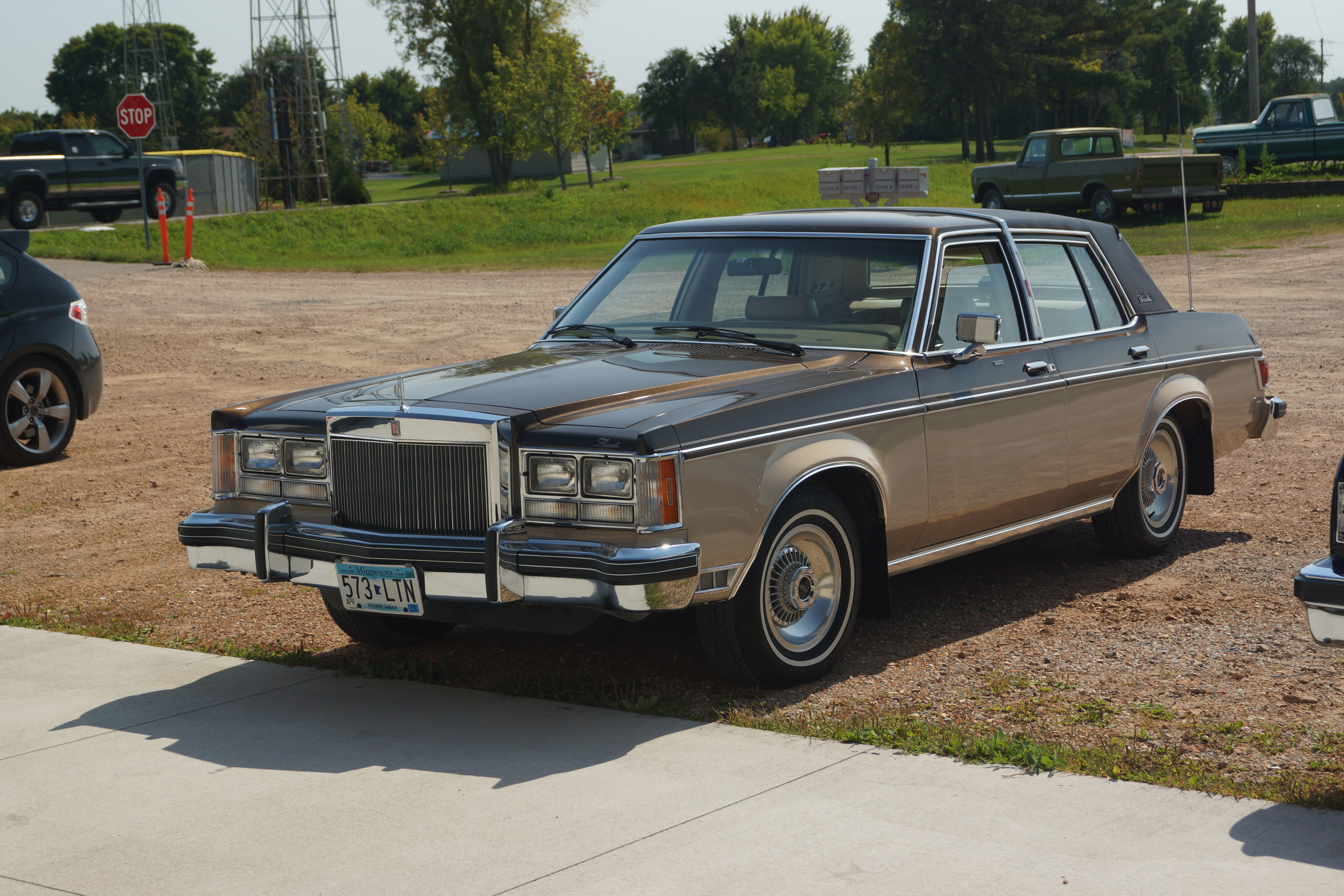
1979 Lincoln Versailles

For 1977, Lincoln-Mercury repackaged the Mercury Grand Monarch Ghia (a personal car of Henry Ford II) as the Lincoln Versailles. The first Lincoln in 17 years not to use the Continental nameplate, the Versailles was developed in response to the Cadillac Seville compact/mid-size luxury sedan. In line with its Cadillac counterpart, while the smallest Lincoln ever produced at the time, the Versailles was the highest-price vehicle sold by the division, undergoing a strict quality-control regimen during assembly and including nearly all available features as standard equipment. In a first for the American automobile industry, the Lincoln Versailles was assembled with clearcoat paint and halogen headlamps. The Versailles was also not constructed at the Lincoln Wixom Assembly factory which was exclusively devoted to Lincoln vehicles since it was opened in 1957.

Alongside the later Cadillac Cimarron, the Lincoln Versailles is viewed among the most controversial examples of badge engineering in the automotive industry. While sold in the same Lincoln-Mercury showroom as the Mercury Monarch, the Versailles was priced at nearly twice the cost of its Mercury counterpart; with the exception of its halogen headlights, clear coat paint finish and Continental-tire trunklid, the Versailles was nearly indistinguishable from the Monarch (itself, nearly identical to a Granada).

Selling far under sales projections, the Versailles was withdrawn early in the 1980 model year.

== Production ==
Ford Granada Production Figures
	Coupe	Sedan	Wagon	Yearly Total
1975	140,838	161,820	-	302,658
1976	208,404	340,380	-	548,784
1977	191,778	198,801	-	390,579
1978	110,481	139,305	-	249,786
1979	76,850	105,526	-	182,376
1980	60,872	29,557	-	90,429
1981	35,057	86,284	-	121,341
1982	12,802	62,339	45,182	120,323
Total	837,082	1,124,012	45,182	2,006,276

== Ford Granada in Venezuela (1983–1985) ==
Versions of the 1983–1986 North American Ford LTD manufactured in Venezuela continued using the Granada name complete with uplevel Elite badged versions.
