= Mercury Monarch =

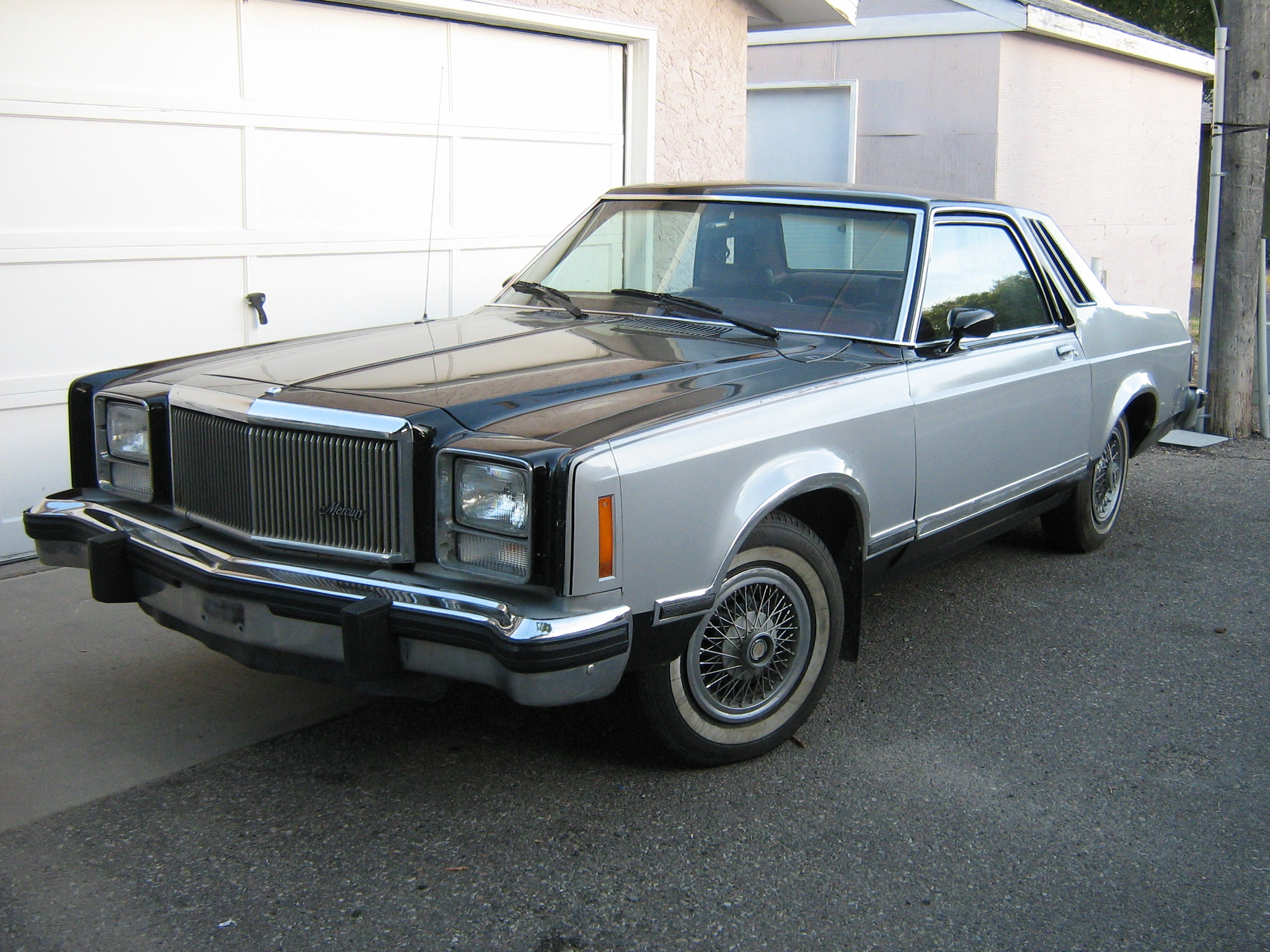
- 1978–1980 Monarch coupe

Overview
- Manufacturer: Mercury (Ford)
- Model years: 1975–1980
- Assembly: Mahwah, New Jersey; Wayne, Michigan

Body and chassis
- Class: Compact near-luxury car
- Body style: 4-door sedan 2-door coupe
- Layout: FR layout
- Related: Ford Granada (North America); Lincoln Versailles

Powertrain
- Engine: 200 cu in (3.3 L) I6; 250 cu in (4.1 L) I6; 302 cu in (4.9 L) Windsor V8; 351 cu in (5.8 L) Windsor V8

Chronology
- Successor: Mercury Cougar (1981)

The Mercury Monarch is a compact automobile that was marketed by the Mercury division of Ford from the 1975 to 1980 model years. Designed as the original successor for the Mercury Comet, the Monarch was marketed as a luxury compact vehicle; alongside its Ford Granada counterpart, the Monarch expanded the segment in the United States as automakers responded to the 1973 fuel crisis.

Taking its name from a former marque of Ford Canada, the Mercury Monarch was slotted between the compact Comet and the Montego in the Mercury model line (later, the Zephyr and Cougar). Sharing many of its chassis underpinnings with the Comet, the Monarch marked the final evolution of the 1960–1965 Ford Falcon chassis architecture. The Monarch was also the counterpart of the 1977–1980 Lincoln Versailles sedan.

In total, 575,567 Monarchs were produced. Ford assembled the model line alongside the Granada at Mahwah Assembly (Mahwah, New Jersey) and Wayne Stamping & Assembly (Wayne, Michigan). For 1981, the Monarch was discontinued after a single generation, with the Mercury counterpart of the Granada taking on the Cougar (and ultimately, Marquis) nameplate.

== Development ==
The Mercury Monarch was developed as external circumstances outside of Ford Motor Company's control forced major changes in consumer buying habits. The 1973 fuel crisis and new engine power sapping emissions standards would lead to buyers valuing luxury over performance, with fuel economy becoming a key attribute. Originally developed as an extensively updated Mercury Comet for the 1975 model year, the more upscale redesign was instead renamed Mercury Monarch. The Ford division also introduced its own redesigned Maverick, the Granada. As Ford Motor Company predicted the compact segment would grow in sales, the existing Comet/Maverick would remain in production. To differentiate Granada/Monarch from the Maverick/Comet, Ford offered the new-generation compact-segment vehicles with a higher than usual level of equipment, comfort and convenience features.

Although General Motors had earlier introduced the Buick Apollo (later Skylark) and Oldsmobile Omega in 1973, the Granada/Monarch became one of the few vehicles that would break a long-standing tradition within American auto manufacturers of associating size with luxury.

== Overview ==
=== Chassis ===
As with the Ford Granada, the Mercury Monarch shared its unibody chassis with its Ford Maverick/Mercury Comet predecessors. Based heavily on the first-generation Ford Falcon from 1960, the design utilized coil spring front suspension with a leaf-sprung live rear axle; due to its Falcon origins, the Monarch was also loosely mechanically related to the first-generation Ford Mustang and Mercury Cougar.

The base engine was a 200 cu in (3.3 L) inline six-cylinder engine, with a 250 cu in (4.1 L) inline six optional. V8 power came from one of two options: the 302 cu in (4.9 L) or 351 cu in (5.8 L) Windsor engines.

=== Body ===
Although originally developed to become a new Mercury Comet, the Mercury Monarch was differentiated from the Comet produced alongside it in a number of ways. Using the Mercedes-Benz 280 as a benchmark for its styling and interior packaging, the Monarch abandoned the Coke bottle styling of the Comet for straighter-edged body panels. In the front, the Monarch adapted much of the styling of Mercury's large full size Marquis (with the exception of single exposed headlights). While the roofline of the four-door model was heavily influenced by Mercedes-Benz, the two-door was given its own roofline with vertical opera windows. The rear featured horizontal wrap-around taillamps with amber reflectors and a color-keyed decorative trim panel with a fuel filler door.

In 1978, the Monarch underwent an exterior facelift; the headlamps were converted from round to rectangular, with the turn signals moved under the headlamps. The taillamps were revised to all red lenses and the center rear trim panel was changed to a new design with an argent finish on base models or a matching red reflector on top trim levels.

On the inside, in contrast from other Lincoln-Mercury cars, the Monarch was equipped with front bucket seats. While a feature associated with sporty cars at the time, the individual seats (from the European Ford Granada) were chosen for their support and range of adjustment. Unlike its fully instrumented European competitors, the wood-trimmed dashboard of the Monarch was only equipped with three instruments – a speedometer, fuel gauge, and a clock – along with a suite of warning lights.

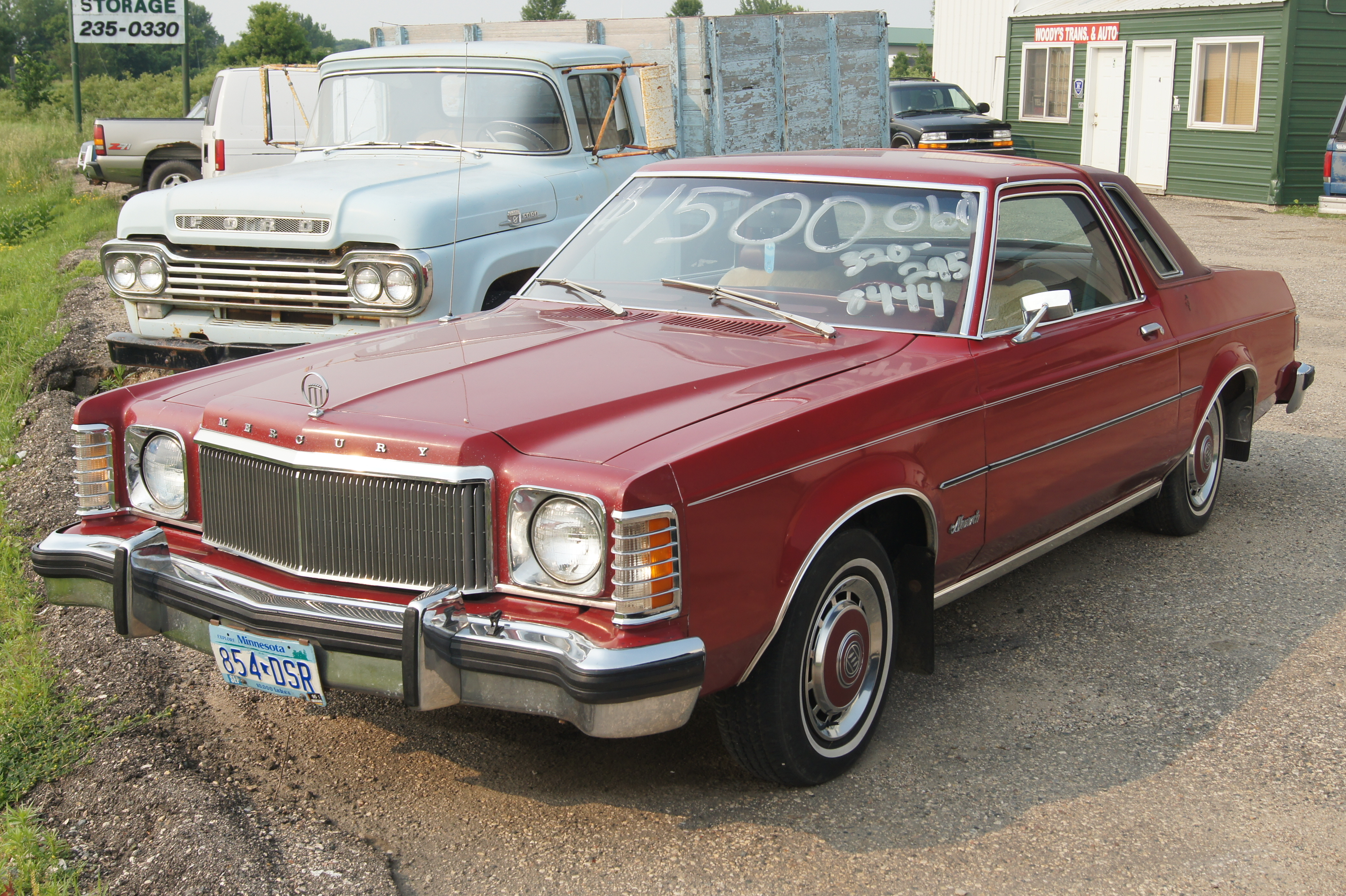
1975–1978 Mercury Monarch coupe

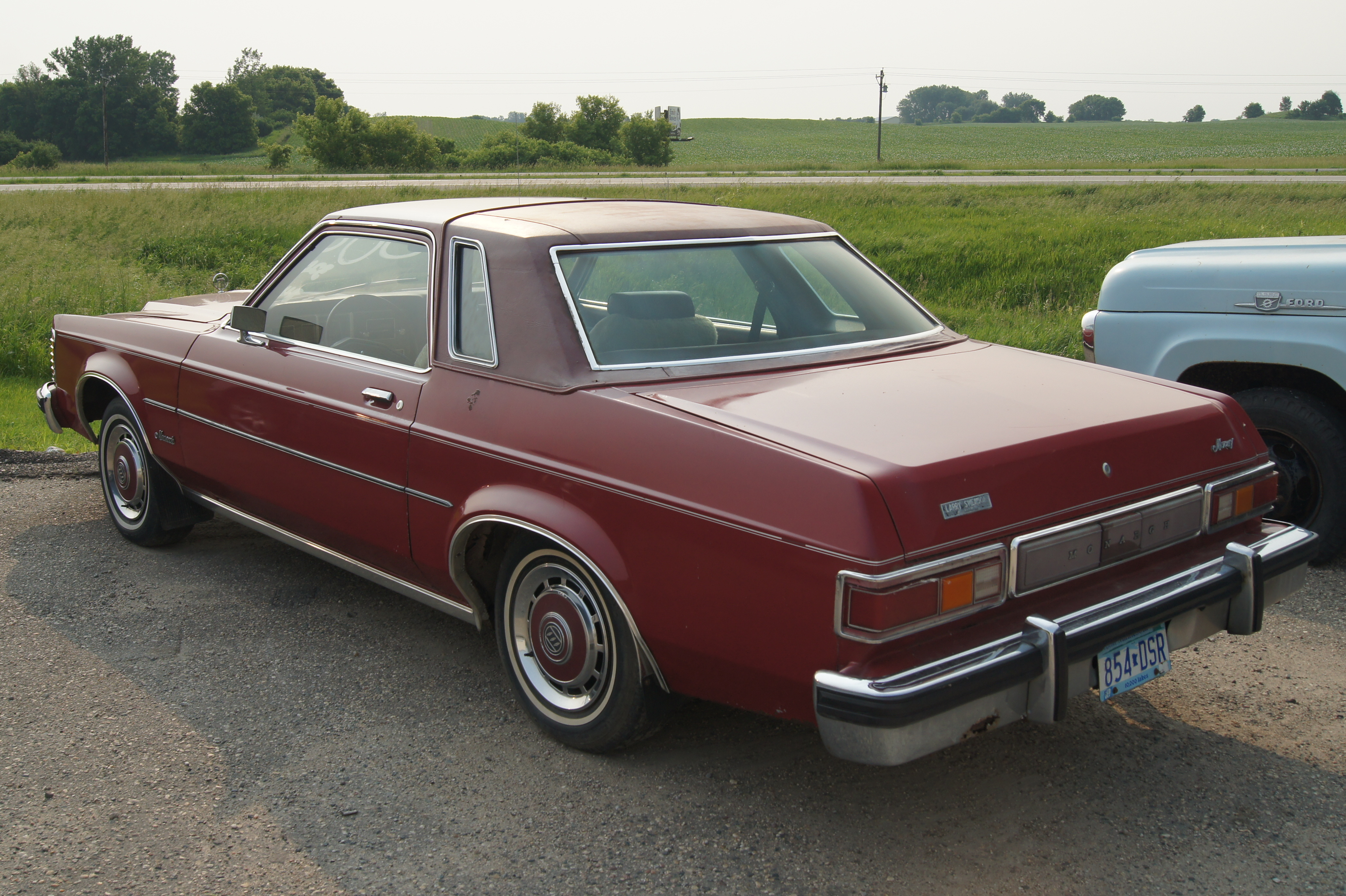
1975–1978 Mercury Monarch coupe

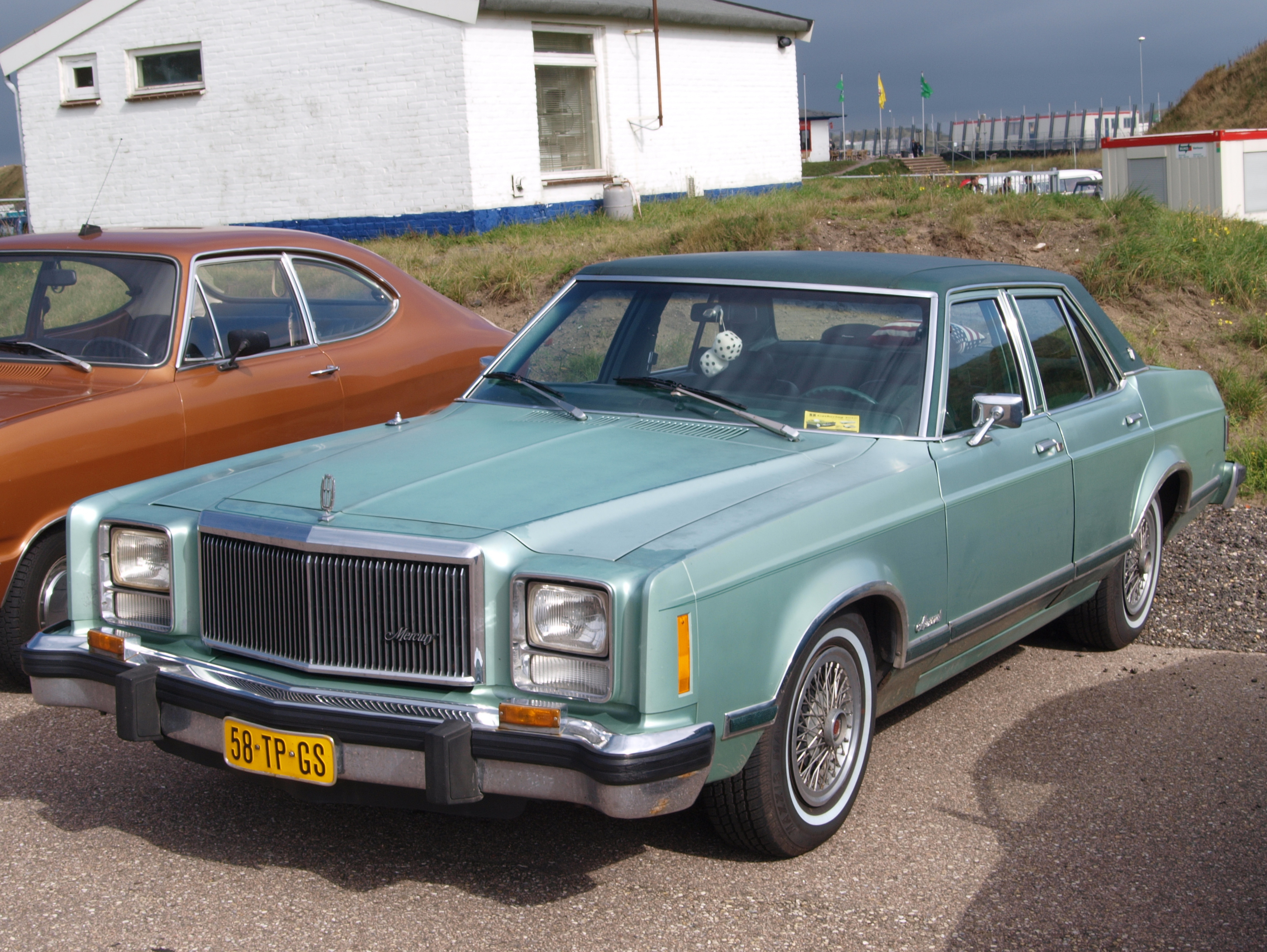
1978–1980 Mercury Monarch sedan

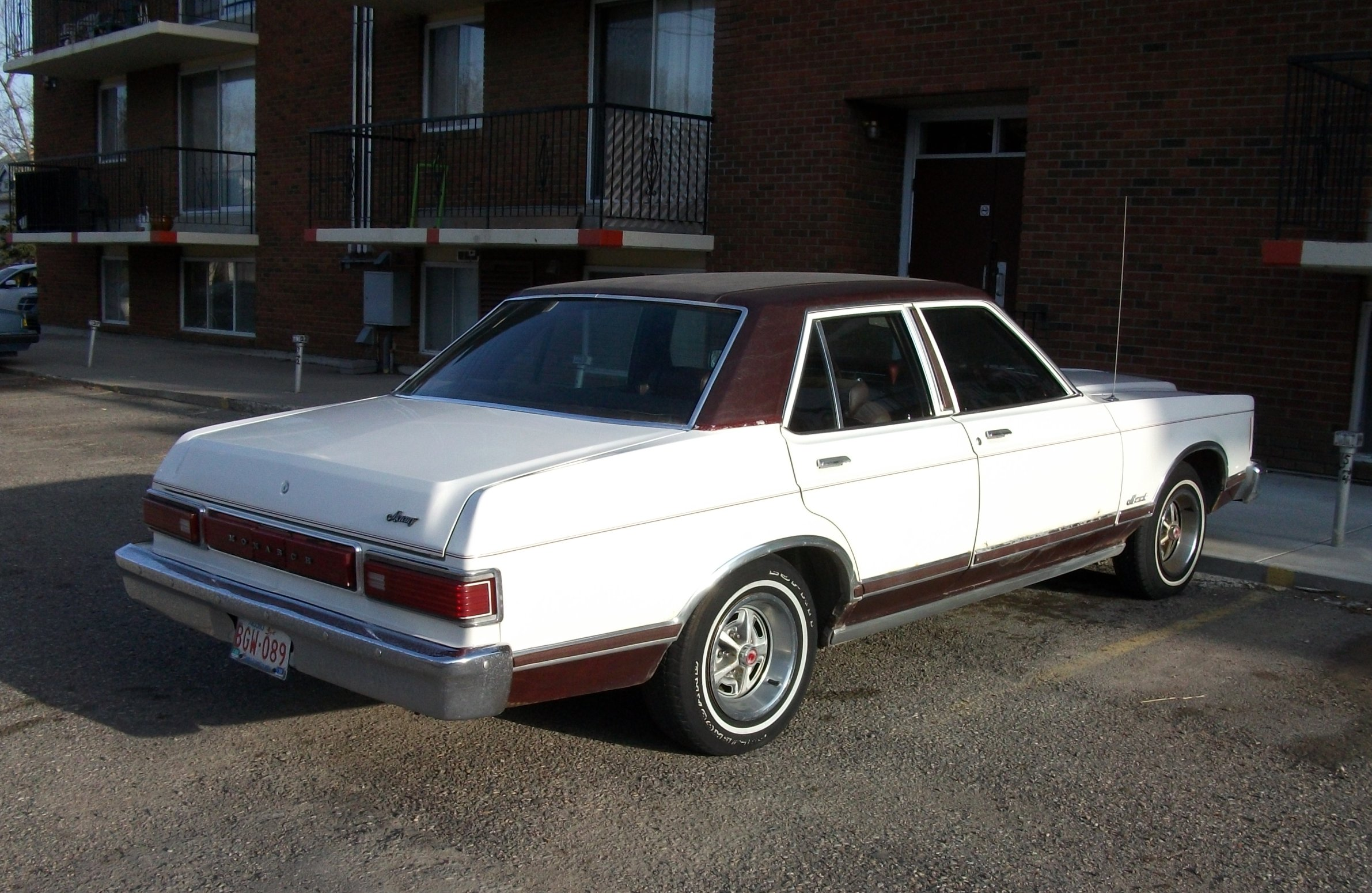
1978–1980 Mercury Monarch sedan

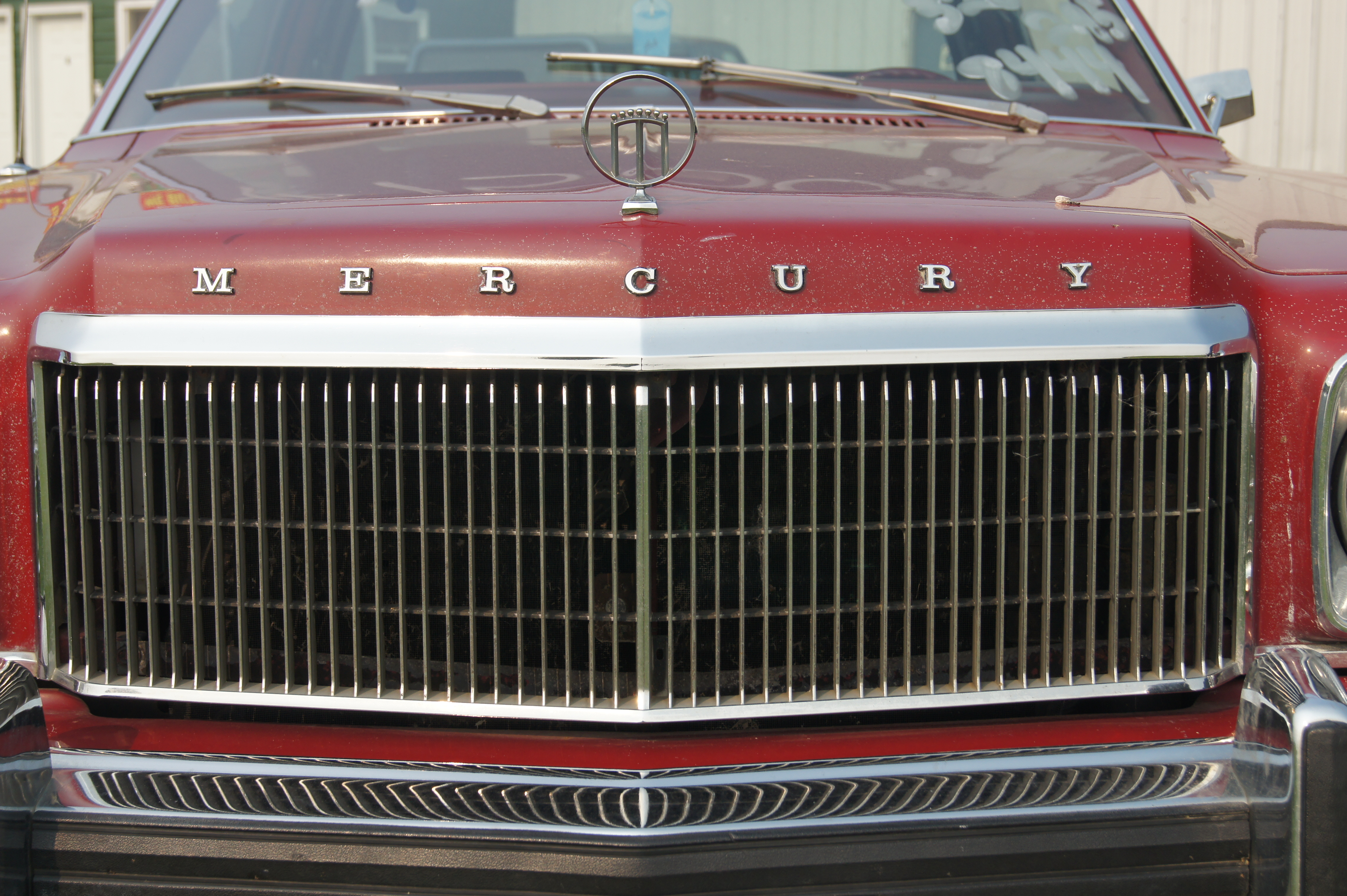
Grille and hood ornament

=== Trim ===
At its launch, the Monarch was available in two trim levels: base and Ghia. For 1977, the two-door coupe was produced in an S (Sports Coupe) trim. For 1978 and 1979, the ESS (European Sports Sedan) trim was available, distinguished by blacked-out exterior trim.

==== Grand Monarch Ghia ====
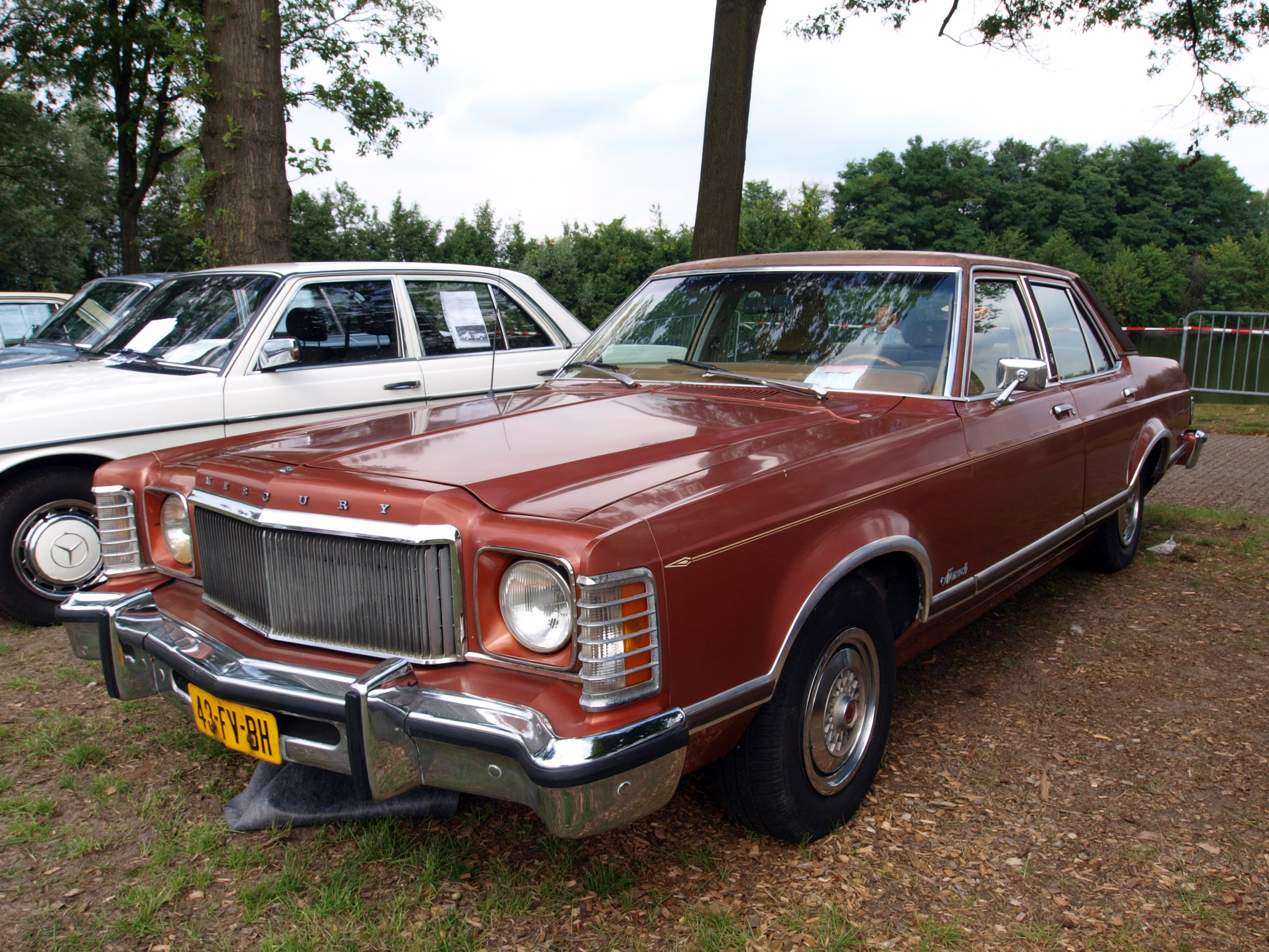
1975 Mercury Grand Monarch Ghia

The Mercury Grand Monarch Ghia was offered from 1975 to 1976, marketed as the highest-trim version of the Monarch. Adopting many features shared with the larger Marquis and Grand Marquis, the Grand Monarch Ghia offered a sophisticated central hydraulic power system and four-wheel disc brakes not used on the standard Monarch or Granada. According to the May 1976 edition of Car and Driver, three out of five of Ford top executives, including Henry Ford II, used the Mercury Grand Monarch Ghia as their personal car.

Other standard Grand Monarch Ghia features included:

- Leather trim
- Vinyl roof
- LCD clock
- Leather-wrapped steering wheel
- Power steering
- Dual map lights
- Illuminated visor vanity mirror (passenger side)
- 14-inch cast-aluminum spoke wheels
- Solid-state ignition
- Whitewall steel-belted radial tires
- Reclining bucket seats with matching map pockets
- Plusher carpeting and soundproofing

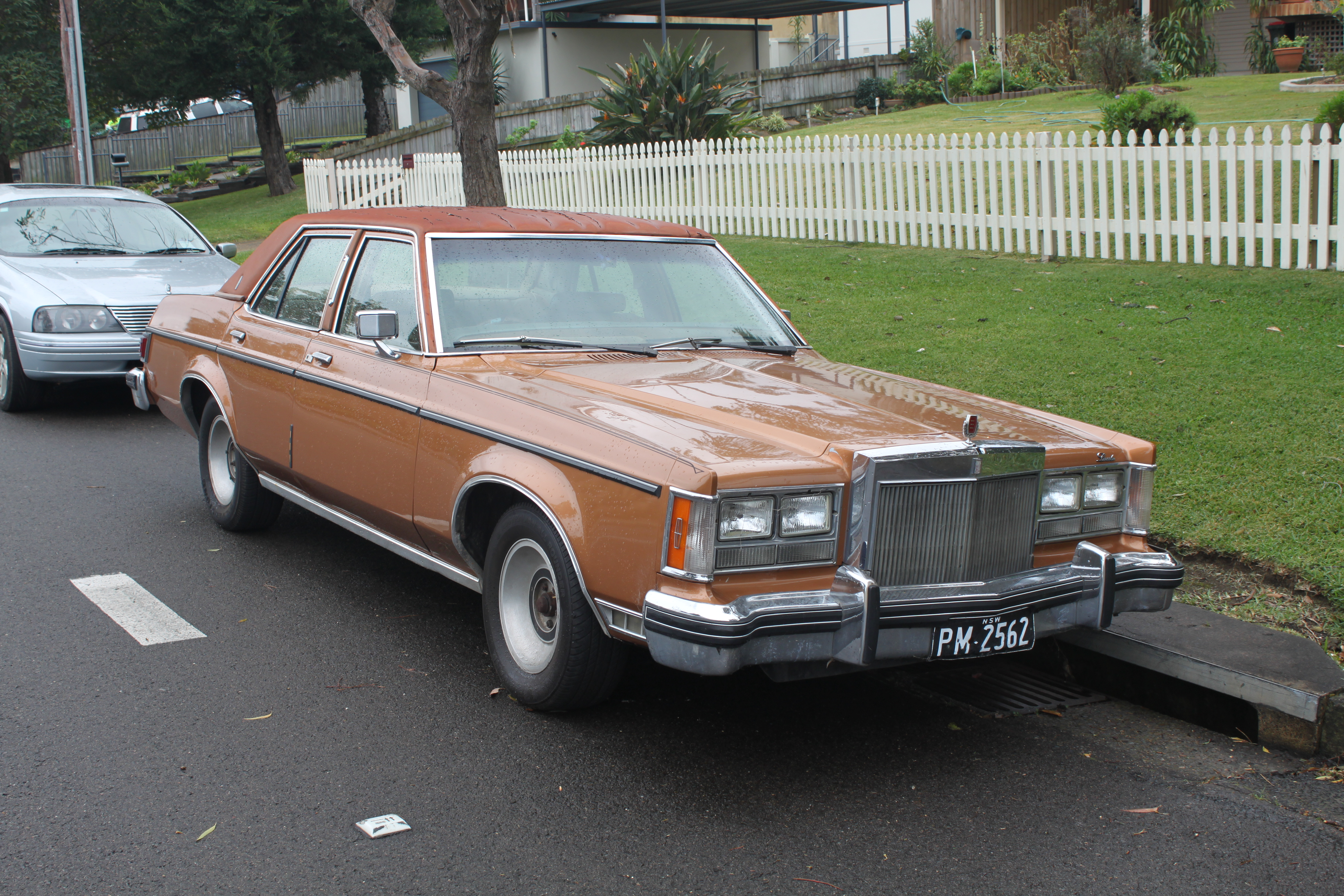
1977 Lincoln Versailles (successor to Grand Monarch Ghia)

For 1977, the Grand Monarch Ghia was withdrawn and repackaged as the Lincoln Versailles. Intended as a response to the Cadillac Seville, the Versailles adopted much of the content of the Grand Monarch Ghia with a slightly restyled exterior. Among the most controversial examples of badge engineering in the American automotive industry, the Lincoln Versailles was withdrawn during the 1980 model year.

== See also ==
- Ford Granada (North America)
- Lincoln Versailles
