= Ford Falcon (XK) =

Australian full-size car

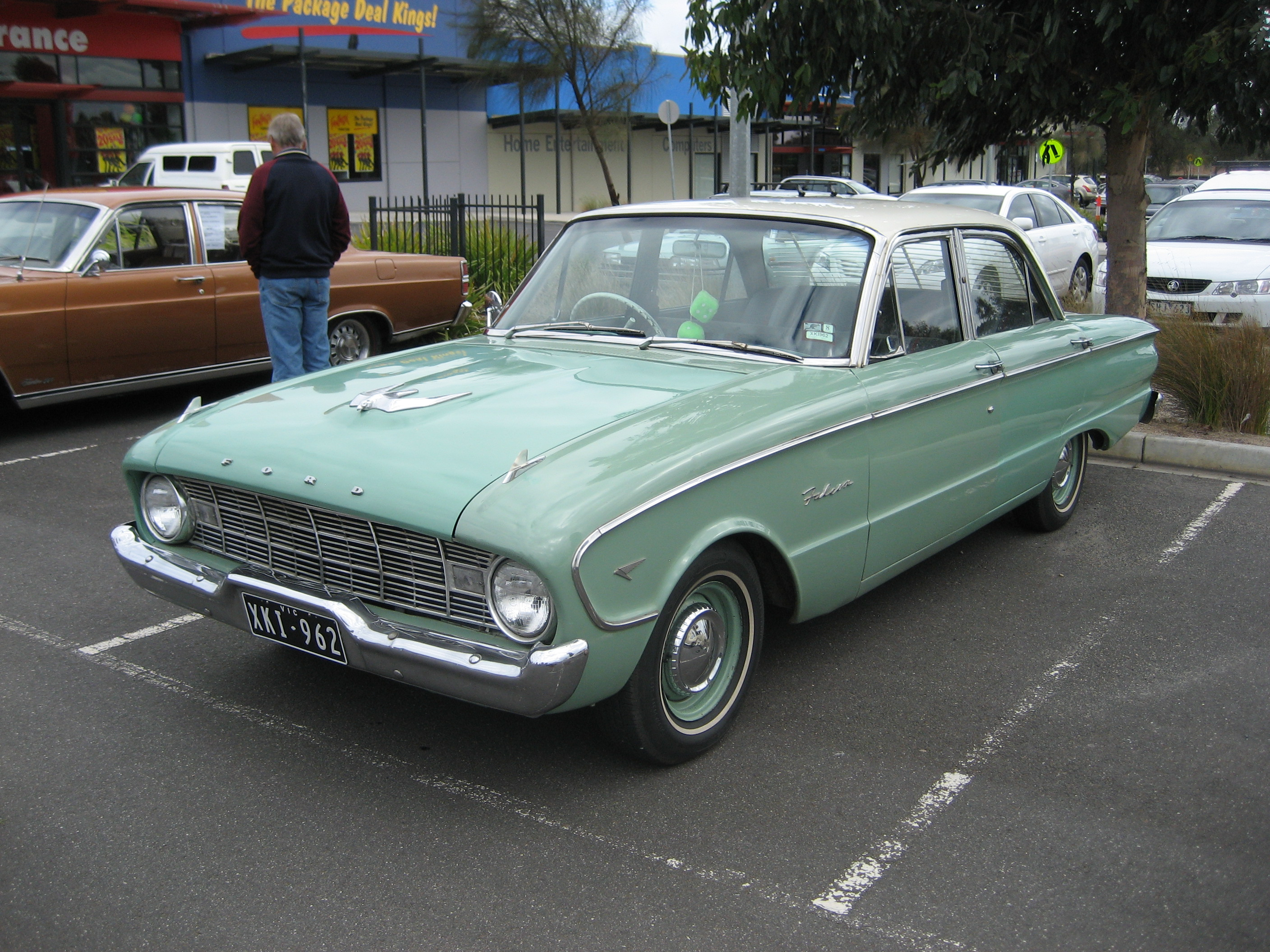
- Ford Falcon Deluxe sedan

Overview
- Manufacturer: Ford Australia
- Production: September 1960 – August 1962

Body and chassis
- Class: Mid-size car
- Body style: 4-door sedan 5-door station wagon 2-door coupé utility 2-door panel van
- Layout: FR layout

Powertrain
- Engine: 2.4 L (144 cu in) Falcon Six I6; 2.8 L (170 cu in) Falcon Six I6
- Transmission: 3-speed manual 2-speed Ford-O-Matic automatic

Dimensions
- Wheelbase: 2,781 mm (109.5 in)
- Length: 4,602 mm (181.2 in)
- Width: 1,778 mm (70.0 in)
- Height: 1,384 mm (54.5 in)
- Kerb weight: 1,103–1,130 kg (2,432–2,491 lb)

Chronology
- Successor: Ford XL Falcon

The Ford Falcon (XK) is a mid-sized car that was produced by Ford Australia between 1960 and 1962. It was the first of four models in the first of seven generations of the Australian Falcon produced until 2016, outlasting its North American namesake by several decades.

== Overview ==
The first Falcon sold in Australia was the XK series, which was introduced in September 1960. It was initially offered only as a four-door sedan, in both Falcon and Falcon Deluxe trim levels; the Deluxe offered two-colour seat and door upholstery in vinyl. The XK was essentially a right-hand drive version of the North American 1960 model, although local rural dealers often included modifications such as heavy-duty rear suspension (five leaves) and larger 6.50 x 13 tyres. Front seat belts were optional.

The steering was light and the ride surprisingly good, on well-paved roads. Whereas the North American model used an 'economy' 3.10:1 rear axle ratio, the Australian Falcon was built with a 3.56:1 ratio which better complemented the torque characteristics of the engine. It had a 38 ft (12 m) turning circle.

The wagon, added to the range in November 1960, was shortened at the rear due to concern that the back of the car might scrape on rough roads and spoon drains.

Billed as being "Australian-with a world of difference", Falcon offered the first serious alternative to Holden, and became an instant success. Sales were aided by the contemporary FB series Holden being perceived as lacklustre and dated by comparison. Two engines were available; a 144 cu in (2,360 cc) Falcon Six inline-six, which produced 67 kW (90 hp; 91 PS) and an optional 170 cu in (2,786 cc) version of the Falcon Six, which produced 75 kW (101 hp; 102 PS). The Falcon was available with either a three-speed column shift manual transmission, or a two-speed Ford-O-Matic automatic transmission.

Although the engines were superior to the Holden FB's 138 cu in (2,261 cc) inline-six, which produced 56 kW (75 hp; 76 PS), and the Holden was only available with a manual transmission, the Falcon quickly gained a reputation for weak gearboxes and suspension components, and struggled to take much of Holden's marketshare. This was further compounded by the introduction of the new Holden EJ in July 1962.

The XK range was expanded in May 1961 with the addition of utility and panel van body styles, officially designated as Falcon Utility and Falcon Sedan Delivery, respectively. As with the wagons, these lacked the extended rear overhang of their American counterparts, and also used the same front doors as the XK wagon and sedan, rather than the longer coupe-style units used by the US sedan delivery and Ranchero, as the US utility was called; this resulted in a much larger B-pillar on the XK utility and van than their US counterparts. The utility and van also lacked a rear bumper bar, having a pair of rubber ‘bumperettes’ wrapping around the rear corners instead.

The Falcon was also exported in small numbers to the various Empire colonies and Commonwealth nations. Pricing for a base model XK Falcon started at £1,137 ($2,274 AUD) When production of the XK Falcon ended in August 1962, 68,465 units had been sold.

The North American counterpart to the XK Falcon was also the basis of the Frontenac marque produced by Ford Canada for a single model year (1960).

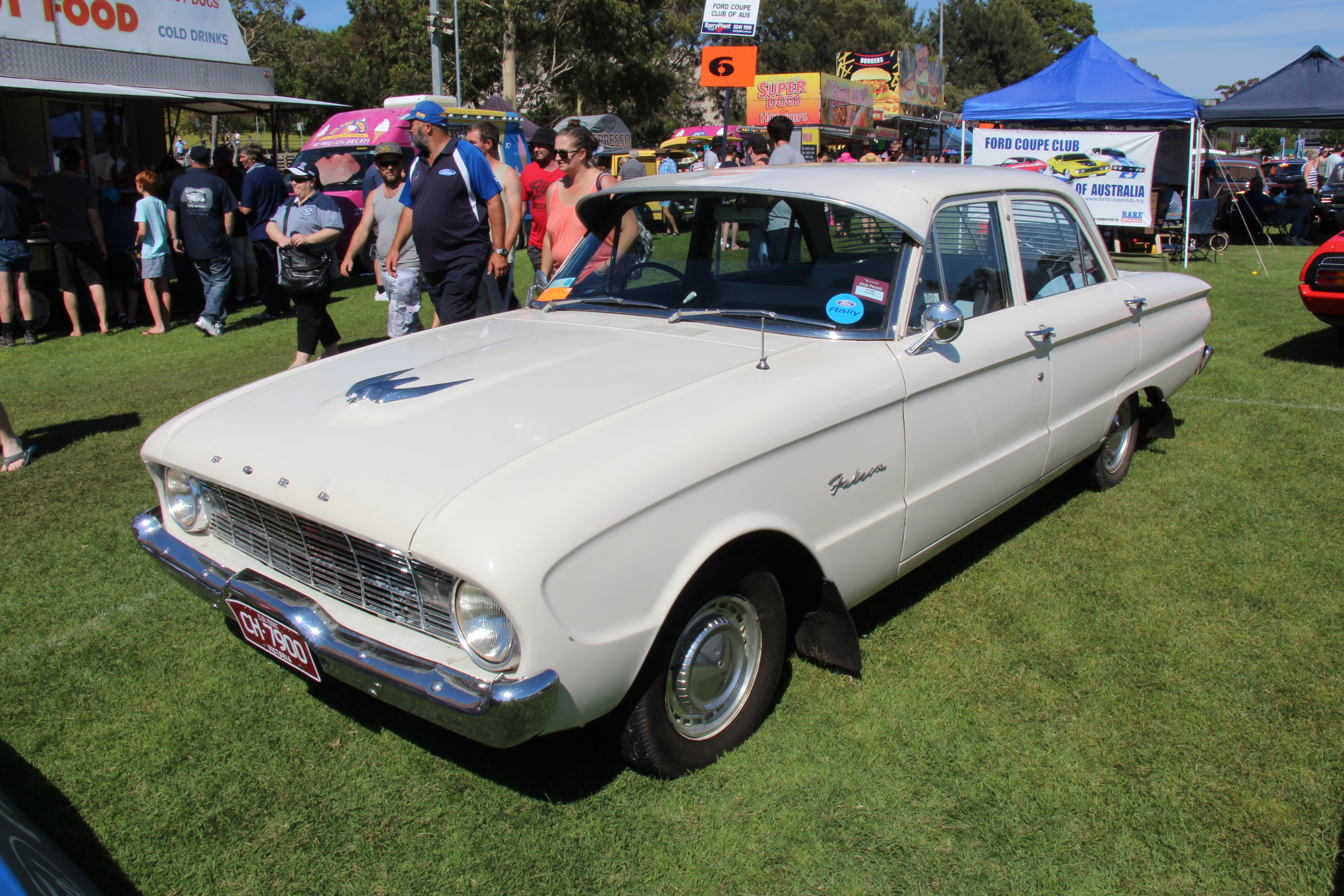
Ford XK Falcon sedan

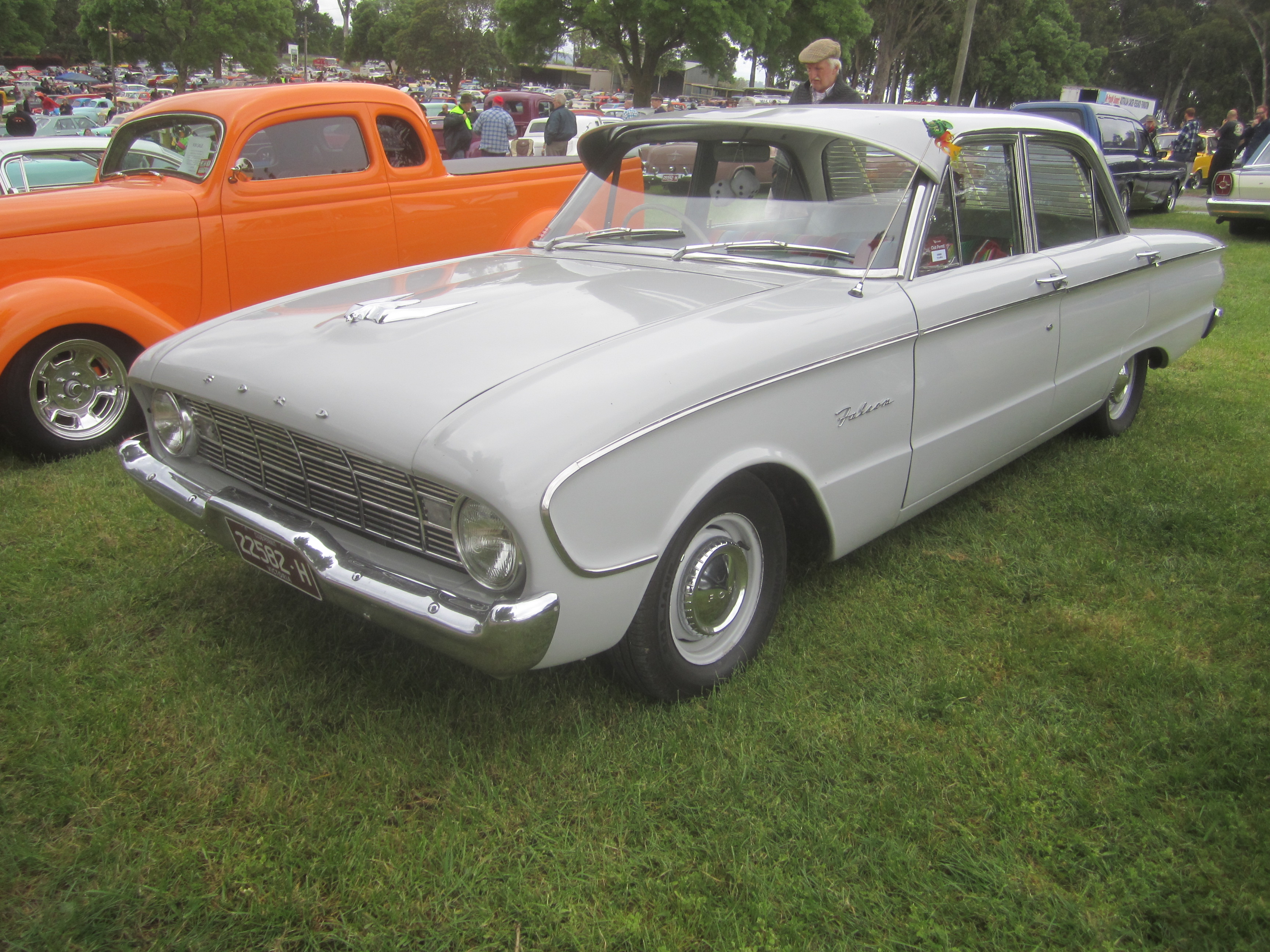
Ford XK Falcon Deluxe sedan

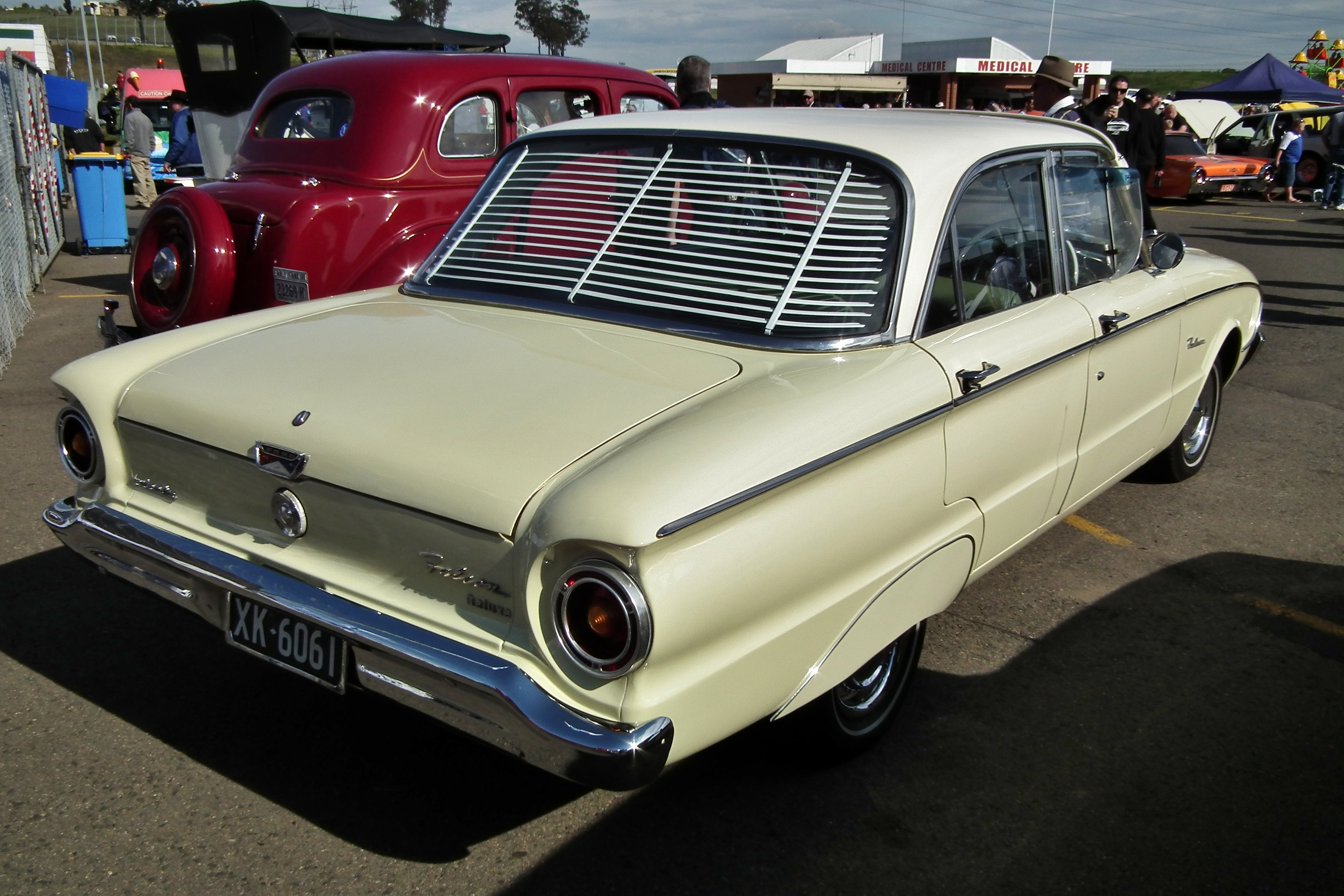
Ford Falcon Deluxe sedan

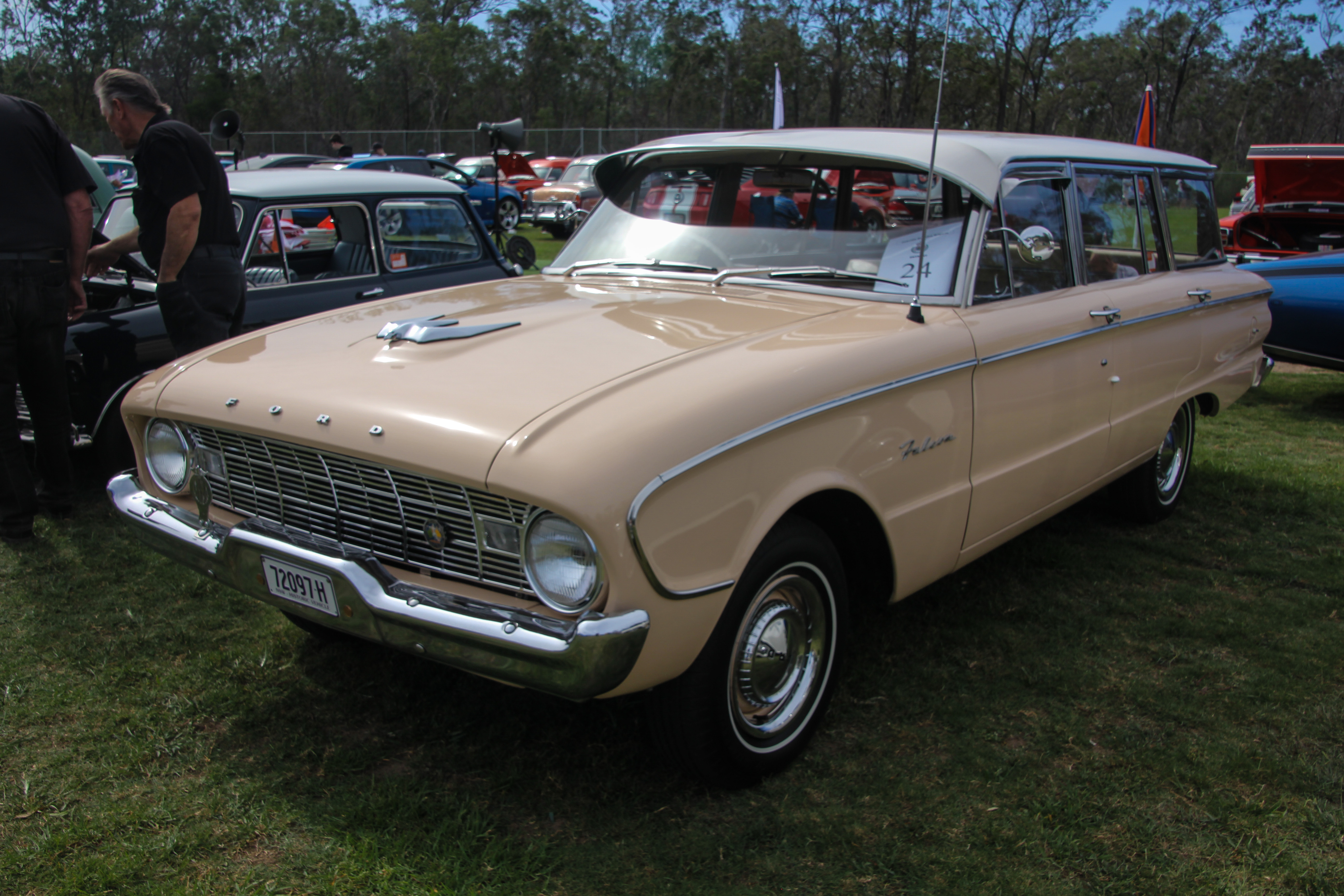
Ford XK Falcon Deluxe station wagon

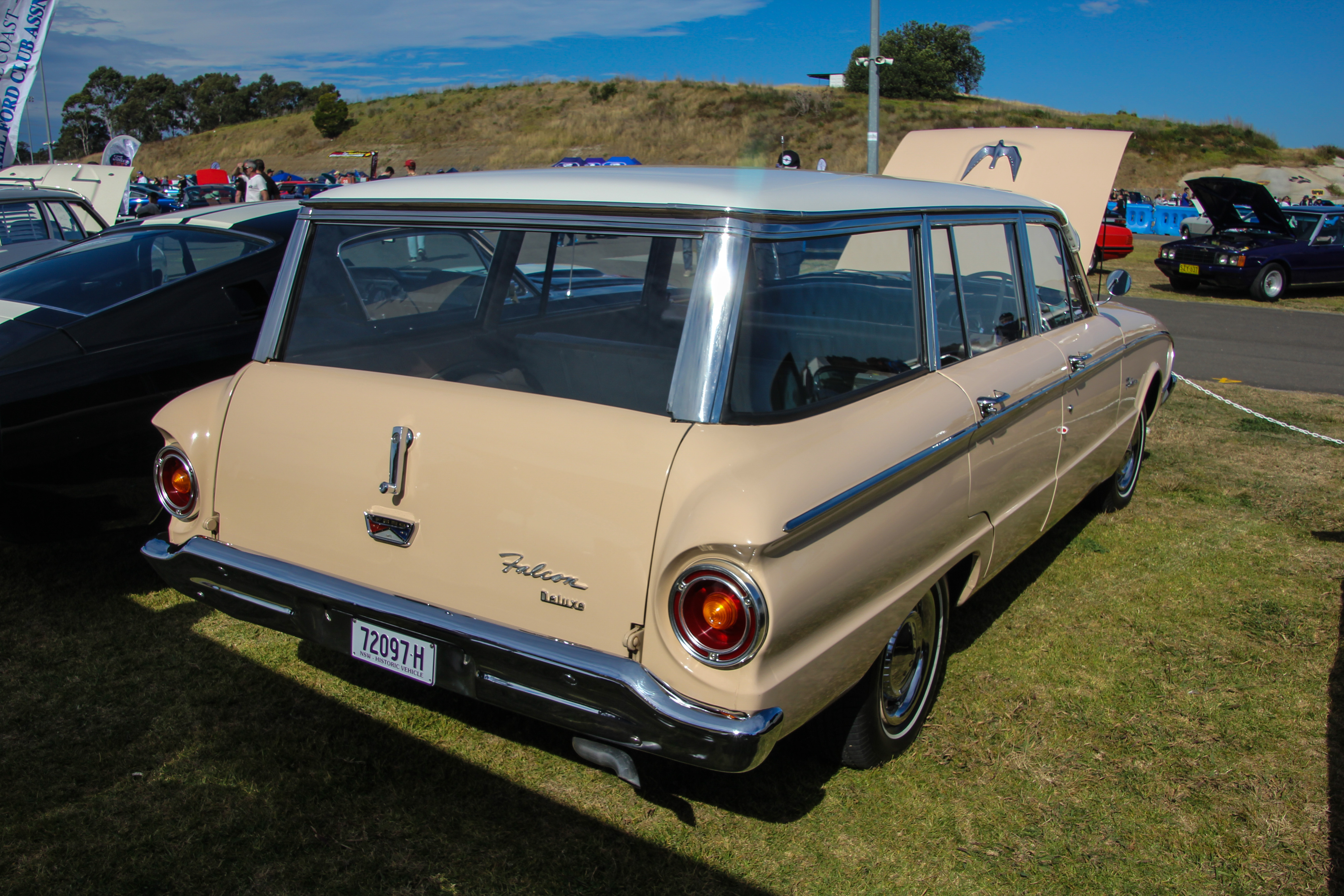
Ford XK Falcon Deluxe station wagon

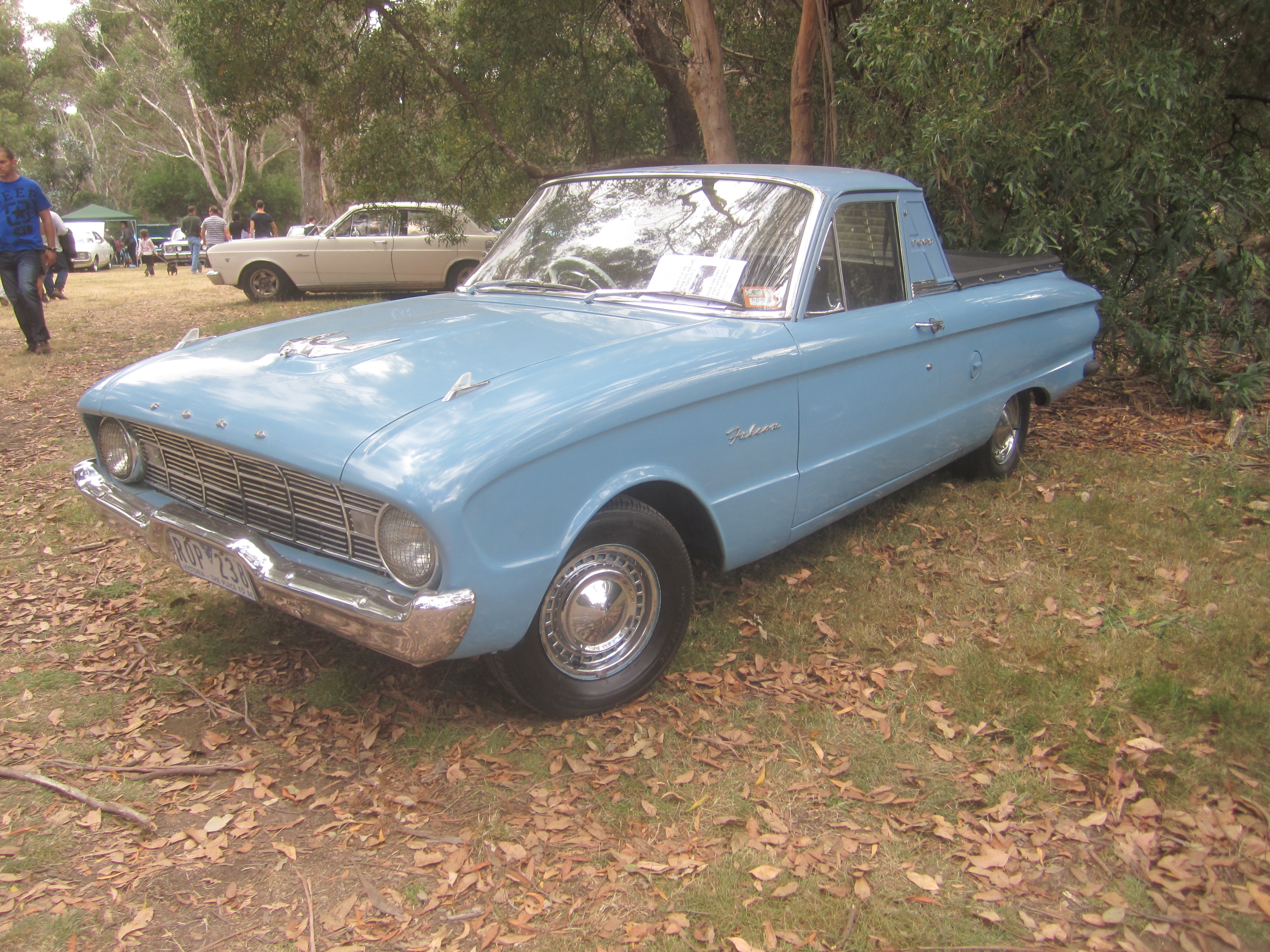
Ford Falcon utility
