= Ford Falcon (North America) =

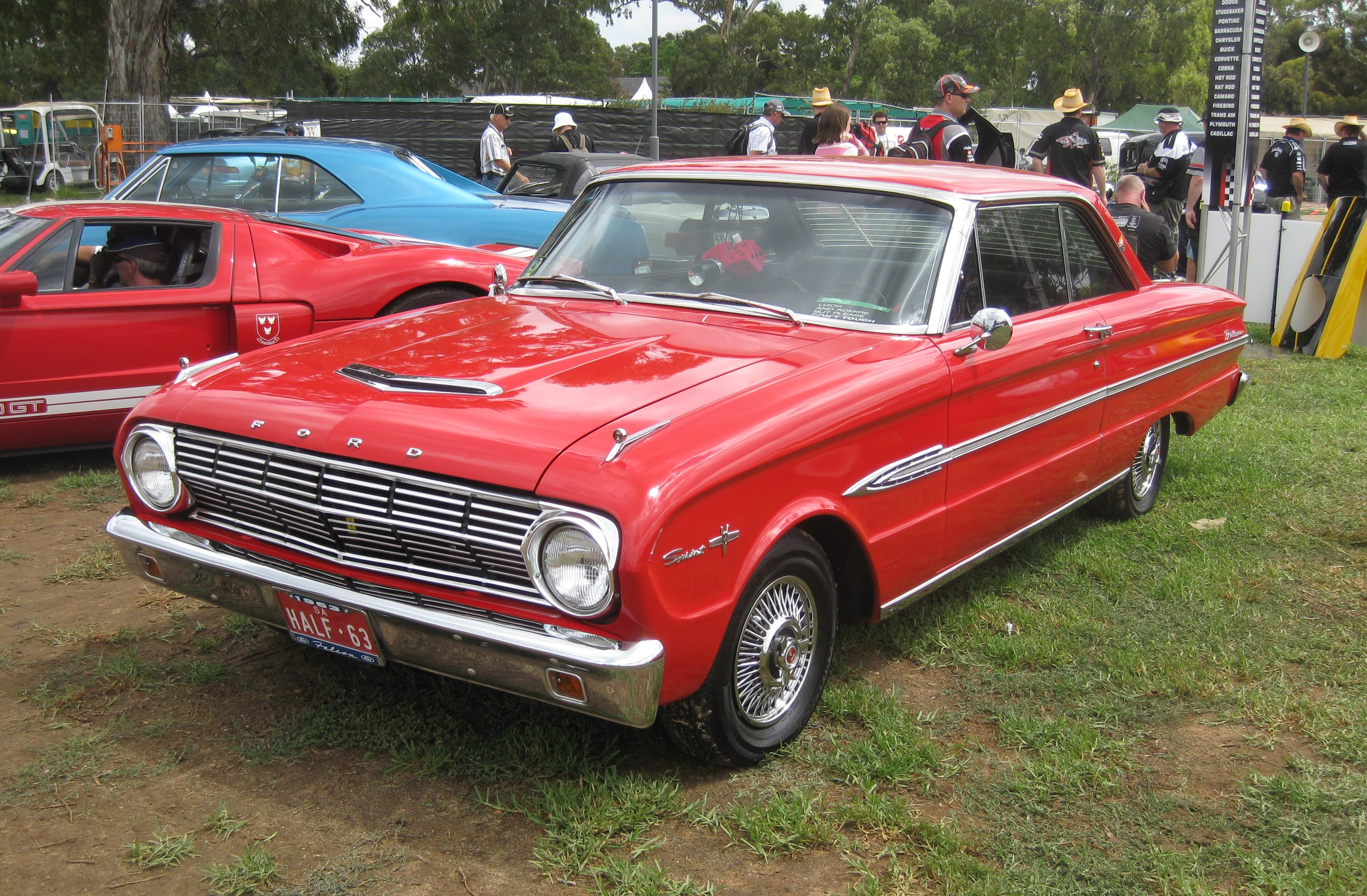
- 1963 Falcon Sprint hardtop

Overview
- Manufacturer: Ford
- Production: 1959–1970

Body and chassis
- Class: Compact
- Layout: FR layout
- Chassis: Unibody
- Related: Mercury Comet; Frontenac

Chronology
- Successor: Ford Maverick

The Ford Falcon is a model line of cars that was produced by Ford from the 1960 to 1970 model years. Though preceded by the Rambler American, the Falcon was the first compact car marketed by the Big Three American manufacturers.

Ford offered the Falcon in a range of body styles, including two-door and four-door sedans, two-door hardtops and convertibles, two-door and four-door station wagons (the former, serving as a basis of the final Ford sedan delivery), and coupe utility pickups (serving as the basis of the Ford Ranchero). Through the 1960s, Ford would produce three distinct generations of the Falcon; a final version of the Falcon serving as the lowest-price version of the Ford Torino.

For nearly two decades, the model architecture used by the Falcon was used by eleven Ford vehicle lines. Alongside the first generations of the Ford Mustang and Mercury Cougar pony cars and the Ford Econoline/Ford Falcon Van/Ford Club Wagon vans, the platform was used for two generations of successors to the Falcon, including the Ford Maverick and Mercury Comet and the later Ford Granada and Mercury Monarch; the Lincoln Versailles luxury sedan was the final model line derived from the Falcon.

During its production, the Falcon was manufactured by Ford in multiple facilities across North America. Following its discontinuation in that region, the platform continued in production through 1991 by Ford Argentina (as the Ford Granada). From 1972, Ford Australia continued development of the Falcon as a model line distinct to the region, lasting through 2016.

== History ==
Edsel Ford first used the term "Falcon" for a more luxurious Ford he designed in 1935. He decided the new car did not fit with Ford's other offerings, so this design eventually became the Mercury.

Historically, the "Big Three" auto manufacturers (GM, Ford, and Chrysler), focused purely on the larger and more profitable vehicles in the US and Canadian markets. Towards the mid-1950s, all three manufacturers realized that this strategy would no longer work. Large automobiles were becoming increasingly expensive, making smaller cars such as Fiats, Renaults, Toyotas, and Volkswagens increasingly attractive. Furthermore, many American families were now in the market for a second car, and market research showed women especially thought the full-size car had grown too large and cumbersome.

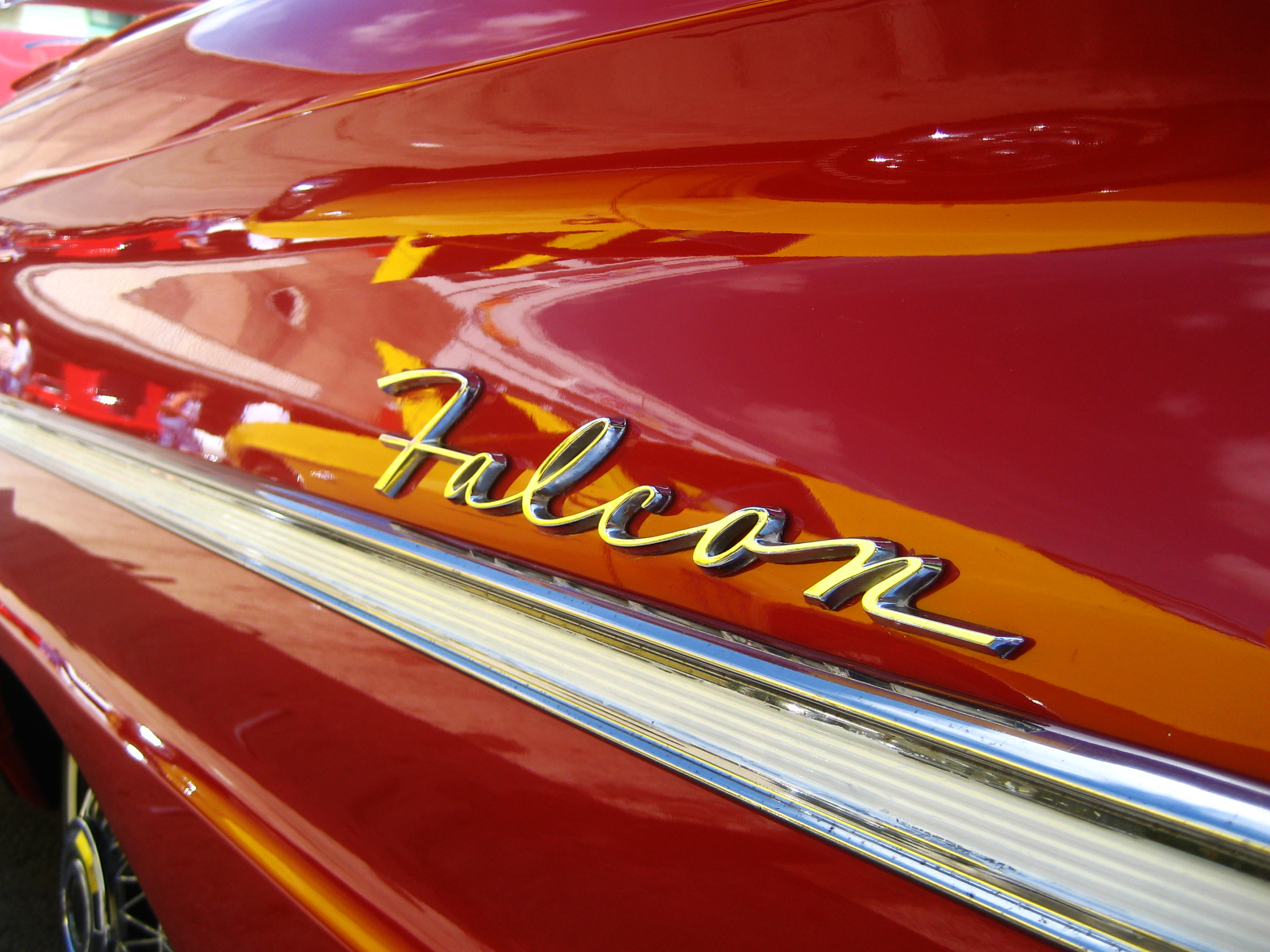
Falcon wordmark emblem on side

At the same time, research showed many buyers would prefer to buy US or Canadian if the domestic manufacturers offered a smaller car with lower cost of ownership. Thus, all three introduced compacts: the Valiant from Chrysler (becoming the Plymouth Valiant in 1960, and joined by a downsized Dodge Dart in 1961), GM's Chevrolet Corvair, and the Ford Falcon. Studebaker also introduced the Lark, and Rambler downsized its near-compact American in 1959. Ford United Kingdom had begun production of the Ford Anglia in 1939, and the earlier Ford Model Y in 1932, followed by the Ford Zephyr, none of which were sold in North America. Ford of Germany built the Ford Eifel, followed by the Ford Köln, which was mechanically similar to the British Model Y, followed later by the Ford Taunus in 1939, but were also not sold in North America. The European Fords, Anglia, Zephyr, and Taunus, were in production at the same time the Falcon was introduced.

The project which became the Falcon was started and sponsored by Ford General Manager Robert S. McNamara, who commissioned a team to create what by American standards of the time would be a small car, but elsewhere in the world considered a mid-size. McNamara, who was promoted to Group Vice President of Cars and Trucks by the time the Falcon was launched, was intimately involved in development, insisting on keeping the costs and weight of the car as low as possible. Engineer Harley Copp employed a unibody atop a standard suspension and sourced parts from Ford's existing bin to keep the price low, while providing room for six passengers in reasonable comfort. The sales success of the conventional Falcon along with slow sales of GM's rear-engined Corvair led General Motors to introduce their own compact car based on the Falcon's principles, the Chevy II.

== First generation (1960–1963) ==
First generation
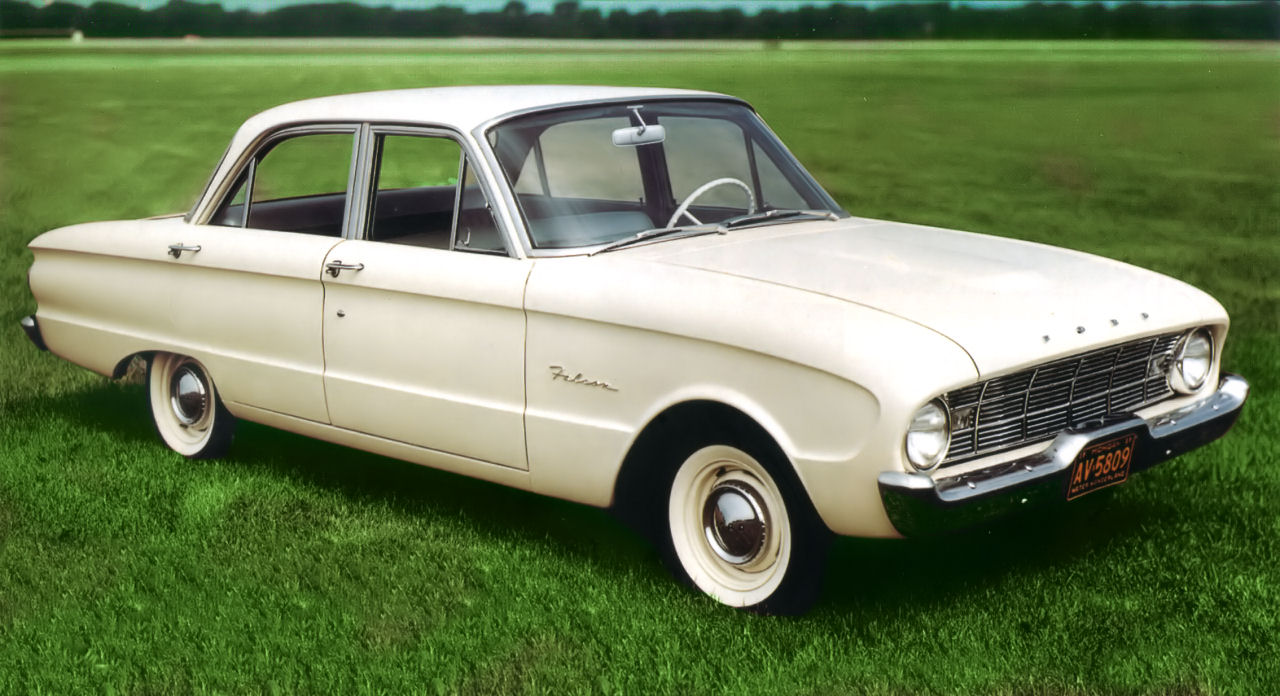
- 1960 Ford Falcon sedan

Overview
- Production: 1959–1963
- Assembly: Claycomo, Missouri (⧉); Milpitas, California (⧉); Edison, New Jersey (⧉); Oakville, Ontario, Canada (⧉); Cuautitlán, Mexico (⧉); Broadmeadows, Australia (⧉); Buenos Aires, Argentina (⧉); Arica, Chile (Chilemotores S.A.)

Body and chassis
- Body style: 2-door sedan 4-door sedan 3-door station wagon 5-door station wagon 2-door hardtop 2-door convertible 2-door coupe utility 2-door sedan delivery
- Chassis: Unibody
- Related: Ford Ranchero; Mercury Comet; Frontenac; Ford Falcon Van; Ford XK Falcon (Australia); Ford XL Falcon (Australia)

Powertrain
- Engine: 144 cu in (2.4 L) Mileage Maker inline six-cylinder (I6); 170 cu in (2.8 L) Mileage Maker I6; 260 cu in (4.3 L) Challenger V8 (after 1962)
- Transmission: 2-speed automatic 3-speed manual 4-speed manual

Dimensions
- Wheelbase: 109.5 in (2,781 mm)
- Length: 181 in (4,597 mm)
- Width: 70.1 in (1,781 mm)
- Height: 54.4 in (1,382 mm)

The 1960 Falcon was powered by a small, lightweight 95 hp (71 kW), 144 CID (2.4 L) Mileage Maker straight-six with a single-barrel carburetor. Unibody construction, which had previously been introduced by Ford on the luxurious 1958 Ford Thunderbird and Lincoln Continental, accommodated coil spring front suspension, leaf spring rear suspension, and drum brakes front and rear. A three-speed manual column shift was standard, and the two-speed Ford-O-Matic automatic was optional. It had room for six passengers. Body styles included two- and four-door sedans, two- or four-door station wagons, and the Ranchero car-based pickup, transferred onto the Falcon platform for 1960 from the Fairlane. The Comet, originally intended for the defunct Edsel marque and based on the 1960 Falcon, was launched in the US in March 1960. (By 1962, the Comet adopted more Mercury-based styling and was folded into the Mercury line as the Mercury Comet.)

The market shift that spurred the development of the Falcon and its competitors also precipitated the demise of several well-established marques in the late-1950s and early-1960s. Besides the infamous tale of the Edsel, DeSoto, and Packard nameplates all disappeared from the marketplace, while the Nash and Hudson companies were merged to become American Motors Corporation and Studebaker survived until 1967.

In 1960, Ford's Canadian subsidiary introduced the Falcon-based Frontenac. It was designed to give Mercury-Meteor dealers a smaller model to sell, since the Comet was originally intended as an Edsel, which was sold by Ford-Monarch dealers. Produced for the 1960 model year only, the Frontenac was essentially a rebadged 1960 Falcon with its own unique grille, tail lights, and external trim, including red maple-leaf insignia. Despite strong sales (5% of Ford's total Canadian output), the Frontenac was discontinued and replaced by the Comet for 1961.

Robert McNamara, a Ford executive who became Ford's president briefly before being offered the job of U.S. Defense Secretary, is regarded by many as "the father of the Falcon". McNamara left Ford shortly after the Falcon's introduction, but his faith in the concept was vindicated with record sales; over half a million sold in the first year and over a million sold by the end of the second year.

The 1961 model year introduced an optional 101 hp (75 kW), 170-CID (2.8-L) six, and two new models were introduced; a bucket-seat and console sedan model in a higher trim level called the Futura, and a sedan delivery.

The Ford Falcon brochure featured Charlie Brown and Lucy Van Pelt from the Peanuts comic strip, who remained until 1965. The television marketing of the model line featured the first animated appearances of the characters from Charles Schulz's acclaimed comic strip, Peanuts, with announcer contribution from Paul Frees. Ford boasted of the good fuel economy achieved by the six-cylinder Ford Falcon models in advertising. The fuel economy was good, a claimed 30 mpg_{‑US} (7.8 L/100 km; 36 mpg_{‑imp}), compared to other American cars at the time.

For 1962, the model received a moderate facelift, with a new grille, front bumper, and tail lights, which gave it a slightly more angular look. The hood also gained a chrome trim piece, implying a scoop. The 1962 model year had a Squire model of the four-door station wagon with faux wood trim on the sides. The bucket-seat "Futura" model was offered with a slightly upgraded interior, factory-installed safety belts, different side trim (spears), and different emblems. Halfway through the model year, Ford changed the roof line at the back window to more of a Thunderbird design and offered a four-speed transmission for the first time. The two-door Futura sedan (also referred to as an illusion hardtop' because of the chrome trim around the side window opening) sported a flat rear window in place of the panoramic (wrap-around) window on earlier models to bring its design in line with other Ford cars of the era. In 1962, Ford introduced the Ford Falcon Club Wagon and Deluxe Club Wagon, an eight-passenger, Ford Econoline cab over engine van. Ford also promoted that in a Mobilgas economy run, the Falcon got 32.5 mpg_{‑US} (7.2 L/100 km; 39.0 mpg_{‑imp}).

In 1963, even more models were available. Now a four-door Futura and a Deluxe wagon were available. Futura Convertible and Futura Sports Convertible models were also included in the 1963 range. Later, hardtops, and the new "Sprint" model were introduced. Halfway through the model year (February 1963), the Fairlane's 164 hp (122 kW) "Challenger" 260-CID (4.3-L) V8 engine was offered for the first time.

The only time a V8 option was available in a first-generation Falcon was the 1963½ model, and these cars were produced in very limited numbers (Sprint two-door hardtop (bucket seats) 10,479 produced and Sprint convertible (bucket seats) 4,602 produced). These first-generation Falcon Sprint cars were the basis for the 1964½ Mustangs released by Ford one year later. Many (if not most) of the interior, chassis, suspension, and drivetrain components were derived from those used on the 1963½ Ford Falcon Sprint and/or Fairlane models. In simplest terms, the 1963½ Falcon Sprint is nearly mechanically identical to the 1964½ Mustang, while being aesthetically different.

=== Gallery ===
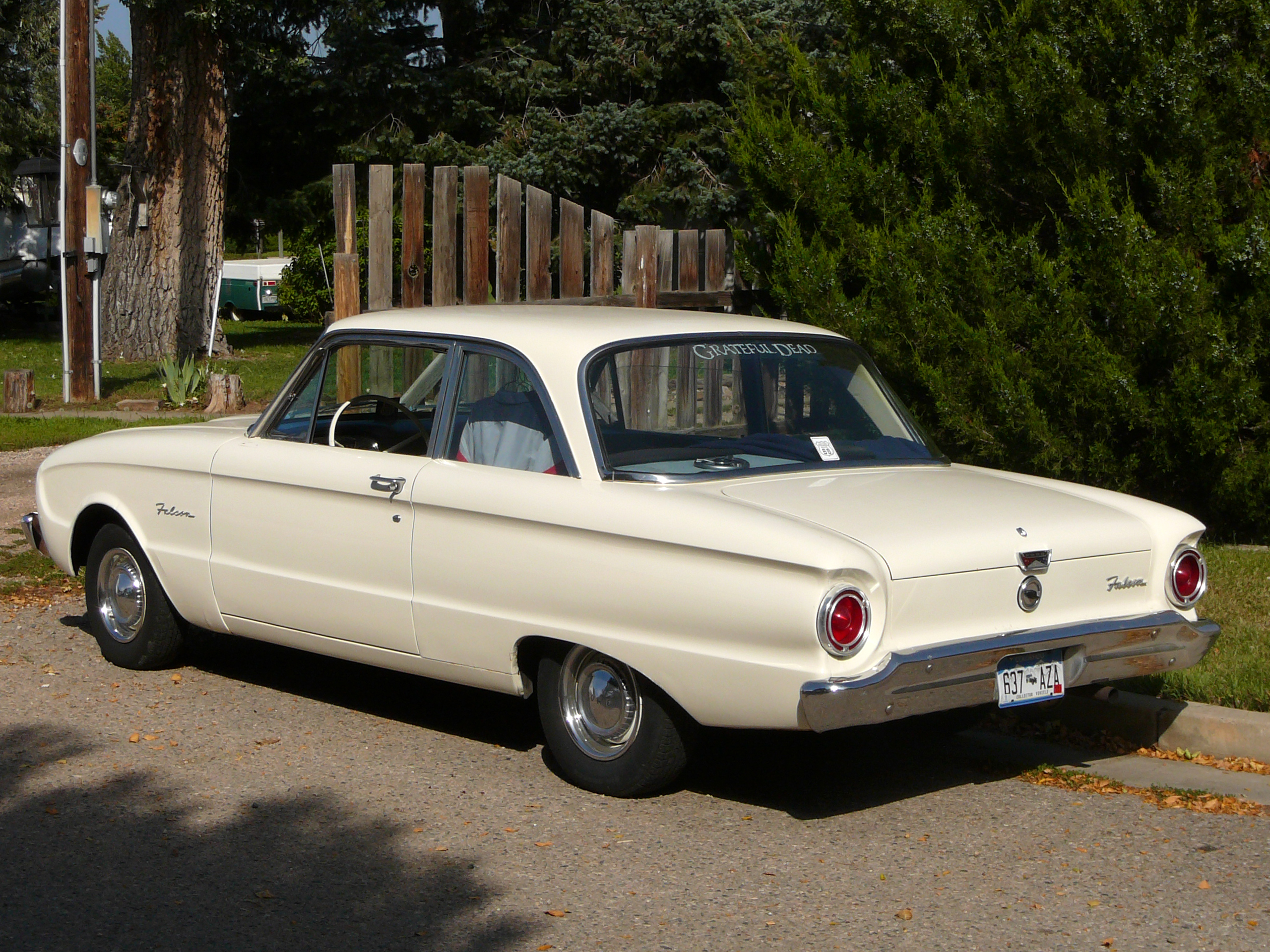
1960 Falcon 2-door sedan

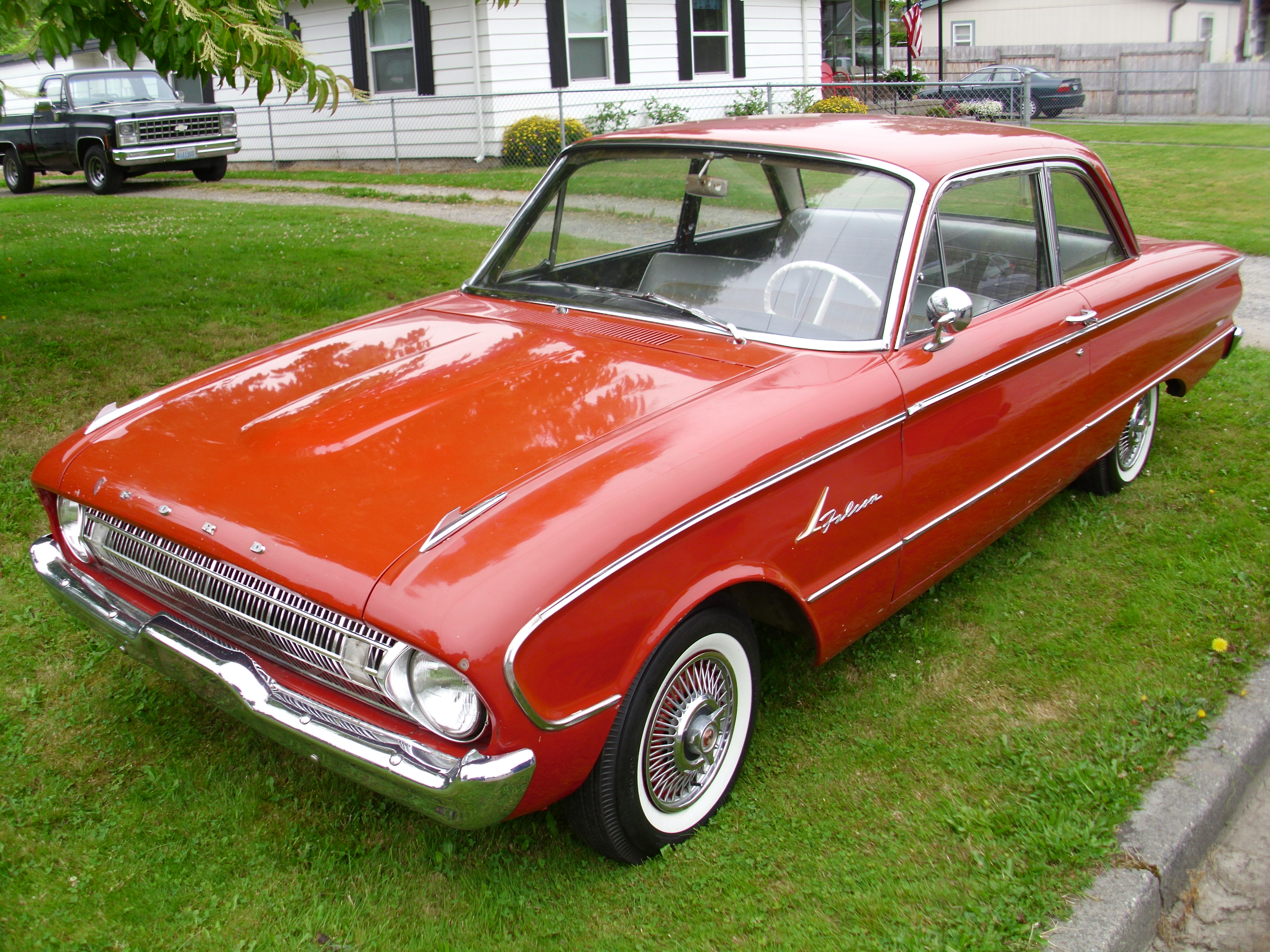
1961 Ford Falcon 2-door sedan

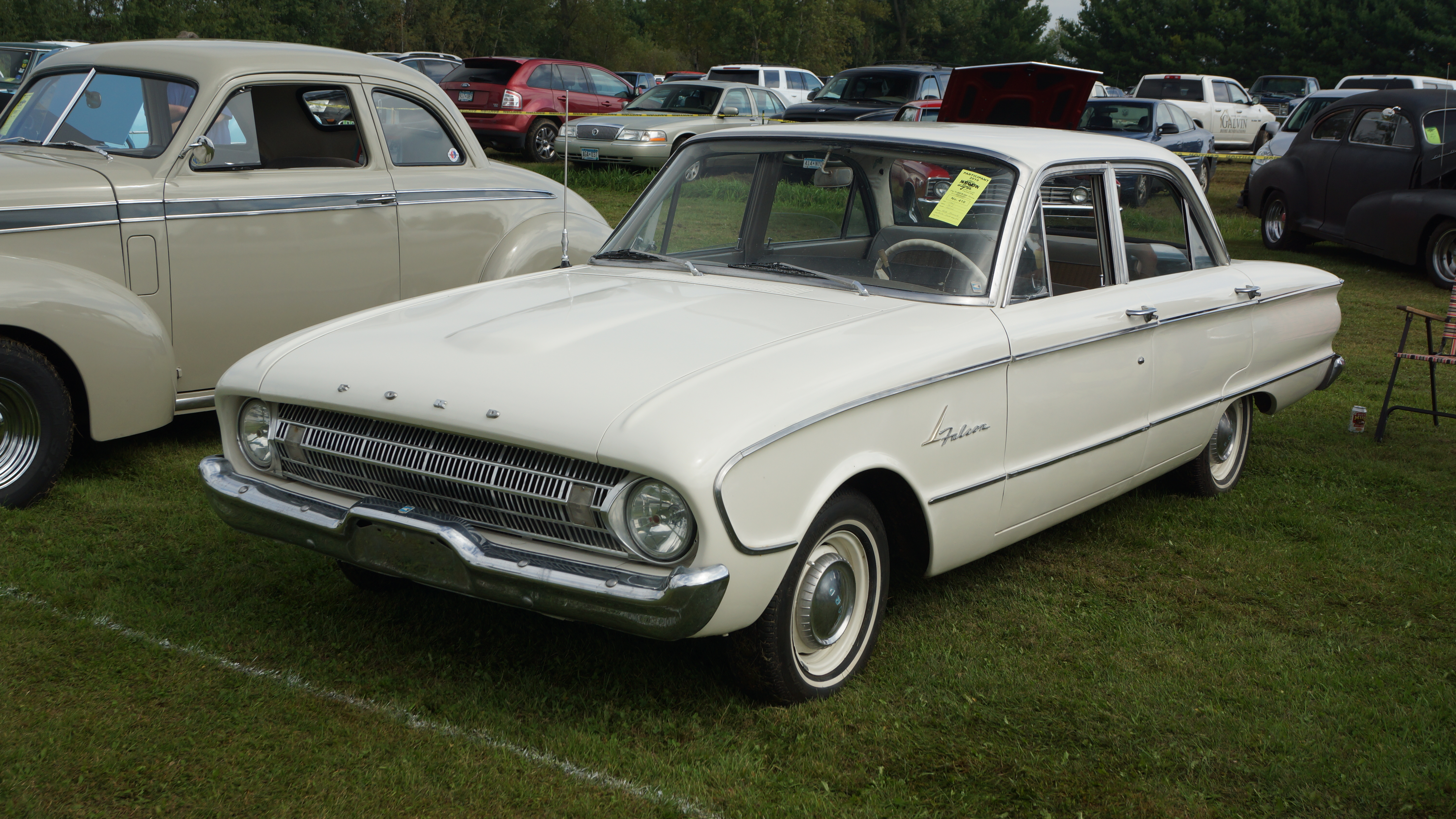
1961 Ford Falcon 4-door Sedan

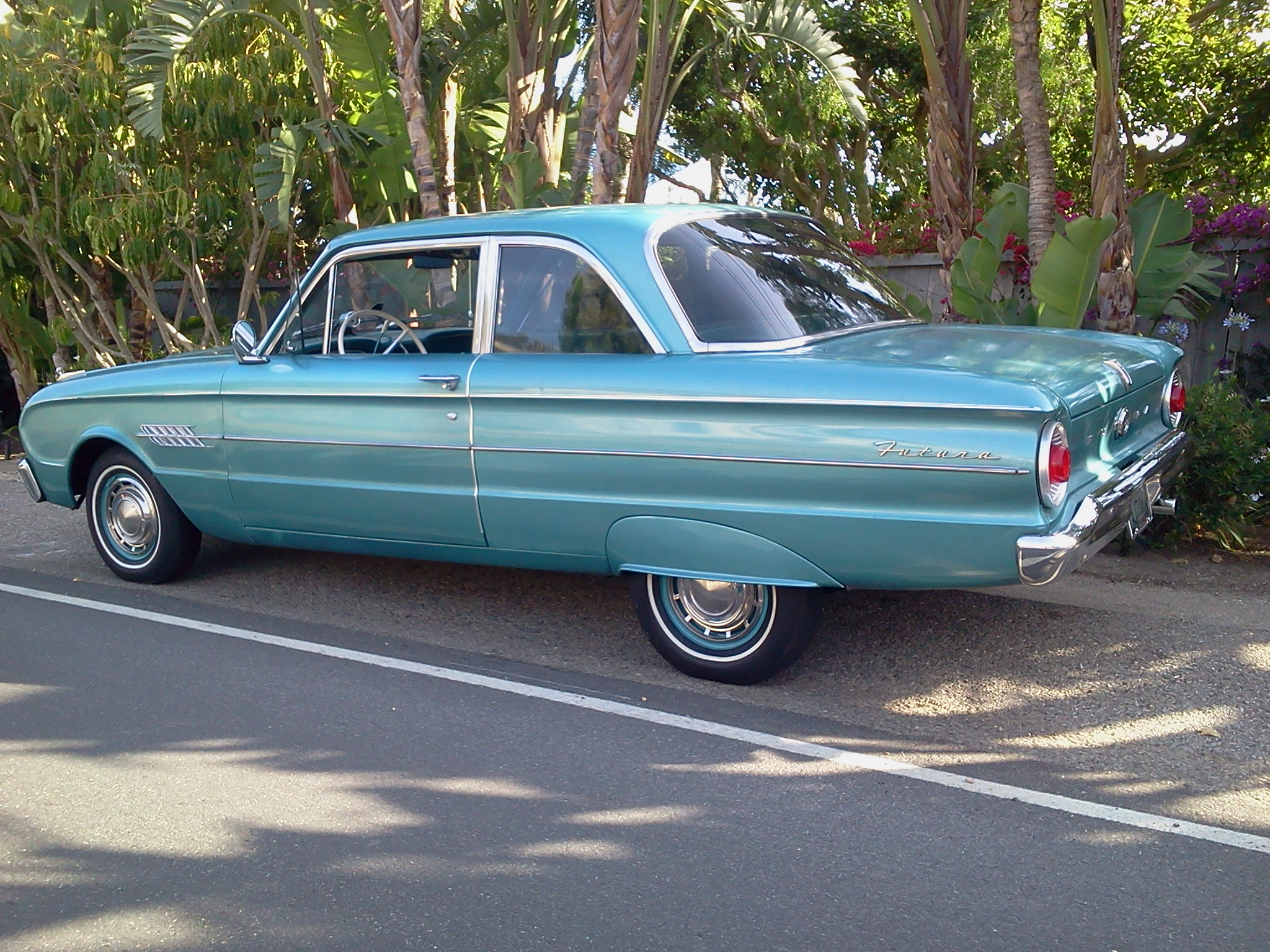
1962 Falcon Futura 2-door sedan

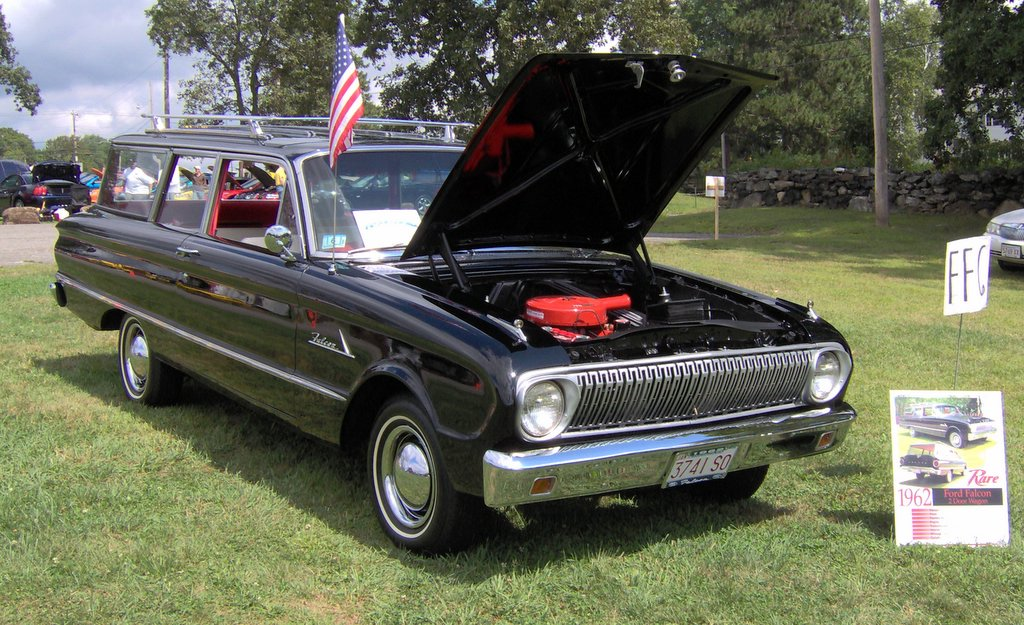
1962 Falcon 2-door wagon

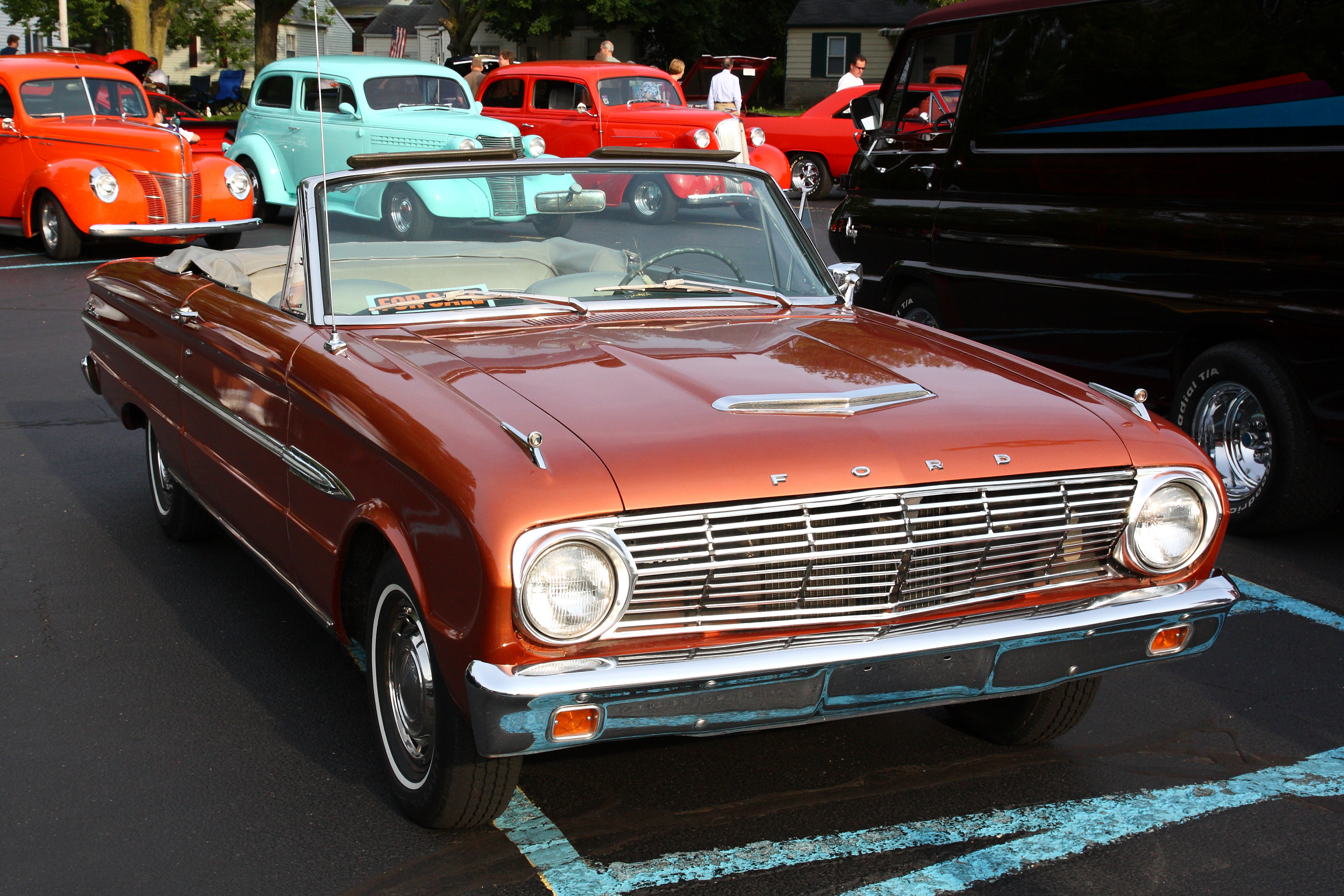
1963 Falcon Futura Sports Convertible

== Second generation (1964–1965) ==
Second generation
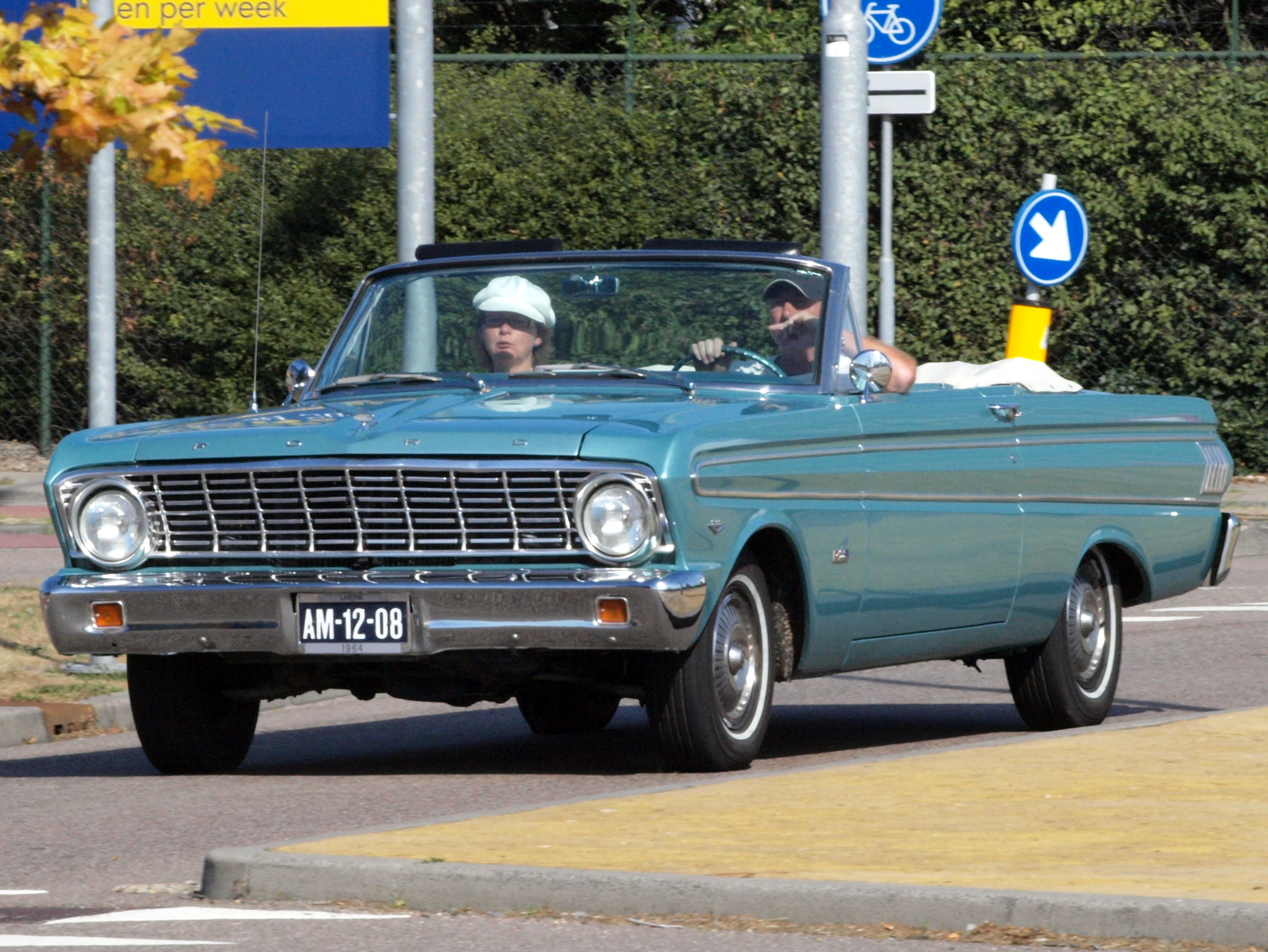
- 1964 Ford Falcon convertible

Overview
- Production: 1963–1965
- Assembly: Lorain, Ohio (⧉); Cuautitlán, Mexico (⧉)

Body and chassis
- Body style: 2-door coupe 4-door sedan 3-door station wagon 5-door station wagon 2-door hardtop 2-door convertible 2-door coupe utility 2-door sedan delivery
- Chassis: Unibody
- Related: Ford Econoline; Ford Falcon Ranchero; Mercury Comet; Ford Mustang

Powertrain
- Engine: 144 cu in (2.4 L) Thriftpower I6; 170 cu in (2.8 L) Thriftpower I6; 200 cu in (3.3 L) Thriftpower I6; 260 cu in (4.3 L) Windsor V8; 289 cu in (4.7 L) Windsor V8
- Transmission: 3-speed automatic 3-speed manual 4-speed manual 2-speed automatic (Ford-o-matic)

Dimensions
- Wheelbase: 109.5 in (2,781 mm)
- Length: 181.6 in (4,613 mm)
- Width: 71.6 in (1,819 mm)

The second generation 1964 Falcon, launched in 1963, featured revised, more squared-off styling. Later in the 1964 model year, Ford's new offering for that market was launched: the Ford Mustang, based heavily on the Falcon's unified frame design. TV commercials now used the character Hazel as well as the Peanuts cartoon characters. The Ford Motor Company was a sponsor of the show, and also sponsored The Ford Show during the late 1950s. For the 1964 year, Ford added a Sprint Package, which gave the Falcon the Fairlane's 260 V8, a stiffer suspension, and a louder exhaust. Because the Mustang had the same options that the Sprint had for only a small amount more, the Sprint never caught on. Even with the addition of the 289 V8 in late 1964, the Sprint was overshadowed by the Mustang, and was discontinued after 1965. The Mustang dealt Falcon sales in North America a blow from which they would never recover. Front suspension was coil springs pivot-mounted on upper arms plus double-acting absorbers. Six-cylinder cars had four-lug hubs with 13-in steel wheels. V-8 cars got five-lug wheels. For 1965, changes were minimal, including a simpler grille and revised side trim on deluxe models. Production ended on June 26, 1965, for convertible Falcons. A padded instrument panel, power steering, power brakes, a radio, a remote-control trunk release, and a parking brake warning light were optional.

From 1965, the three-speed Cruise-O-Matic automatic transmission was available. Front seat belts were standard.

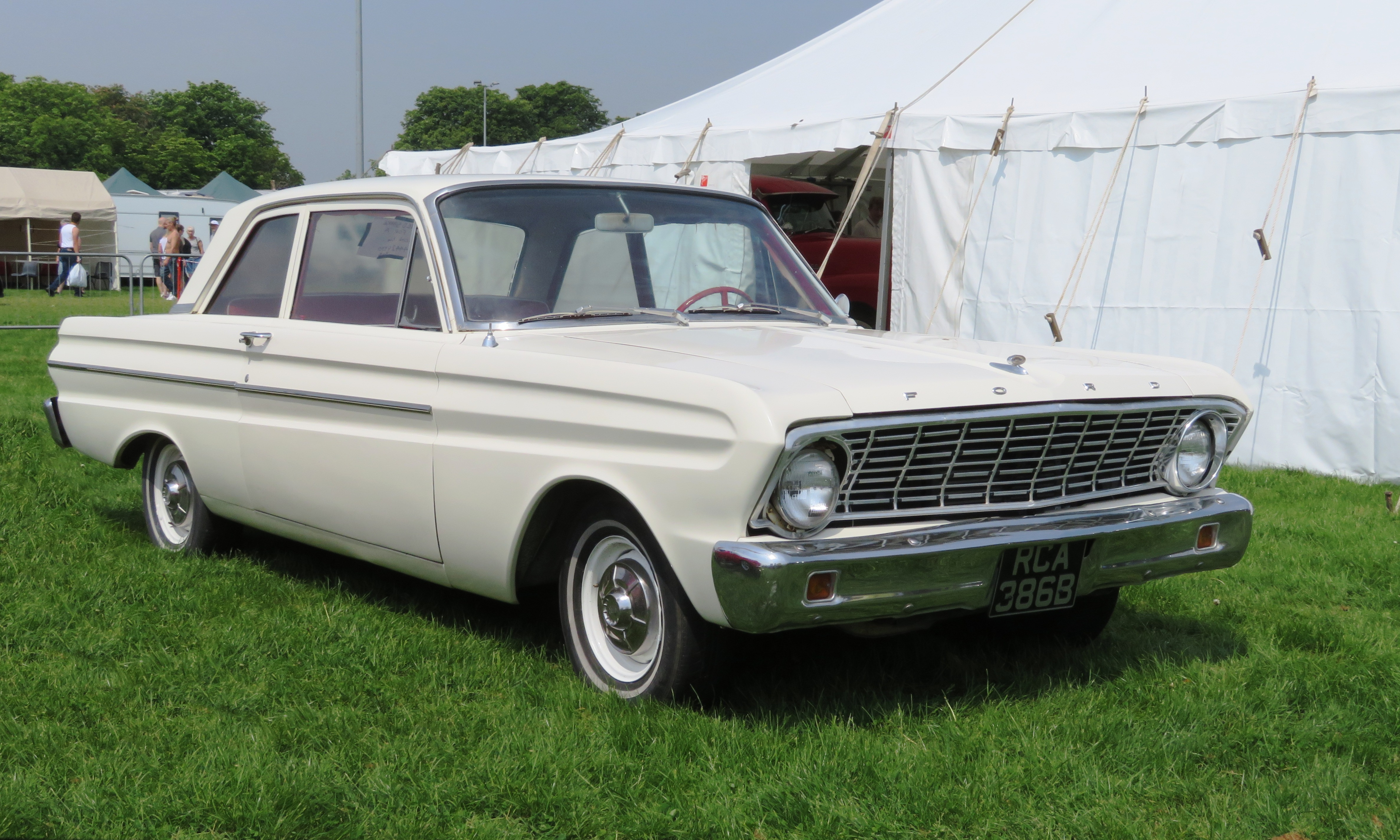
1964 Ford Falcon 2-Door Sedan

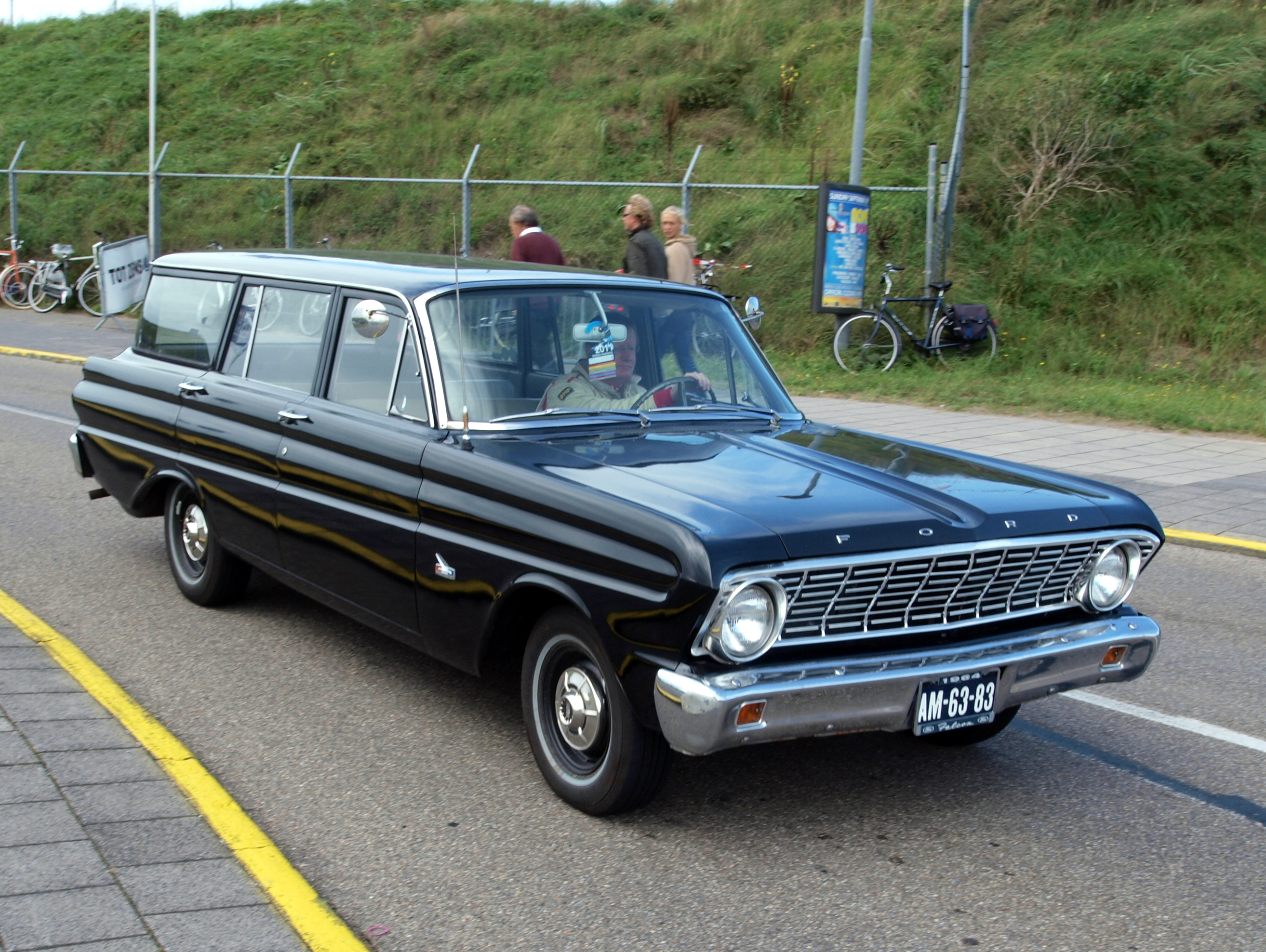
1964 Ford Falcon station wagon

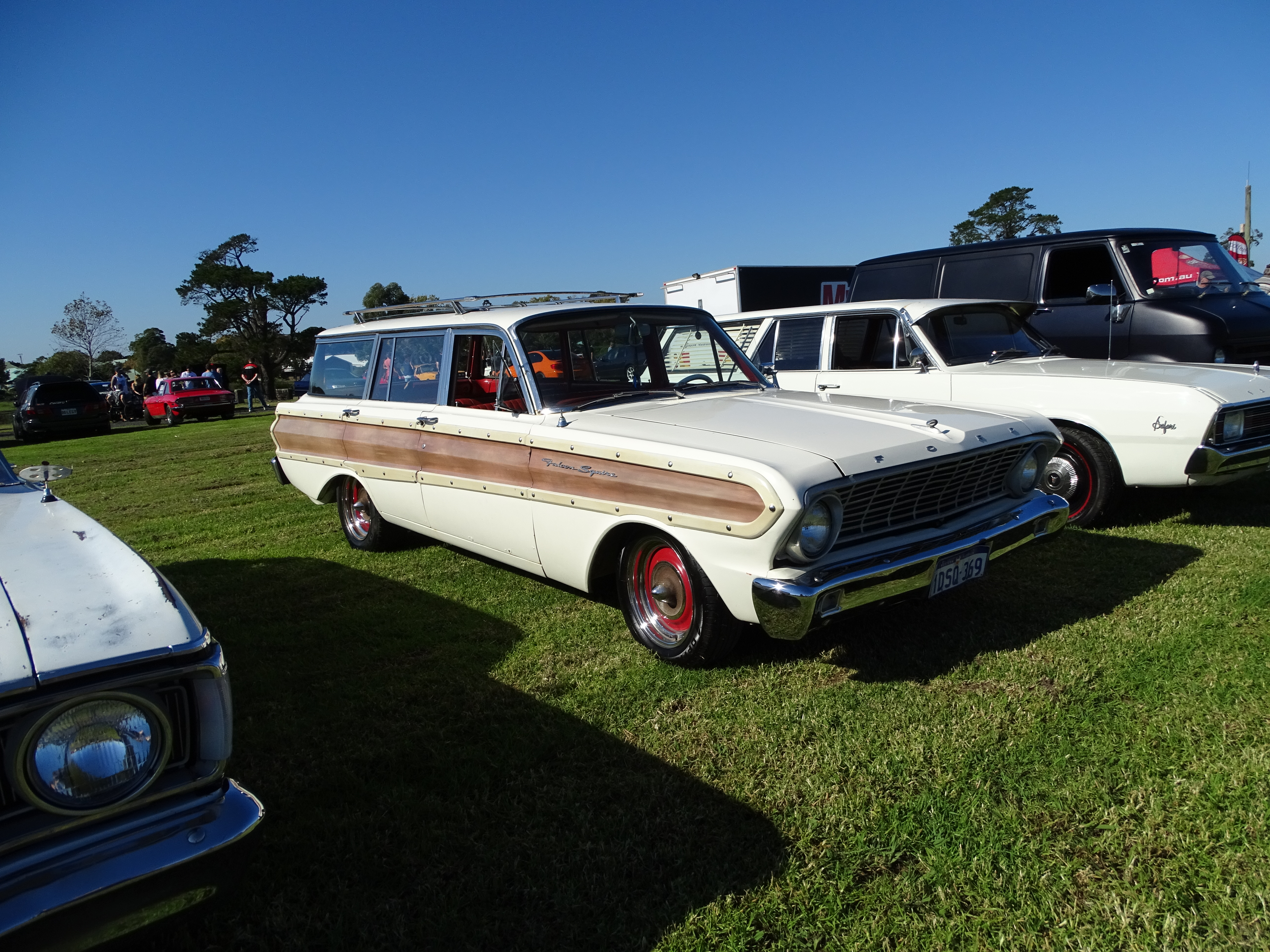
1964 Ford Falcon Squire station wagon

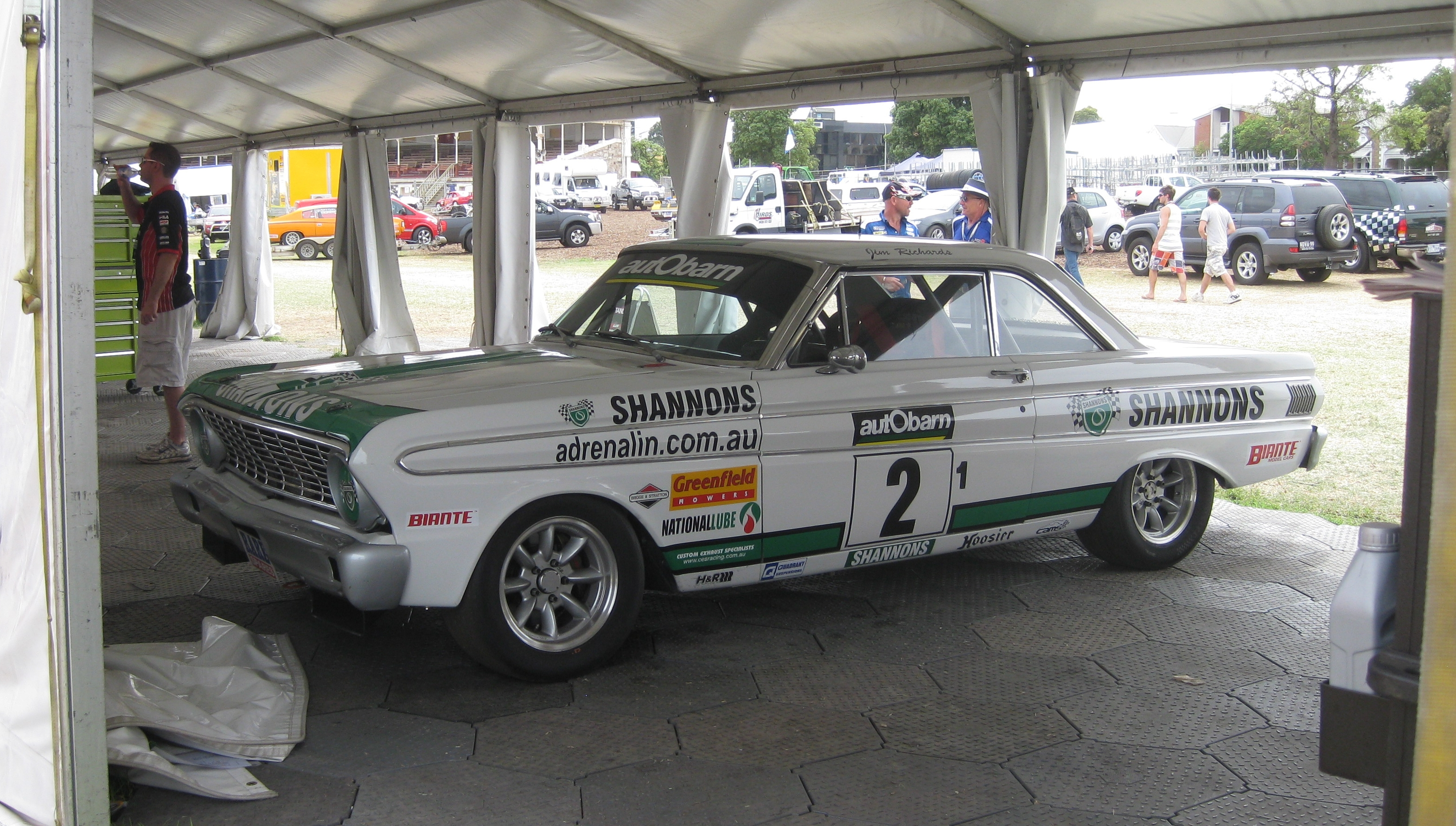
1964 Ford Falcon Sprint Hardtop

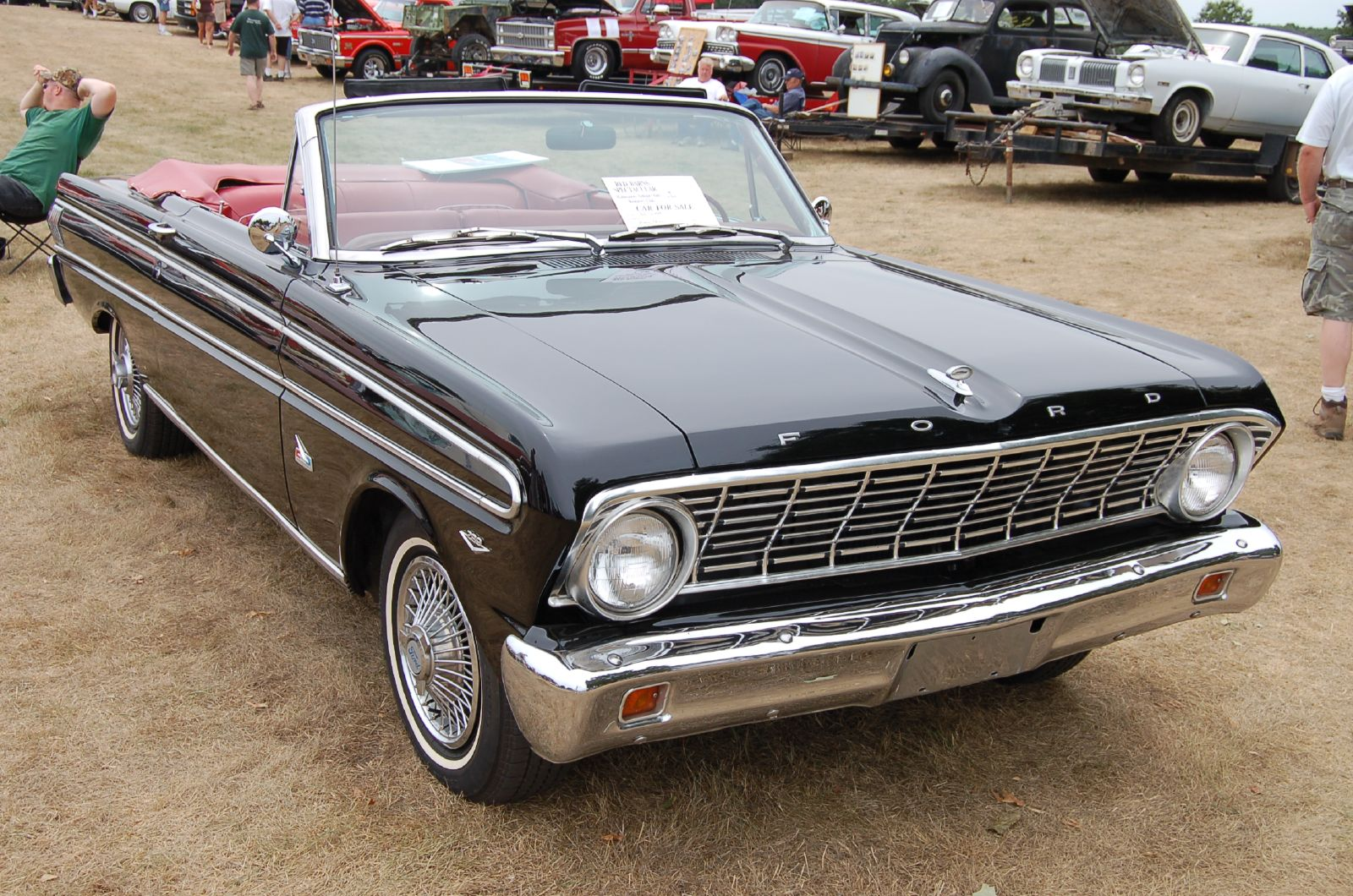
1964 Ford Falcon Futura convertible

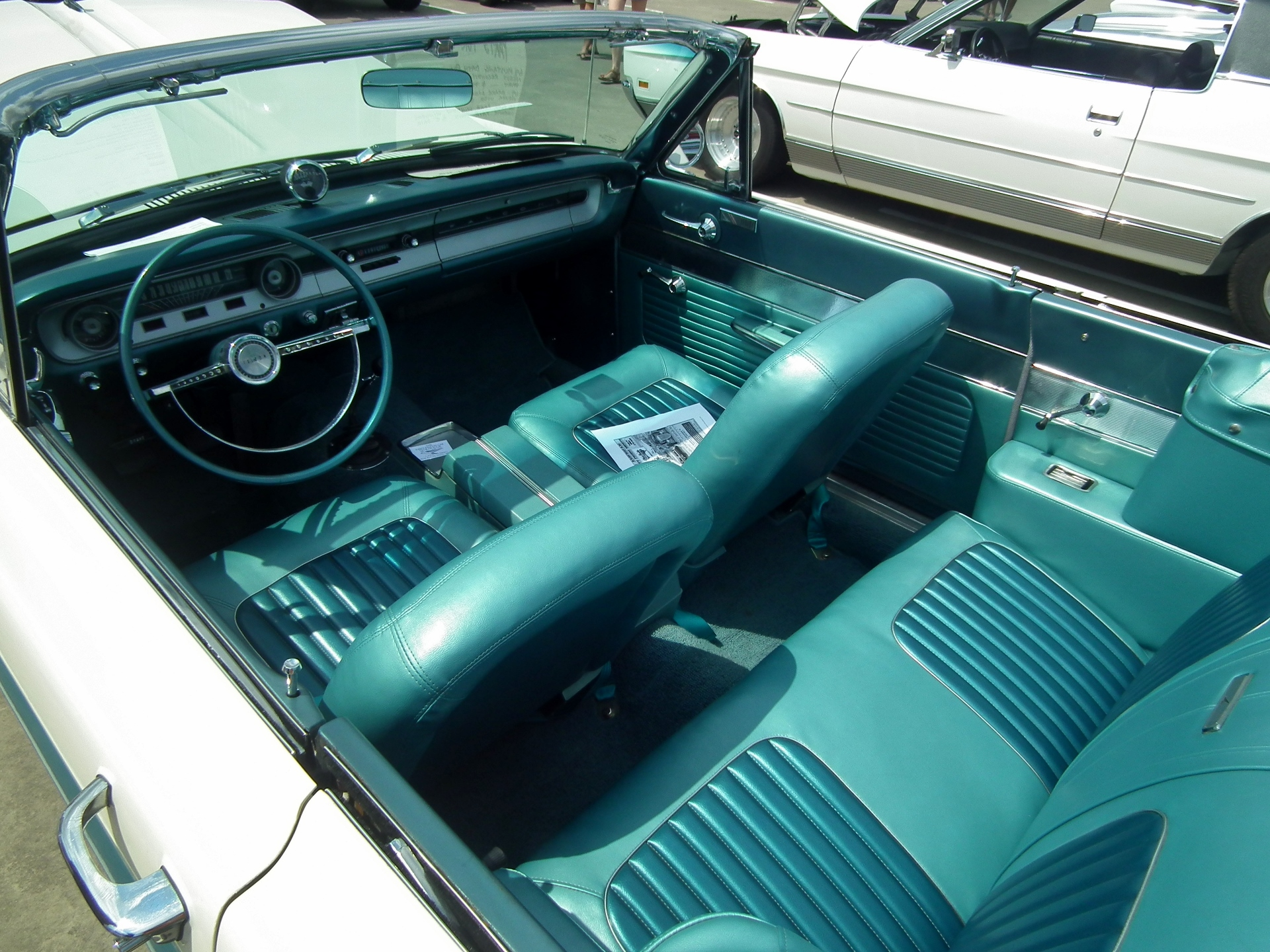
1964 Ford Falcon Futura convertible interior

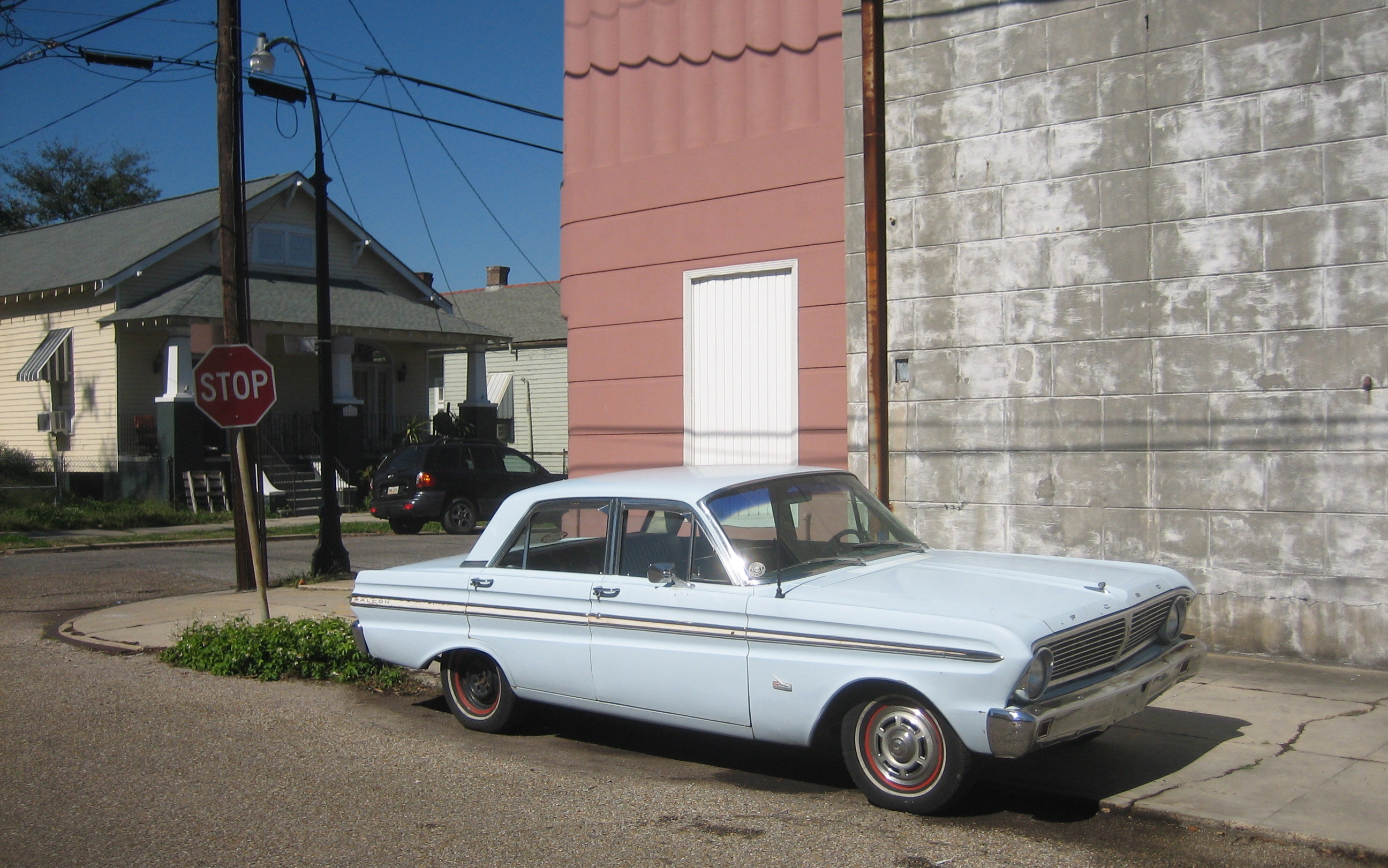
1965 Ford Falcon Futura 4-Door Sedan

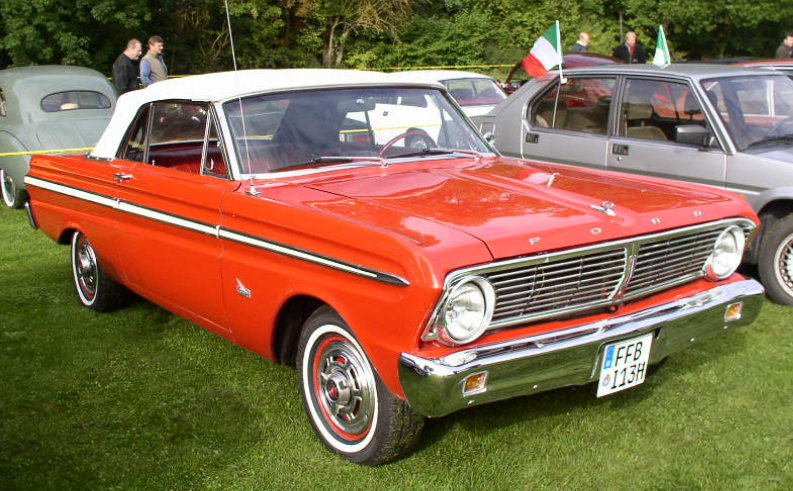
1965 Ford Falcon Futura Convertible

== Third generation (1966–1970) ==
Third generation
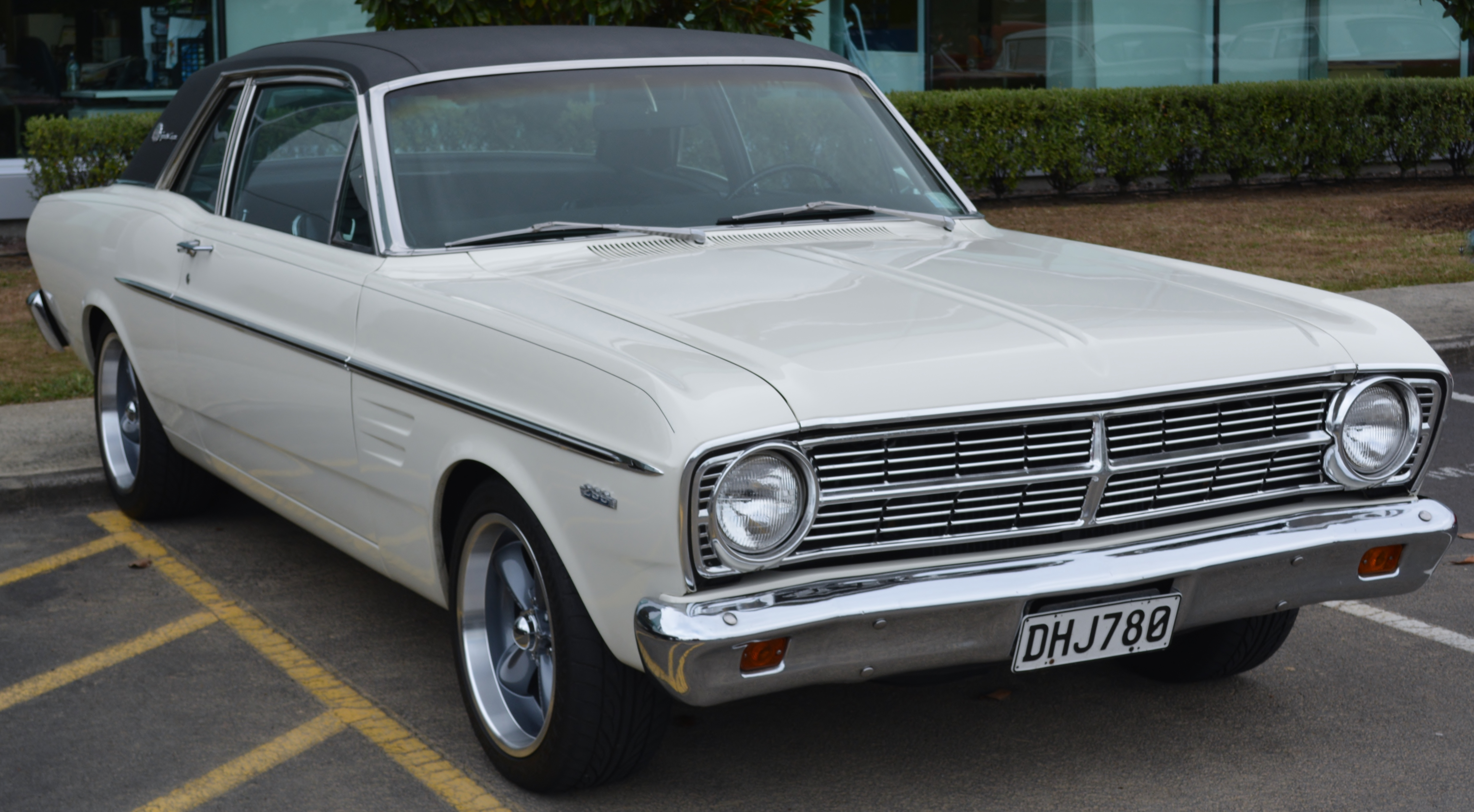
- 1967 Ford Falcon Futura Sports Coupe

Overview
- Production: 1965–1970
- Assembly: Edison, New Jersey (⧉); Claycomo, Missouri (⧉); Cuautitlán, Mexico (⧉); Talbotville, Ontario, Canada (⧉); Casablanca, Chile (⧉)

Body and chassis
- Body style: 2-door coupe 4-door sedan 5-door station wagon
- Chassis: Unibody
- Related: Ford Econoline; Ford Ranchero; Ford Fairlane; Mercury Comet; Mercury Cougar; Ford Mustang

Powertrain
- Engine: 144 cu in (2.4 L) Thriftpower I6; 170 cu in (2.8 L) Thriftpower I6; 200 cu in (3.3 L) Thriftpower I6; 260 cu in (4.3 L) Windsor V8; 289 cu in (4.7 L) Windsor V8; 302 cu in (4.9 L) Windsor V8

Dimensions
- Wheelbase: 111 in (2,819 mm) (coupe, sedan); 113 in (2,870 mm) (wagon)
- Length: 184.3 in (4,681 mm)
- Width: 73.2 in (1,859 mm)

In late 1965, Ford launched the third generation Falcon, based on a shortened Fairlane platform with revised styling. At the top of the line was the highly trimmed Futura Sports Coupe, which featured chrome side window frames, giving this two-door sedan the look of a hardtop. It also featured a premium all-vinyl interior. Large "Sports Coupe" script on the "C" pillar was borrowed from the 1964–1965 Fairlane Sports Coupe. The heater-defroster became standard. Brakes were 9-in for six-cylinder Falcons, and 10-in for V8s. The two-door hardtop and convertible were dropped, while the station wagon and Ranchero were moved to a larger platform shared with the contemporary Fairlane. The Ranchero left the Falcon line and adopted the Fairlane's front sheet metal for 1967. The 1966 Falcon was used in the Trans-Am series. The 1967 models were mostly the same as the 1966 models, but more Federally-mandated safety equipment was added, including a dual-circuit brake system, energy-absorbing steering wheel with a large, padded center hub, 4-way flashers, soft interior panels, and mountings for front shoulder belts (which were available as an option). A reminder light was added for the seatbelts; 1968 was the first model year for the square tail lights.

1968 and 1969 Falcons got new side marker lights or reflectors, front outboard shoulder belts, and headrests for cars built after January 1, 1969. The basic body and mechanical specifications remained the same as 1966–1967 models.

The final model year for the Falcon in North America was 1970. Continuing sales declines and the inability of the car to meet forthcoming safety standards resulted in a short run of 1970 models identical to the 1969 version being built through the end of December, 1969; none of the 1970-model Falcons used a locking steering column that would be standard on all other 1970 Ford products (except Mavericks built before September 1969). "Despite the listing of a plain Falcon series in some early literature, it appears that all Falcons bore the Futura name this year." Although the Falcon, Fairlane, and Fairlane 500 names would disappear, the Futura name would reappear in 1978 on the Fairmont Futura Sport Coupe.

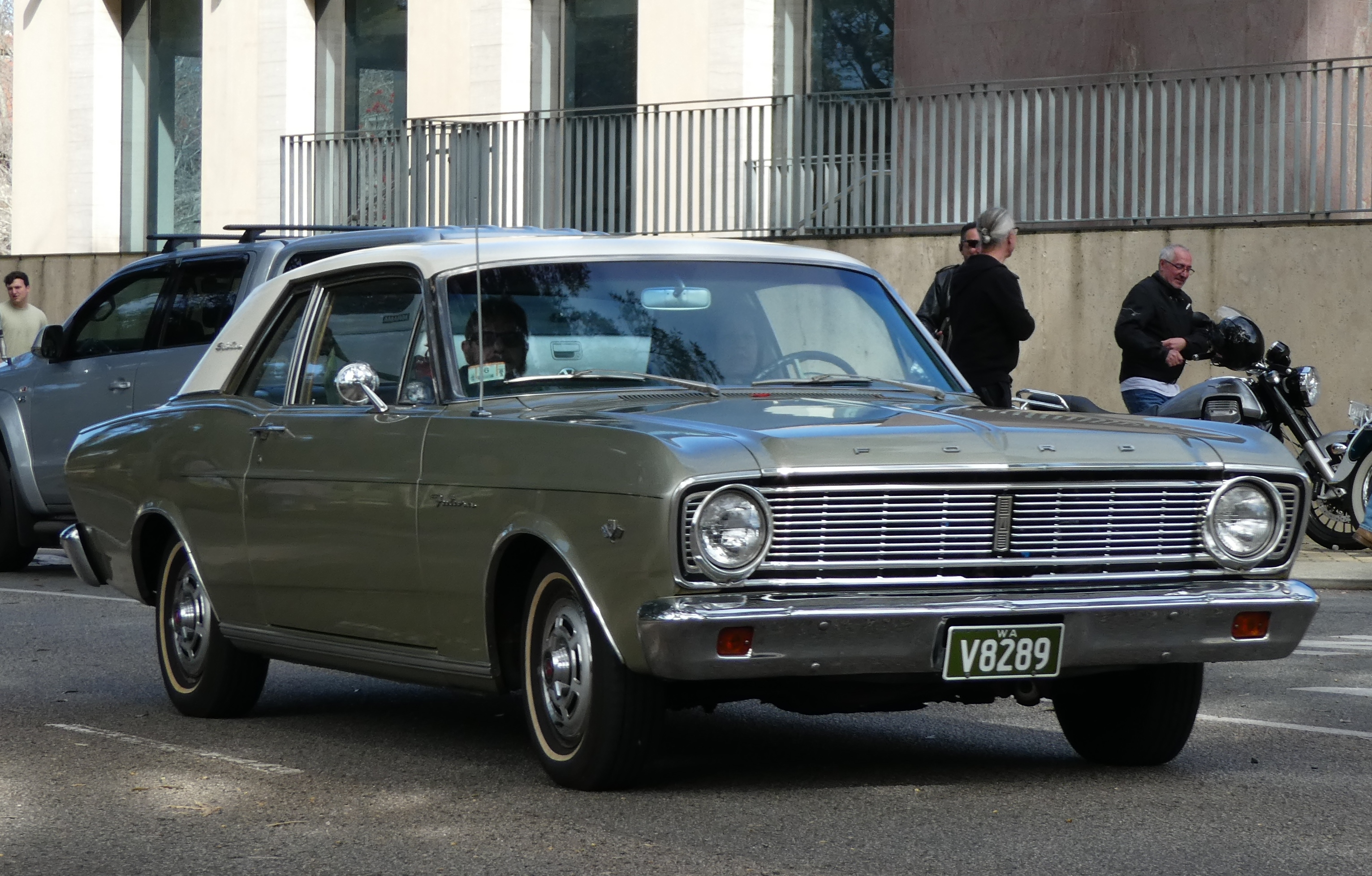
1966 Ford Falcon Futura Sports Coupe

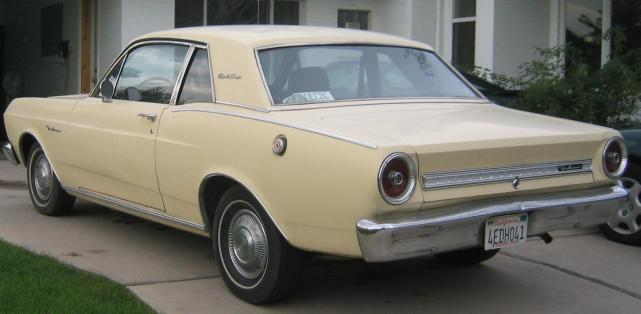
1966 Ford Falcon Sports Coupe

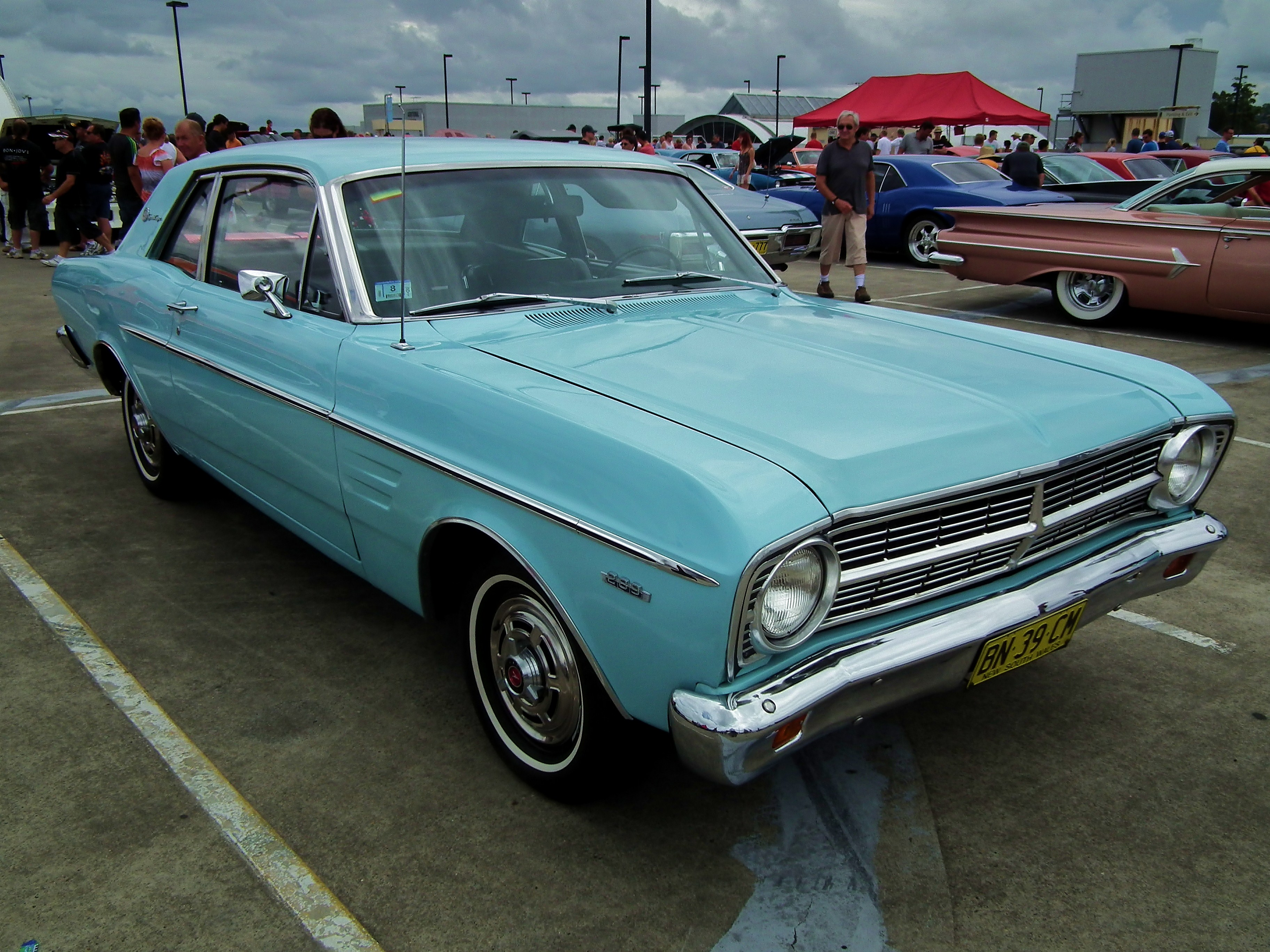
1967 Ford Falcon Futura Sports Coupe

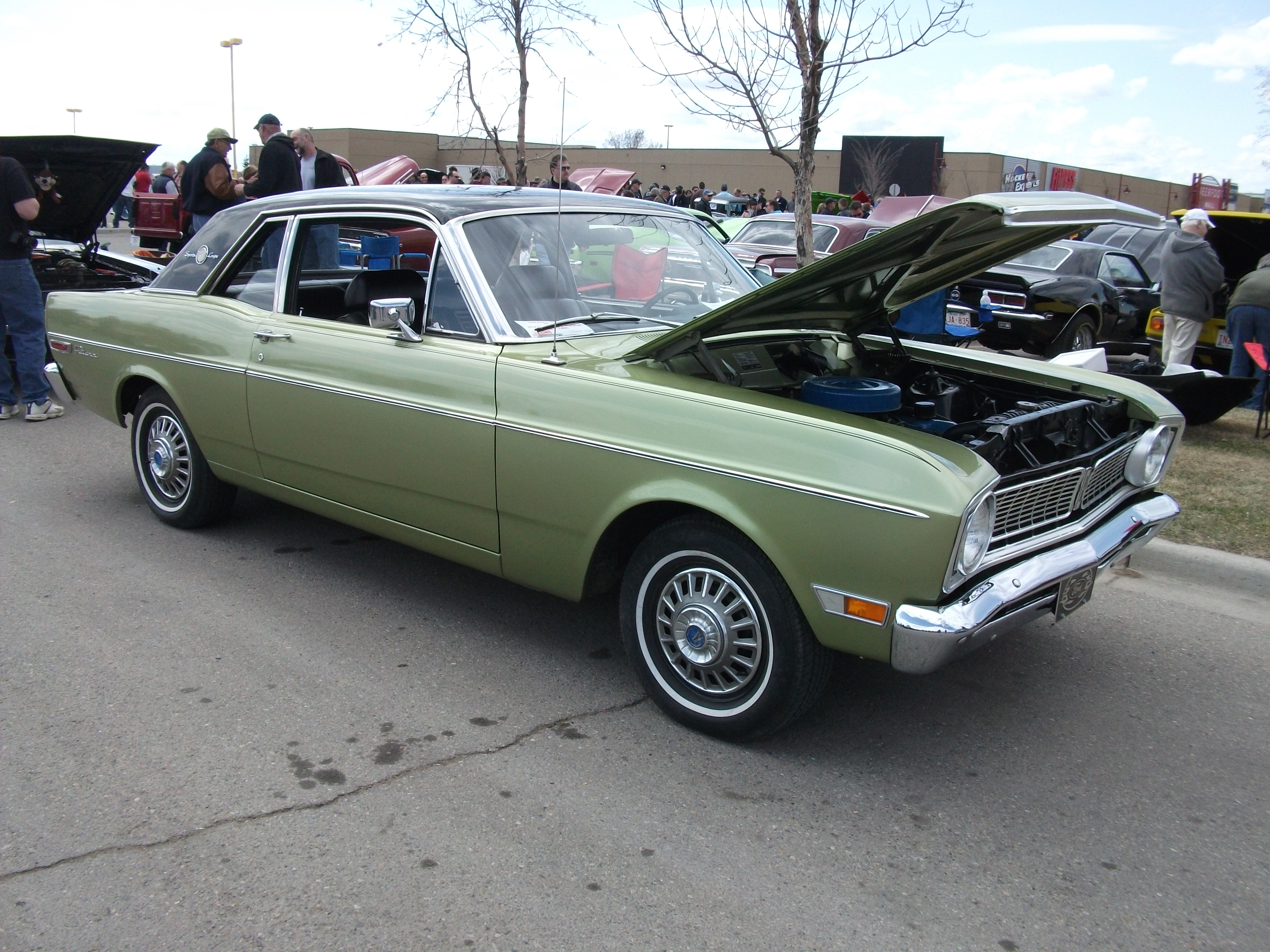
1968 Ford Falcon Futura Sports Coupe

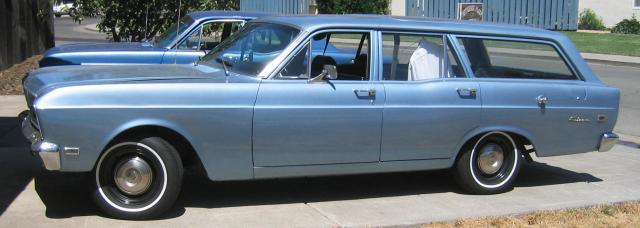
1969 Falcon Station Wagon

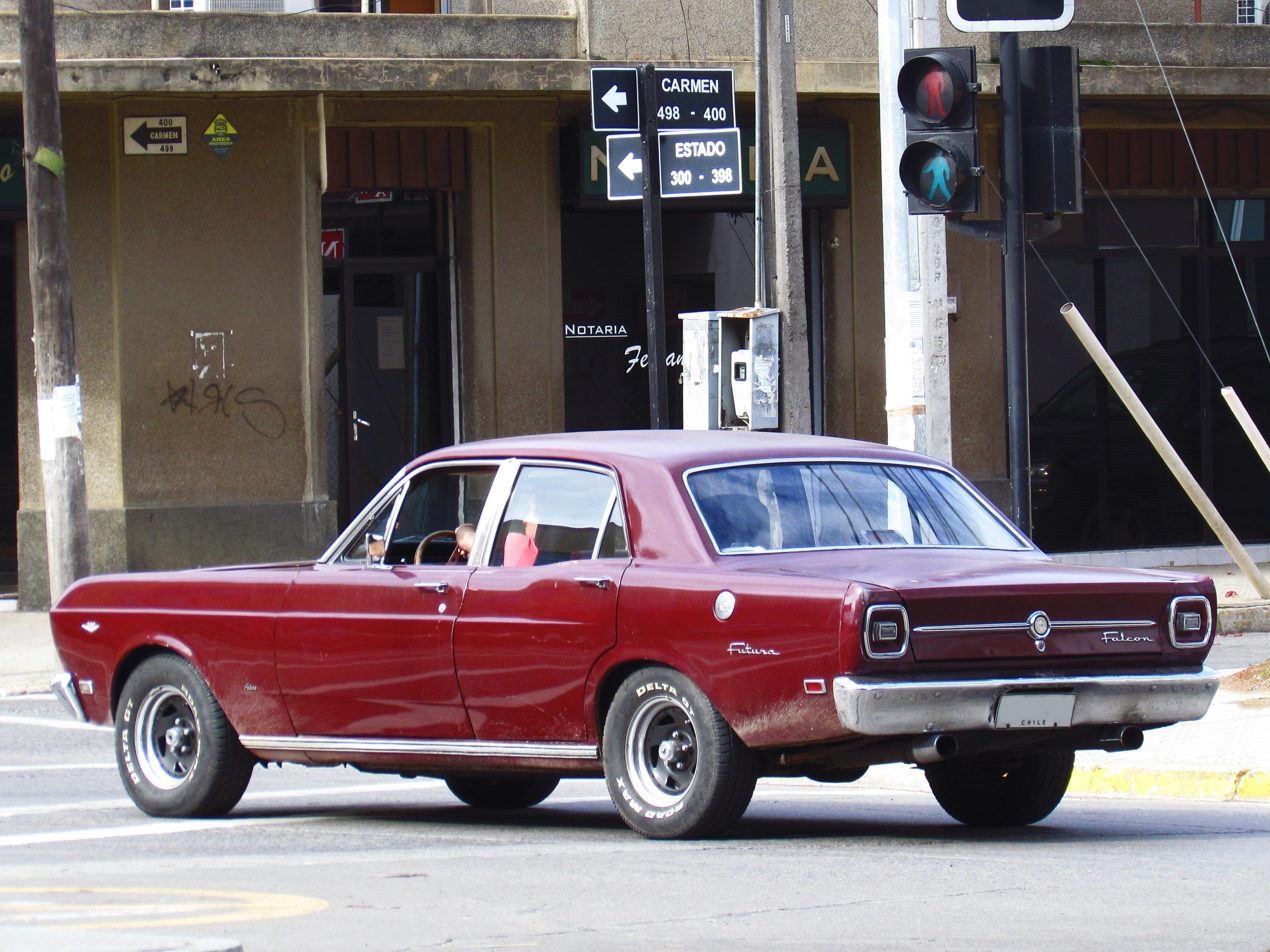
1970 Ford Falcon Futura 4-Door Sedan (with after-market wheels)

== Intermediate Falcon (1970½) ==
1970½ Falcon
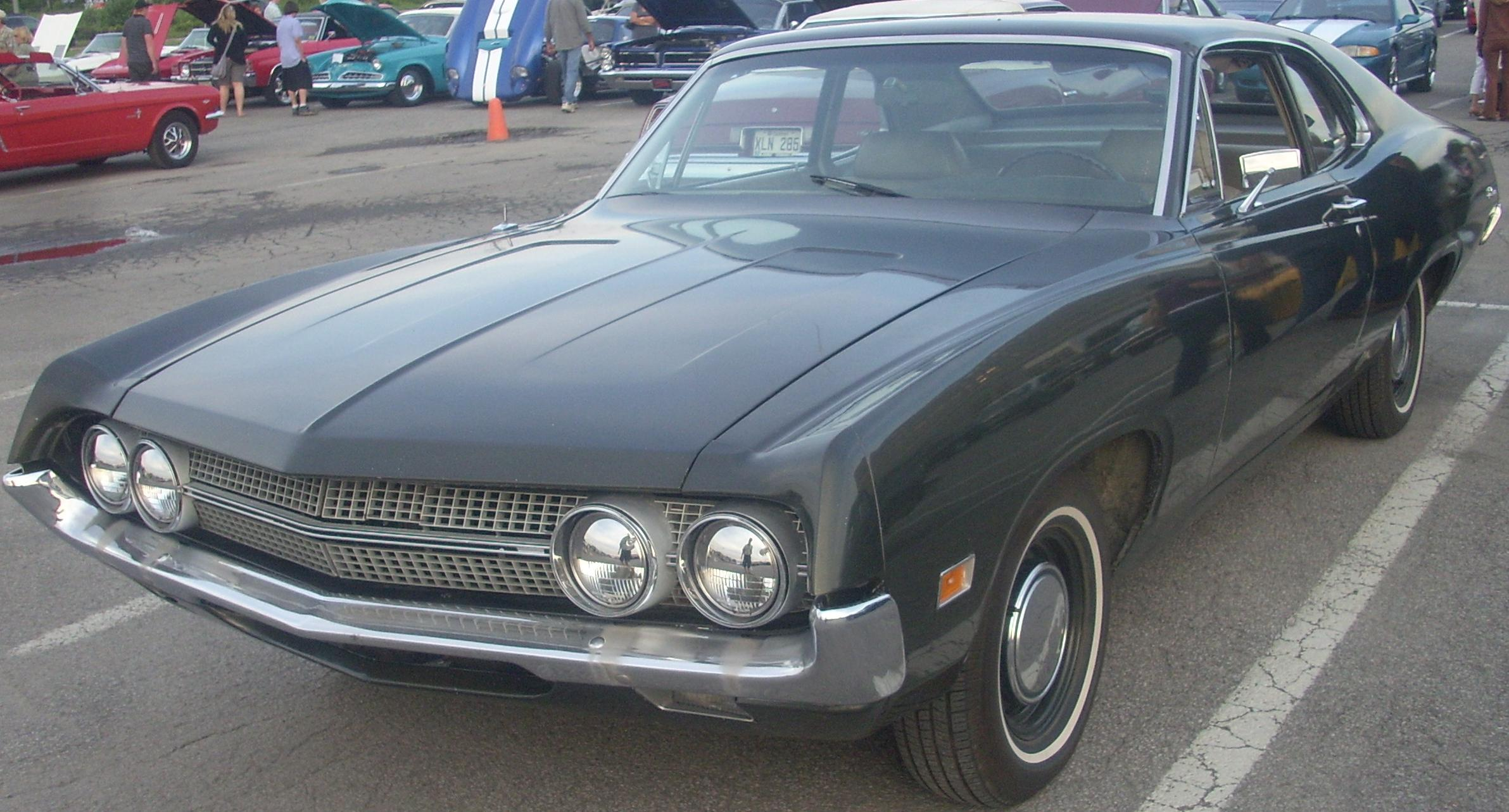
- 1970½ Ford Falcon 2-Door Sedan

Overview
- Production: 1970
- Model years: 1970 (designated as 1970½)

Body and chassis
- Body style: 2-door sedan 4-door sedan 5-door station wagon
- Chassis: Unibody
- Related: Ford Fairlane; Ford Torino; Mercury Montego

Powertrain
- Engine: 250 cu in (4.1 L) I6; 302 cu in (4.9 L) V8; 351 cu in (5.8 L) V8; 429 cu in (7.0 L) V8

Dimensions
- Wheelbase: 117 in (3,000 mm) (sedans); 114 in (2,900 mm) (wagon)
- Length: 206.2 in (5,240 mm) (sedans); 209 in (5,300 mm) (wagon)
- Width: 76.7 in (1,950 mm) (2-door sedan), 76.4 in (1,940 mm) (4-door sedan); 75.4 in (1,920 mm) (wagon)
- Height: 52.3 in (1,330 mm) (2-door sedan), 53.1 in (1,350 mm) (4-door sedan); 55.7 in (1,410 mm) (wagon)
- Curb weight: 3,242 lb (1,471 kg) (2-door sedan), 3,258 lb (1,478 kg) (4-door sedan); 3,635 lb (1,649 kg) (wagon)

After a shortened 1970 model year, the third-generation Falcon was replaced by the Ford Maverick. As a mid-year introduction (designated as a 1970½ model year), Ford returned the Falcon nameplate for a second time, using it for its entry-level intermediate line (slotted below the Ford Fairlane and Ford Torino). To comply with federal safety regulations, the Falcon was fitted with a locking steering column and 3-point outboard seatbelts.

Distinguished from its higher-trim counterparts by its lack of grille badging, the 1970½ Falcon was offered in three body styles: a two-door pillared sedan (a body unique to the Falcon) and a four-door sedan and five-door station wagon (shared with the Fairlane and Torino).

As the lowest-price intermediate series, the Falcon was marketed with a limited number of luxury and convenience options, including standard manual windows (optional power windows were limited to the station wagon) and radios demoted to optional status. The model line was offered with the entire range of powertrains available to Ford intermediates, ranging from a 155 hp (116 kW) 250 cubic-inch inline-6 to the 370 hp (276 kW) 429 Cobra Jet Ram Air V8.

For 1971, Ford adopted the Torino nameplate across its entire intermediate model line, leading to the retirement of both the Falcon and Fairlane nameplates in North America.

== Other uses of name ==
Variations of the Ford Falcon were manufactured in Argentina, Australia, Canada, Chile and Mexico. Early Mexican built versions of the Ford Maverick used the Falcon Maverick name.

From 1961 to 1967, passenger versions of the Ford Econoline and Ford Club Wagon were marketed under the Ford Falcon name.

== See also ==
- Ford Falcon (Argentina)
- Ford Falcon (Australia)
- Ford Ranchero
- Mercury Comet
- Ford E-Series (re Ford Falcon passenger van)
- Frontenac
