= Frontenac (marque) =

- 1960 Frontenac 2-door sedan (with non-standard wheel covers)

Overview
- Manufacturer: Ford of Canada
- Production: 1960
- Assembly: Oakville, Ontario, Canada

Body and chassis
- Class: Compact
- Body style: 2-door sedan 4-door sedan 2-door station wagon 4-door station wagon
- Layout: FR layout
- Related: Ford Falcon (US); Comet

Powertrain
- Engine: 144 cu in (2.4 L) Thriftpower I6

Chronology
- Successor: Comet

In 1960, Ford Canada introduced the Frontenac to give Mercury-Meteor dealers a compact vehicle to sell. It was a separate marque, as Lincoln was to Ford, and was marketed as such. Produced for the 1960 model year only, the Frontenac was essentially a 1960 Ford Falcon with its own unique grille, tail lights, and external trim, including red maple-leaf insignia. It was the second-best selling compact in Canada during its one year (5% of Ford's total Canadian output).

A total of 9,536 Frontenacs were built at its Oakville, Ontario, plant. In August 1960 a prototype 1961 Frontenac was driven from Halifax to Vancouver for a photo shoot only for the crew to learn that the Canadian model was discontinued from the domestic market and replaced by the Comet for the 1961 model year.

At launch the Frontenac was available in 2-door and 4-door sedan body styles with 2-door and 4-door station wagons added later.

The Frontenac is one example of U.S. automakers' attempts to market slight variations of U.S. models as unique Canadian makes. Like the Monarch and Meteor brands marketed by the Ford Motor Company of Canada, the Frontenac was not part of the Ford or Mercury lines.

The Frontenac was named after a late 17th-century governor of New France. The name had been used previously, from 1931 to 1933, on a car assembled in Toronto by Dominion Motors.

Model Information

Name	Engine	HP	Voltage	Transmission	Wheelbase	Length	Width
Frontenac	144 CID I6	90	12	3-speed manual; 2-speed automatic	109.5 in (2,781 mm)	181.2 in (4,602 mm)	70 in (1,778 mm)
