= 1997 Eagle Boys 3 Hour Bathurst Showroom Showdown =

Seasons
- ← none 1998 →

Layout of the Mount Panorama Circuit

The 1997 Eagle Boys 3 Hour Bathurst Showroom Showdown as was an endurance race for "GT Production" cars. The event was staged at the Mount Panorama Circuit, Bathurst, New South Wales, Australia, on 18 October 1997.

The race was held as a support event for the 1997 Primus 1000 Classic.

The race was won by the Ross Palmer Motorsport Ferrari F355 of Gary Waldon and John Bowe.

== Class structure ==
Entries were divided into the following classes:

- Class A: Super Cars
- Class B: High Performance Cars
- Class C: Production Cars over 2.5 litre
- Class D: Production Cars 1.8 to 2.5 litre
- Class E: Production Cars up to 1.8 litre

== Results ==
Pos.	Class	No.	Team / Entrant	Drivers	Car	Laps	Time/Retired
Pos.	Class	No.	Team / Entrant	Drivers	Engine	Laps	Time/Retired
1	A	27	Positive Hype Pty Ltd	John Bowe; Gary Waldon	Ferrari F355 Challenge	67	3:01:41.3214
1	A	27	Positive Hype Pty Ltd	John Bowe; Gary Waldon	3.5 L Ferrari Tipo F129B V8	67	3:01:41.3214
2	A	3	Falken Tyres	Peter Fitzgerald; Jim Richards	Porsche 993 RSCS	67	+5.977
2	A	3	Falken Tyres	Peter Fitzgerald; Jim Richards	3.6 L Porsche M64 H6	67	+5.977
3	A	8	Ed Aitken	Ed Aitken; Kevin Weeks	Porsche 993 RSCS	67	+16.737
3	A	8	Ed Aitken	Ed Aitken; Kevin Weeks	3.6 L Porsche M64 H6	67	+16.737
4	A	46	Dunn & Farrucia Racing	Max Dunn; Rusty French; Rod Wilson	Porsche 993 RSCS	66	+1 lap
4	A	46	Dunn & Farrucia Racing	Max Dunn; Rusty French; Rod Wilson	3.6 L Porsche M64 H6	66	+1 lap
5	A	5	Wagon Wheels Chrysler Jeep	Neal Bates; Neil Hannemann; Ray Lintott	Dodge Viper GTS Coupe	66	+1 lap
5	A	5	Wagon Wheels Chrysler Jeep	Neal Bates; Neil Hannemann; Ray Lintott	8.0 L Chrysler Viper SR V10	66	+1 lap
6	A	28	Ross Palmer Motorsport	Greg Crick; Ross Palmer	Ferrari F355 Challenge	65	+2 laps
6	A	28	Ross Palmer Motorsport	Greg Crick; Ross Palmer	3.5 L Ferrari Tipo F129B V8	65	+2 laps
7	A	10	Cisco System Maserati	Alfredo Costanzo; Peter McKay	Maserati Ghilbi Open Cup	63	+4 laps
7	A	10	Cisco System Maserati	Alfredo Costanzo; Peter McKay	2.0 L Maserati AM577 twin-turbocharged V6	63	+4 laps
8	A	26	Ross Almond	Ross Almond; Trevor John	Mitsubishi Lancer RS-Evolution III	62	+5 laps
8	A	26	Ross Almond	Ross Almond; Trevor John	2.0 L Mitsubishi Sirius 4G63 turbocharged I4	62	+5 laps
9	B	26	Acorn Car Rentals; Osborne Motorsport	Colin Osborne; Anthony Robson	Toyota MR2 Bathurst	62	+5 laps
9	B	26	Acorn Car Rentals; Osborne Motorsport	Colin Osborne; Anthony Robson	2.0 L Toyota 3S-GE I4	62	+5 laps
10	D	29	Calvin Gardiner	Calvin Gardiner; Tom Watkinson	Mazda 626	62	+5 laps
10	D	29	Calvin Gardiner	Calvin Gardiner; Tom Watkinson	2.5 L Mazda KL-DE V6	62	+5 laps
11	B	66	Ian McAlister	Gary Baxter; Ian McAlister	Volvo 850 T-5R	62	+5 laps
11	B	66	Ian McAlister	Gary Baxter; Ian McAlister	2.3 L Volvo B5234T5 turbocharged I5	62	+5 laps
12	D	71	Rebound Clothing	Matt Lehmann; Megan Lehmann; Phil Lehmann	Mazda 626	61	+6 laps
12	D	71	Rebound Clothing	Matt Lehmann; Megan Lehmann; Phil Lehmann	2.5 L Mazda KL-DE V6	61	+6 laps
13	B	7	Peter M Boylan	Peter Boylan; Jenni Thompson	Subaru Impreza WRX	61	+6 laps
13	B	7	Peter M Boylan	Peter Boylan; Jenni Thompson	2.0 L Subaru EJ turbocharged H4	61	+6 laps
14	D	23	Bruce Lynton	Beric Lynton; Bruce Lynton	BMW 323i	61	+6 laps
14	D	23	Bruce Lynton	Beric Lynton; Bruce Lynton	2.5 L BMW M52 I6	61	+6 laps
15	B	35	Guy Gibbons	Guy Gibbons; Bob Thorn	Subaru Impreza WRX	60	+7 laps
15	B	35	Guy Gibbons	Guy Gibbons; Bob Thorn	2.0 L Subaru EJ turbocharged H4	60	+7 laps
16	B	49	Acorn Car Rentals; Osborne Motorsport	Adam Kaplan; Mark Williams	Toyota MR2 Bathurst	60	+7 laps
16	B	49	Acorn Car Rentals; Osborne Motorsport	Adam Kaplan; Mark Williams	2.0 L Toyota 3S-GE I4	60	+7 laps
17	C	44	Prodrive Racing	Paul Gover; Chris Nixon; Michael Stahl	Ford EL Falcon XR6	60	+7 laps
17	C	44	Prodrive Racing	Paul Gover; Chris Nixon; Michael Stahl	4.0 L Ford I6	60	+7 laps
18	C	20	3D Performance	Robert Chadwick; Andrew Heathershaw; Steve Knight	Mitsubishi TE Magna	60	+7 laps
18	C	20	3D Performance	Robert Chadwick; Andrew Heathershaw; Steve Knight	3.0 L Mitsubishi Cyclone 6G72 V6	60	+7 laps
19	E	11	Andrej Pavicevic	Andrej Pavicevic; Trevor Sheumack	Suzuki Swift GTi	60	+7 laps
19	E	11	Andrej Pavicevic	Andrej Pavicevic; Trevor Sheumack	1.3 L Suzuki G13B I4	60	+7 laps
20	C	99	Prodrive Racing	Dennis Cribben; Chris Sexton	Ford EL Falcon XR6	59	+8 laps
20	C	99	Prodrive Racing	Dennis Cribben; Chris Sexton	4.0 L Ford I6	59	+8 laps
21	E	60	Trevor Haines	Trevor Haines; Malcolm Stenniken	Ford Laser TX3	59	+8 laps
21	E	60	Trevor Haines	Trevor Haines; Malcolm Stenniken	1.8 L Mazda BP I4	59	+8 laps
22	D	33	Burswood Motorsport	Grant Johnson; Allan Letcher	Honda Civic VTIR	58	+9 laps
22	D	33	Burswood Motorsport	Grant Johnson; Allan Letcher	1.6 L Honda B16B I4	58	+9 laps
23	E	37	Nathan Thomas	Glen Jorden; Nathan Thomas	Suzuki Swift GTi	58	+9 laps
23	E	37	Nathan Thomas	Glen Jorden; Nathan Thomas	1.3 L Suzuki G13B I4	58	+9 laps
24	E	22	Carlos Rolfo	Danny Brian; Carlos Rolfo	Suzuki Swift GTi	58	+9 laps
24	E	22	Carlos Rolfo	Danny Brian; Carlos Rolfo	1.3 L Suzuki G13B I4	58	+9 laps
DNF	A	9	John Bourke	John Bourke; Paul Stokell	Toyota Supra RZ Twin Turbo	52	
DNF	A	9	John Bourke	John Bourke; Paul Stokell	3.0 L Toyota 2JZ-GTE twin-turbo I6	52	
DNF	B	2	John Cowley	John Cowley; Wayne Park	HSV VS GTS-R	51	
DNF	B	2	John Cowley	John Cowley; Wayne Park	5.7 L HSV 215i V8	51	
DNF	A	21	Carlos Rolfo	David Scott; Wayne Selby	Nissan 300ZX Twin Turbo	46	
DNF	A	21	Carlos Rolfo	David Scott; Wayne Selby	3.0 L Nissan VG30DETT twin-turbo V6	46	
DNF	B	38	Ryan McLeod	Ryan McLeod; Darren Palmer; Damien White	Subaru Impreza WRX	32	
DNF	B	38	Ryan McLeod	Ryan McLeod; Darren Palmer; Damien White	2.0 L Subaru EJ turbocharged H4	32	
DNF	D	16	Peter Phelan	Peter Phelan; David Wood	Peugeot 405 Mi 16	26	
DNF	D	16	Peter Phelan	Peter Phelan; David Wood	1.9 L PSA XUD I4	26	
DNF	E	42	Nigel Stones	Graham Stones; Nigel Stones	Suzuki Swift GTi	26	
DNF	E	42	Nigel Stones	Graham Stones; Nigel Stones	1.3 L Suzuki G13B I4	26	
DNF	C	55	Mark Cohen	Mark Cohen; Terry Shiel	Holden VS Commodore SS	23	
DNF	C	55	Mark Cohen	Mark Cohen; Terry Shiel	5.0 L Holden 5000i V8	23	
DNF	B	25	Richard Davis	Richard Davis; Bill Lakestins; Chris Smerdon	HSV VS GTS-R	10	
DNF	B	25	Richard Davis	Richard Davis; Bill Lakestins; Chris Smerdon	5.7 L HSV 215i V8	10	
DNF	B	6	Nepean EFI	Chris Koursparis; Anthony Wilson	Subaru Impreza WRX	2	
DNF	B	6	Nepean EFI	Chris Koursparis; Anthony Wilson	2.0 L Subaru EJ turbocharged H4	2	
