= 1999 Poolrite GTP Bathurst Showroom Showdown =

Car race

Seasons
- ← 1998 2000 →

Layout of the Mount Panorama Circuit

The 1999 Poolrite GTP Bathurst Showroom Showdown was an endurance race for GT Production Cars. The event was staged at the Mount Panorama Circuit, Bathurst, New South Wales on 13 November 1999 over a three-hour duration.

The race was won by Terry Bosnjak and Mark Williamson driving a Mazda RX-7 SP Turbo.

== Class structure ==
The field was divided into the following six classes:

- Class A : Super Cars under $300,000
- Class B : High Performance Cars & Sports Cars under $89,000 (Including Turbocharged All Wheel Drive)
- Class C : Production Touring Cars under 5000cc, Two Wheel Drive & under $47,000
- Class D : Production Touring Cars under 2500cc, Front Wheel Drive & under $37,000
- Class E : Production Touring Cars under 1850cc, Front Wheel Drive & under $26,000
- Class S : Sports, Performance Cars under 2600cc and under $63,000

== Results ==
Pos.	Class	No.	Team / Entrant	Drivers	Car	Laps	Time/Retired
Pos.	Class	No.	Team / Entrant	Drivers	Engine	Laps	Time/Retired
1	A	41	Terry Bosnjak	Terry Bosnjak; Mark Williamson	Mazda RX-7 SP Turbo	61	3:02:27.0017
1	A	41	Terry Bosnjak	Terry Bosnjak; Mark Williamson	1.3 L Mazda 13B-REW twin-turbocharged twin-rotor	61	3:02:27.0017
2	A	8	Ed Aitken	Ed Aitken; John Faulkner	Porsche 993 RSCS	61	+9.076
2	A	8	Ed Aitken	Ed Aitken; John Faulkner	3.8 L Porsche M64 H6	61	+9.076
3	A	11	Car Imports Australia	Jamie Cartwright; Aaron McGill	Toyota Supra RZ Twin Turbo	60	+1 lap
3	A	11	Car Imports Australia	Jamie Cartwright; Aaron McGill	3.0 L Toyota 2JZ-GTE twin-turbo I6	60	+1 lap
4	A	93	Matthew Stoupas	Christian D'Agostin; Matthew Stoupas	Porsche 993 RSCS	60	+1 lap
4	A	93	Matthew Stoupas	Christian D'Agostin; Matthew Stoupas	3.8 L Porsche M64 H6	60	+1 lap
5	B	6	Nepean EFI	Mark Brame; Chris Koursparis	Subaru Impreza WRX	60	+1 lap
5	B	6	Nepean EFI	Mark Brame; Chris Koursparis	2.0 L Subaru EJ turbocharged H4	60	+1 lap
6	A	7	Ross Almond	Peter Boylan; Ross Palmer	Mitsubishi Lancer RS-E Evolution V	60	+1 lap
6	A	7	Ross Almond	Peter Boylan; Ross Palmer	2.0 L Mitsubishi Sirius 4G63 turbocharged I4	60	+1 lap
7	B	96	Don Pulver	Don Pulver; Terry Shiel	Subaru Impreza WRX	59	+2 laps
7	B	96	Don Pulver	Don Pulver; Terry Shiel	2.0 L Subaru EJ turbocharged H4	59	+2 laps
8	A	45	Statewide GT-R Racing	Mike Kilpatrick; John Teulan	Nissan Skyline GT-R	59	+2 laps
8	A	45	Statewide GT-R Racing	Mike Kilpatrick; John Teulan	2.6 L Nissan RB26DETT twin-turbocharged I6	59	+2 laps
9	B	91	James McKnoulty	Gary Deane; Jim McKnoulty	Subaru Impreza WRX	58	+3 laps
9	B	91	James McKnoulty	Gary Deane; Jim McKnoulty	2.0 L Subaru EJ turbocharged H4	58	+3 laps
10	A	56	Peak Performance	Terry Finnigan; Ben Walsh	BMW M3-R	58	+3 laps
10	A	56	Peak Performance	Terry Finnigan; Ben Walsh	3.0 L BMW S50 I6	58	+3 laps
11	A	63	Paul Mitolo	Julian Mazzone; Paul Mitolo	Mazda RX-7 SP Turbo	58	+3 laps
11	A	63	Paul Mitolo	Julian Mazzone; Paul Mitolo	1.3 L Mazda 13B-REW twin-turbocharged twin-rotor	58	+3 laps
12	C	16	Peter Phelan	Peter Phelan; David Wood	Holden VT Commodore SS	58	+3 laps
12	C	16	Peter Phelan	Peter Phelan; David Wood	5.0 L Holden 5000i V8	58	+3 laps
13	C	60	Longhurst Racing	Guy Andrews; Tony Longhurst	Ford AU Falcon XR6	58	+3 laps
13	C	60	Longhurst Racing	Guy Andrews; Tony Longhurst	4.0 L Ford Intech HP I6	58	+3 laps
14	A	57	Graham Alexander	Graham Alexander; John Woodbury	Mitsubishi Lancer RS-E Evolution V	57	+4 laps
14	A	57	Graham Alexander	Graham Alexander; John Woodbury	2.0 L Mitsubishi Sirius 4G63 turbocharged I4	57	+4 laps
15	C	20	Robert Chadwick	Robert Chadwick; Steve Knight	Mitsubishi TH Magna Sport V6	57	+4 laps
15	C	20	Robert Chadwick	Robert Chadwick; Steve Knight	3.0 L Mitsubishi Cyclone 6G72 V6	57	+4 laps
16	C	95	John McIlroy	John McIlroy; Brett Youlden	Ford AU Falcon XR8	57	+4 laps
16	C	95	John McIlroy	John McIlroy; Brett Youlden	5.0 L Ford Windsor V8	57	+4 laps
17	C	46	Ryan McLeod	Peter McLeod; Ryan McLeod; Peter Verheyen	Ford EL Falcon XR6	57	+4 laps
17	C	46	Ryan McLeod	Peter McLeod; Ryan McLeod; Peter Verheyen	4.0 L Thriftpower Six I6	57	+4 laps
18	C	88	Nepean EFI	David Ratcliff; Ron Searle	Toyota Camry CSi	57	+4 laps
18	C	88	Nepean EFI	David Ratcliff; Ron Searle	3.0 L Toyota 1MZ-FE V6	57	+4 laps
19	C	33	Roland Hill	Dennis Cribbin; Roland Hill	Holden VS Commodore Executive V8	56	+5 laps
19	C	33	Roland Hill	Dennis Cribbin; Roland Hill	5.0 L Holden 5000i V8	56	+5 laps
20	S	32	Bruce Lynton	Bruce Lynton; Ian Simpson	BMW 323i	56	+5 laps
20	S	32	Bruce Lynton	Bruce Lynton; Ian Simpson	2.5 L BMW M52 I6	56	+5 laps
21	D	28	Gibson Motorsport	Greg Murphy; Steven Richards	Holden Vectra GL 2.2	56	+5 laps
21	D	28	Gibson Motorsport	Greg Murphy; Steven Richards	2.2 L Holden Family II C22SEL I4	56	+5 laps
22	E	21	Kosi Kalaitzidis	Paul Gover; Peter McKay	Proton M21 Coupe	56	+5 laps
22	E	21	Kosi Kalaitzidis	Paul Gover; Peter McKay	1.8 L Mitsubishi 4G93 I4	56	+5 laps
23	B	50	Scott Jacob	Scott Jacob; Grant Kenny	Subaru Impreza WRX	56	+5 laps
23	B	50	Scott Jacob	Scott Jacob; Grant Kenny	2.0 L Subaru EJ turbocharged H4	56	+5 laps
24	S	26	Wayne Russell	Robert Middleton; Wayne Russell	BMW 323i	55	+6 laps
24	S	26	Wayne Russell	Robert Middleton; Wayne Russell	2.5 L BMW M52 I6	55	+6 laps
25	D	43	Calvin Gardiner	Grant Denyer; Tom Watkinson	Mazda 626	55	+6 laps
25	D	43	Calvin Gardiner	Grant Denyer; Tom Watkinson	2.5 L Mazda KL-DE V6	55	+6 laps
26	D	17	Gibson Motorsport	Sam Newman; Melinda Price	Holden Vectra GL 2.2	55	+6 laps
26	D	17	Gibson Motorsport	Sam Newman; Melinda Price	2.2 L Holden Family II C22SEL I4	55	+6 laps
27	S	35	Osborne Motorsport	Ian Freeman; Daniel Wilkie	Toyota MR2 Bathurst	55	+6 laps
27	S	35	Osborne Motorsport	Ian Freeman; Daniel Wilkie	2.0 L Toyota 3S-GE I4	55	+6 laps
28	C	62	Scott Loadsman	Scott Loadsman; Allan Martin	Holden VT Commodore SS	55	+6 laps
28	C	62	Scott Loadsman	Scott Loadsman; Allan Martin	5.0 L Holden 5000i V8	55	+6 laps
29	E	67	John Dickinson	Danny Brian; Nigel Williams	Suzuki Swift GTi	54	+7 laps
29	E	67	John Dickinson	Danny Brian; Nigel Williams	1.3 L Suzuki G13B I4	54	+7 laps
30	E	36	Northshore Rallysport	Dwayne Bewley; Warren Luff; Peter Ross	Peugeot 306 Style	53	+8 laps
30	E	36	Northshore Rallysport	Dwayne Bewley; Warren Luff; Peter Ross	1.8 L Peugeot XU7 I4	53	+8 laps
31	B	15	Bob Hughes	Rick Bates; Bob Hughes	Mazda RX-7 Turbo	53	+8 laps
31	B	15	Bob Hughes	Rick Bates; Bob Hughes	1.3 L Mazda 13B-REW twin-turbocharged twin-rotor	53	+8 laps
32	E	78	Darren Best	Darren Best; Steve Cramp	Hyundai Excel Sprint	53	+8 laps
32	E	78	Darren Best	Darren Best; Steve Cramp	1.5 L Hyundai G4EK I4	53	+8 laps
33	C	64	Brian Carr	Brian Carr; Bruce Constable	Ford AU Falcon XR8	52	+9 laps
33	C	64	Brian Carr	Brian Carr; Bruce Constable	5.0 L Ford Windsor V8	52	+9 laps
34	D	10	Pace Racing	Kevin Heffernan; Carol Jackson; Gary Jackson	Honda Civic VTi-R	50	+11 laps
34	D	10	Pace Racing	Kevin Heffernan; Carol Jackson; Gary Jackson	1.6 L Honda B16A2 I4	50	+11 laps
35	C	55	Mark Cohen	Mark Cohen; Calvin Gardiner	Holden VS Commodore Executive V8	49	+12 laps
35	C	55	Mark Cohen	Mark Cohen; Calvin Gardiner	5.0 L Holden 5000i V8	49	+12 laps
36	S	13	Osborne Motorsport	Colin Osborne; Ric Shaw	Toyota MR2 Bathurst	48	+13 laps
36	S	13	Osborne Motorsport	Colin Osborne; Ric Shaw	2.0 L Toyota 3S-GE I4	48	+13 laps
37	B	34	Mark King	Mark King; Rod Wilson	Mitsubishi Lancer RS-E Evolution III	47	+14 laps
37	B	34	Mark King	Mark King; Rod Wilson	2.0 L Mitsubishi Sirius 4G63 turbocharged I4	47	+14 laps
38	E	75	Buy-A-Drive	Paul Budda; David Crowe; Sue Hughes	Suzuki Swift GTi	20	+41 laps
38	E	75	Buy-A-Drive	Paul Budda; David Crowe; Sue Hughes	1.3 L Suzuki G13B I4	20	+41 laps
DNF	A	18	Murray Carter	Murray Carter; Greg Waters	Chevrolet Corvette C5	55	
DNF	A	18	Murray Carter	Murray Carter; Greg Waters	5.7 L Chevrolet LS1 V8	55	
DNF	A	27	Ross Palmer Motorsport	Darren Palmer; Wayne Park	Ferrari F355 Challenge	46	
DNF	A	27	Ross Palmer Motorsport	Darren Palmer; Wayne Park	3.5 L Ferrari Tipo F129B V8	46	
DNF	B	25	Jayco Caravans	Richard Davis; Gary Baxter	HSV VS GTS-R 215i	42	
DNF	B	25	Jayco Caravans	Richard Davis; Gary Baxter	5.7 L HSV 215i V8	42	
DNF	A	83	Jeff Church	Jeff Church; Ross Dillon; Ray Stubber	Nissan Skyline GT-R	30	
DNF	A	83	Jeff Church	Jeff Church; Ross Dillon; Ray Stubber	2.6 L Nissan RB26DETT twin-turbocharged I6	30	
DNF	B	2	John Cowley	John Cowley; Greg Crick	HSV VS GTS-R 215i	29	
DNF	B	2	John Cowley	John Cowley; Greg Crick	5.7 L HSV 215i V8	29	
DNF	B	14	Scott's Transport	Peter Gazzard; Clyde Lawrence	Subaru Impreza WRX	27	
DNF	B	14	Scott's Transport	Peter Gazzard; Clyde Lawrence	2.0 L Subaru EJ turbocharged H4	27	
DNF	D	71	Rebound Clothing	Leanne Ferrier; Stuart Kostera	Mazda 626	19	
DNF	D	71	Rebound Clothing	Leanne Ferrier; Stuart Kostera	2.5 L Mazda KL-DE V6	19	
DNF	A	3	Falken Tyres	Peter Fitzgerald; Jim Richards	Porsche 993 RSCS	18	
DNF	A	3	Falken Tyres	Peter Fitzgerald; Jim Richards	3.8 L Porsche M64 H6	18	
DNF	A	12	Vodafone Network P/L	Domenic Beninca; Geoff Morgan	Porsche 993 RSCS	17	
DNF	A	12	Vodafone Network P/L	Domenic Beninca; Geoff Morgan	3.8 L Porsche M64 H6	17	
DNF	C	70	Daryl Coon	Daryl Coon; Dennis Penna	Ford AU Falcon XR6	16	
DNF	C	70	Daryl Coon	Daryl Coon; Dennis Penna	4.0 L Ford Intech HP I6	16	
DNF	S	4	Clayton Haynes	Clayton Haynes; Anton Mechtler	Toyota MR2 GT	15	
DNF	S	4	Clayton Haynes	Clayton Haynes; Anton Mechtler	2.0 L Toyota 3S-GE I4	15	
DNF	S	54	Rebound Clothing	Len Cave; Megan Kirkham; Phil Kirkham	Mazda MX-5	2	
DNF	S	54	Rebound Clothing	Len Cave; Megan Kirkham; Phil Kirkham	1.8 L Mazda BP I4	2	
DNF	E	37	Nathan Thomas	Glen Jorden; Nathan Thomas	Suzuki Swift GTi	2	
DNF	E	37	Nathan Thomas	Glen Jorden; Nathan Thomas	1.3 L Suzuki G13B I4	2	
DNF	A	9	Wagon Wheels Chrysler Jeep	Craig Dean; Rod Salmon; Damien White	Dodge Viper GTS	2	
DNF	A	9	Wagon Wheels Chrysler Jeep	Craig Dean; Rod Salmon; Damien White	8.0 L Chrysler Viper SR V10	2	
DNF	A	23	Bruce Lynton	Beric Lynton; Michael Simpson	BMW M3-R	1	
DNF	A	23	Bruce Lynton	Beric Lynton; Michael Simpson	3.0 L BMW S50 I6	1	
DNF	B	99	Garry Holt	Dean Canto; Garry Holt; Chris Stannard	Subaru Impreza WRX	1	
DNF	B	99	Garry Holt	Dean Canto; Garry Holt; Chris Stannard	2.0 L Subaru EJ turbocharged H4	1	
DNS	A	29	Garry Waldon	John Bowe; Garry Waldon	Dodge Viper GTS		
DNS	A	29	Garry Waldon	John Bowe; Garry Waldon	8.0 L Chrysler Viper SR V10		
DNS	A	30	Marino Ciuffptelli	Matthew Coleman; Paula Elstrek	Maserati Ghibli		
DNS	A	30	Marino Ciuffptelli	Matthew Coleman; Paula Elstrek	2.0 L Maserati AM577 twin-turbocharged V6		
DNS	E	74	Buy-A-Drive	John Falk; Kevin Lusty	Suzuki Swift GTi		
DNS	E	74	Buy-A-Drive	John Falk; Kevin Lusty	1.3 L Suzuki G13B I4		
DNQ	E	65	Crossover Car Conversions	Craig Dean; Trevor Sheumack	Saleen S351 Mustang		
DNQ	E	65	Crossover Car Conversions	Craig Dean; Trevor Sheumack	5.8 L Ford Windsor supercharged V8		
