= 1998 Century Batteries Three Hour Bathurst Showroom Showdown =

Seasons
- ← 1997 1999 →

Layout of the Mount Panorama Circuit

The 1998 Century Batteries Three Hour Bathurst Showroom Showdown was an endurance motor race for GT Production Cars. The race was staged at the Mount Panorama Circuit, near Bathurst, in New South Wales, Australia on 14 November 1998 and was won by Peter Fitzgerald and Jim Richards driving a Porsche 911 RSCS.

== Classes ==
Cars competed in six classes.

- Class A: Supercars
- Class B: High Performance Cars
- Class C: Production Cars (Over 2500cc)
- Class D: Production Cars (1851 to 2500cc)
- Class E: Production Cars (Up to 1850cc)
- Class S: GTP Sports

== Results ==
Pos.	Class	No.	Team / Entrant	Drivers	Car	Laps	Time/Retired
Pos.	Class	No.	Team / Entrant	Drivers	Engine	Laps	Time/Retired
1	A	9	Falken Tyres	Peter Fitzgerald; Jim Richards	Porsche 993 RSCS	69	3:01:44.6934
1	A	9	Falken Tyres	Peter Fitzgerald; Jim Richards	3.8 L Porsche M64 H6	69	3:01:44.6934
2	A	27	Ross Palmer Motorsport	Neil Crompton; Darren Palmer	Ferrari F355 Challenge	69	+0.288
2	A	27	Ross Palmer Motorsport	Neil Crompton; Darren Palmer	3.5 L Ferrari Tipo F129B V8	69	+0.288
3	A	8	Ed Aitken	Ed Aitken; Kevin Weeks	Porsche 993 RSCS	69	+1:17.998
3	A	8	Ed Aitken	Ed Aitken; Kevin Weeks	3.8 L Porsche M64 H6	69	+1:17.998
4	A	1	Beninca Motors	Domenic Beninca; Trevor Sheumack	Porsche 993 RSCS	69	+1:27.198
4	A	1	Beninca Motors	Domenic Beninca; Trevor Sheumack	3.8 L Porsche M64 H6	69	+1:27.198
5	A	64	Supercheap Auto	Rod Dawson; Bob Thorn	Toyota Supra RZ Twin Turbo	65	+4 laps
5	A	64	Supercheap Auto	Rod Dawson; Bob Thorn	3.0 L Toyota 2JZ-GTE twin-turbo I6	65	+4 laps
6	A	17	Ross Almond	Fred Gentile; Ross Halliday	Mitsubishi Lancer RS-E Evolution V	65	+4 laps
6	A	17	Ross Almond	Fred Gentile; Ross Halliday	2.0 L Mitsubishi Sirius 4G63 turbocharged I4	65	+4 laps
7	A	26	Ross Almond	Ross Almond; Trevor John	Mitsubishi Lancer RS-E Evolution V	64	+5 laps
7	A	26	Ross Almond	Ross Almond; Trevor John	2.0 L Mitsubishi Sirius 4G63 turbocharged I4	64	+5 laps
8	B	34	Mark King	Mark King; Rod Wilson	Mitsubishi Lancer RS-E Evolution III	64	+5 laps
8	B	34	Mark King	Mark King; Rod Wilson	2.0 L Mitsubishi Sirius 4G63 turbocharged I4	64	+5 laps
9	B	7	Peter Boylan	Damien White; Jim Zerefos	Subaru Impreza WRX	64	+5 laps
9	B	7	Peter Boylan	Damien White; Jim Zerefos	2.0 L Subaru EJ turbocharged H4	64	+5 laps
10	B	2	John Cowley	John Cowley; Wayne Park	HSV VS GTS-R	64	+5 laps
10	B	2	John Cowley	John Cowley; Wayne Park	5.7 L HSV 215i V8	64	+5 laps
11	B	84	Peter Boylan	Peter Boylan; Ross Palmer	Subaru Impreza WRX	63	+6 laps
11	B	84	Peter Boylan	Peter Boylan; Ross Palmer	2.0 L Subaru EJ turbocharged H4	63	+6 laps
12	B	6	Nepean EFI	Chris Koursparis; Anthony Wilson	Subaru Impreza WRX	63	+6 laps
12	B	6	Nepean EFI	Chris Koursparis; Anthony Wilson	2.0 L Subaru EJ turbocharged H4	63	+6 laps
13	A	41	Crossover Car Conversions	Craig Dean; Graham Hunt	Toyota Soarer Turbo	63	+6 laps
13	A	41	Crossover Car Conversions	Craig Dean; Graham Hunt	2.5 L Toyota 1JZ-GTE twin-turbocharged I6	63	+6 laps
14	S	32	Bruce Lynton	Beric Lynton; Michael Simpson	BMW 323i	62	+7 laps
14	S	32	Bruce Lynton	Beric Lynton; Michael Simpson	2.5 L BMW M52 I6	62	+7 laps
15	S	13	Osborne Motorsport	Colin Osborne; Ric Shaw	Toyota MR2 Bathurst	61	+8 laps
15	S	13	Osborne Motorsport	Colin Osborne; Ric Shaw	2.0 L Toyota 3S-GE I4	61	+8 laps
16	C	88	David Ratcliff	David Ratcliff; Ron Searle	Toyota Camry CSi	61	+8 laps
16	C	88	David Ratcliff	David Ratcliff; Ron Searle	3.0 L Toyota 1MZ-FE V6	61	+8 laps
17	C	20	Robert Chadwick	Robert Chadwick; Jim Myhill	Mitsubishi TE Magna	61	+8 laps
17	C	20	Robert Chadwick	Robert Chadwick; Jim Myhill	3.0 L Mitsubishi Cyclone 6G72 V6	61	+8 laps
18	D	43	Calvin Gardiner	Calvin Gardiner; Tom Watkinson	Mazda 626	61	+8 laps
18	D	43	Calvin Gardiner	Calvin Gardiner; Tom Watkinson	2.5 L Mazda KL-DE V6	61	+8 laps
19	C	29	Ross Palmer Motorsport	Joshua Dowling; Toby Hagon; Wayne Webster	Ford AU Falcon XR6	61	+8 laps
19	C	29	Ross Palmer Motorsport	Joshua Dowling; Toby Hagon; Wayne Webster	4.0 L Ford Intech HP I6	61	+8 laps
20	D	71	Rebound Clothing	Matt Lehmann; Megan Kirkham; Phil Kirkham	Mazda 626	60	+9 laps
20	D	71	Rebound Clothing	Matt Lehmann; Megan Kirkham; Phil Kirkham	2.5 L Mazda KL-DE V6	60	+9 laps
21	B	18	Murray Carter	Murray Carter; Wayne Vinckx	Nissan 200SX Turbo	60	+9 laps
21	B	18	Murray Carter	Murray Carter; Wayne Vinckx	2.0 L Nissan SR20DET turbocharged I4	60	+9 laps
22	C	99	Prodrive Racing	Ian McAlister; Robert Porter	Ford EL Falcon XR6	59	+10 laps
22	C	99	Prodrive Racing	Ian McAlister; Robert Porter	4.0 L Ford I6	59	+10 laps
23	E	22	Kosi Kalaitzidis	Kosi Kalaitzidis; Leigh Yarnall	Proton M21 Coupe	59	+10 laps
23	E	22	Kosi Kalaitzidis	Kosi Kalaitzidis; Leigh Yarnall	1.8 L Mitsubishi 4G93 I4	59	+10 laps
24	E	37	Nathan Thomas	Glen Jorden; Nathan Thomas	Suzuki Swift GTi	59	+10 laps
24	E	37	Nathan Thomas	Glen Jorden; Nathan Thomas	1.3 L Suzuki G13B I4	59	+10 laps
25	C	16	Peter Phelan	Peter Phelan; Trevor Talbot	Holden VT Commodore SS	58	+11 laps
25	C	16	Peter Phelan	Peter Phelan; Trevor Talbot	5.0 L Holden 5000i V8	58	+11 laps
26	E	75	Aaron McGill	Aaron McGill; Don Pulver	Suzuki Swift GTi	58	+11 laps
26	E	75	Aaron McGill	Aaron McGill; Don Pulver	1.3 L Suzuki G13B I4	58	+11 laps
27	D	31	Ken Talbert	Ken Talbert; Kimley Talbert	Mazda 626	58	+11 laps
27	D	31	Ken Talbert	Ken Talbert; Kimley Talbert	2.5 L Mazda KL-DE V6	58	+11 laps
28	E	76	Aaron Lewis	Sue Hughes; Jason Veltruski	Suzuki Swift GTi	54	+15 laps
28	E	76	Aaron Lewis	Sue Hughes; Jason Veltruski	1.3 L Suzuki G13B I4	54	+15 laps
DNF	C	36	David Bruce	David Bruce; John McIlroy	Ford AU Falcon XR8	58	
DNF	C	36	David Bruce	David Bruce; John McIlroy	5.0 L Ford Windsor V8	58	
NC	C	55	Mark Cohen	Mark Cohen; Martin Miller	Holden VS Commodore SS	49	+20 laps
NC	C	55	Mark Cohen	Mark Cohen; Martin Miller	5.0 L Holden 5000i V8	49	+20 laps
DNF	B	51	Scott Jacob	Scott Jacob; Grant Kenny	Subaru Impreza WRX	48	
DNF	B	51	Scott Jacob	Scott Jacob; Grant Kenny	2.0 L Subaru EJ turbocharged H4	48	
NC	E	78	Darren Best	Darren Best; Martin Doxey	Hyundai Excel Sprint	47	+22 laps
NC	E	78	Darren Best	Darren Best; Martin Doxey	1.5 L Hyundai G4EK I4	47	+22 laps
DNF	S	4	Hard Toys Racing	Clayton Haynes; Nigel Stones	Toyota MR2 GT	46	
DNF	S	4	Hard Toys Racing	Clayton Haynes; Nigel Stones	2.0 L Toyota 3S-GE I4	46	
DNF	C	19	Ross Palmer Motorsport	Tim Leahey; Steve Winwood	Ford EL Falcon XR8	34	
DNF	C	19	Ross Palmer Motorsport	Tim Leahey; Steve Winwood	4.9 L Ford Windsor V8	34	
DNF	E	80	Wayne Murphy	Bruce Constable; Wayne Murphy	Suzuki Swift GTi	31	
DNF	E	80	Wayne Murphy	Bruce Constable; Wayne Murphy	1.3 L Suzuki G13B I4	31	
DNF	B	61	Spies Hecker	Geof Fickling; Peter Gazzard; Trevor Haines	Subaru Impreza WRX	29	
DNF	B	61	Spies Hecker	Geof Fickling; Peter Gazzard; Trevor Haines	2.0 L Subaru EJ turbocharged H4	29	
DNF	C	21	Robert Chadwick	Robert Chadwick; Jim Myhill	Mitsubishi TE Magna	29	
DNF	C	21	Robert Chadwick	Robert Chadwick; Jim Myhill	3.0 L Mitsubishi Cyclone 6G72 V6	29	
DNF	B	44	Edge Motorsport	Dean Canto; Paul Dumbrell	Subaru Impreza WRX	19	
DNF	B	44	Edge Motorsport	Dean Canto; Paul Dumbrell	2.0 L Subaru EJ turbocharged H4	19	
DNF	B	14	Clyde Lawrence	Clyde Lawrence; Steve Russell-Clarke; Graham Smith	Subaru Impreza WRX	19	
DNF	B	14	Clyde Lawrence	Clyde Lawrence; Steve Russell-Clarke; Graham Smith	2.0 L Subaru EJ turbocharged H4	19	
DNF	E	98	Paul Steer	Brian Callaghan Jr. Nigel Williams	Suzuki Swift GTi	17	
DNF	E	98	Paul Steer	Brian Callaghan Jr. Nigel Williams	1.3 L Suzuki G13B I4	17	
DNF	A	11	Car Imports Australia	Jamie Cartwright; Christian D'Agostin	Toyota Supra RZ Twin Turbo	14	
DNF	A	11	Car Imports Australia	Jamie Cartwright; Christian D'Agostin	3.0 L Toyota 2JZ-GTE twin-turbo I6	14	
DNF	A	5	Garry Waldon	Neal Bates; Garry Waldon	Dodge Viper GTS Coupe	13	
DNF	A	5	Garry Waldon	Neal Bates; Garry Waldon	8.0 L Chrysler Viper SR V10	13	
DNF	A	3	Ipex Racing Team	Matthew Coleman; Alfredo Costanzo	Maserati Ghilbi Open Cup	10	
DNF	A	3	Ipex Racing Team	Matthew Coleman; Alfredo Costanzo	2.0 L Maserati AM577 twin-turbocharged V6	10	
DNF	C	28	Ross Palmer Motorsport	Guy Andrews; Sam Newman	Ford AU Falcon XR6	10	
DNF	C	28	Ross Palmer Motorsport	Guy Andrews; Sam Newman	4.0 L Ford Intech HP I6	10	
DNF	B	25	Richard Davis	Gary Baxter; Richard Davis	HSV VS GTS-R	4	
DNF	B	25	Richard Davis	Gary Baxter; Richard Davis	5.7 L HSV 215i V8	4	
DNF	A	12	Terry Bosnjak	Terry Bosnjak; Tomas Mezera	Mazda RX-7 SP Turbo	3	
DNF	A	12	Terry Bosnjak	Terry Bosnjak; Tomas Mezera	1.3 L Mazda 13B-REW twin-turbocharged twin-rotor	3	
DNF	B	91	James McKnoulty	Gary Deane; Craig Harris	Subaru Impreza WRX	3	
DNF	B	91	James McKnoulty	Gary Deane; Craig Harris	2.0 L Subaru EJ turbocharged H4	3	
DNS	A	45	Statewide GT-R Racing	Paul Morris; John Teulan	Nissan Skyline GT-R		
DNS	A	45	Statewide GT-R Racing	Paul Morris; John Teulan	2.6 L Nissan RB26DETT twin-turbocharged I6		
DNS	B	47	Daily Planet	John Trimbole; Wayne Wakefield	Mitsubishi Lancer RS-E Evolution III		
DNS	B	47	Daily Planet	John Trimbole; Wayne Wakefield	2.0 L Mitsubishi Sirius 4G63 turbocharged I4		
DNS	S	35	Osborne Motorsport	Richard Porter; Daniel Wilkie	Toyota MR2 Bathurst		
DNS	S	35	Osborne Motorsport	Richard Porter; Daniel Wilkie	2.0 L Toyota 3S-GE I4		
