= Ford straight-six engine =

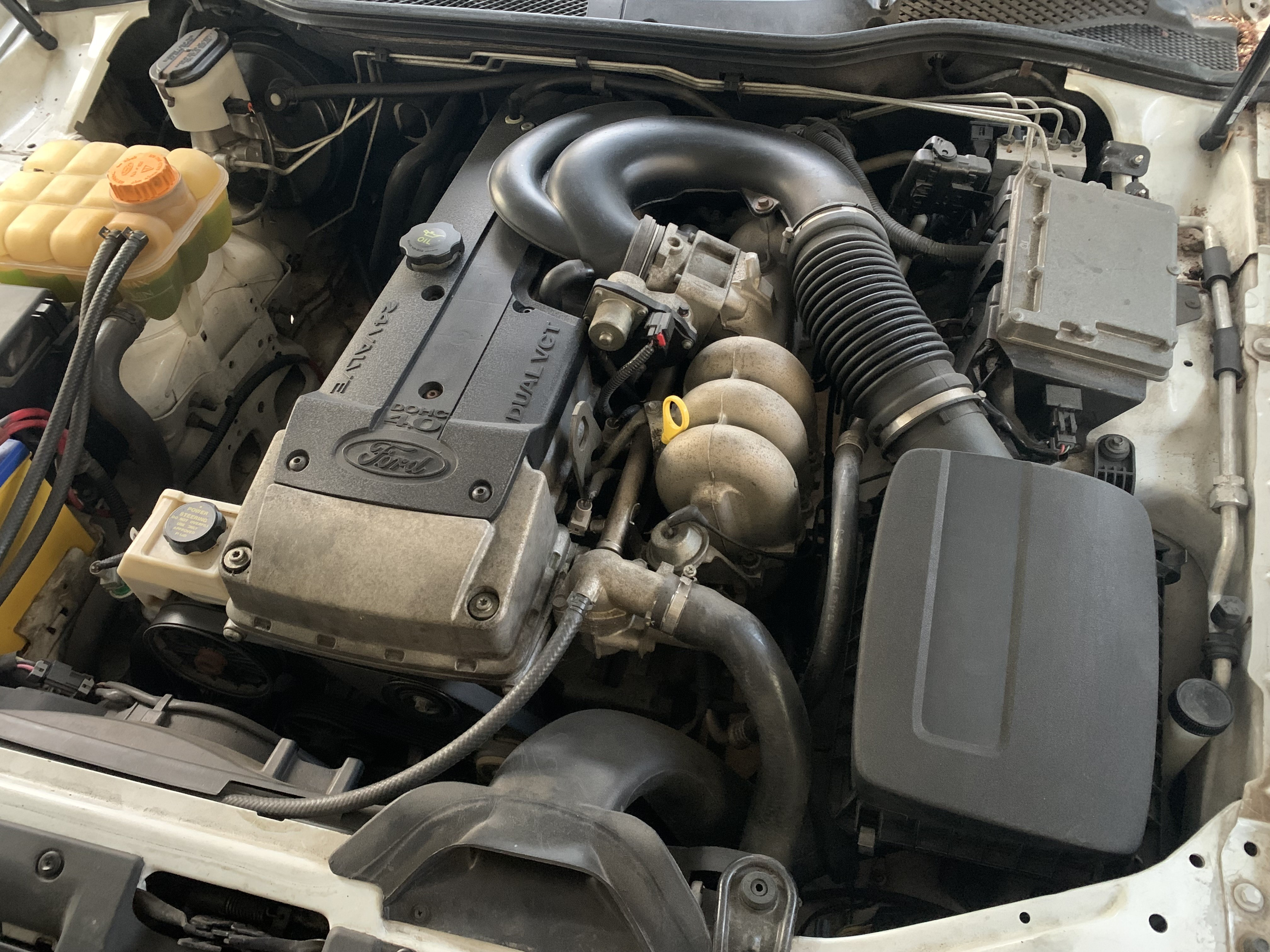
- Ford Barra 190 straight-six engine, a direct evolution of the 1960 Falcon straight six.

Overview
- Manufacturer: Ford Motor Company
- Production: 1941–1996 (US); 1960–2016 (Australia); 1961–1995 (Argentina)

Layout
- Configuration: Straight-6
- Cylinder block material: Cast iron
- Cylinder head material: Cast iron, aluminium
- Valvetrain: Sidevalve (1941-1951); OHV (1952-1996); SOHC (Australia, 1988-2002); DOHC (Australia, 2002-2016)

Combustion
- Turbocharger: Garrett GT3582/GT3576 with intercooler (Australia, 2002-2016)
- Fuel system: Carburetor (1941-1993); CFI (1988-1992); MPFI (1982-2016)
- Management: Ford EEC-IV/EEC-V; Bosch LE II Jetronic
- Fuel type: Gasoline
- Cooling system: Water-cooled

The Ford Motor Company produced straight-six engines from 1906 until 1908 and from 1941 until 2016. In 1906, the first Ford straight-six was introduced in the Model K. The next was introduced in the 1941 Ford. Ford continued producing straight-six engines for use in its North American vehicles until 1996, when they were discontinued in favor of more compact V6 designs.

Ford Australia also manufactured straight-six engines in Australia for the Falcon and Territory models until 2016, when both vehicle lines were discontinued. Following the closure of the Australian engine plant, Ford no longer produces a straight-six gasoline engine.

== First generation ==
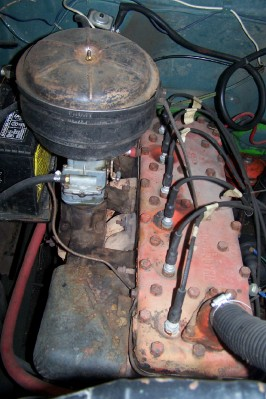
The H series flathead six cylinder engine.

The first-generation Ford six-cylinder engines were all flatheads. They were the G- and H-series engines of 226 cu in (3.7 L) used in cars and trucks and the M-series of 254 cu in (4.2 L) used in larger Ford trucks and for industrial applications.

=== 226 ===
Introduced for the 1941 model year, the first Ford L-6 (designated G-series) displaced 226 cu in (3.7 L) and produced 90 hp (67 kW), the same as the Flathead V-8 that year. Like the V-8, it was also a flathead or L-head engine. In 1948, Ford raised the compression of the flathead six or L-6 (designated H-series or Rouge 226) so that it generated 95 hp (71 kW) and 180 lb⋅ft (244 N⋅m) of torque. The G- and H-series engines were used in the full-sized Ford cars and trucks to replace the smaller 136 cu in (2.2 L) Flathead V8 that was used in the 1937 Ford. Ford discontinued production of the H-series engine for the 1951 model year.

=== 254 ===
A 254 cu in (4.2 L) version of the L-6 (designated the M-series or Rouge 254) was used from 1950 to 1953 in F6-series Ford trucks (COE, dump, truck-tractor, etc.), and small Ford school buses. The M-series engine produced 115 hp (86 kW) and 212 lb⋅ft (287 N⋅m) of torque. They were also used in miscellaneous industrial applications, e.g., to power water pumps for irrigation purposes and within vineyards to manage risk by powering giant frost-control propellers on stands in the middle of rows of grapes.

== Second generation ==
Mileage Maker/Cost Clipper
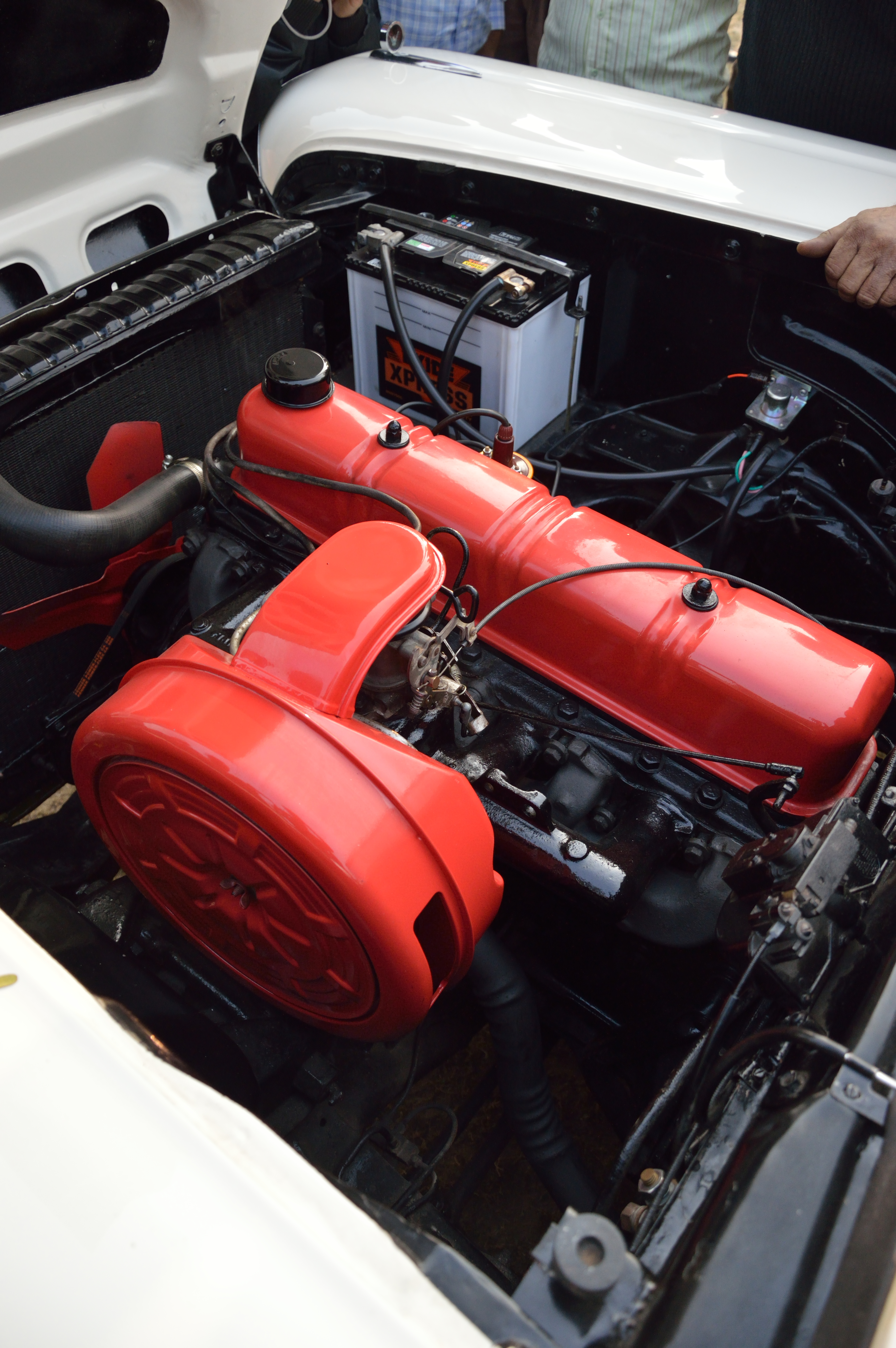
- The 223 cu in version in a 1959 Ford Fairlane

Overview
- Production: 1952–1964

Layout
- Displacement: 215 cu in (3,523 cc); 223 cu in (3,653 cc); 262 cu in (4,301 cc)
- Cylinder bore: 3.56 in (90.4 mm) (215); 3.625 in (92.1 mm) (223); 3.718 in (94.4 mm) (262)
- Piston stroke: 3.6 in (91.4 mm) (215 and 223); 4.03 in (102.4 mm) (262)

Output
- Power output: 215: 101 hp (75 kW); 223: 115 to 145 hp (86 to 108 kW); 262: 152 hp (113 kW)

The second generation was a newly designed inline-six, produced from 1952 through 1964; it shared many parts with Ford Y-blocks such as the entire valve train and the problems associated with the Y-block's lubrication system. These engines have the exhaust and intake on the driver's side and the distributor on the passenger side. It is referred to as Mileage Maker or I-Block Mileage Maker (with the "I" referring to "inline") in the passenger cars and Cost Clipper in the trucks.

=== 215 ===
A completely new OHV I-6 was offered for the 1952–53 F-Series. It displaced 215 cu in (3.5 L) and produced 101 hp (75 kW). It was also used in the 1952–53 Ford full-sized cars.

=== 223 ===
The 215 grew to 223 cu in (3.7 L) for the 1954 F-Series. Output was now 115 hp (86 kW) in the trucks and 120 hp (89 kW) in the 1954 Ford cars. Power was up to 137 hp (102 kW) in the 1956 trucks. While not the popular engine option, the 223 was the only inline-six offered in the Fairlane (until 1961), Galaxie, and F-Series trucks between 1955 and 1964, causing it to be not quite a rarity, but not easy to come across. The 223 was also used in 1963–1964 Ford trucks, which also used the Autolite 1100 carburetor with stamping C4TF-E and produced 145 hp (108 kW) with 206 ft-lb of torque, and Mercury Meteor-Monterey in 1961. The 223 was also used in Onan 30EC generator sets and possibly others.

=== 262 ===
A 262 cu in (4.3 L) I-6 version was also produced. The 262 I-6 was built from 1961 to 1964 for use in medium- and heavy-duty Ford trucks. This engine was also used for industrial applications.

== Third generation ==
The third generation was produced at the Lima Engine plant in Lima, Ohio, from 1960 through 1984. Officially dubbed the Thriftpower Six, this engine line is sometimes referred to as the Falcon Six.

=== 144 ===
144 Thriftpower Six
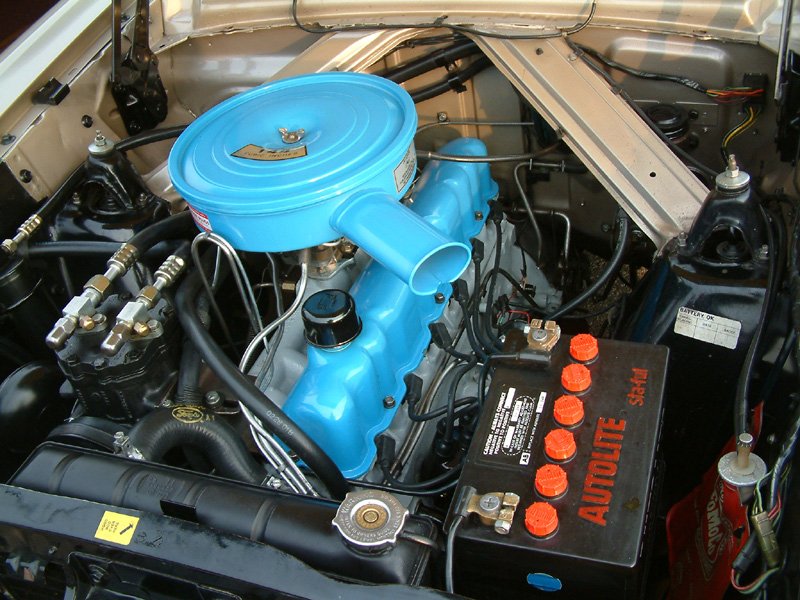

Overview
- Production: 1960–1964

Layout
- Displacement: 144.3 cu in (2.4 L; 2,365 cc)
- Cylinder bore: 3.5 in (88.9 mm)
- Piston stroke: 2.5 in (63.5 mm)
- Cylinder block material: Cast iron
- Cylinder head material: Cast iron
- Valvetrain: OHV
- Compression ratio: 8.7:1

Combustion
- Fuel system: Carburetor
- Fuel type: Leaded gasoline
- Oil system: Wet sump
- Cooling system: Water-cooled

Output
- Power output: 84 hp (63 kW) at 4200 rpm
- Torque output: 134 lb⋅ft (182 N⋅m) at 2000 rpm

The 144 cu in (2.4 L) inline-six engine was first introduced in the 1960 Ford Falcon. The 144 was made from 1960 through 1964 and averaged 90 hp (67 kW) during the production run. While not known for being powerful or a stout engine, it proved to be economical and could get fairly good gas mileage for the time, up to 30 mpg_{‑US} (8 L/100 km). This small six was the basis for all the Ford "Falcon" straight-six engines. The intake manifold on this series was cast integrally with the cylinder head (this design was also used by Chevrolet with some of their later third-generation inline-sixes, the older engines had separate manifolds); as a result, they could not be easily modified for greater power. This engine had four main bearings and can be identified by the three core plugs on the side of the block.

This engine was used in:

- 1960–1964 Ford Falcon
- 1960–1964 Ford Ranchero
- 1960–1964 Mercury Comet
- 1961–1964 Ford E-Series (Econoline)

=== 170 ===
170 Special Six
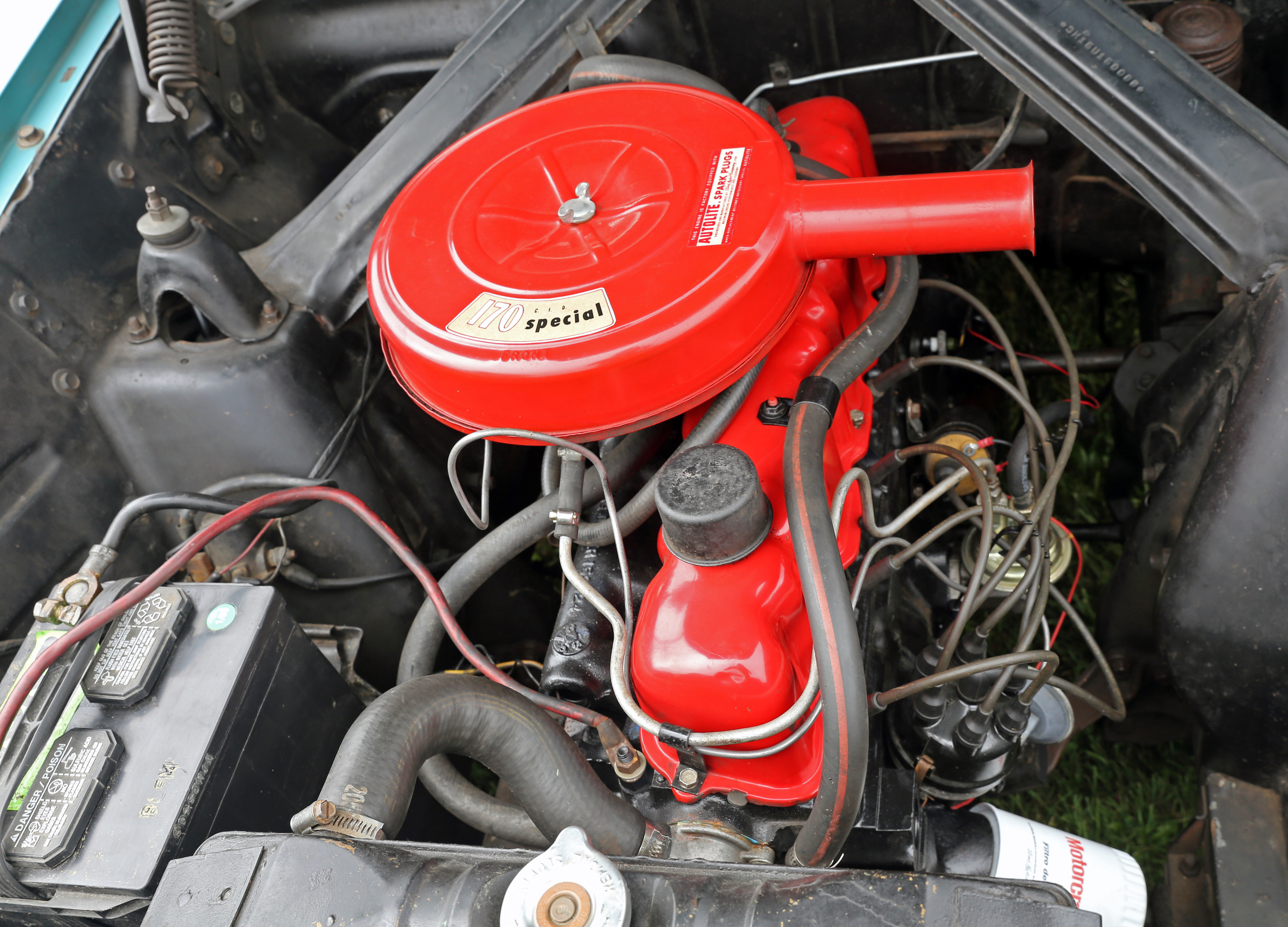

Overview
- Production: 1961–1972

Layout
- Displacement: 169.7 cu in (2.8 L; 2,781 cc)
- Cylinder bore: 3.5 in (88.9 mm)
- Piston stroke: 2.94 in (74.7 mm)
- Compression ratio: 9.1:1

Output
- Power output: 105 hp (78 kW) at 4400 rpm
- Torque output: 156 lb⋅ft (212 N⋅m) at 2400 rpm

In 1961, the 170 cu in (2.8 L) became an option for the Falcon and Comet lines. The 170 Special Six was a stroked version of the 144, increasing the stroke from 2.5 to 2.94 in (63.5 to 74.7 mm). The original 1965 Ford Mustang used a 101 hp (75 kW) version from March (production start) through July 1964. The Econoline van and Ford Bronco received a heavier-duty version with mechanical valve lifters. This engine had four main bearings and can be identified by the three core plugs on the side of the block. The 170 Special was dropped from production in 1972.

As used in the Argentinian-made Ford Falcon from 1962 until 1970, this engine produced 96 hp (72 kW) at 4400 rpm.

=== 187 ===
From 1965 to 1969, Ford Argentina produced a specific 186.7 cu in (3.1 L; 3,060 cc) block similar to the earlier 200 cu in (3.3 L), with four main bearings and a 3.126 in (79.4 mm) stroke) but with a 3.56 in (90.4 mm) bore. It was replaced by the 188 cu in (3.1 L) from 1969. Power was rated at 116 hp (87 kW).

=== 200 ===
The 200.0 cu in (3.3 L; 3,278 cc) inline-six model was introduced in the middle of 1963 with 3.685 by 3.126 in (93.6 by 79.4 mm) bore and stroke, and shared the four main bearing design of the 170. Early 200s can be identified by three core plugs. Beginning in 1965, the 200s were upgraded to seven main bearings to reduce harmonic vibrations and increase durability. The 1965 and later engines can be identified by four core plugs and the casting code C5DE-H. The 1965 Mustang (August 1964 onward) used this engine as standard, rated at 120 hp (89 kW). The Mustang continued to use the 200 as its base engine until it was dropped in 1971. Starting in 1966, a six-bolt bellhousing flange block was introduced. Beginning in 1980, one version of the 200 block was redesigned with a bell housing flange and a low-mount starter very similar to the low-mount starter 250 inline-six. This version is easily identified by starter location down by the oil pan rail and is referred to as the Big Bell 200. The big bell design is uncommon, but sought after by I-6 performance enthusiasts because it can be modified to accept a Ford small block V8 six bolt bell housing. There were concurrent high-mount starter 200 blocks made till 1983 model year, and they are more common than low-mount starter 200s.

When Ford launched the third-generation Fox body Mustang in 1979, the original engine lineup included the Cologne V6. The same engine was also offered in the hugely successful Ford of Europe Capri Mk II. The 2.8 L V6 engine was a popular option for the US Mustang and the European Capri Mk II, and as a result, the Cologne engine plant could not meet the demand for engines for both continents. As a result, the Cologne 2.8 L V6 was dropped from the Mustang's engine lineup in the middle of the 1979 production year and replaced with the 200 Falcon inline-six, which was then referred to as the 3.3 L engine. The engine and front suspension K-member were transferred from the Fairmont, which helped reduce costs instead of having to redesign the Mustang for a different engine.

The 200 was used in the Ford Maverick and Mercury Comet and continued in the Ford Fairmont and Mercury Zephyr until they were discontinued at the end of the 1983 model year. The 1975–80 Ford Granada and Mercury Monarch offered the 200 inline-six as the standard engine. For 1981–82 the Ford Granada was redesigned and common with an expanded line of Mercury Cougars which used the 200 inline-six as the standard engine. From mid-year 1980 through 1982 the Ford Thunderbird and Mercury Cougar XR-7 used the 200 inline-six as the standard engine. The Ford LTD and Mercury Marquis, introduced in 1983 as the successors to the Granada and Cougar (non-XR7 models), carried over the 200 engine until it was replaced by the 3.8L Essex V6 for 1984.

Ford was also having problems meeting demand for its 2.3 L OHC engine, which was used in a multitude of models worldwide. In anticipation of another engine shortage, the Ford engine plant in Lima, Ohio, which was already producing the 2.3-liter OHC engine, decided they could modify the Falcon inline six block casting molds to remove cylinders 4 and 5 to create a four-cylinder engine. A cast-iron high-swirl cylinder head was developed, and the new 2.3 L engine was designated the HSC to differentiate it from the same displacement 2.3 L OHC design. This engine shared many common parts with the 200, and it is common for persons rebuilding their 200 engines to use the 2.3 L HSC pistons as a cheap replacement.

Applications:

- 1963–1967 Ford Ranchero
- 1963–1969 Ford Fairlane (Americas)
- 1964–1970 Ford Falcon (North America)
- 1965–1971 and 1979–1982 Ford Mustang
- 1968–1969 Ford Torino
- 1970–1977 Ford Maverick (Americas)
- 1975–1982 Ford Granada (North America)
- 1978–1983 Ford Fairmont
- 1973–1977 Ford Bronco
- 1980–1982 Ford Thunderbird (eighth generation)
- 1983 Ford LTD (Americas)
- 1964–1967 and 1971–1977 Mercury Comet
- 1975–1980 Mercury Monarch
- 1978–1983 Mercury Zephyr
- 1979–1982 Mercury Capri
- 1980–1982 Mercury Cougar
- 1983 Mercury Marquis

=== 250 ===
The 250 cu in (4.1 L) inline-six engine was offered in 1969 in the Mustang, and 1970 in compact Ford cars (Maverick). The 250 was a stroked 200, made by increasing the stroke from 3.126 to 3.91 in (79.4 to 99.3 mm). Output was 155 hp (116 kW) in the Mustang, and the 250 became the base engine in 1971. The Ford Granada and Mercury Monarch offered the 250 inline-six for the 1975–1980 model years, when it was replaced by the 200 inline-six.

Power was re-evaluated at 98 hp (73 kW) for 1972 (because of power rating changes) and 88 hp (66 kW) the next year. This engine had seven main bearings, and can be identified by the five core plugs on the side of the block. The block uses a low-mount starter and six bellhousing bolts, sharing its bellhousing pattern with the 302 and 351 Windsor V8s, late (1965–68) 289, early 4.6 L V8, and the 240 and 300 inline-six. Production of the 250 ended in 1980.

Applications:

- 1968–1976 Ford Ranchero
- 1968–1973 Ford Torino
- 1969–1973 Ford Mustang
- 1970–1977 Fod Maverick
- 1975–1980 Ford Granada (North America)
- 1968–1969 Mercury Comet
- 1972–1976 Mercury Montego
- 1975–1980 Mercury Monarch

== Fourth generation ==
Truck Six
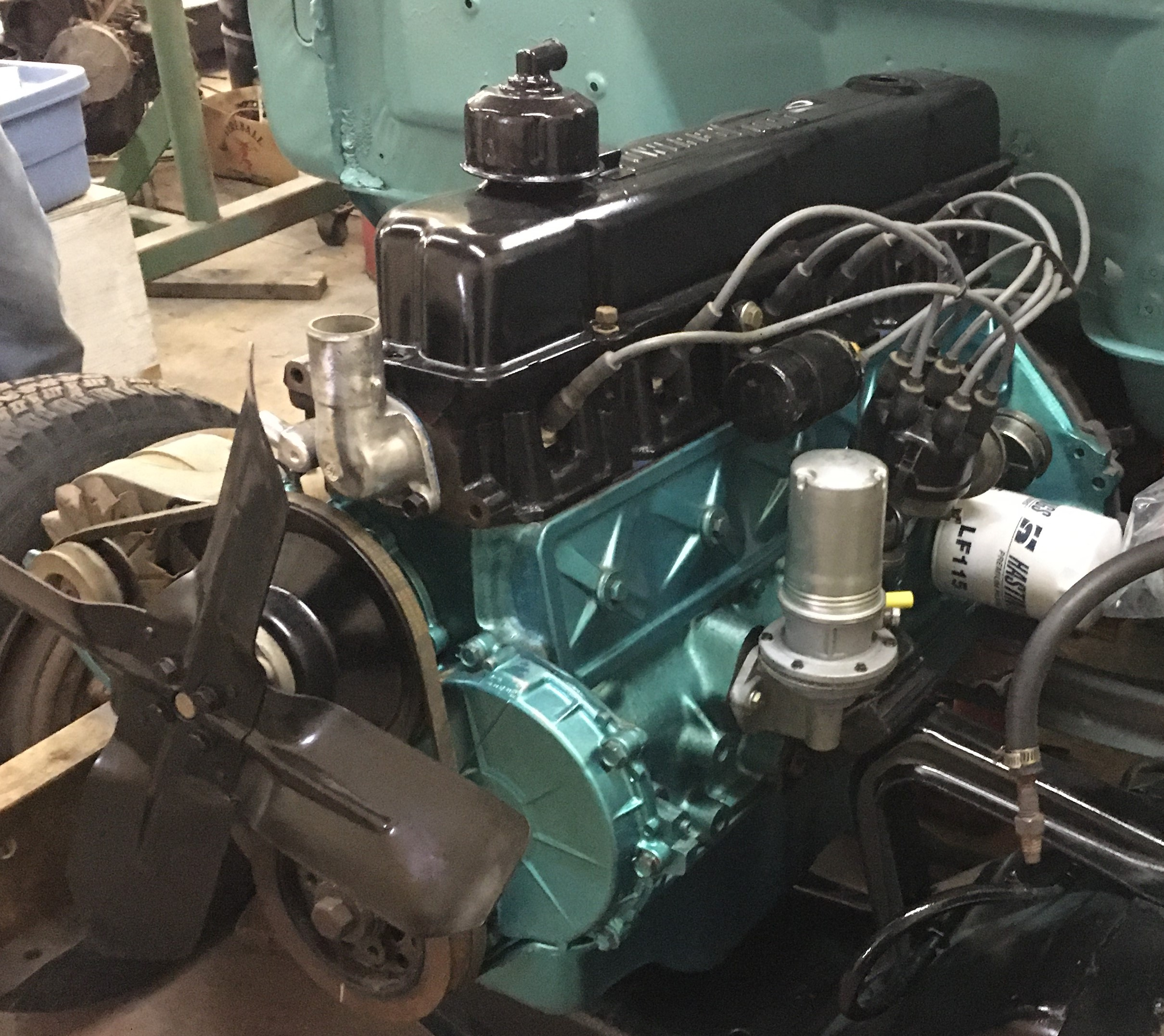
- A 240 Six intended for a 1969 F-100

Overview
- Production: 1965-1996

Layout
- Displacement: 239.8 cu in (3.9 L; 3,929 cc); 300.1 cu in (4.9 L; 4,918 cc)
- Cylinder bore: 4 in (101.6 mm)
- Piston stroke: 3.18 in (80.8 mm) (240); 3.98 in (101.1 mm) (300)

Combustion
- Fuel system: Carburetor (240, 1964-1986 300; MPFI (1987-1996 300)

Output
- Power output: 114 hp (85 kW) to 150 hp (112 kW)
- Torque output: 260 lb⋅ft (353 N⋅m)

Produced at the Cleveland Engine plant in Brook Park, Ohio, from 1965 through 1996, the 240 and 300 inline-six engines are well known for their durability. These engines employed seven main bearings and used long-wearing timing gears instead of a chain or belt.

Both the 240 and the 300, no matter the application, used a single-barrel Autolite 1100/1101 (or Carter YF/A) carburetor until the introduction of electronic fuel injection in 1987. With proper gearing, many F-Series trucks and Broncos achieve 20 mpg_{‑US} (12 l/100 km). This fact was heavily used by Ford's advertising campaign (some television advertisements and written literature even claimed 30 mpg_{‑US} (8 l/100 km)), since the V8 engines in these trucks rarely achieved over 14 mpg_{‑US} (17 L/100 km).

The fuel economy of the 300 makes the engine a popular choice among truck enthusiasts that want both power and economy. The addition of performance parts (such as intake and exhaust manifolds with a four-barrel carburetor) place the engine power output near the same levels as the stock "HO" (High Output) version of the optional 351 V8.

=== 240 ===
The 240 cu in (3.9 L) inline-six for 1965–1972 full-sized cars (continued to 1974 in fleet models) and 1965–1974 trucks and vans produced 150 hp (112 kW) (gross). In stationary service (generators and pumps) fueled by LPG or natural gas, this engine is known as the CSG-639. The 240 had a bore of 4 in (101.6 mm) and a stroke of 3.18 in (80.8 mm).

=== 300 ===
The 300 cu in (4,918 cc) six was first offered in the F-Series for 1965. It is essentially a 240 cu in (3.9 L) with a longer stroke of 3.98 in (101.1 mm). The two engines are nearly identical; the differences are in the rotating assembly and combustion chamber sizes in the head (the heads are interchangeable). It produced 170 hp (127 kW) (gross). The 300 became the base F-Series engine in 1975 at 119 hp (89 kW) (horsepower number changes due to Ford switching to net power ratings in 1972). Power outputs were increased to roughly 122 hp (91 kW) during the early 1980s, before fuel injection was introduced. This became the primary engine of the line, eclipsing the 240. Unlike the Falcon engine, it featured separate intake and exhaust manifolds, which could be easily replaced with aftermarket manifolds offering the promise of even more power, through the installation of larger carburetors and a higher flowing exhaust system.

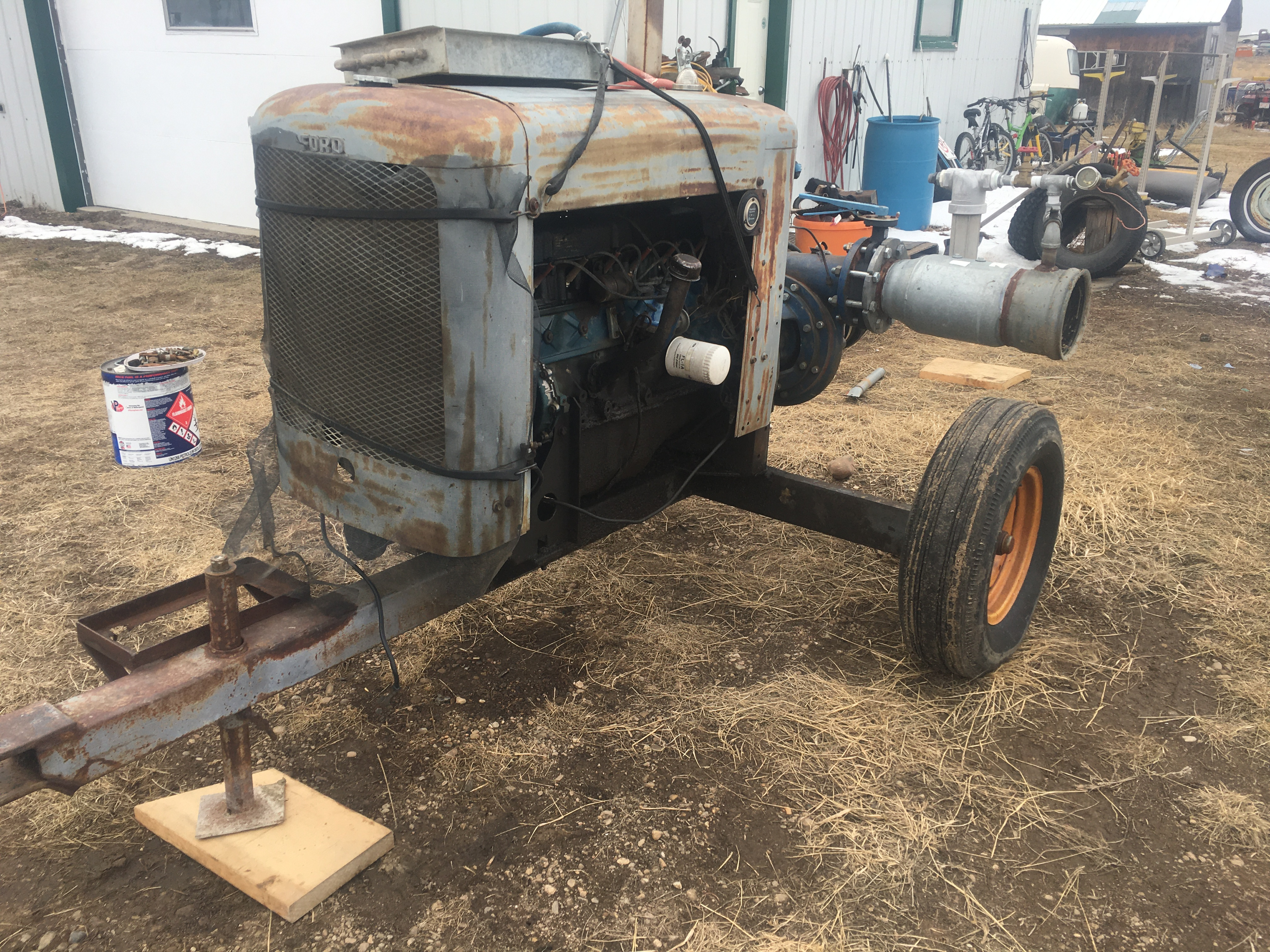
Ford 300 irrigation pump. This one is equipped with extra cooling devices due to the radiators on these units being inadequate to cool the engine in very hot weather

Also during the late 1960s and early 1970s, the 300 was used in larger vehicles such as dump trucks, many weighing into the 15,000 lb (6,804 kg) to 20,000 lb (9,072 kg) range. These engines were equipped with a higher flow HD (Heavy Duty) exhaust manifold and forged crankshafts and rods, as the engines would be constantly working in the 3,000–4,000 rpm range. Due to their high-flowing design, enthusiasts often seek these manifolds out because they allow turbochargers to be easily retrofitted to the engine.

Beginning in 1978, the engine displacement was advertised in metric, becoming "4.9 L." Fuel injection and other changes in 1987 increased output to 150 horsepower (112 kW) with an 8.8:1 compression ratio. Even though this engine was renowned for its durability, low-end torque, and ease of service, it was gradually phased out. Production ended in 1996, making it the last inline-six gasoline engine offered in a Ford car or light truck in North America. It was replaced by the 4.2 L Essex V6 for 1997 in the redesigned F-150, as well as the E-150 and E-250.

The 300 was mated to the Ford C6, E4OD, and AOD automatic transmissions, and the Mazda M5OD, ZF S5-42 5-speed manual transmissions, and the Borg-Warner T18, Tremec RTS, and New Process NP435 4-speed manual transmissions.

Race car driver Scott Donohue raced a rally truck with a Ford 300 inline-six in it and won the Baja 1000 three times. This engine is also used by Stewart & Stevenson in the MA Baggage Tow Tractor, and Harlan in their standard tow tractors, as well as a multitude of other pieces of equipment, such as ski lifts, power generators, wood chippers, tractors, and, until they converted to diesel engines, most UPS trucks. In stationary service (generators and pumps) fueled with LPG or natural gas, this engine is known as the CSG-649.

Applications:

- 1965–1996 Ford F-Series (F-100, F-150, F-250, F-350, and F-600)
- 1968–1996 Ford E-Series (E-100, E-150, E-250, and E-350)
- 1980–1992 Ford Bronco

== Ford Australia ==
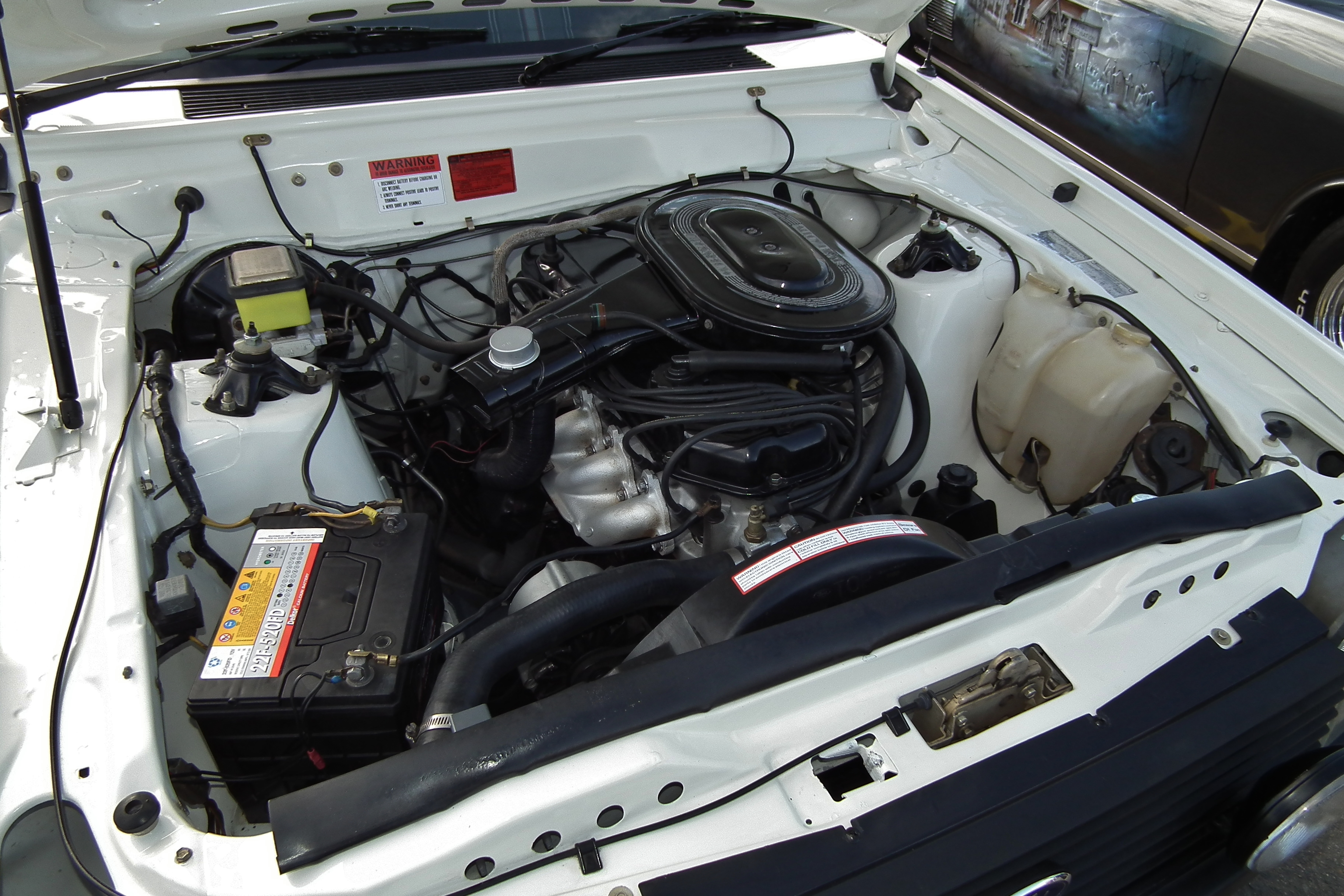
The Australian Ford straight-six as seen in an XD series Ford Falcon, following adoption of a crossflow design in 1976, and an alloy cylinder head in 1980.

With local production of the Ford Falcon starting in 1960, Ford Australia began to offer the same inline-six engines as offered in North America. In Australia, the engine underwent significant updates to its design over the following decades, including a move to a crossflow layout, electronic ignition, alloy cylinder heads, fuel injection, overhead camshaft and later multi-valve double overhead camshaft design, variable intake runners, variable valve timing, and ultimately turbocharging. It remained in production for 56 years, retaining the same bore centres of the original 1960 Falcon engine throughout its evolution.

=== 144, 170, and 200, 3.1 and 3.6 litre ===
Initially, the 90 hp (67 kW) 144 and 101 hp (75 kW) 170 cu in 'Pursuit' engines were offered. The 121 hp (90 kW) 200 cu in 'Super Pursuit' engine option added in February 1964 with the introduction of the XM Falcon, at which time the 144 and 170 underwent changes to cylinder head, camshaft and exhaust design that increased their outputs to 96 hp (72 kW) and 111 hp (83 kW) respectively. In 1965, all three engines received a revised camshaft for increased low-speed performance with the introduction of the XP Falcon. The 144 remained in production until the late 1966 introduction of the larger, second generation XR Falcon.

In 1968, coinciding with the release of the XT Falcon, the deck height of the design was increased to make room for increased crankshaft stroke, resulting in displacements of 188 and 221 cu in (badged 3.1 and 3.6 litres). These engines featured a seven-bearing crankshaft and shared a common 3.68 in (93.5 mm) bore, with strokes of 2.94 or 3.46 in (74.7 or 87.9 mm) respectively. They superseded the 170 and 200 engines in the Australian Falcon lineup. The 188 and 221 also powered the Argentine Falcon range from 1970 to 1991.

=== 200 and 250 ===
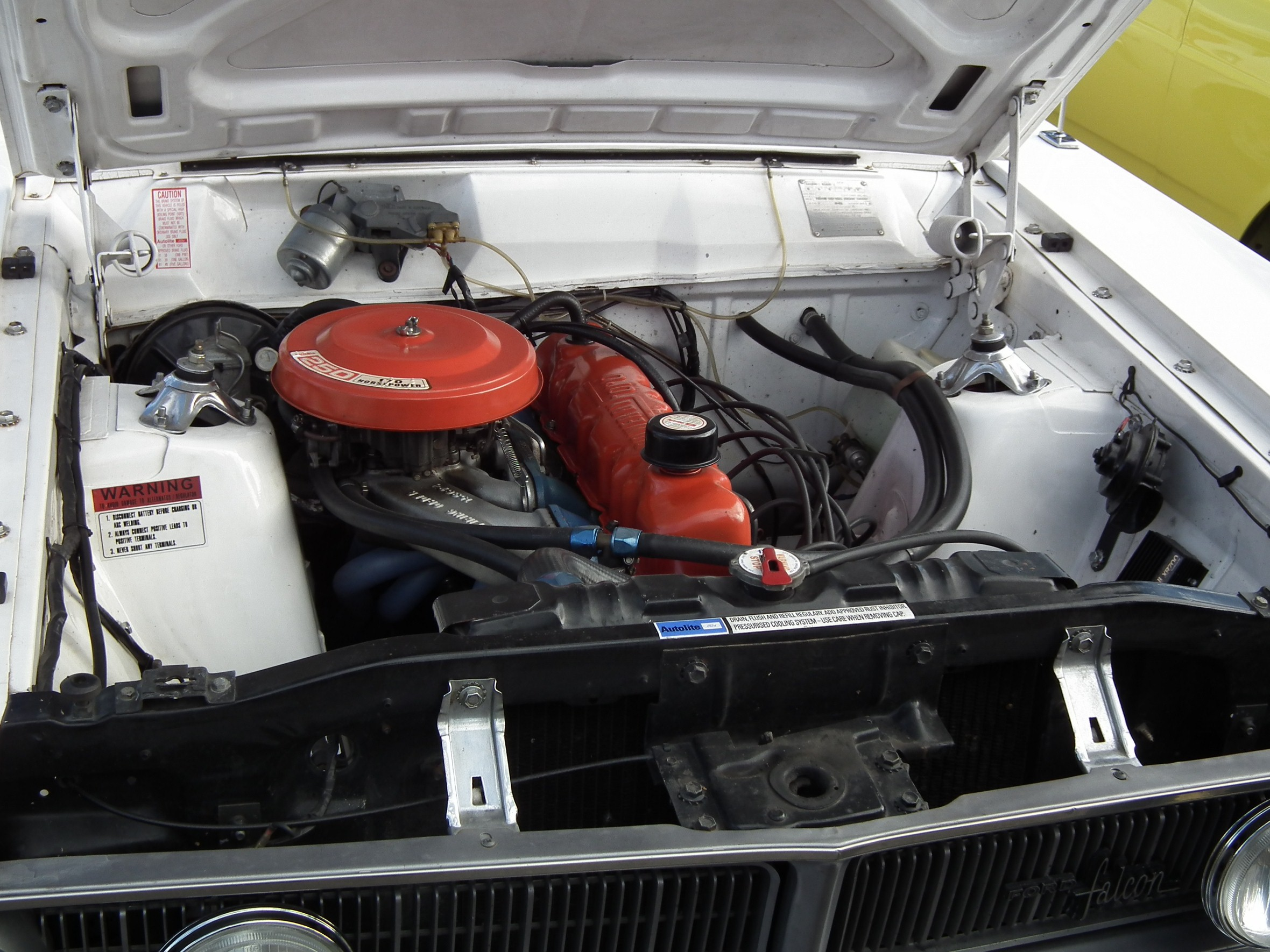
An XY series Ford Falcon fitted with the 2V variant of the 250 cu in. engine.

In 1970, in conjunction with the release of the XY Falcon, Ford Australia enlarged capacities to 200 cu in (3,273 cc) and 250 cu in (4,089 cc) displacement, reverting to imperial cubic inch measurements for identification. Retaining the same 3.68 in (93.47 mm) bore as their 188 and 221 cu in. predecessors, stroke was now increased to 3.13 in (79.50 mm) for the 200 and 3.91 in (99.31 mm) for the 250 cu. in. engine. While bore and stroke dimensions for the Australian engines were identical to their US counterparts of the same capacities, the structure of the engine was different. Both Australian engines continued to share a common block with the crankshaft positioned lower in the block to accommodate the longer stroke of the 250, whereas the US 250 engines had increased deck height. The head was of similar design to previous models, with an integral intake catering for a single-barrel Bendix-Stromberg carburettor. Outputs for the 200 and 250 cu in. engines were rated at 130 hp (97 kW) and 155 hp (116 kW) respectively. From September 1972 both 200 and 250 cu in variants also became available on locally manufactured Ford Cortinas, and by 1974 the 250 was now the standard engine for the locally assembled Ford F series truck range.

As a performance option for the XY Falcon and subsequent XA Falcon, Ford developed the 2V (two-venturi) variant of the 250 cu in. engine. This featured a cylinder head with a removable aluminum intake fitted with a Bendix-Stromberg WW two-barrel carburettor, and was further equipped with a set of extractors in place of the standard exhaust manifold, resulting in a better breathing engine that was less restricted at higher rpm. Its output was rated at 170 hp (127 kW), and road tests noted a reduction in 0 to 60 mph (97 km/h) acceleration time from 14 to 10.7 seconds over a standard Falcon equipped with the single-barrel 250 cu in. engine. However, the extra performance came at the expense of heavy fuel consumption, and the 250-2V was discontinued by the September 1973 launch date of the XB Falcon. For years, the 250-2V cylinder head was very popular for racing and many have been imported to North America, where owners of cars with the Falcon inline six have upgraded their engines with the higher-performance cylinder head.

=== Crossflow, Alloy Head, Alloy Head II and EFI ===
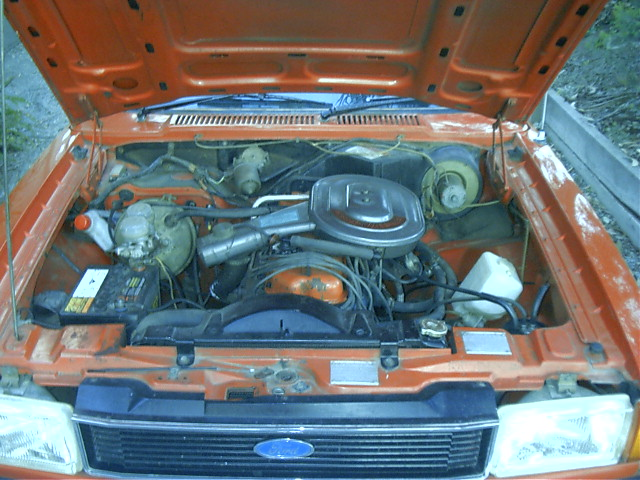
The cast iron crossflow head was introduced to the Ford Australia straight-six in 1976. As well as the Falcon/Fairmont range, the engine was also fitted to locally-built variants of the Ford Cortina, as seen here.

From 1 July 1976, new emission standards came into effect with Australian Design Rule 27A, which set limits for the emissions of hydrocarbons, carbon monoxide, and oxides of nitrogen. To meet the new requirements, compression ratios were dropped, and the engines now featured an exhaust gas recirculation valve and positive crankcase ventilation. In an effort to maintain horsepower outputs, Ford Australia updated the engines with a new cast-iron crossflow head design with larger, canted valves, and an aluminium water-heated intake manifold to improve gas flow and warm-up. Only the block, crankshaft, pistons and conrods were carried over from the old engine. Whereas the previous integral "log head" engine borrowed from the Ford FE engine family design, the new crossflow engine borrowed from the Cleveland V8 family, which was manufactured alongside the straight six at Ford Australia's Geelong Engine Plant. Introduced with the XC Falcon, engine displacements remained 200 and 250 cu in, but were now badged 3.3 and 4.1 litres, respectively, and power and torque outputs were expressed in metric units. While quoted power outputs dropped from 130 to 107 horsepower (97 to 80 kW) for the 3.3, and from 155 to 123 horsepower (116 to 92 kW) for the 4.1, power was now measured using the DIN rather than SAE gross method. Ford claimed the new crossflow engines had a performance gain of approximately ten per cent over their reverse-flow XB Falcon predecessors, which were rated at 95 horsepower (71 kW) and 111 horsepower (83 kW) respectively when tested to the same DIN method.

With the introduction of the 1979 XD Falcon, changes to compression ratio, ignition advance and revisions to port design for improved gas flow saw modest increases to power and torque outputs. In June 1980, Ford Australia updated the crossflow design with a new aluminium head casting developed in conjunction with Honda, and introduced electronic ignition. Dubbed Alloy Head and introduced as part of a mid-life update of the XD Falcon, the revised engines featured a high-swirl, lean-burn combustion chamber design that enabled higher compression ratios to be used while still meeting emissions requirements. The use of aluminium alloy meant that the engines were 22.4 kilograms (49 lb) lighter, and had improved warm-up time. Power outputs for the 3.3 and 4.1 litre engines now raised to 84 kW (113 hp) and 94 kW (126 hp) respectively, with reductions in fuel consumption of seven to ten per cent. Until 1982, the engines were fitted with a single-barrel Bendix-Stromberg carburettor, but with the introduction of the XE Falcon from March 1982, both 3.3 and 4.1 litre engines were fitted with a Weber two-stage carburettor. It featured two venturi, with the second venturi coming into operation only when the first venturi opening exceeded two-thirds. Power outputs for the new engines, designated Alloy Head II, increased to 90 kW (120 hp) and 105 kW (141 hp) respectively, and fuel economy improved over that of the previous Alloy Head engines with single-barrel carburettor.

In March 1983, direct-port fuel injection using Bosch Jetronic LE was offered as an option on the 4.1 L engine. With the release of the XF Falcon the following year, the injected 4.1 was upgraded with Ford's EEC-IV engine management system with Multi Point Electronic Fuel Injection (MP-EFI). Changes to the carburettor-based engine were made to accommodate the EFI system. The cylinder head intake ports had been modified to provide clearance for the injectors, and a new intake manifold was designed and many other changes were made in the engine bay to accommodate the new fuel system.

In response to Australian Design Rule 37, which required all new cars sold after 1 January 1986 to operate with unleaded petrol, Falcon engines were modified for running on regular grade 91 RON unleaded fuel and equipped with catalytic converters. Despite revisions that included a higher-lift camshaft and revised combustion chamber shape, power and torque outputs for the carburetted 3.3 and 4.1 litre engines fell to 88 kW (118 hp) and 97.5 kW (130.7 hp), although maximum power output from the 4.1 EFI engine increased slightly to 121 kW (162 hp). While the OHV six-cylinder engines were replaced by OHC variants across the Ford Australia passenger car range in 1988, the carburetted 4.1 litre engine remained in production until 1993 along with the ute and panel van variants of the XF Falcon for which it was the only engine offered.

=== OHC and Intech ===
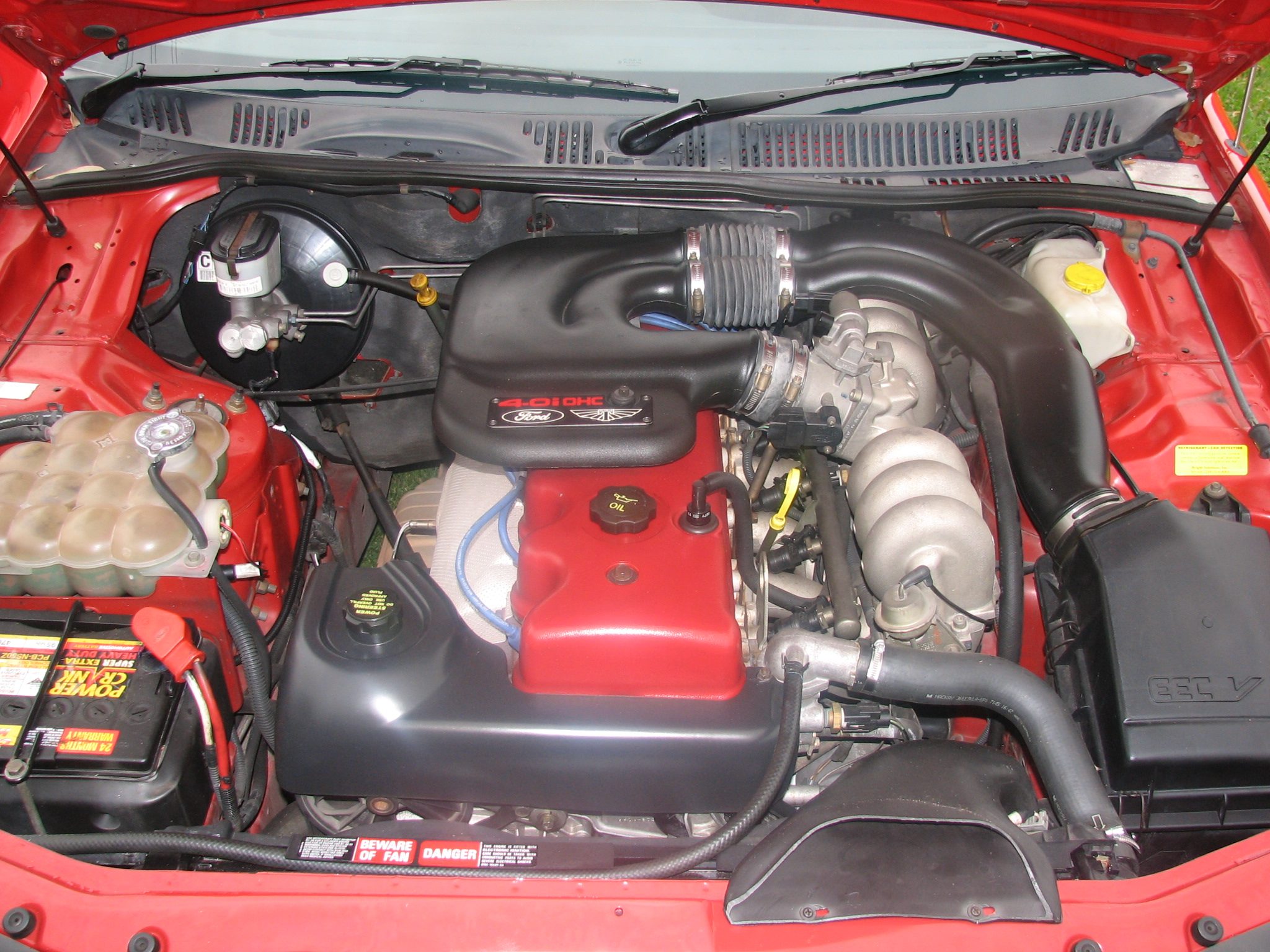
The straight six as seen in the performance-oriented 1994-1996 EF series Ford Falcon XR6. By this time, it had evolved from an OHV to a SOHC design, featuring multipoint fuel injection and a dual-resonance intake manifold.

In 1988, the inline six engines underwent a major redesign for the EA26 Falcon and now featured a new single overhead cam (SOHC) crossflow aluminium head. Two engine sizes were offered, based on a common 91.86 mm (3.617 in) cylinder bore. The smaller engine, dubbed 3.2 litre, featured a 79.30 mm (3.122 in) stroke and a swept volume of 3,157 cubic centimetres (193 cu in). The larger engine, dubbed 3.9 litre, shared the 99.31 mm (3.910 in) stroke of the previous 4.1 litre engine for a swept volume of 3,949 cubic centimetres (241 cu in). Electronic fuel injection was now used across with range, with the 90 kW (121 hp) 3.2 litre engine equipped with throttle body injection, and the 3.9 litre engine available with a choice of 120 kW (161 hp) throttle body injected or 139 kW (186 hp) multipoint fuel injected variants.

The updated design featured camshaft and auxiliary shafts driven by a duplex chain, and chain drive to the distributor and the oil pump shafts. The camshaft was supported on the cylinder head by using 'topless' bearings; bearing liners were not used. The camshaft was held in position using valve spring pressure, with hydraulic lash adjusters mounted on the rocker arms were used to provide zero valve lash.

By late 1988, the 90 kW (121 hp) 3.2 litre engine was no longer competitive against the 125 kW (168 hp) base engine option offered in the newly released Holden Commodore and was discontinued by the end of that year, leaving the two 3.9 litre engines as the only choices. In 1992, in conjunction with a mid-life update of the EB Falcon, the cylinder bore was increased to 92.25 millimetres (3.632 in), increasing swept volume to 3,984 cubic centimetres (243 cu in). Dubbed 4.0 litre and now available only with multipoint fuel injection, the engine was rated at 148 kW (198 hp).

During 1992, a high output variant of the 4.0 litre engine, featuring a modified cylinder head and camshaft developed by Tickford Vehicle Engineering, was introduced. Fitted to the sports-oriented Falcon S-XR6 (renamed Falcon XR6 with the updated ED Falcon in 1993) it developed 161 kW (216 hp), only 4 kW (5 hp) less than the optional 5.0 litre V8 also offered with the EB and ED Falcon.

In conjunction with the release of the EF Falcon range in 1994, Ford introduced a dual resonance intake manifold aimed at providing greater low-speed torque, branding the system Computer Torque Control. While the torque peak of the standard engine increased by only 9 N⋅m (7 lbf⋅ft) to 357 N⋅m (263 lbf⋅ft), Ford claimed that mid-range torque was now as much as 28 N⋅m (21 lbf⋅ft) higher. Power increased to 157 kW (211 hp) for the standard engine, and 164 kW (220 hp) for the high-output XR6 variant. The engine management system was upgraded to Ford's EEC V, and the distributor was replaced by a three-coil ignition system with each coil firing two spark plugs. However, the subsequent EL Falcon reverted to a distributor/coil ignition setup.

Ford Australia redesigned the I-6 again, naming it the Intech, in 1998 alongside the introduction of the Ford Falcon (AU), and increased the main bearing size and added a ladder style main stud girdle integral with the oil pan to increase low end rigidity. The engine also received variable camshaft timing technology in some XR6 models, Fairlane/LTD models and the Fairmont Ghia which allowed the ECU to advance or retard camshaft timing depending on engine speed, which results in a broader power band. The Composite Headgasket from the previous models was replaced with a Multi-Layer-Steel (MLS) gasket. Power outputs for the base model Falcon Forte, Fairmont, and the standard XR6 were unchanged from their EL series predecessors, but a new 172 kW (231 hp) XR6 VCT model was offered. The Fairmont Ghia, Fairlane and LTD models were also equipped with a 168 kW (225 hp) variant of the VCT engine.

=== Barra ===
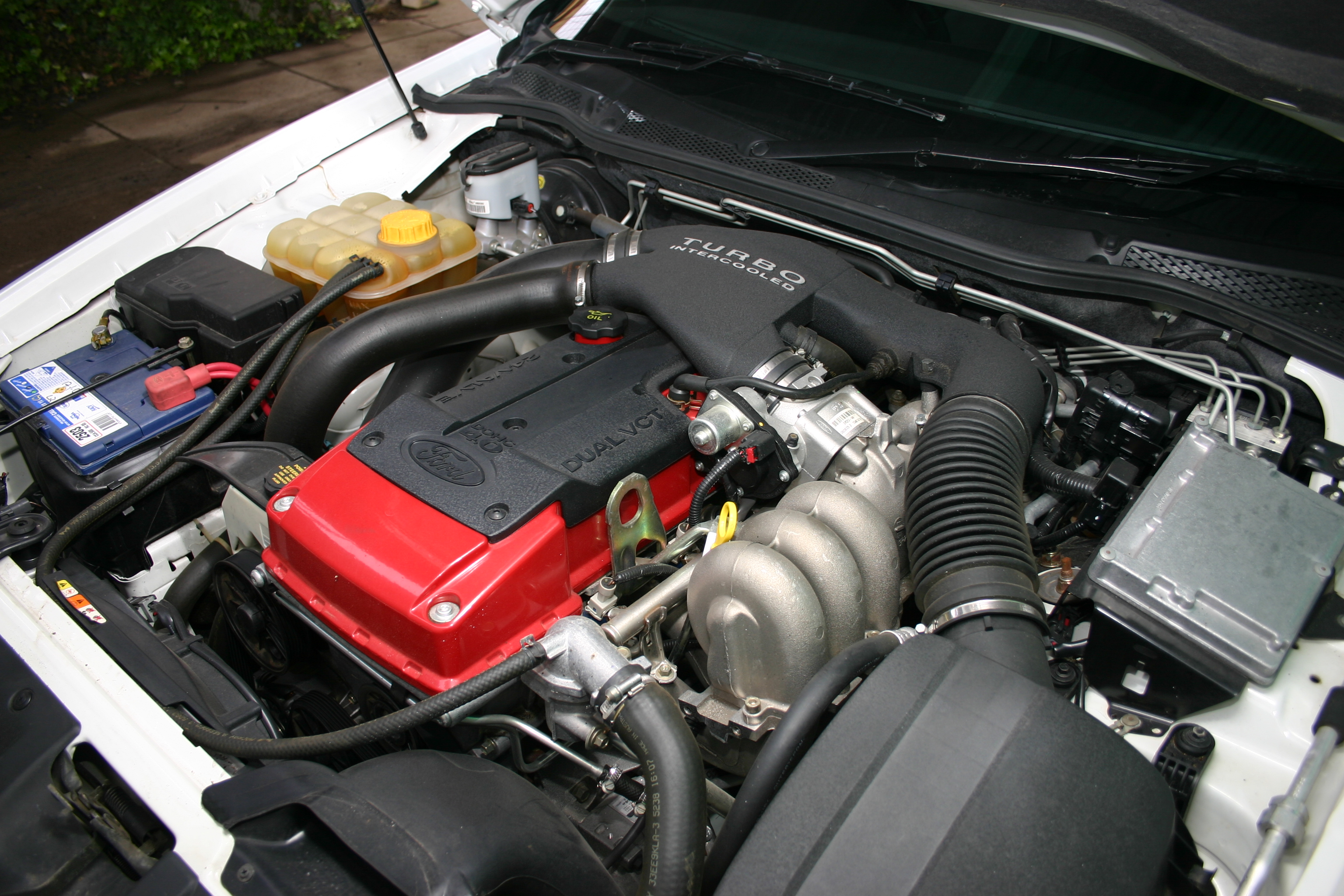
The 245 kW (329 hp) turbocharged variant of the DOHC 24-valve six. The Barra engines all featured variable cam timing on both camshafts.

In 2002, the engine underwent a significant upgrade receiving dual overhead cams (DOHC) with variable cam timing and coil-on-plug ignition. The engine gained the nickname "Barra", named after the "Barramundi" code name used during the development of the Ford Falcon (BA), and a numerical suffix was used to identify the engine variant by its output in kilowatts. Producing 182 kW (244 hp) and 380 N⋅m (280 lb⋅ft) in Barra 182 form, it debuted in the Ford Falcon (BA) of 2002 and also powered the Ford Territory introduced in 2004. In October 2005, alongside the introduction of the Ford Falcon (BF) and Ford Territory (SY), these outputs rose to 190 kW (250 hp) and 383 N⋅m (282 lb⋅ft). In 2008 the Barra was upgraded a final time, debuting in the Ford Falcon (FG) with power outputs of 195 kW (261 hp) and 391 N⋅m (288 lb⋅ft).

Turbocharged versions were also manufactured. The initial version, known as Barra 240T with 240 kW (322 hp) and 450 N⋅m (330 lb⋅ft) of torque was offered between 2002 and 2005 in the BA Falcon XR6 Turbo, as well as the Territory Turbo. This was followed in the BF and BF Mk II XR6 Turbo (between 2005 and 2008) by the Barra 245T producing 245 kW (329 hp) of power and 480 N⋅m (350 lb⋅ft) of torque, which in turn was followed by the Barra 270T from 2008-2016 in the FG and FG X XR6 Turbo and G6E Turbo models producing 270 kW (362 hp) of power and 533 N⋅m (393 lb⋅ft) of torque.

Ford Australia's high-performance division, Ford Performance Vehicles (FPV), created even more powerful turbocharged variants. The first turbocharged straight six-engined car from FPV was the BA Mk II F6 Typhoon (2004), which produced 270 kW (362 hp) of power and 550 N⋅m (410 lb⋅ft) of torque. The first power and torque upgrade came with the FG range of 2008, which saw outputs rise to 310 kW (416 hp) of power at 5500 rpm and 565 N⋅m (417 lb⋅ft) of torque. This engine, the Barra 310T, was the first Australian-built engine to achieve over 100 hp (75 kW) per litre.

The ultimate iteration of the Barra engine was installed in the limited-production FG X XR6 Sprint (limited to 500 units) of 2016. This engine produced 325 kW (436 hp) at 6000 rpm and 576 N⋅m (425 lb⋅ft) at 2750 rpm. The engine features an overboost function that can increase output to 370 kW (496 hp) and 650 N⋅m (480 lb⋅ft) for up to ten seconds.

Ford Australia had intended to discontinue production of the straight six engine at their engine plant in Geelong in 2010 and replace it in the Falcon and Territory models with an imported V6 engine, although later reversed this decision in favour of upgrading the Barra to meet then-upcoming Euro IV emissions standards. This would prove to be only a temporary stay of execution as the Geelong factory eventually closed on 26 September 2016, following Ford's decision in May 2013 to discontinue the Falcon and Territory and cease manufacture of vehicles in Australia. The last Australian-built Ford, and the last Ford passenger vehicle to be fitted with a straight-six engine, rolled off the production line at the Broadmeadows Assembly Plant on 7 October 2016. It was a Kinetic Blue FG X Falcon XR6 sedan, equipped with the naturally aspirated Barra 195 straight six engine.

=== Ford Falcon (Australia) straight-six engine specifications ===
Year	Falcon model	Capacity	Induction	Valvetrain	Fuel	Power	Torque	Notes
1964-1966	XM, XP	144 cu in (2.4 L)	Carburettor	OHV	Leaded	96 hp (72 kW)	138 lb⋅ft (187 N⋅m)	SAE gross horsepower outputs quoted until 1976
1964-1966	XM, XP	144 cu in (2.4 L)	Carburettor	OHV	Leaded	80 hp (60 kW)	127 lb⋅ft (172 N⋅m)	Special order low compression (7.5:1) option
1964-1968	XM, XP, XR	170 cu in (2.8 L)	Carburettor	OHV	Leaded	111 hp (83 kW)	156 lb⋅ft (212 N⋅m)	
1964-1968	XM, XP, XR	200 cu in (3.3 L)	Carburettor	OHV	Leaded	121 hp (90 kW)	185 lb⋅ft (251 N⋅m)	
1968-1969	XT	3.1 L	Carburettor	OHV	Leaded	114 hp (85 kW)	180 lb⋅ft (244 N⋅m)	
1968-1969	XT	3.6 L	Carburettor	OHV	Leaded	135 hp (101 kW)	208 lb⋅ft (282 N⋅m)	
1969-1970	XW	3.1 L	Carburettor	OHV	Leaded	118 hp (88 kW)	180 lb⋅ft (244 N⋅m)	
1969-1970	XW	3.6 L	Carburettor	OHV	Leaded	140 hp (104 kW)	210 lb⋅ft (285 N⋅m)	
1970-1976	XY, XA, XB	200 cu in (3.3 L)	Carburettor	OHV	Leaded	130 hp (97 kW)	190 lb⋅ft (258 N⋅m)	
1970-1976	XY, XA, XB	250 cu in (4.1 L)	Carburettor	OHV	Leaded	155 hp (116 kW)	240 lb⋅ft (325 N⋅m)	
1970-1973	XY, XA	250 cu in (4.1 L)	2V Carburettor	OHV	Leaded	170 hp (127 kW)	250 lb⋅ft (339 N⋅m)	
1976-1979	XC	3.3 L	Carburettor	OHV	Leaded	80 kW (107 hp)	220 N⋅m (162 lb⋅ft)	DIN kilowatt outputs quoted from 1976 XC onwards, Crossflow cylinder head
1976-1979	XC	4.1 L	Carburettor	OHV	Leaded	92 kW (123 hp)	289 N⋅m (213 lb⋅ft)	Crossflow cylinder head
1979-1980	XD	3.3 L	Carburettor	OHV	Leaded	82 kW (110 hp)	228 N⋅m (168 lb⋅ft)	Crossflow cylinder head
1979-1980	XD	4.1 L	Carburettor	OHV	Leaded	94 kW (126 hp)	295 N⋅m (218 lb⋅ft)	Crossflow cylinder head
1980-1982	XD	3.3 L	Carburettor	OHV	Leaded	84 kW (113 hp)	230 N⋅m (170 lb⋅ft)	Alloy Head
1980-1982	XD	4.1 L	Carburettor	OHV	Leaded	94 kW (126 hp)	305 N⋅m (225 lb⋅ft)	Alloy Head
1982-1985	XE, XF	3.3 L	2V Carburettor	OHV	Leaded	90 kW (121 hp)	240 N⋅m (177 lb⋅ft)	Alloy Head II
1982-1984	XE	4.1 L	2V Carburettor	OHV	Leaded	105 kW (141 hp)	310 N⋅m (229 lb⋅ft)	Alloy Head II, outputs later restated in 1983 as 98 kW (131 hp) and 305 N⋅m (225 lb⋅ft)
1983-1984	XE	4.1 L	EFI	OHV	Leaded	111 kW (149 hp)	325 N⋅m (240 lb⋅ft)	Bosch LE II Jetronic fuel injection
1984-1985	XF	4.1 L	2V Carburettor	OHV	Leaded	103 kW (138 hp)	316 N⋅m (233 lb⋅ft)	Alloy Head II
1984-1985	XF	4.1 L	EFI	OHV	Leaded	120 kW (161 hp)	333 N⋅m (246 lb⋅ft)	Ford EEC-IV Multi-point EFI
1986-1988	XF	3.3 L	2V Carburettor	OHV	Unleaded	88 kW (118 hp)	235 N⋅m (173 lb⋅ft)	Alloy Head II
1986-1993	XF	4.1 L	2V Carburettor	OHV	Unleaded	97.5 kW (131 hp)	297 N⋅m (219 lb⋅ft)	Alloy Head II
1986-1988	XF	4.1 L	EFI	OHV	Unleaded	121 kW (162 hp)	325 N⋅m (240 lb⋅ft)	Ford EEC-IV Multi-point EFI
1988	EA	3.2 L	EFI	SOHC	Unleaded	90 kW (121 hp)	235 N⋅m (173 lb⋅ft)	Throttle body injection
1988-1992	EA, EB	3.9 L	EFI	SOHC	Unleaded	120 kW (161 hp)	311 N⋅m (229 lb⋅ft)	Throttle body injection
1988-1992	EA, EB	3.9 L	EFI	SOHC	Unleaded	139 kW (186 hp)	338 N⋅m (249 lb⋅ft)	EEC-IV Multi-point injection
1992-1994	EB series II, ED	4.0 L	EFI	SOHC	Unleaded	148 kW (198 hp)	348 N⋅m (257 lb⋅ft)	
1992-1994	XR6 EBII, ED	4.0 L	EFI	SOHC	Unleaded	161 kW (216 hp)	361 N⋅m (266 lb⋅ft)	Tickford enhanced
1994-2002	EF, EL, AU series I, II & III	4.0 L	EFI	SOHC	Unleaded	157 kW (211 hp)	357 N⋅m (263 lb⋅ft)	Two-stage broadband intake manifold, coil-pack ignition system (EF and AU Only)
1994-2002	XR6 EF, EL, AU series I, II & III	4.0 L	EFI	SOHC	Unleaded	164 kW (220 hp)	366 N⋅m (270 lb⋅ft)	Tickford enhanced, also standard fitment on EF and EL Fairmont Ghia
2000-2002	AU series II and III	4.0 L	Carburettor	SOHC	LPG	143 kW (192 hp)	362 N⋅m (267 lb⋅ft)	E-Gas dedicated LPG
1998-2002	Fairmont Ghia AU series I, II & III	4.0 L	EFI	SOHC	Unleaded	168 kW (225 hp)	370 N⋅m (273 lb⋅ft)	VCT Variable valve timing
1998-2002	XR6 AU series I, II & III	4.0 L	EFI	SOHC	Unleaded	172 kW (231 hp)	374 N⋅m (276 lb⋅ft)	VCT Variable valve timing, performance exhaust
2002-2005	BA	4.0 L	EFI	DOHC	Unleaded	182 kW (244 hp)	380 N⋅m (280 lb⋅ft)	Dual overhead camshaft, VCT Variable valve timing
2002-2005	BA XR6 Turbo	4.0 L	EFI, turbo	DOHC	Unleaded	240 kW (322 hp)	450 N⋅m (332 lb⋅ft)	Garrett GT3582 turbocharger
2005-2008	BF	4.0 L	EFI	DOHC	Unleaded	190 kW (255 hp)	383 N⋅m (282 lb⋅ft)	
2005-2008	BF XR6 Turbo	4.0 L	EFI, turbo	DOHC	Unleaded	245 kW (329 hp)	480 N⋅m (354 lb⋅ft)	Garrett GT3582 turbocharger
2008-2016	FG, FG X	4.0 L	EFI	DOHC	Unleaded	195 kW (261 hp)	391 N⋅m (288 lb⋅ft)	
2011-2016	FG, FG X ECO-LPI	4.0 L	EFI	DOHC	LPG	198 kW (266 hp)	409 N⋅m (302 lb⋅ft)	Dedicated LPG
2008-2016	FG, FG X XR6 Turbo	4.0 L	EFI, turbo	DOHC	Unleaded	270 kW (362 hp)	533 N⋅m (393 lb⋅ft)	Garrett GT3576 turbocharger
2016	FG X XR6 Sprint	4.0 L	EFI, turbo	DOHC	Unleaded	325 kW (436 hp)	576 N⋅m (425 lb⋅ft)	370 kW (496 hp) and 650 N⋅m (479 lb⋅ft) with overboost function.

FPV F6 model	Capacity	Induction	Valvetrain	Fuel	Power	Torque	Notes
BA MkII, BF	4.0 L	EFI, turbo	DOHC	Unleaded	270 kW (362 hp)	550 N⋅m (406 lb⋅ft)	
FG	4.0 L	EFI, turbo	DOHC	Unleaded	310 kW (416 hp)	565 N⋅m (417 lb⋅ft)	
