= Mercury Marquis =

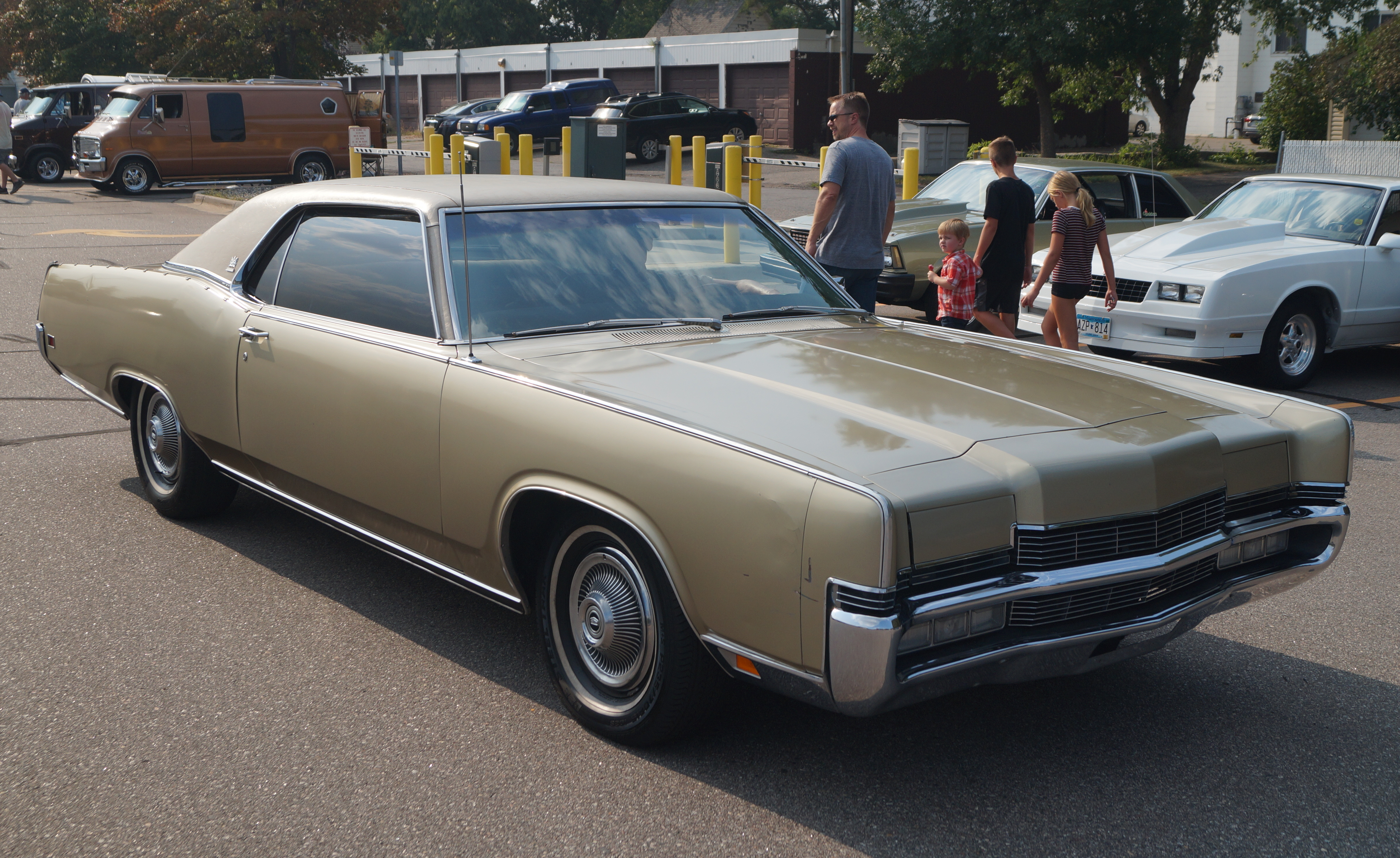
- 1970 Mercury Marquis Brougham 2-door hardtop

Overview
- Manufacturer: Mercury (Ford)
- Production: 1967–1986

Body and chassis
- Class: Full-size (1967–1982); Mid-size (1983–1986)

Chronology
- Predecessor: Mercury Montclair; Mercury Monterey; Mercury Park Lane
- Successor: Full-size: Mercury Grand Marquis; Mid-size: Mercury Sable

The Mercury Marquis is a model line of automobiles marketed by Mercury from 1967 to 1986. Deriving its name from a title of French nobility, the Marquis was introduced as the divisional counterpart of the Ford LTD; four generations of the two model lines were paired through rebranding. Initially slotted as the flagship Mercury full-size range (above the Monterey), the Marquis would serve as the basis for the later Mercury Grand Marquis.

The first three generations of the Marquis were full-size sedans (alongside the Mercury Colony Park station wagon). For the fourth generation, the Marquis became the mid-size Mercury sedan, following the 1983 split of the Marquis and Grand Marquis into distinct product lines. As Ford Motor Company expanded its use of front-wheel drive, the Marquis ended production after the 1986 model year, replaced by the Mercury Sable (the Mercury counterpart of the Ford Taurus). As the Grand Marquis, the nameplate continued on until the closure of Mercury during the 2011 model year.

For its first three generations, the Mercury Marquis was produced by Ford in Hapeville, Georgia (Atlanta Assembly), Hazelwood, Missouri (St. Louis Assembly), and Pico Rivera, California (Los Angeles Assembly); the fourth generation was produced by Atlanta Assembly and in Chicago, Illinois (Chicago Assembly).

== First generation (1967–1968) ==
First generation
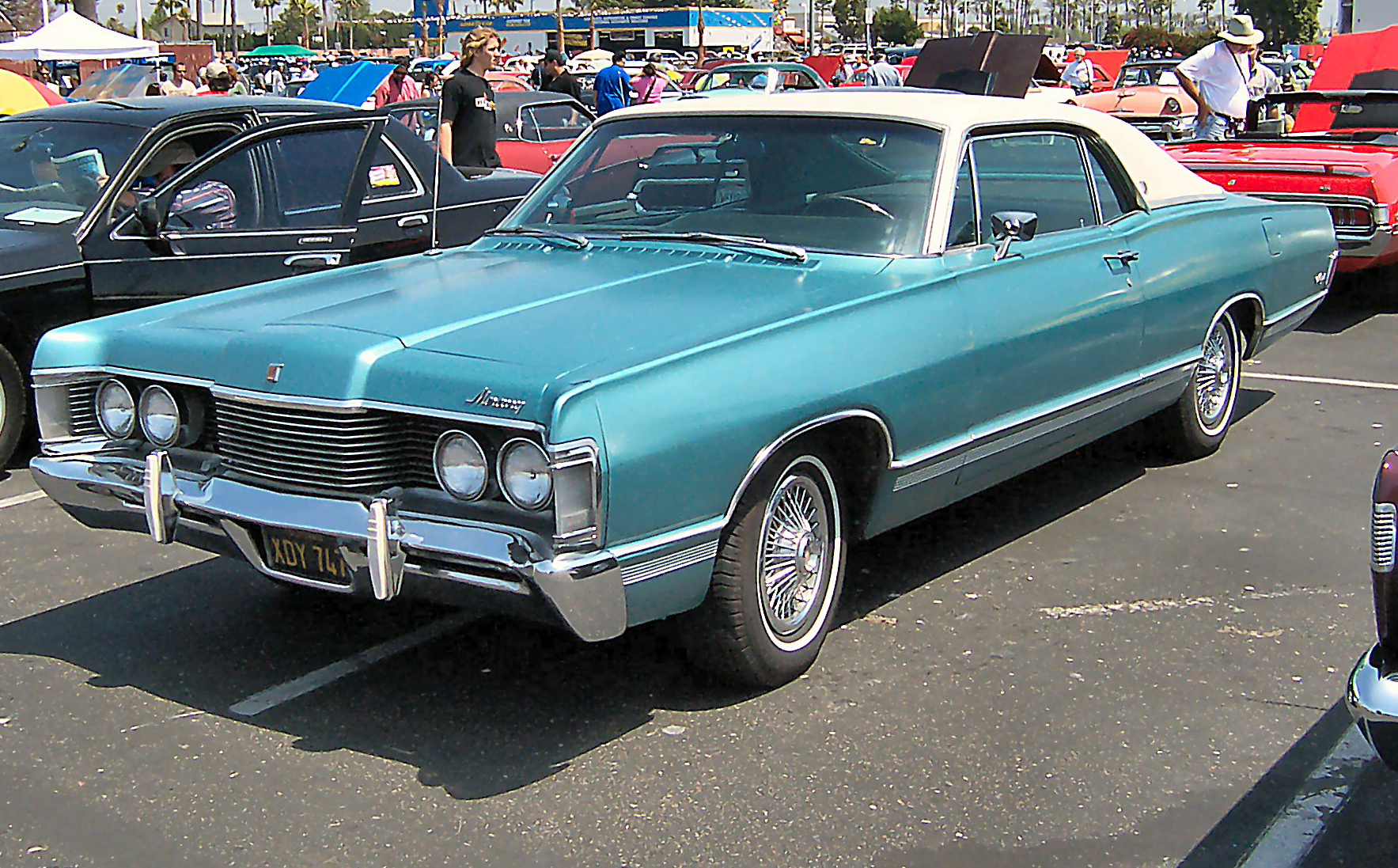
- 1968 Mercury Marquis

Overview
- Production: 1967–1968
- Assembly: Hazelwood, Missouri (St. Louis Assembly Plant); Pico Rivera, California (Los Angeles Assembly); Hapeville, Georgia (Atlanta Assembly)

Body and chassis
- Body style: 2-door hardtop
- Related: Mercury Monterey; Mercury Park Lane Brougham; Ford LTD; Meteor Montego/LeMoyne (Canada)

Powertrain
- Engine: 390 cu in (6.4 L) FE V8; 410 cu in (6.7 L) FE V8; 428 cu in (7.0 L) Super Marauder V8
- Transmission: 3-speed FX/MX automatic (1967); 3-speed FMX automatic (1968)

Dimensions
- Wheelbase: 123.0 in (3,124 mm) (1967)
- Length: 218.5 in (5,550 mm)
- Width: 77.9 in (1,979 mm)
- Height: 55.1 in (1,400 mm)

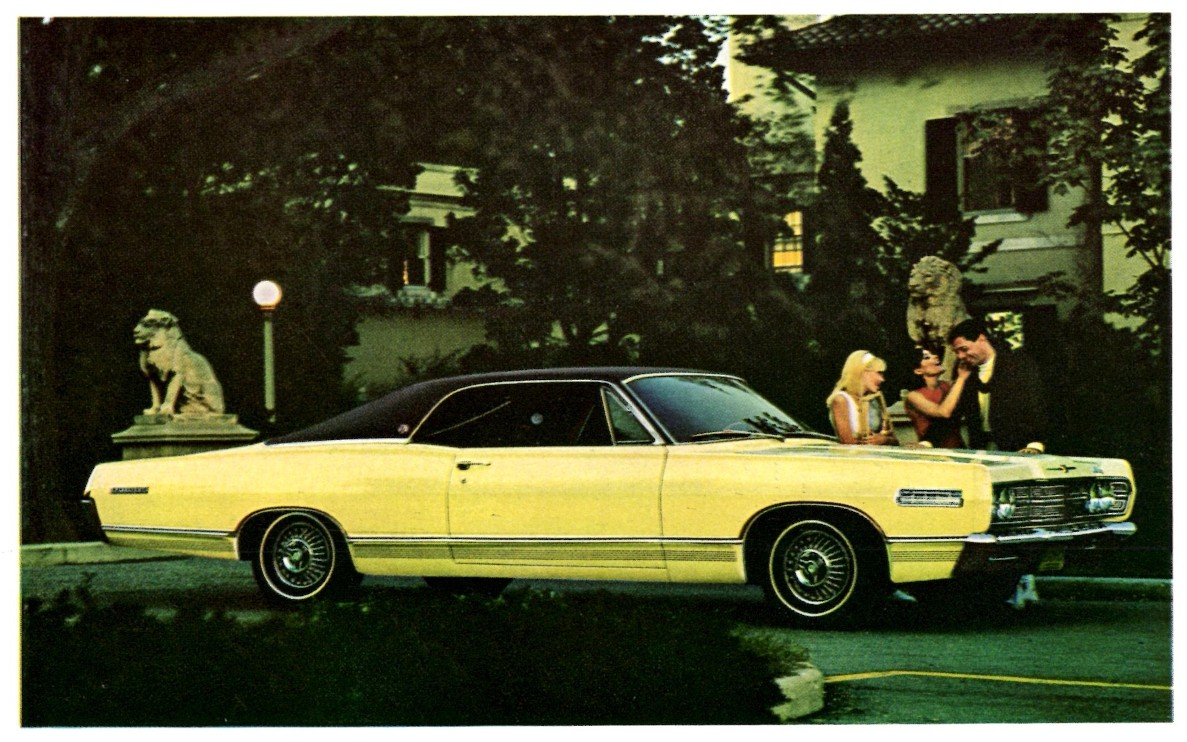
1967 Mercury Marquis two-door hardtop

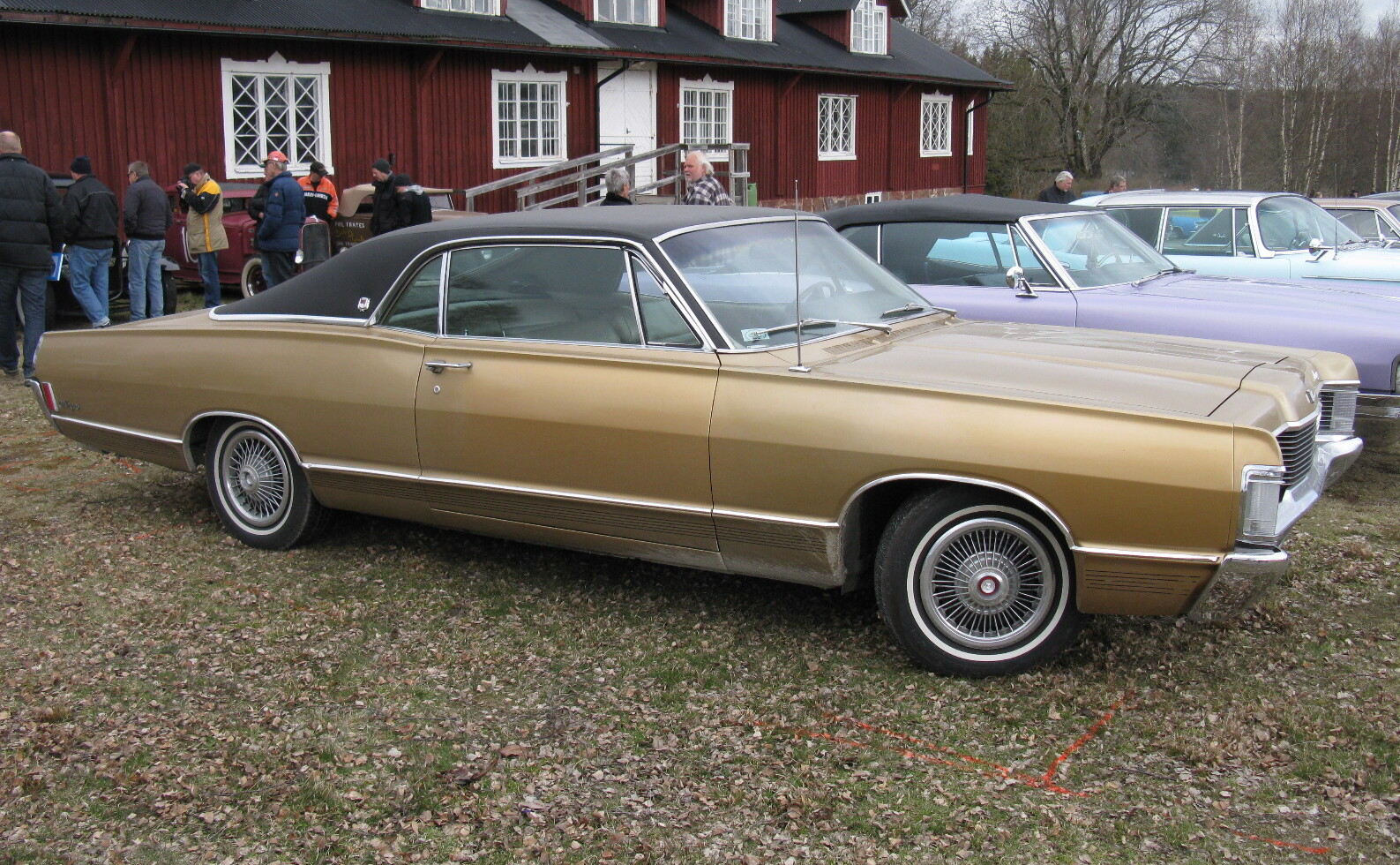
1968 Mercury Marquis

For 1967, Mercury introduced two hardtop model lines above the Park Lane to serve as the counterpart of the Ford LTD. The Park Lane Brougham was a four-door, with the Marquis offered solely as a two-door. While all full-size Mercury two-doors were hardtops, the Marquis was fitted with a standard vinyl roof giving it a wider C-pillar.

While sharing a roofline with the Ford LTD, the Marquis differed from its Ford counterpart from the use of higher-specification interior trim (wood trim in place of simulated wood, optional leather unavailable on the LTD). As with other Mercury sedans, the Marquis was built on a 123-inch wheelbase (4 inches longer than the LTD).

In contrast to the full-width bench seat of other Mercury lines, the Marquis was fitted with "Twin Comfort Lounge" front seats. Designed as a 50/50 split bench seat, the design combined the 3-passenger capacity of a bench seat with the individual legroom adjustment of bucket seats. In various forms, the design would gradually replace traditional bench seats in many American cars during the 1970s and 1980s.

=== Mechanical details ===
For 1967, the standard engine for the Marquis was a 410 cubic-inch Marauder V8, producing 330 hp. Exclusive to the division, the Marauder V8 was optional across the full-size Mercury line. A 4-speed manual transmission was standard, with a 3-speed automatic as an option.

For 1968, the 410 was replaced by a 390 cubic-inch Marauder Super 390 V8, producing 315 hp; shared with the Park Lane and Brougham, the engine was optional for lower-trim full-size Mercurys. A 3-speed manual replaced the previous 4-speed, with the automatic returning as an option.

As an option for both years, the 428 cubic-inch Super Marauder V8 was offered, producing 345 hp; for 1968, the engine was retuned to 340 hp.

First-generation Mercury Marquis powertrain specifications
Engine name (Engine family)	Production	Configuration	Fuel system	Output		Transmission
Engine name (Engine family)	Production	Configuration	Fuel system	Horsepower	Torque	Transmission
Marauder V8 (Ford FE)	1967	410 cu in (6.7 L) OHV V8	4-bbl carburetor	330 hp (246 kW)	444 lb⋅ft (602 N⋅m)	4-speed manual (1967) 3-speed manual (1968) Ford 3-speed FX/MX (Merc-O-Matic) automatic (1967) Ford 3-speed FMX (Merc-O-Matic) automatic (1968)
Marauder Super 390 V8 (Ford FE)	1968	390 cu in (6.4 L) OHV V8	4-bbl carburetor	315 hp (235 kW)	427 lb⋅ft (579 N⋅m)	4-speed manual (1967) 3-speed manual (1968) Ford 3-speed FX/MX (Merc-O-Matic) automatic (1967) Ford 3-speed FMX (Merc-O-Matic) automatic (1968)
Super Marauder V8 (Ford FE)	1967–1968	428 cu in (7.0 L) OHV V8	4-bbl carburetor	345 hp (257 kW) (1967) 340 hp (254 kW) (1968)	462 lb⋅ft (626 N⋅m)	4-speed manual (1967) 3-speed manual (1968) Ford 3-speed FX/MX (Merc-O-Matic) automatic (1967) Ford 3-speed FMX (Merc-O-Matic) automatic (1968)

== Second generation (1969–1978) ==
Second generation
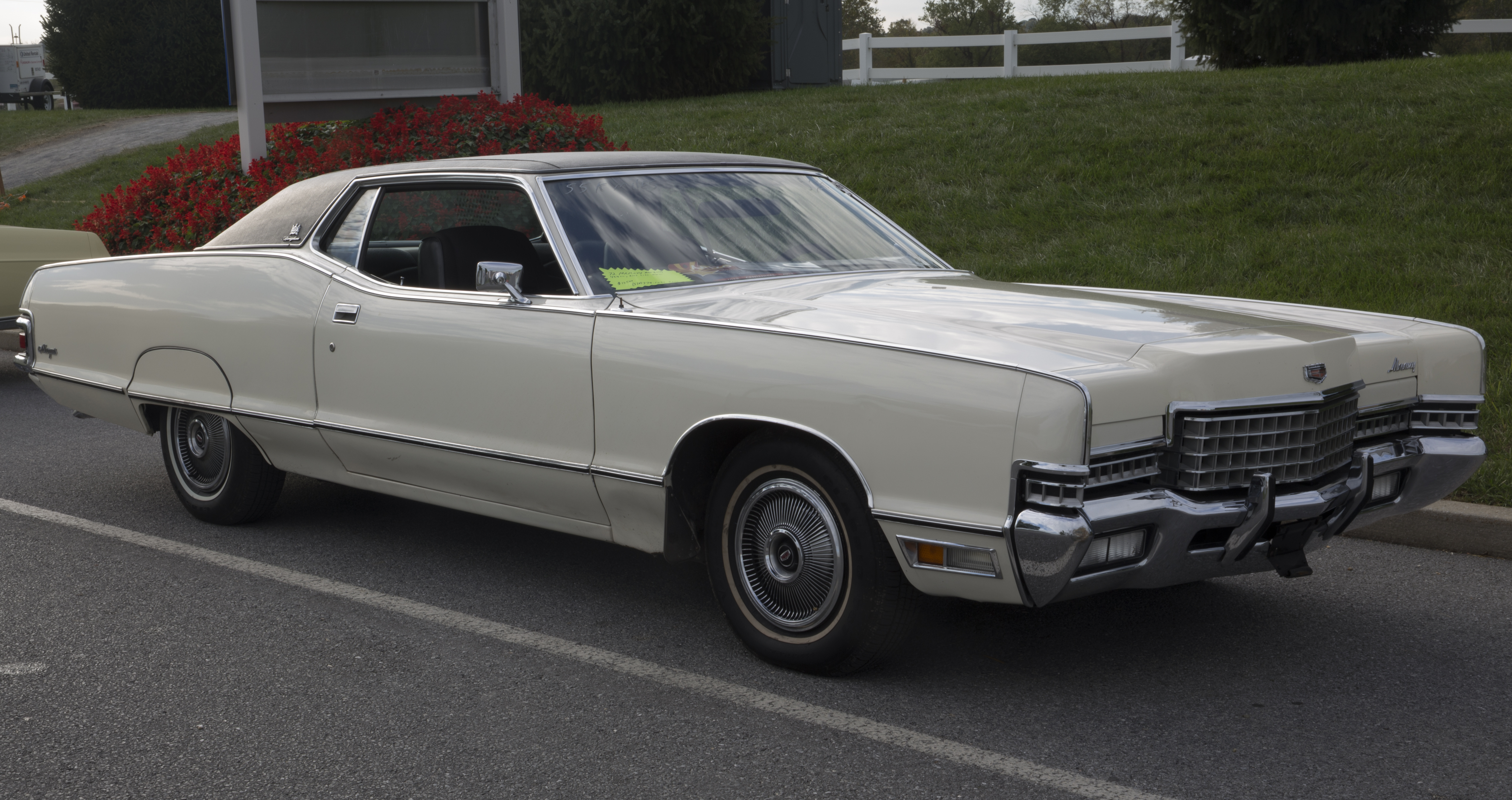
- 1972 Marquis Brougham 2-door Hardtop

Overview
- Also called: Meteor LeMoyne (Canada; 1969–1970); Mercury Marquis Meteor (Canada; 1977–1978)
- Model years: 1969–1978
- Assembly: Hazelwood, Missouri (St. Louis Assembly Plant); Pico Rivera, California (Los Angeles Assembly); Hapeville, Georgia (Atlanta Assembly)

Body and chassis
- Body style: 2-door hardtop 4-door hardtop 4-door pillared hardtop 2-door convertible 5-door station wagon
- Related: Mercury Grand Marquis; Mercury Monterey; Mercury Colony Park; Ford LTD

Powertrain
- Engine: 351 cu in (5.8 L) 351M V8; 402 cu in (6.6 L) 400 Cleveland V8; 429 cu in (7.0 L) 385 V8; 460 cu in (7.5 L) 385 V8
- Transmission: 3-speed C6 automatic 3-speed FMX automatic

Dimensions
- Wheelbase: 121.0 in (3,073 mm) (wagon); 124.0 in (3,150 mm) (2-door, 4-door)
- Length: 229.0 in (5,817 mm)
- Width: 79.8 in (2,027 mm); 79.6 in (2,022 mm)
- Curb weight: 4,470 lb (2,028 kg) (2-door); 4,508 lb (2,045 kg) (4-door)

For 1969, Mercury underwent a revision of its full-size range. Serving as the successor to the four-door Brougham and two-door Park Lane, the second-generation Marquis was expanded to a full range of body styles, slotted above the Monterey. For 1975, the full-size Mercury range was reduced solely to the Marquis (including the Brougham and Grand Marquis trims). The wheelbase was longer on the two-door and four-door sedan than the Mercury Colony Park station wagon, the Lincoln Continental Mark III and the Lincoln Continental Mark IV while sharing the chassis with the 1970 Lincoln Continental sedan. The 1969 Marquis four-door hardtop sedan was listed at US$3,973 ($34,881 in 2025 dollars) and 29,389 were made.

In Canada, the Meteor brand marketed the Marquis as its flagship Meteor LeMoyne from 1969 to 1970. After the 1976 closure of the brand, Ford Canada continued the use of the Meteor name within Mercury, selling a Marquis Meteor as a base trim level for 1977 and 1978.

=== Chassis specifications ===
The second-generation Mercury Marquis shares its chassis with the full-size Ford model range introduced in 1969, using a rear-wheel drive perimeter frame chassis. Following a tradition starting in 1961, Mercury sedans used a longer wheelbase (124 inches) than Fords (121 inches, also used by Ford/Mercury station wagons). For 1970, the chassis was adopted by the Lincoln division for the Continental on a 127-inch wheelbase.

Carried over from the previous-generation full-size chassis, the suspension was a 3-link live rear axle and double wishbone independent front suspension (with a front stabilizer bar); coil springs were fitted to at all four corners.

Front disc brake and rear drum brakes were standard; power brakes became standard in 1971. For 1973, "Sure-Track", an early form of anti-lock braking, was introduced as an option; four-wheel disc brakes became an option for 1975.

==== Powertrain ====
For the second generation of the Marquis, Mercury revised the powertrain line. Along with ending its Marauder branding for engines, Mercury replaced both the 390 and 428 FE-series engines with a 429-cubic inch 385-series V8. A short-stroke version of the Lincoln 460 V8, the Marquis offered the 429 with 2-barrel and 4-barrel carburetors (320 and 360 hp, respectively). The manual transmission was discontinued, paired solely with the 3-speed Ford C6 heavy-duty automatic. During the 1972 model year, the Marquis received the 460 from Lincoln as an option; for 1974, the 460 replaced the 429 outright.

As the 1970s progressed, Mercury began efforts to improve emissions and fuel economy of its full-size range; following the discontinuation of the Monterey and the introduction of the Grand Marquis, smaller-displacement Ford 335 engines replaced the 460 as the standard engine offering. For 1975, the 402 cubic-inch Ford 400 V8 was introduced (largely as a successor to the 429), with the 351 cubic-inch Ford 351M V8 becoming the standard engine for the Marquis in 1978. In California and for "high-altitude" use, the 400 remained standard equipment; regardless of usage, the 460 (standard on the Marquis Brougham and Grand Marquis through 1977) remained available as an option until the end of the generation. The C6 transmission remained paired to the 460, with the 400 and 351M using the lighter-duty FMX transmission.

Second-generation Mercury Marquis powertrain specifications
Engine name (Engine family)	Production	Fuel system	Configuration	Output (Note: Gross output figures for 1969–1971)		Transmission
Engine name (Engine family)	Production	Fuel system	Configuration	Horsepower	Torque	Transmission
Ford 429 V8 (Ford 385 series)	1969–1971	2-bbl carburetor	429 cu in (7.0 L) OHV V8	320 hp (239 kW)	460 lb⋅ft (624 N⋅m)	
Ford 429 V8 (Ford 385 series)	1969–1973	4-bbl carburetor	429 cu in (7.0 L) OHV V8	1969–1971: 360 hp (268 kW); 1972: 208 hp (155 kW); 1973: 198 hp (148 kW)	1969–1971: 480 lb⋅ft (651 N⋅m); 1972: 322 lb⋅ft (437 N⋅m); 1973: 320 lb⋅ft (434 N⋅m)	Ford C6 automatic (3-speed)
Lincoln 460 V8 (Ford 385 series)	1972–1978	4-bbl carburetor	460 cu in (7.5 L) OHV V8	1972: 224 hp (167 kW); 1973: 202 hp (151 kW); 1974: 198 hp (148 kW); 1975: 218 hp (163 kW); 1976: 202 hp (151 kW); 1977: 197 hp (147 kW); 1978: 202 hp (151 kW)	1972: 342 lb⋅ft (464 N⋅m); 1973: 330 lb⋅ft (447 N⋅m); 1974: 335 lb⋅ft (454 N⋅m); 1975: 369 lb⋅ft (500 N⋅m); 1976: 352 lb⋅ft (477 N⋅m); 1977: 353 lb⋅ft (479 N⋅m); 1978: 348 lb⋅ft (472 N⋅m)	Ford C6 automatic (3-speed)
Ford 400 V8 (Ford 335 series)	1975–1978	2-bbl carburetor	402 cu in (6.6 L) OHV V8	1975: 144 hp (107 kW); 1976: 180 hp (134 kW); 1977: 168 hp (125 kW); 1978: 160 hp (119 kW)	1975: 255 lb⋅ft (346 N⋅m); 1976: 338 lb⋅ft (458 N⋅m); 1977: 324 lb⋅ft (439 N⋅m); 1978: 319 lb⋅ft (433 N⋅m)	Ford FMX automatic (3-speed)
Ford 351M (Ford 335 series)	1978	2-bbl carburetor	351 cu in (5.8 L) OHV V8	145 hp (108 kW)	273 lb⋅ft (370 N⋅m)	Ford FMX automatic (3-speed)

=== Body design ===
The second-generation Marquis was expanded from the previous two-door hardtop to a full range of body styles, inheriting the four-door hardtop from the Brougham and four-door sedan and two-door convertible from the Park Lane series. Under the 1969 rebranding of Ford and Mercury station wagons, the Colony Park station wagon became part of the Marquis line.

For 1969 and 1970, the Mercury Marauder made its return, unofficially replacing the S-55. Designed as a competitor for the Oldsmobile Toronado and Buick Riviera, the Marauder was a fastback coupe combining the front bodywork of the Marquis with the roofline of the Ford XL/Ford Galaxie 500 SportsRoof.; along with the Colony Park, the Marauder was built on the 121-inch wheelbase used by Ford.

During its production, the second generation underwent two updates, including a 1971 mid-cycle revision of the exterior and interior. In 1973, to coincide with the addition with 5-mph bumpers, the exterior and interior underwent a complete redesign, with the two-door hardtop receiving a different roofline from the Ford LTD.

==== 1969–1972 ====
For 1969, the Mercury full-size range was redesigned (alongside its Ford counterparts); the Marquis remained a counterpart of the Ford LTD model range. Alongside the addition of four-door sedans, the Marquis line gained a station wagon, as the Colony Park woodgrained station wagon was integrated into the model line.

While the Marquis four-door shared much of its roofline with its Ford counterpart, the two-door hardtop was given its own roofline. The front fascia of the Marquis adopted many elements from the Lincoln Continental, including its hood and grille proportions and chrome-topped fenders; the Marquis, LTD/Galaxie/Custom, and Continental each received their own horizontal taillamp design. Initially sharing its hidden headlamps with the LTD, the usage of the design largely became exclusive to Lincoln-Mercury flagships after 1970, including the Marquis, Lincoln Continental, and Mark-series (the LTD Landau became the only Ford to use the configuration). The system was vacuum-operated, closing the headlight covers using a vacuum canister powered by the engine; as a fail-safe. the system was designed to retract the headlight covers following any vacuum loss.

For 1970, the Marquis saw few visible changes to the exterior and interior. In compliance with federal safety regulations, all full-size Mercurys received a new steering column, with a rim-blow steering wheel replacing the previous horn ring design. Alongside the woodgrained Colony Park, a Marquis station wagon (without wood paneling) was introduced.

For 1971, the Marquis underwent a revision of the exterior and interior; the convertible body style was dropped (along with the Marauder fastback). Distinguished by the elimination of vent windows and framed door glass (for sedans and station wagons), Mercury saw the introduction of the "pillared hardtop", a sedan combining a thin B-pillar and frameless door glass (to mimic the appearance of a pillarless design). The revision also included the use of fender skirts and wraparound taillamps. The dashboard underwent a redesign, clustering the instruments and controls closer to the steering wheel.

For 1972, the grille shifted to an egg-crate design (with a similar panel between the taillamps). In line with federal mandates, the Marquis adopted seatbelt warning buzzers. For the first time, the model line introduced a power sunroof option (requiring the selection of a vinyl roof).

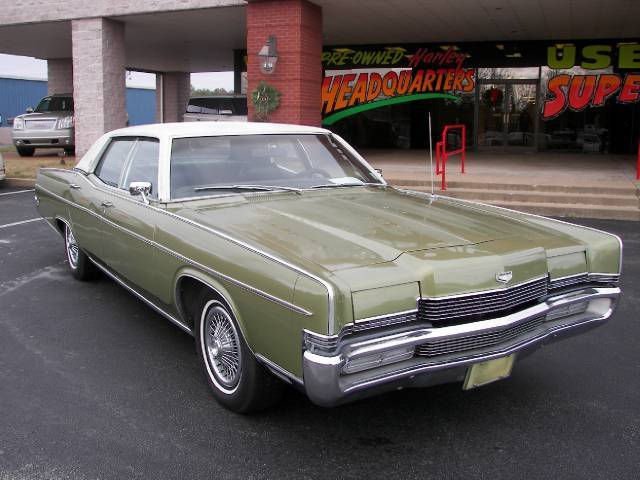
1969 Marquis sedan

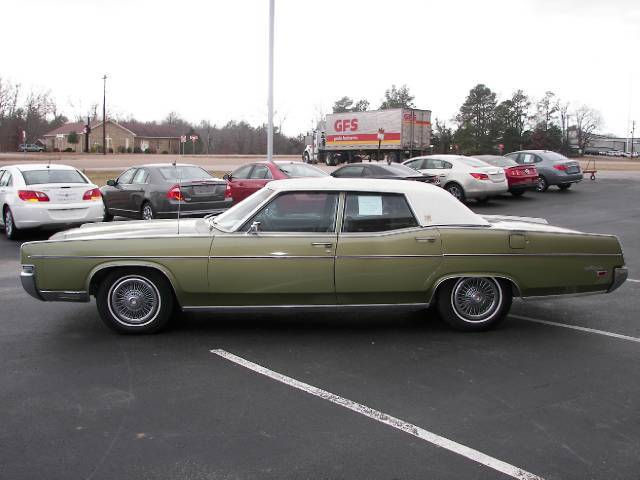
1969 Marquis sedan (side view)

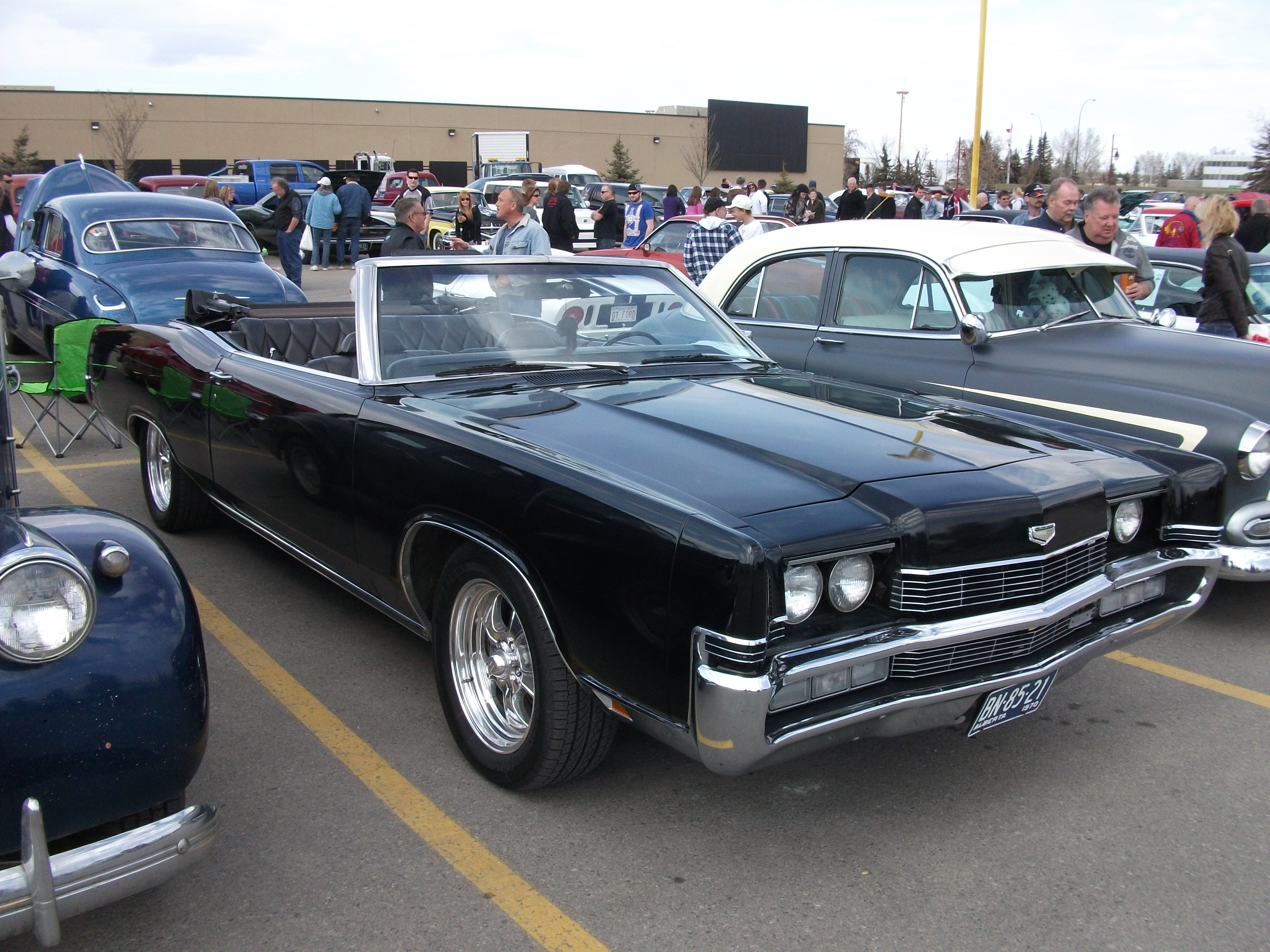
1970 Marquis Convertible (with non-standard wheels)

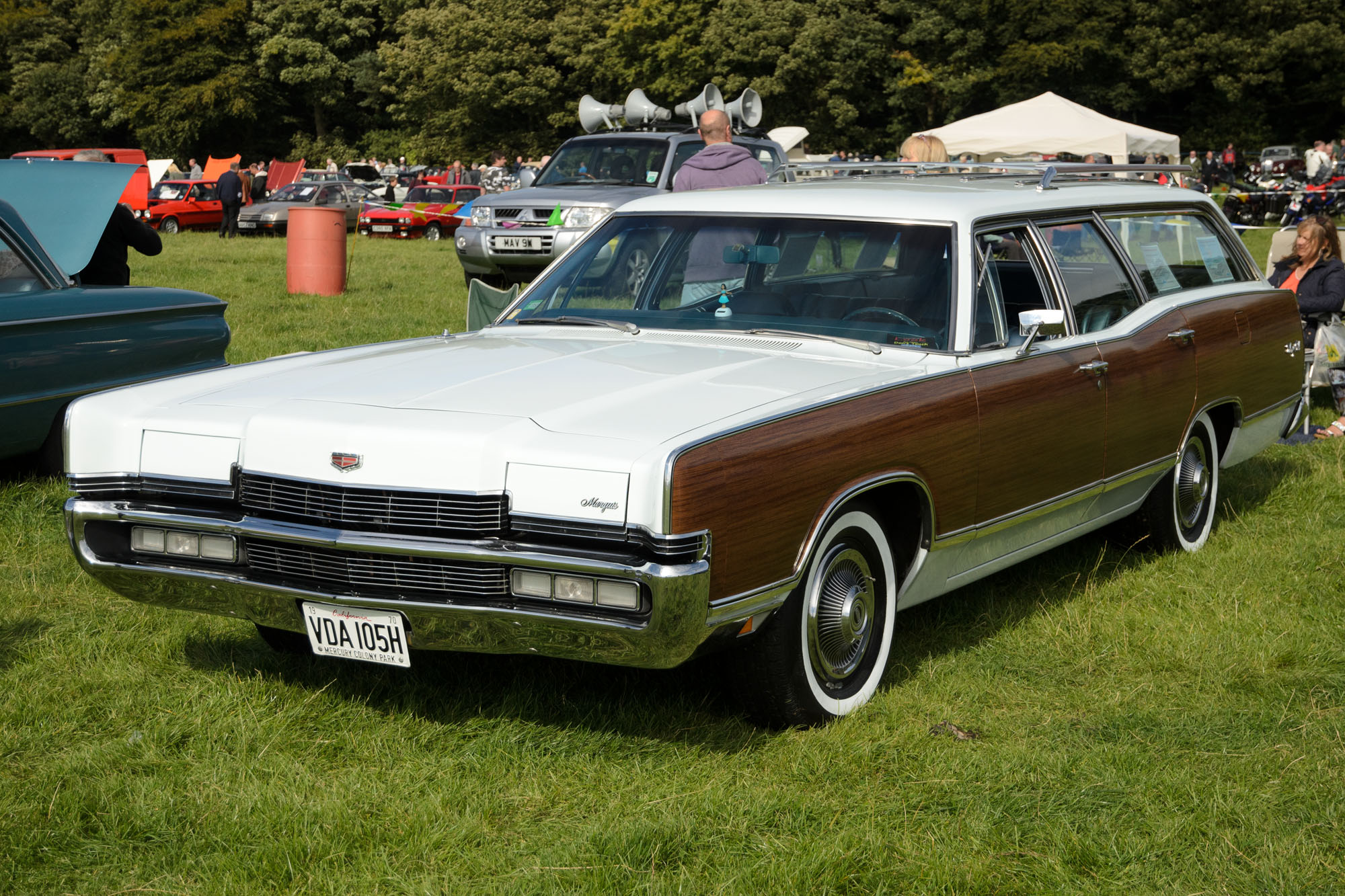
1970 Marquis Colony Park station wagon

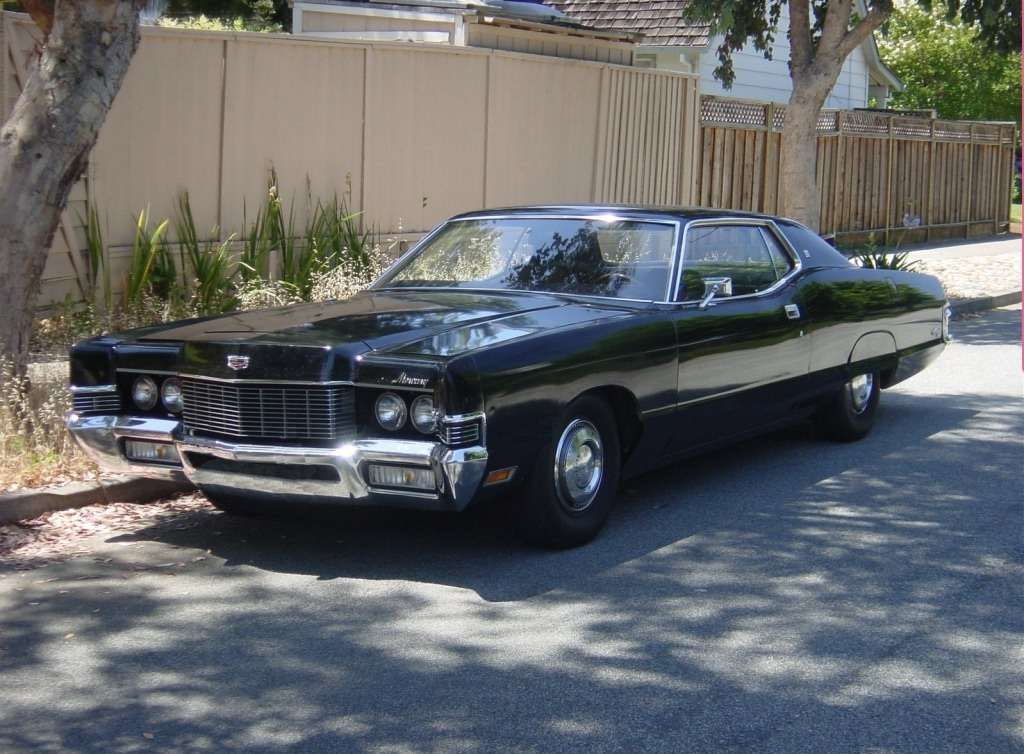
1971 Mercury Marquis 2-door hardtop

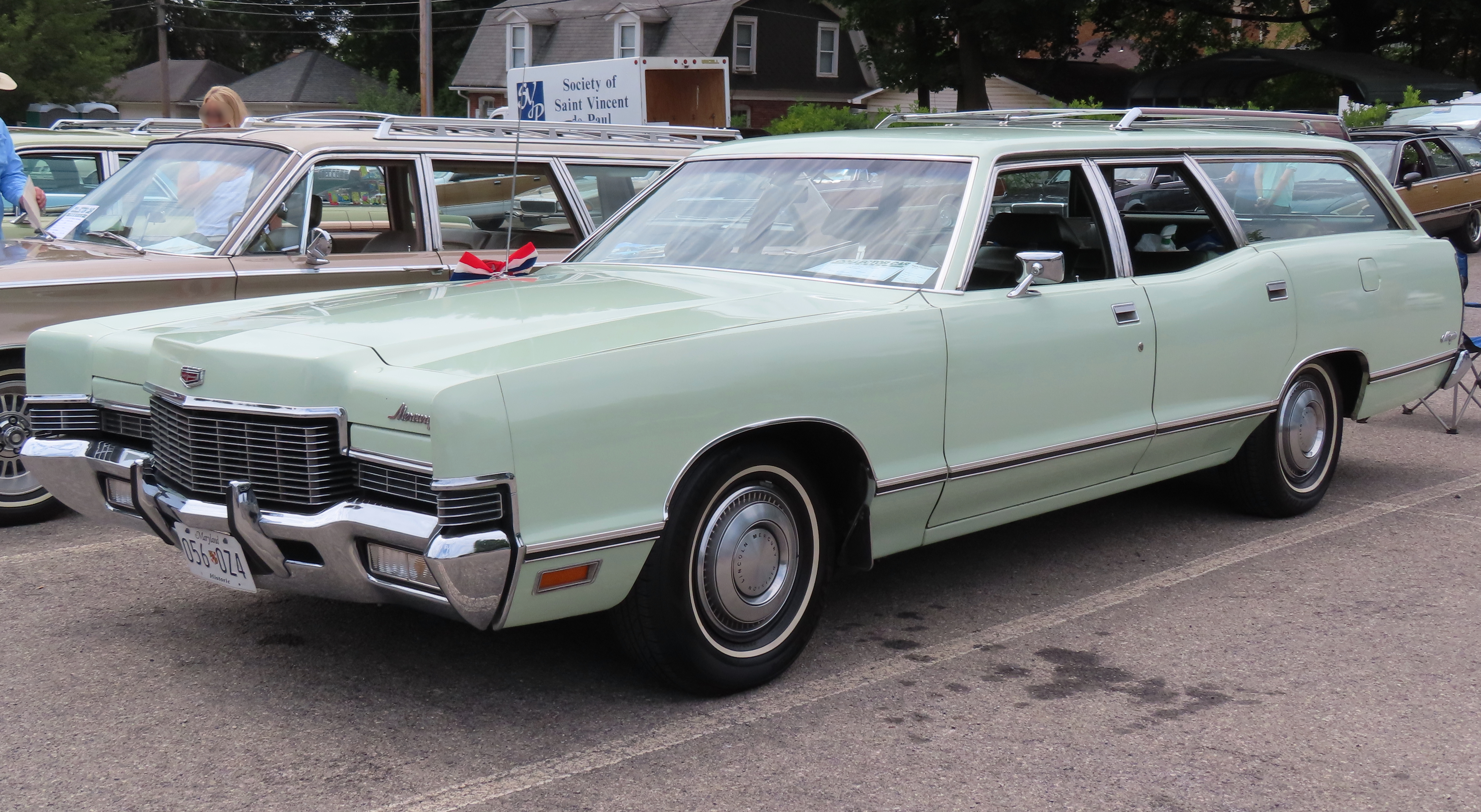
1971 Mercury Marquis station wagon

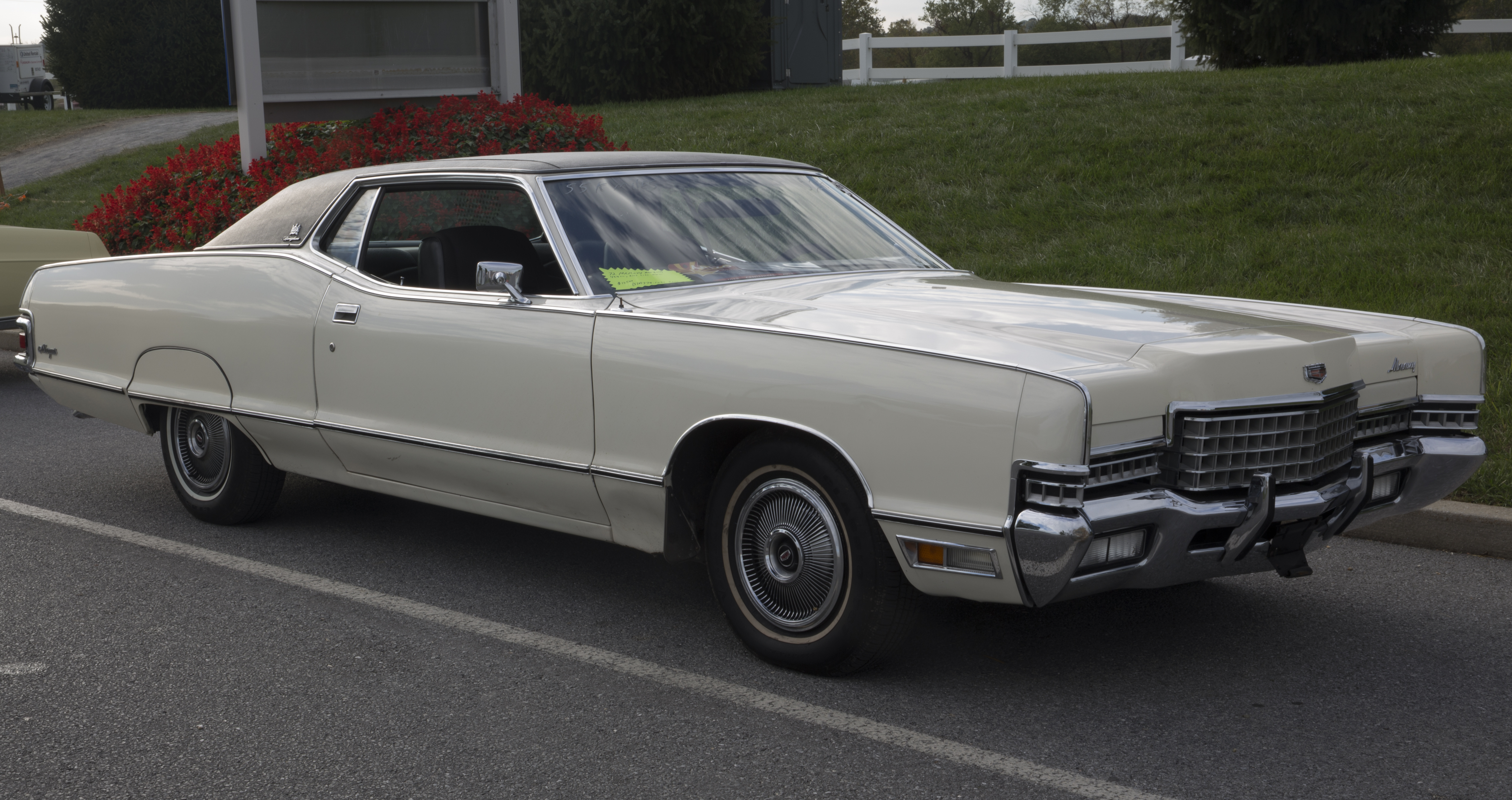
1972 Mercury Marquis Brougham 2-Door Hardtop

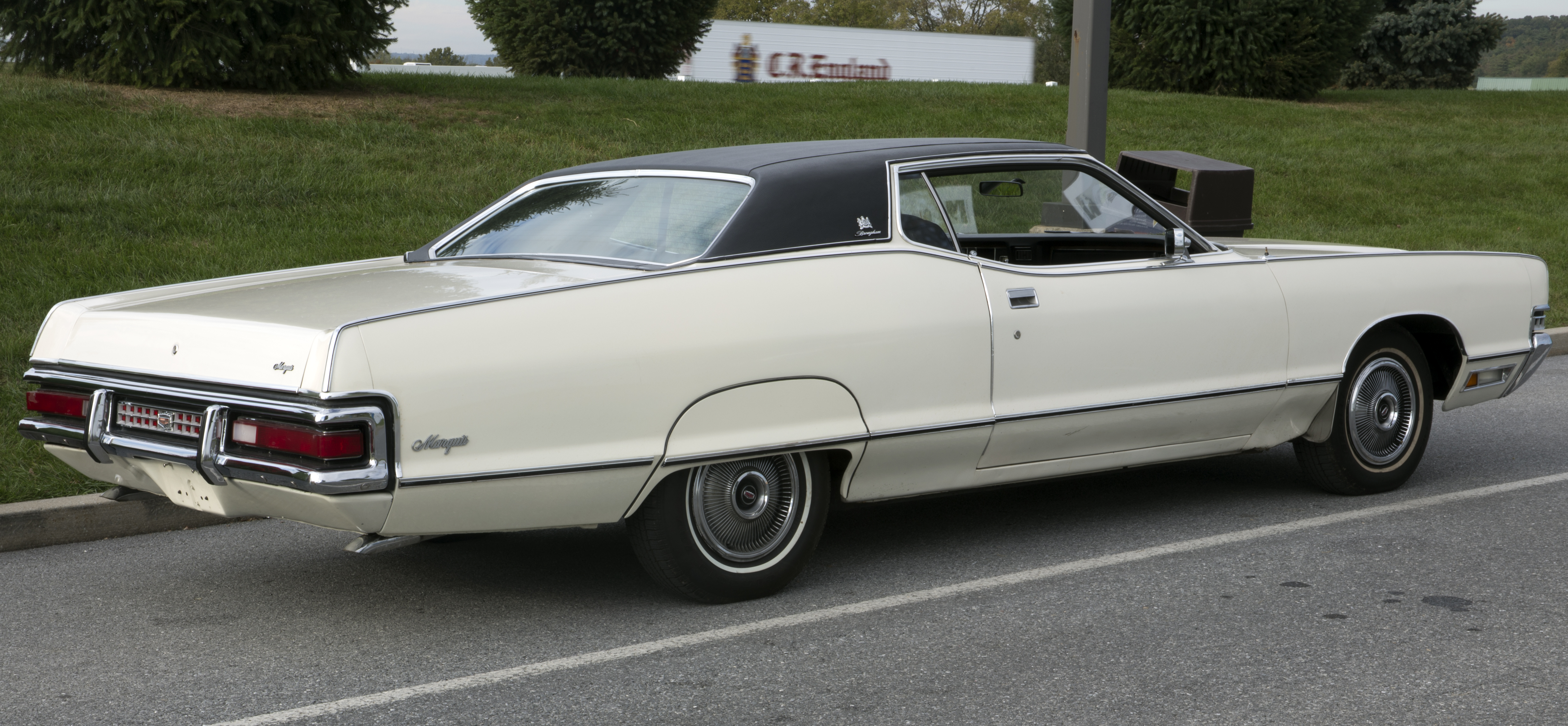
1972 Marquis Brougham two-door, rear view

==== 1973–1978 ====
For 1973, the Marquis underwent an extensive mid-cycle revision. Largely coinciding with the addition of 5-mph bumpers for the front and rear fascias, the roofline of the Marquis saw a complete redesign. Though distinguished further from the Lincoln Continental, the four-door Marquis shared its roofline with the Ford LTD; in contrast to the LTD, the two-door remained a hardtop with retractable side windows (enlarged for better visibility). Alongside the four-door hardtop, the four-door sedan and station wagon were marketed as "pillared hardtops" (produced with thin chromed B-pillars, allowing frameless door glass). The interior saw a revision of the trim and seats, with a redesign of the dashboard (clustering the instruments behind the steering wheel and the secondary controls to the center of the dashboard).

For 1974, the grille underwent a redesign (nearly matching that of the Lincoln Continental), shifting to a vertically-oriented layout and eliminating the egg-crate trim of the headlamp covers. Following their addition to the front fascia, the Marquis received 5-mph rear bumpers. In response to pending safety regulations, the four-door hardtop was offered for the last time.

For 1975, the front fascia saw several revisions, with a larger radiator-style grille (with the "Mercury" block lettering replaced by a script above the left headlamp); in contrast to the Ford LTD Landau and the Lincoln Continental, the headlamp doors were revised with chrome border trim and a crest emblem. The rear fascia received padded vinyl trim (body color or contrasting) between the taillamps. While Ford and Lincoln added B-pillars (and opera windows) to their two-door sedans, Mercury retained its hardtop roofline.

For 1976 though 1978, the Marquis saw few visible changes; in 1976, a Landau vinyl roof option was introduced for Brougham and Grand Marquis two-doors, while all versions of the Marquis were marketed as "Ride-Engineered" (promoting its successful ride comparisons against more expensive European sedans of the time). For 1978, the Marquis was given a redesigned grille, retaining a similar radiator-style design.

Alongside the 1978 Chrysler New Yorker two-door, the 1978 Mercury Marquis was the final pillarless two-door hardtop (with retractable rear side windows) offered by an American automobile manufacturer.

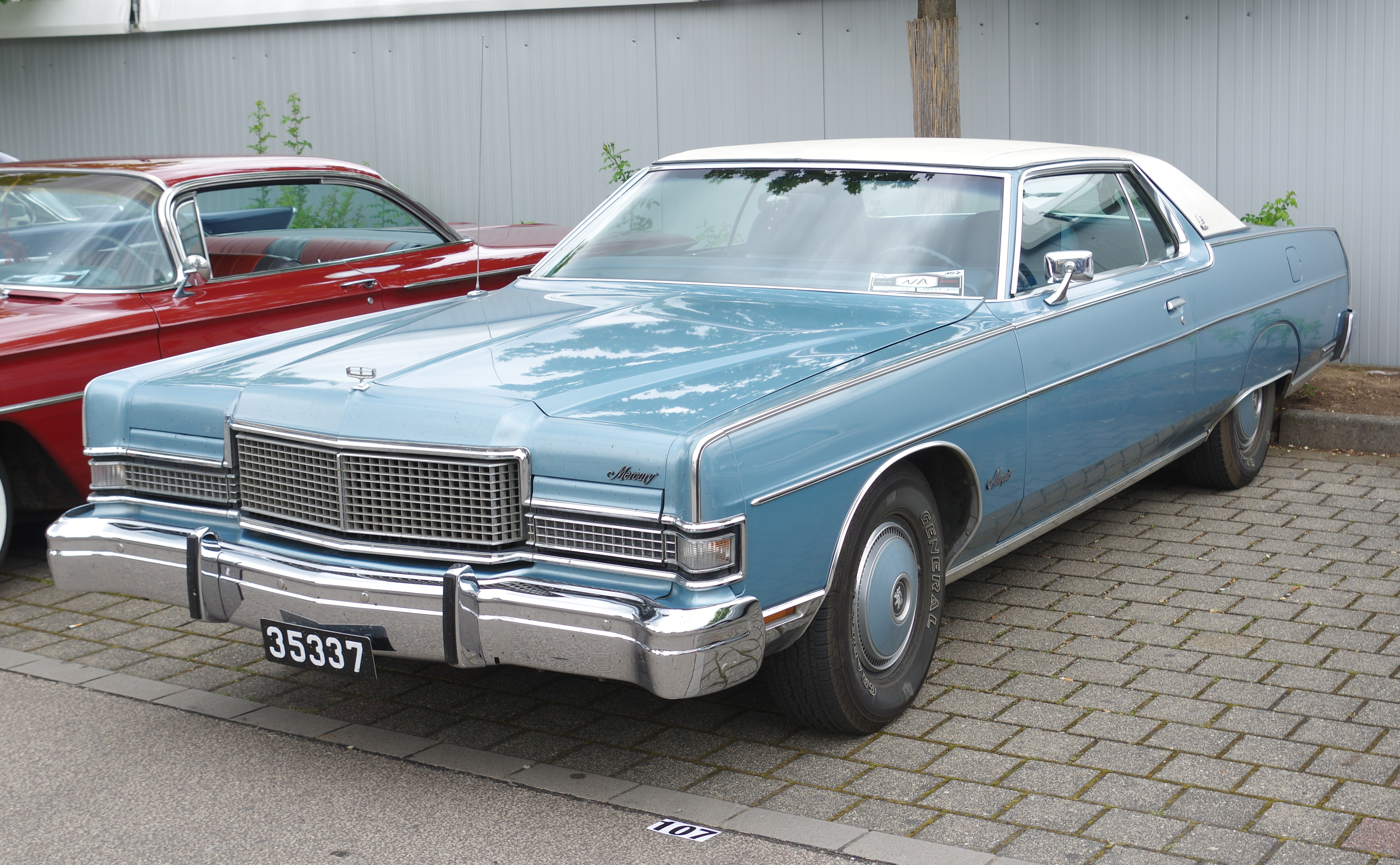
1973 Marquis 2-door hardtop

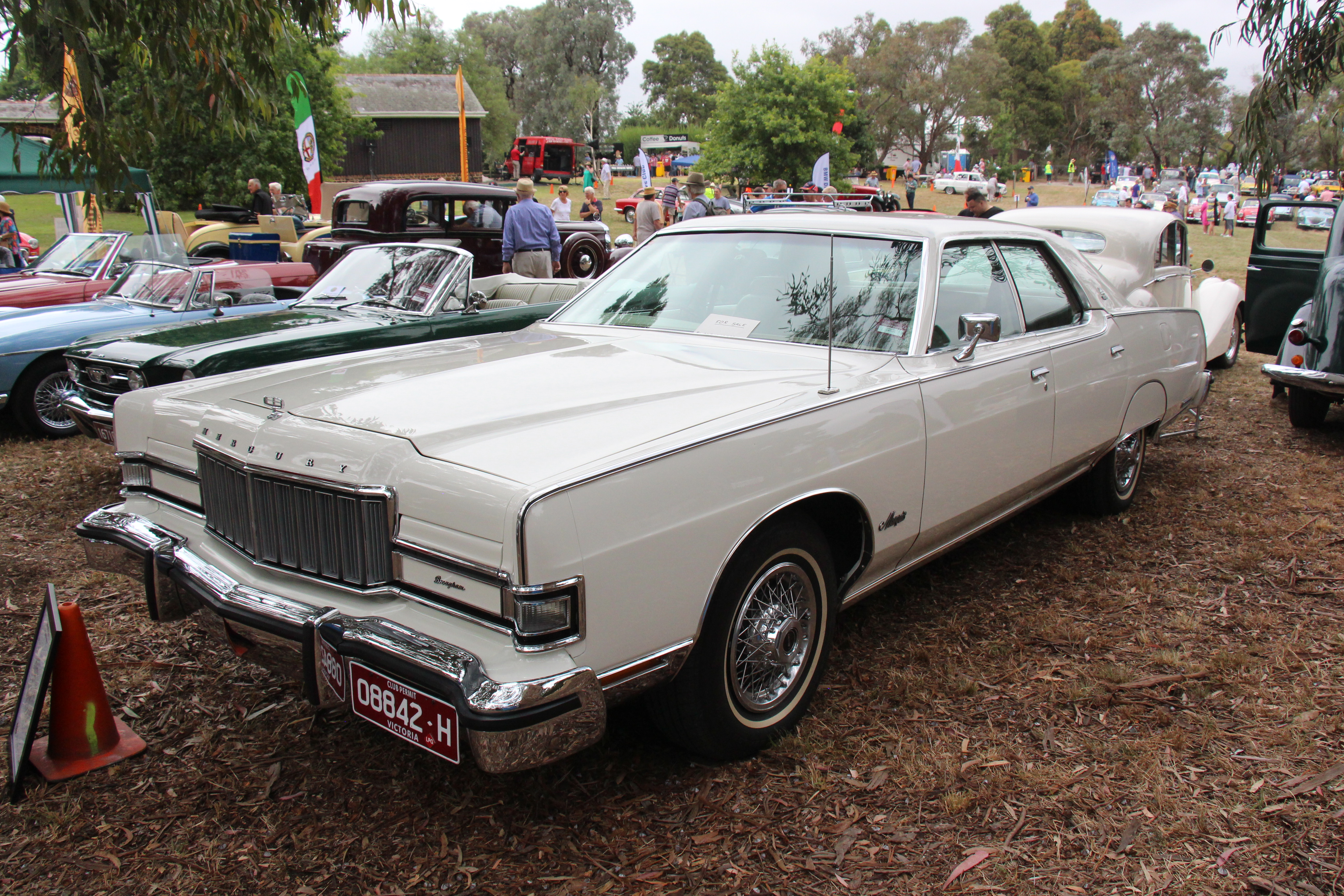
1974 Marquis Brougham 4-door pillared hardtop

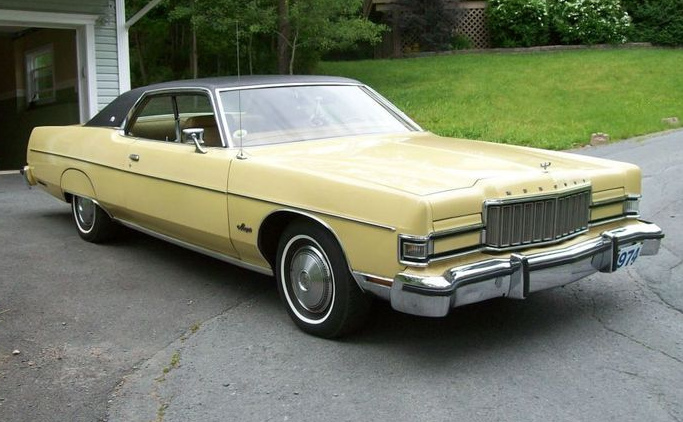
1974 Marquis Brougham 2-door hardtop

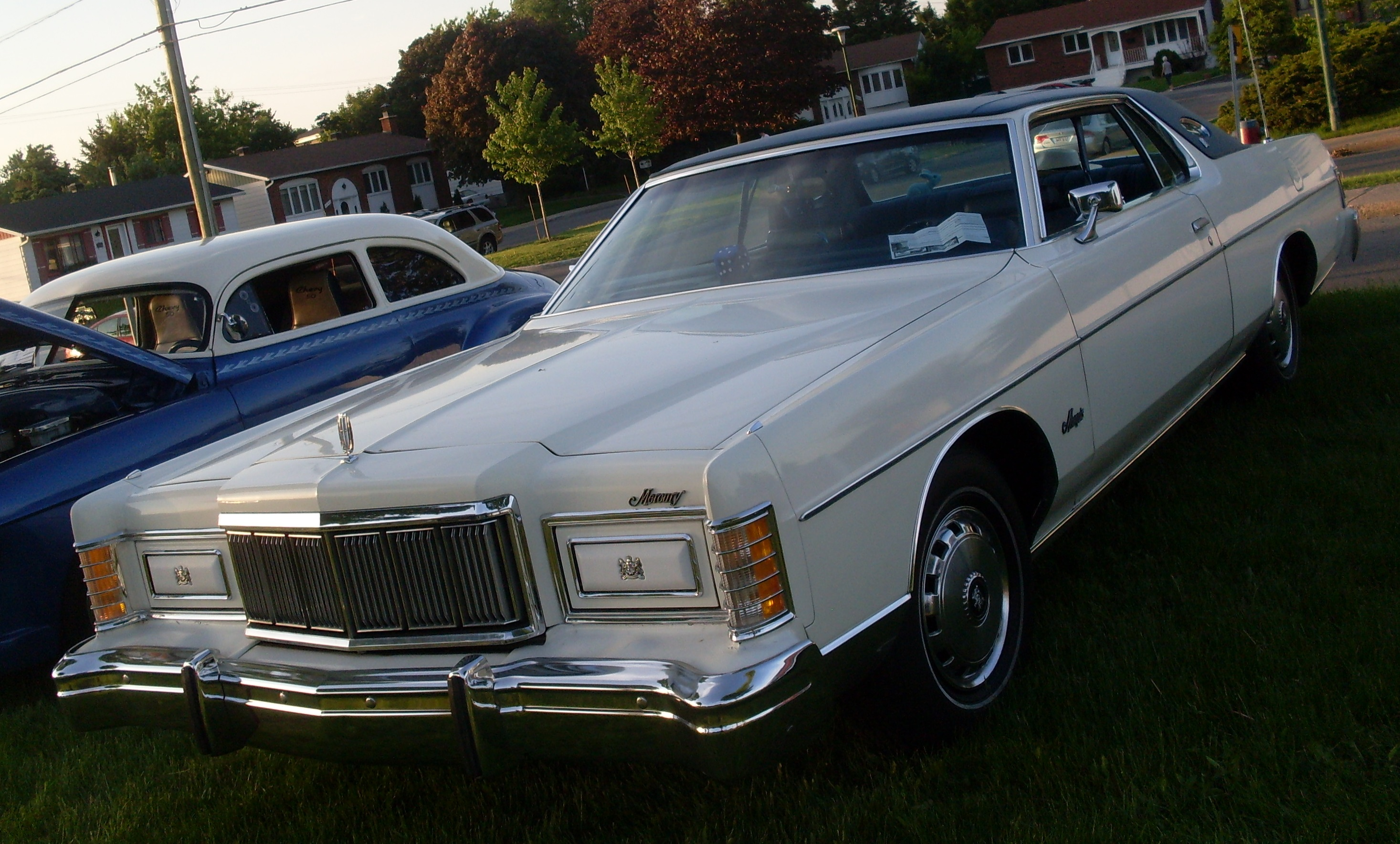
1975 Marquis 2-Door Hardtop

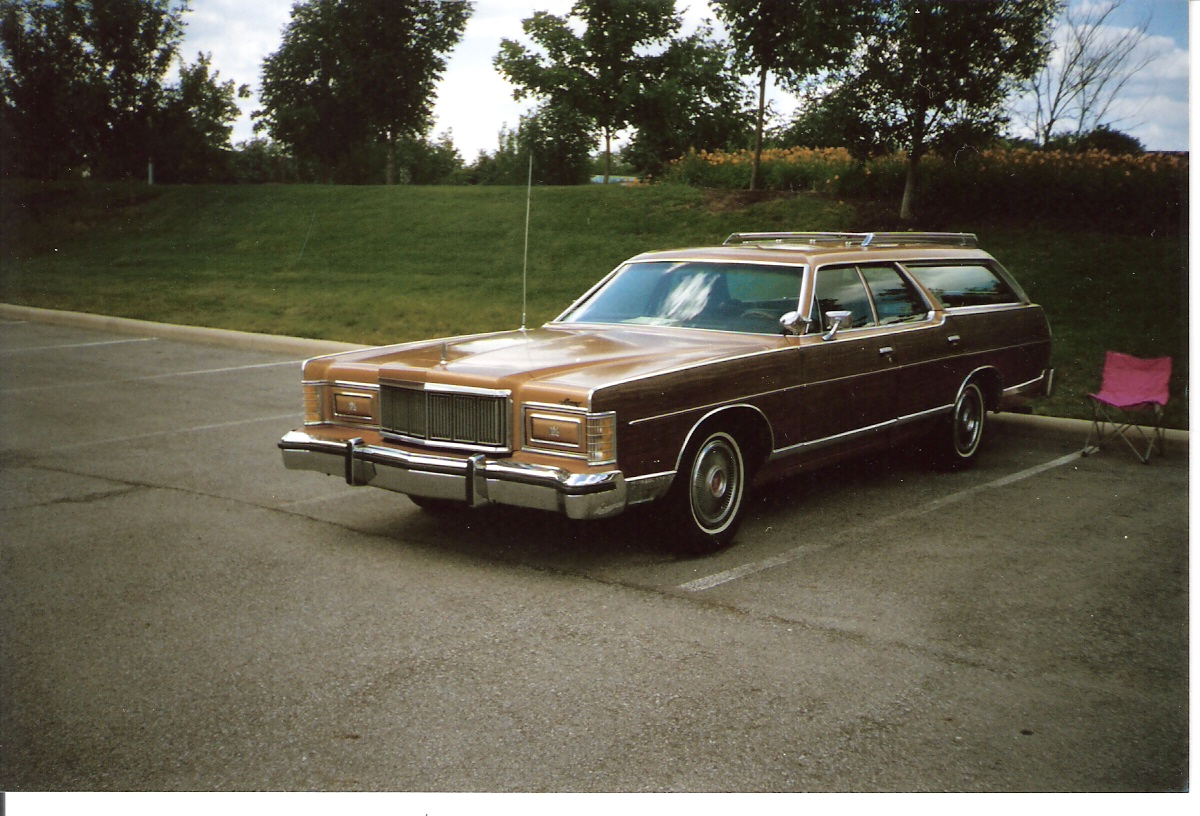
1976 Mercury Marquis Colony Park

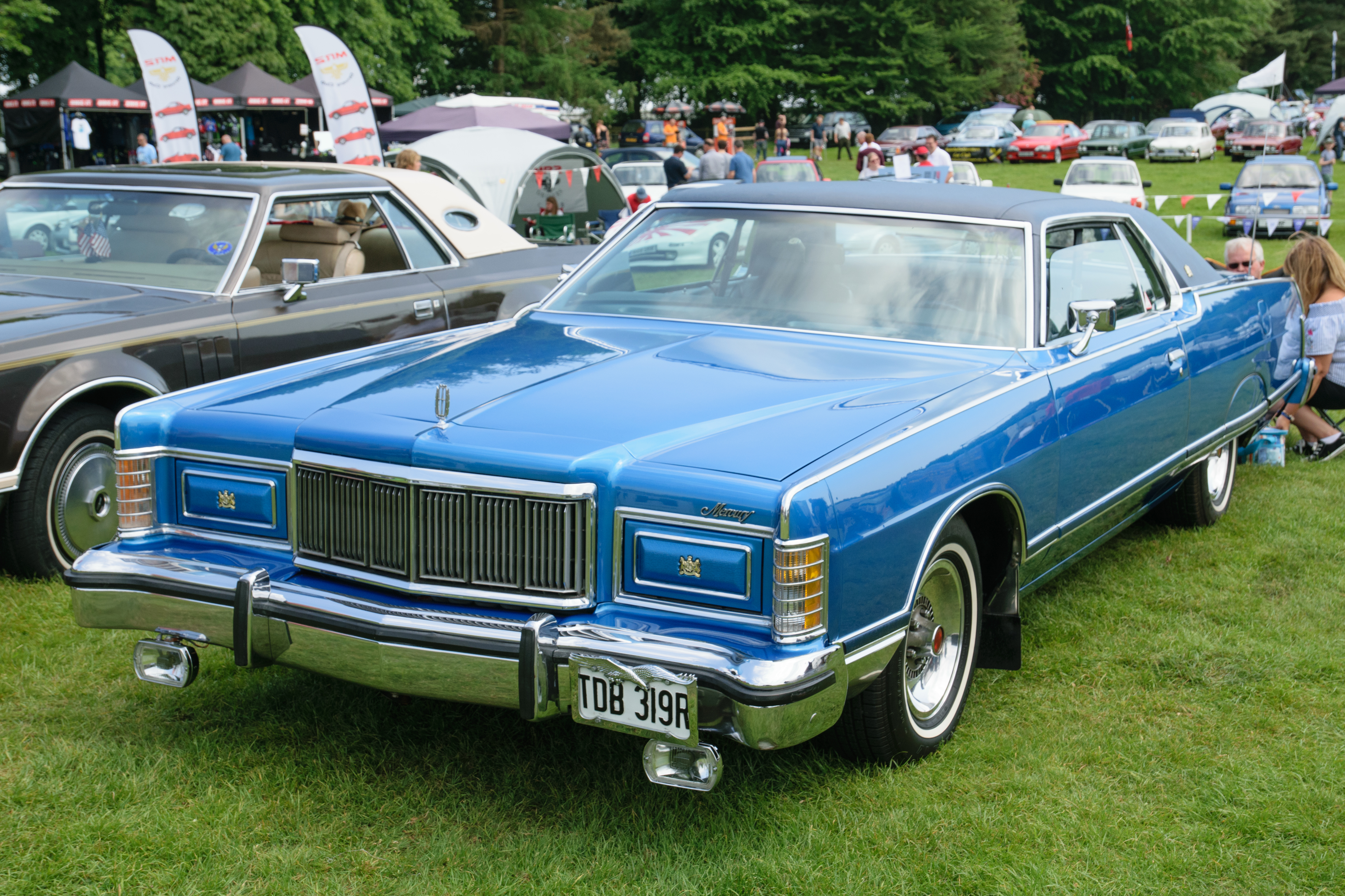
1977 Marquis Brougham 2-door hardtop

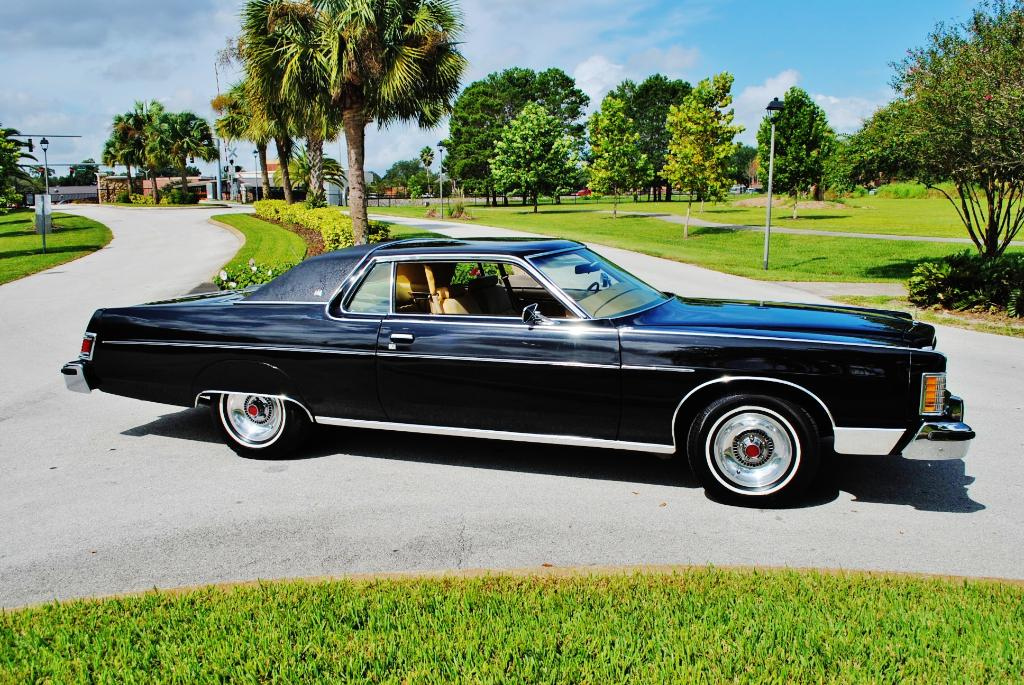
1978 Marquis Brougham two-door hardtop, side profile

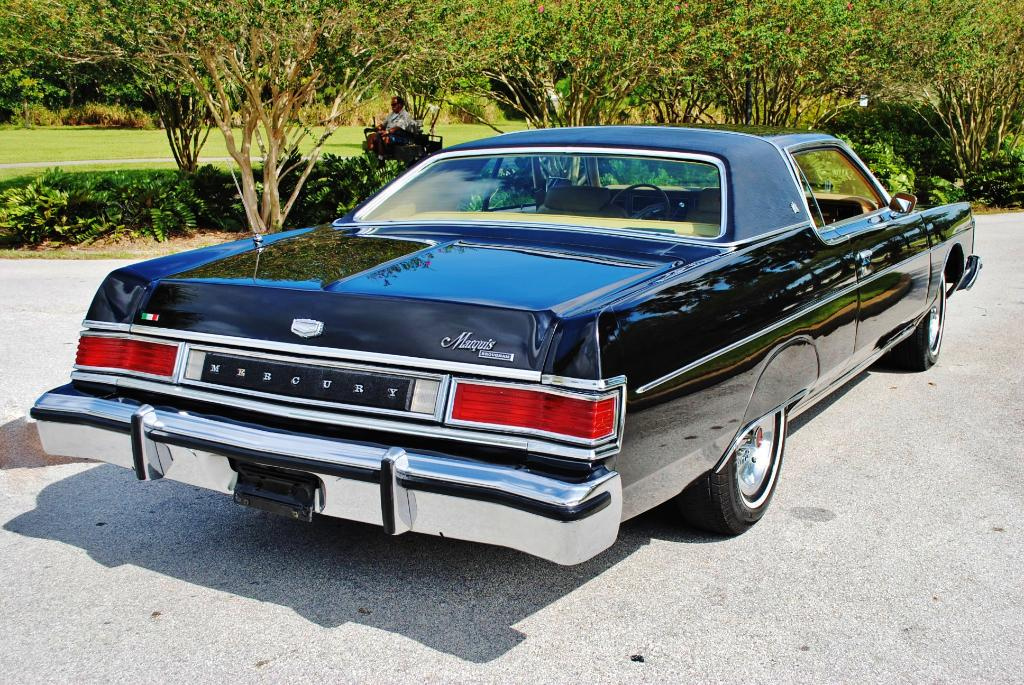
1978 Marquis Brougham two-door hardtop, rear view

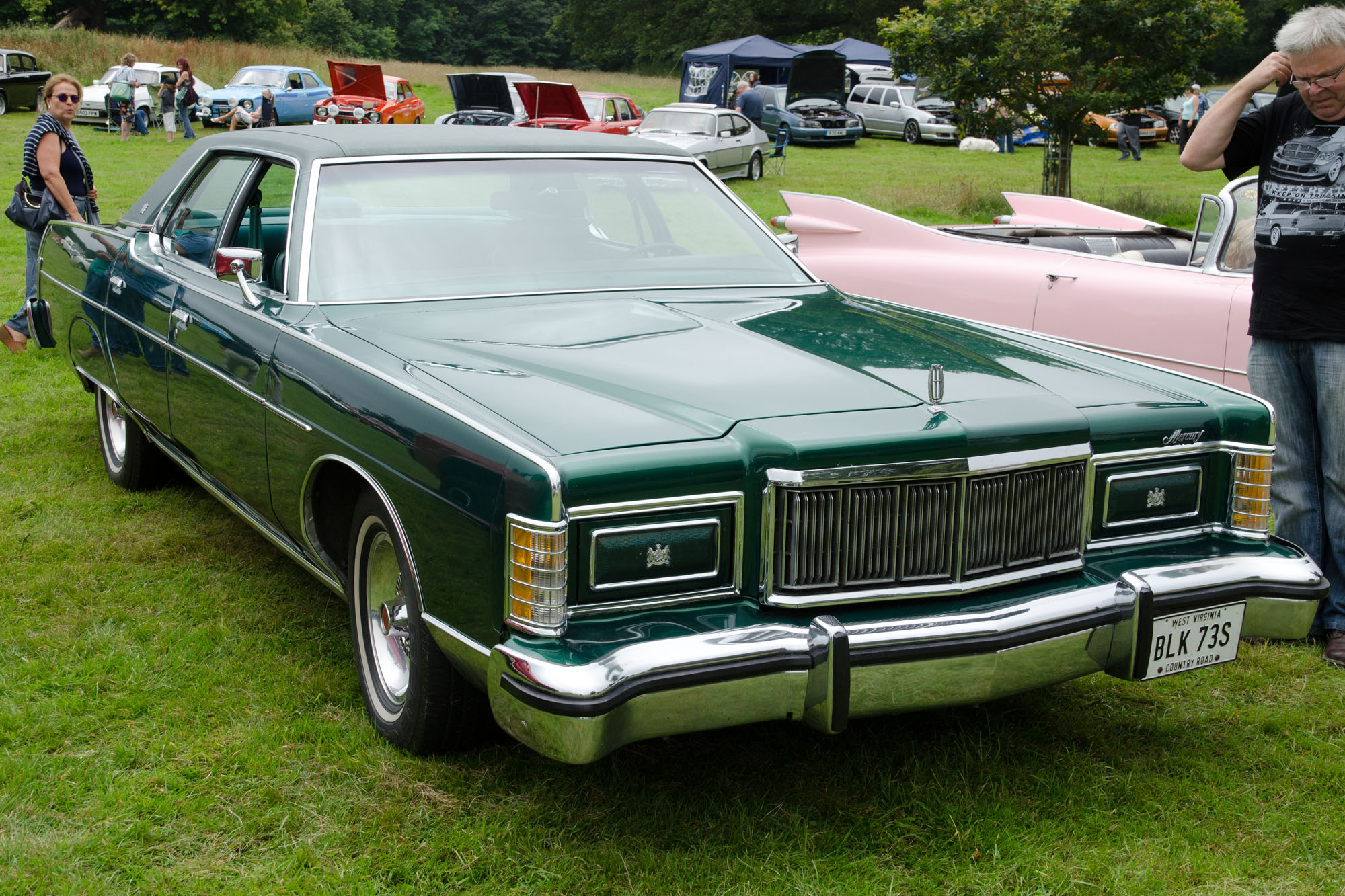
1978 Marquis Brougham four-door pillared hardtop

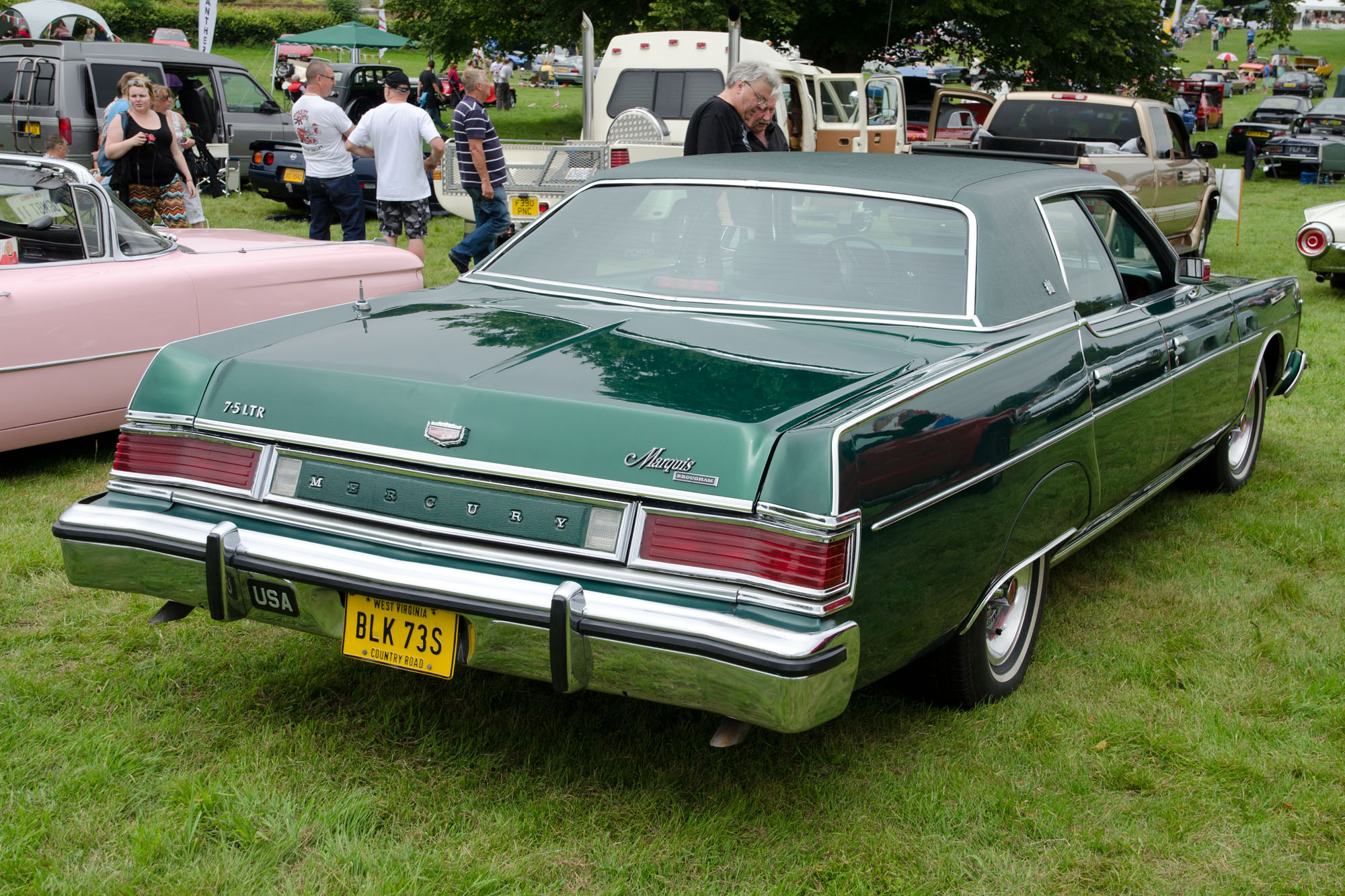
1978 Marquis Brougham four-door pillared hardtop, rear view

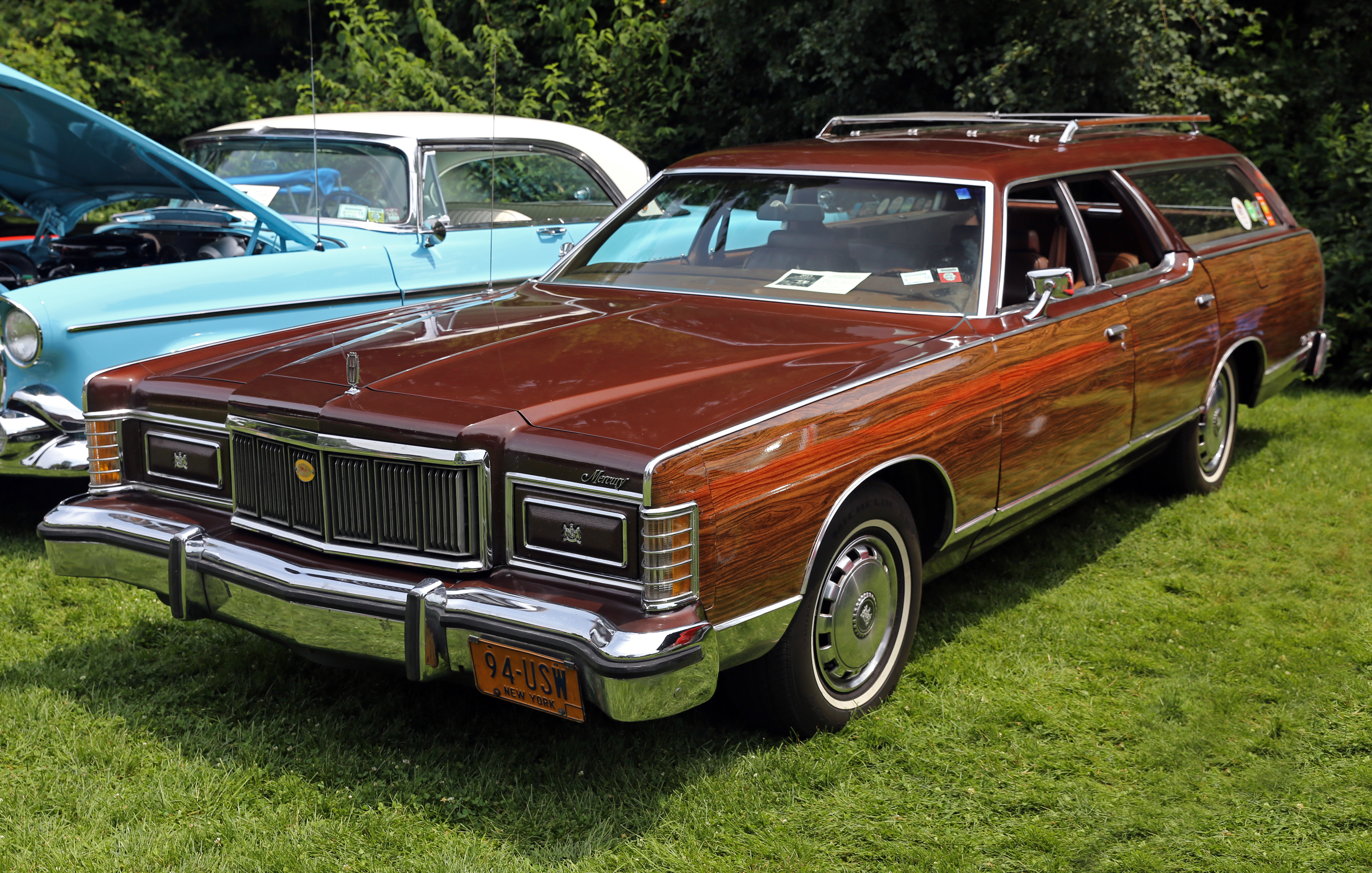
1978 Marquis Colony Park

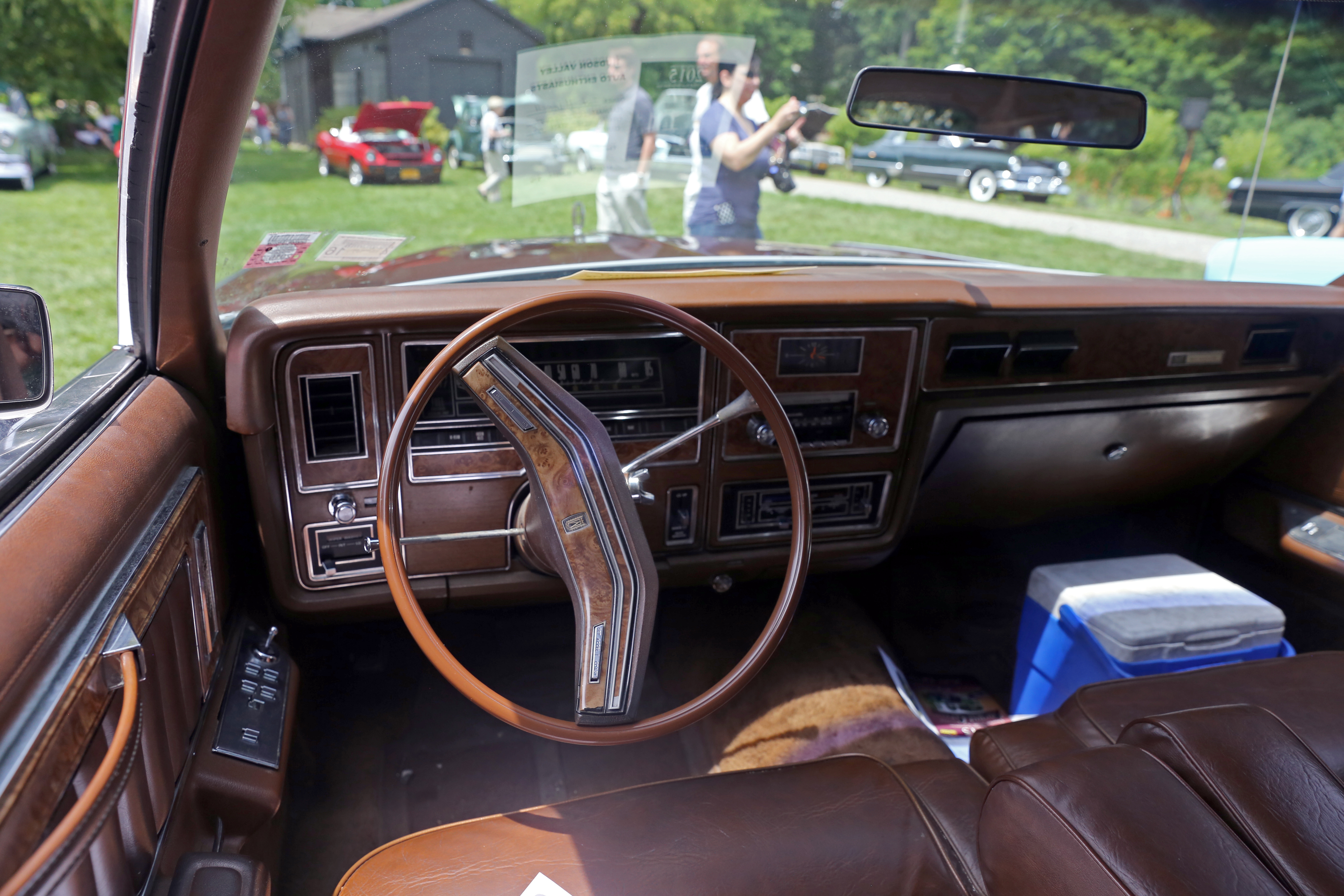
1978 Marquis Colony Park interior

=== Trim ===
In 1969, Mercury adopted the Brougham name from the Park Lane series, continuing its use as the highest Mercury trim line. Following the discontinuation of the Monterey after 1974, all full-size Mercury sedans took on the Marquis nameplate. Introduced as an interior option package for the Marquis Brougham in 1974, the Grand Marquis became a stand-alone trim line above the Brougham for 1975.

From 1969 to 1978, the Colony Park was included as part of the Marquis model range, with Mercury also offering a non-woodgrain Marquis station wagon.

== Third generation (1979–1982) ==
Third generation
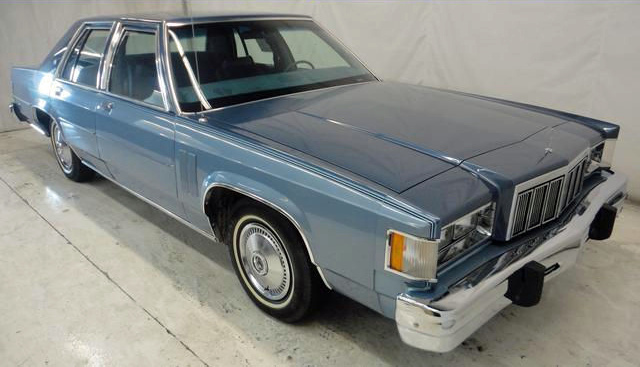
- 1980 Marquis 4-door sedan

Overview
- Model years: 1979–1982
- Assembly: Hazelwood, Missouri (St. Louis Assembly); Hapeville, Georgia (Atlanta Assembly)

Body and chassis
- Body style: 2-door sedan 4-door sedan 4-door station wagon
- Platform: Ford Panther platform
- Related: Continental Mark VI Mercury Grand Marquis; Mercury Colony Park; Ford LTD

Powertrain
- Engine: 255 cu in (4.2 L) Windsor V8; 302 cu in (4.9 L) Windsor V8; 351 cu in (5.8 L) Windsor V8
- Transmission: 3-speed C4/SelectShift automatic 4-speed AOD automatic

Dimensions
- Wheelbase: 114.3 in (2,903 mm)
- Length: 212.3 in (5,392 mm) (sedan); 217.7 in (5,530 mm) (wagon)
- Width: 77.5 in (1,968 mm) (sedan); 79.3 in (2,014 mm) (wagon)
- Height: 54.7 in (1,389 mm) (sedan); 56.8 in (1,443 mm) (wagon)
- Curb weight: 3,635–3,918 lb (1,649–1,777 kg)

For the 1979 model year, Mercury introduced the third-generation Marquis, marking the first ground-up redesign of the full-size range since 1969. Trading places with the Cougar as the longest Mercury vehicle, the Marquis shed 17 inches in length and over 1,000 pounds in curb weight (in comparison to its 1978 predecessor). For the first time since 1955, the full-size Mercury station wagon was produced with a curb weight under 4,000 pounds.

While downsizing of the Marquis resulted in an exterior footprint closer in size to the intermediate Cougar (prior to its downsizing for 1980), the model line saw an increase in overall interior space (through a taller roofline and redesigned seats); a significant increase in glass area contributed to improved outward visibility.

For 1983, Mercury rebranded its entire full-size line under the Grand Marquis nameplate; under minor revisions, the design was produced through the 1991 model year.

=== Chassis specifications ===
The third-generation Marquis is based upon the rear-wheel drive Ford Panther platform. An all-new design developed for the downsizing of full-size product ranges for all three Ford Motor Company divisions, the architecture is an evolution of the previous-generation chassis (introduced in 1969). For the first time in the history of the division, the full-size Mercury shared a common wheelbase with Ford, with both the Marquis and Ford LTD using a 114.3 in (2.90 m) wheelbase; reduced 9.7 in (25 cm) from the previous 124 in (3.15 m) (or 6.7 in (17 cm) from 121 in (3.07 m) for station wagons). For 1980, the Panther chassis was also adopted by Lincoln, introducing a downsized Lincoln Continental (Town Car from 1981) and the Continental Mark VI.

The Panther architecture underwent several design revisions over previous-generation designs. While the double-wishbone independent front suspension was largely unchanged, the live rear axle was changed from a 3-link to a 4-link layout (all four wheels were supported by coil springs). Due to cost considerations, the optional anti-lock brake system and four-wheel disc brakes were dropped in favor of upgraded front disc brakes; power brakes were standard.

==== Powertrain ====
The third-generation Marquis marked the introduction of a powertrain lineup completely new to the model line. In the interest of fuel economy, the 351M, 400, and 460 V8 engines were replaced by smaller-displacement engines shared with smaller vehicles within the Mercury line. In contrast with its Chrysler and General Motors competitors, the Marquis retained a V8 engine as standard equipment.

As Ford transitioned to metric engine displacement designations at the end of the 1970s, the standard engine for the Marquis was a 4.9 L V8 (the rebranded 302 V8, rounded up to 5.0 L to distinguish it from the 4.9 L I6); the Marquis shared this engine with the Cougar, Monarch, and Zephyr. The Marquis offered a 5.8 L V8 (the 351 V8 from the Cougar XR7) as an option.

For 1981, the engine line underwent a revision, with a 4.2 L V8 becoming the standard engine on the base-trim Marquis outside of California; the now-optional 5.0 L V8 was offered on Brougham-trim Marquis and Grand Marquis four-door sedans. For 1982, the 5.8 L V8 was dropped from the US-market Marquis, with sales continuing in Canada.

When introduced for 1979, both V8 engines were paired with a 3-speed SelectShift automatic. For 1980, the Marquis received the 4-speed AOD overdrive automatic transmission as standard equipment with the 4.2 L V8 and was offered as an option with the 5.0 L and 5.8 L engines. For 1982, the AOD became the sole transmission for all three engines.

Third-generation Mercury Marquis powertrain specifications
Engine name (Engine family)	Production	Configuration	Fuel system	Output		Transmission
Engine name (Engine family)	Production	Configuration	Fuel system	Horsepower	Torque	Transmission
Ford 4.2 L V8 (Windsor)	1981–1982	4.2 L (255 cu in) OHV V8	Motorcraft 7200VV 2-barrel carburetor	120 hp (89 kW) (1981) 122 hp (91 kW) (1982)	205 lb⋅ft (278 N⋅m) (1981) 209 lb⋅ft (283 N⋅m) (1982)	Ford 4-speed AOD automatic
Ford 5.0 L V8 (Windsor)	1979–1982	4.9 L (302 cu in) OHV V8	Motorcraft 7200VV 2-barrel carburetor Throttle-body fuel injection (1981)	129 hp (96 kW) (1979) 130 hp (97 kW) (1980–1981) 132 hp (98 kW) (1982)	223 lb⋅ft (302 N⋅m) (1979) 230 lb⋅ft (312 N⋅m) (1980) 235 lb⋅ft (319 N⋅m) (1981 2-bbl) 230 lb⋅ft (312 N⋅m) (1981 EFI) 236 lb⋅ft (320 N⋅m) (1982)	Ford 3-speed C4 (SelectShift) automatic Ford 4-speed AOD automatic
Ford 5.8 L V8 (Windsor)	1979–1981	5.8 L (351 cu in) OHV V8	Motorcraft 7200VV 2-barrel carburetor	138 hp (103 kW) (1979) 140 hp (104 kW) (1980) 145 hp (108 kW) (1981)	260 lb⋅ft (353 N⋅m) (1979) 265 lb⋅ft (359 N⋅m) (1980) 270 lb⋅ft (366 N⋅m) (1981)	Ford 3-speed FMX automatic Ford 4-speed AOD automatic
Ford 5.8 L HO V8 (Windsor) (Note: HO engine used for police-use vehicles only)	1981–1982	5.8 L (351 cu in) OHV V8	Motorcraft 7200VV 2-barrel carburetor	165 hp (123 kW)	285 lb⋅ft (386 N⋅m)	Ford 4-speed AOD automatic

=== Body design ===
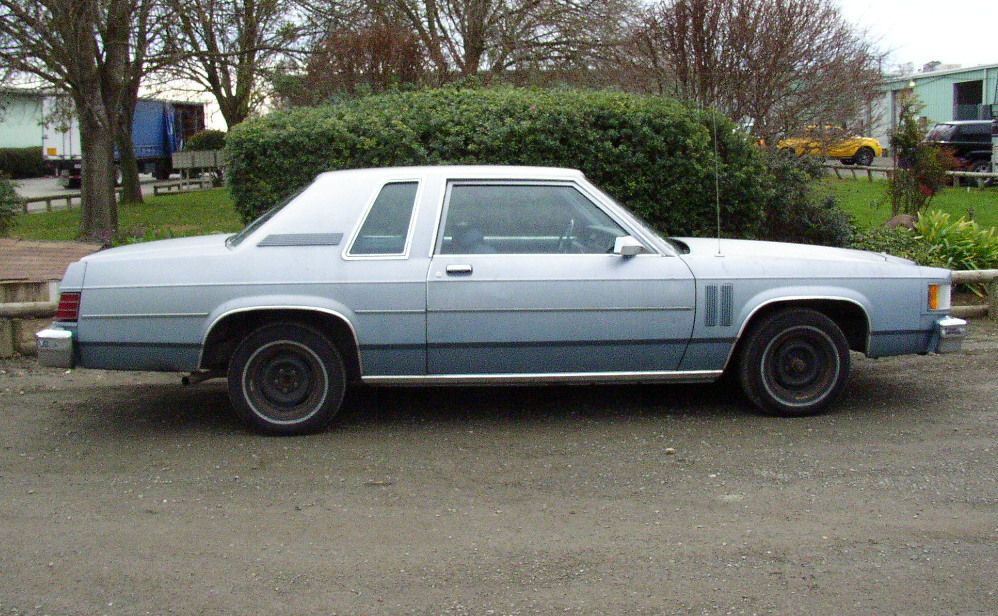
1979 Mercury Marquis 2-door sedan

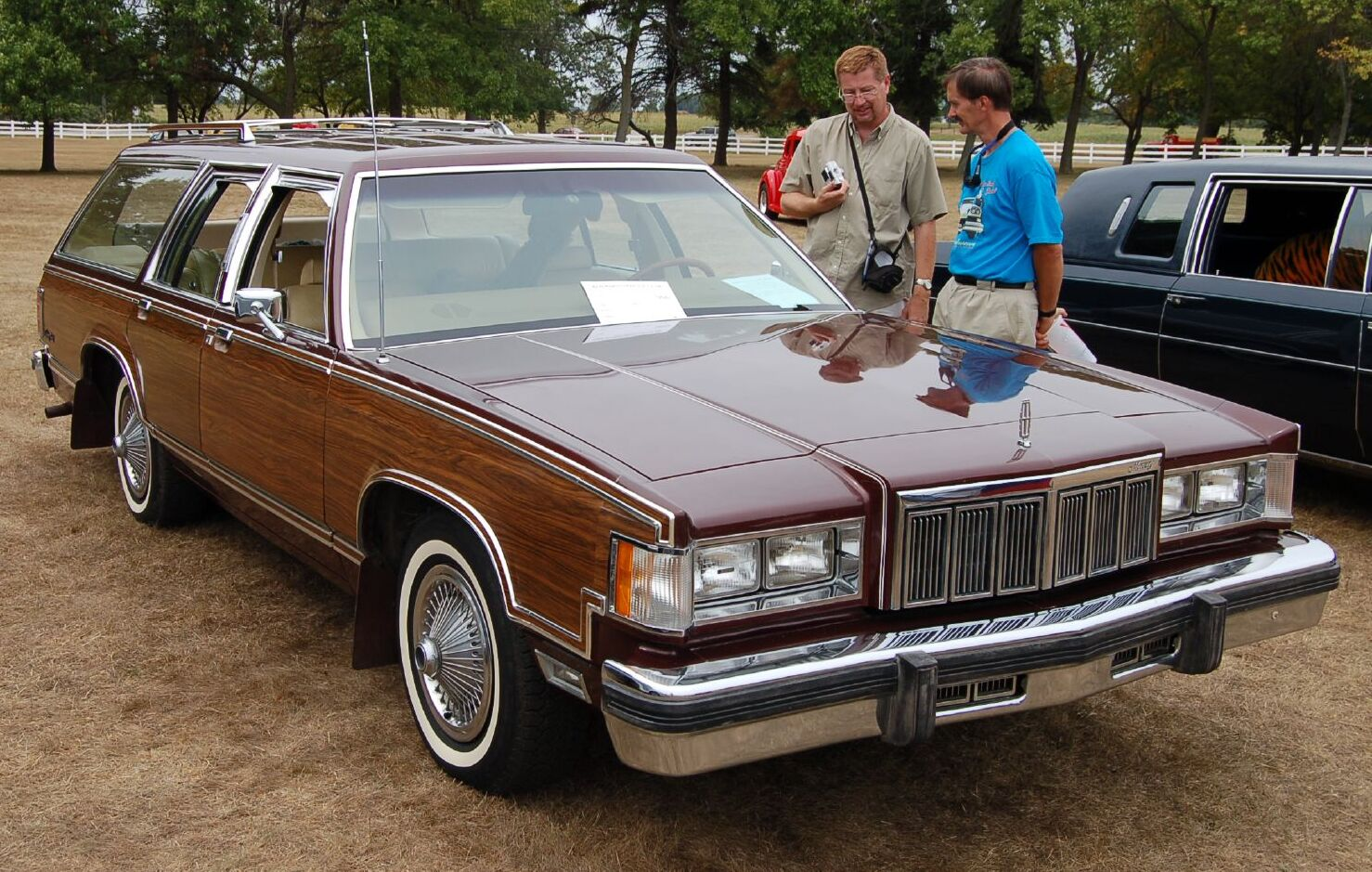
1981 Mercury Marquis Colony Park Wagon

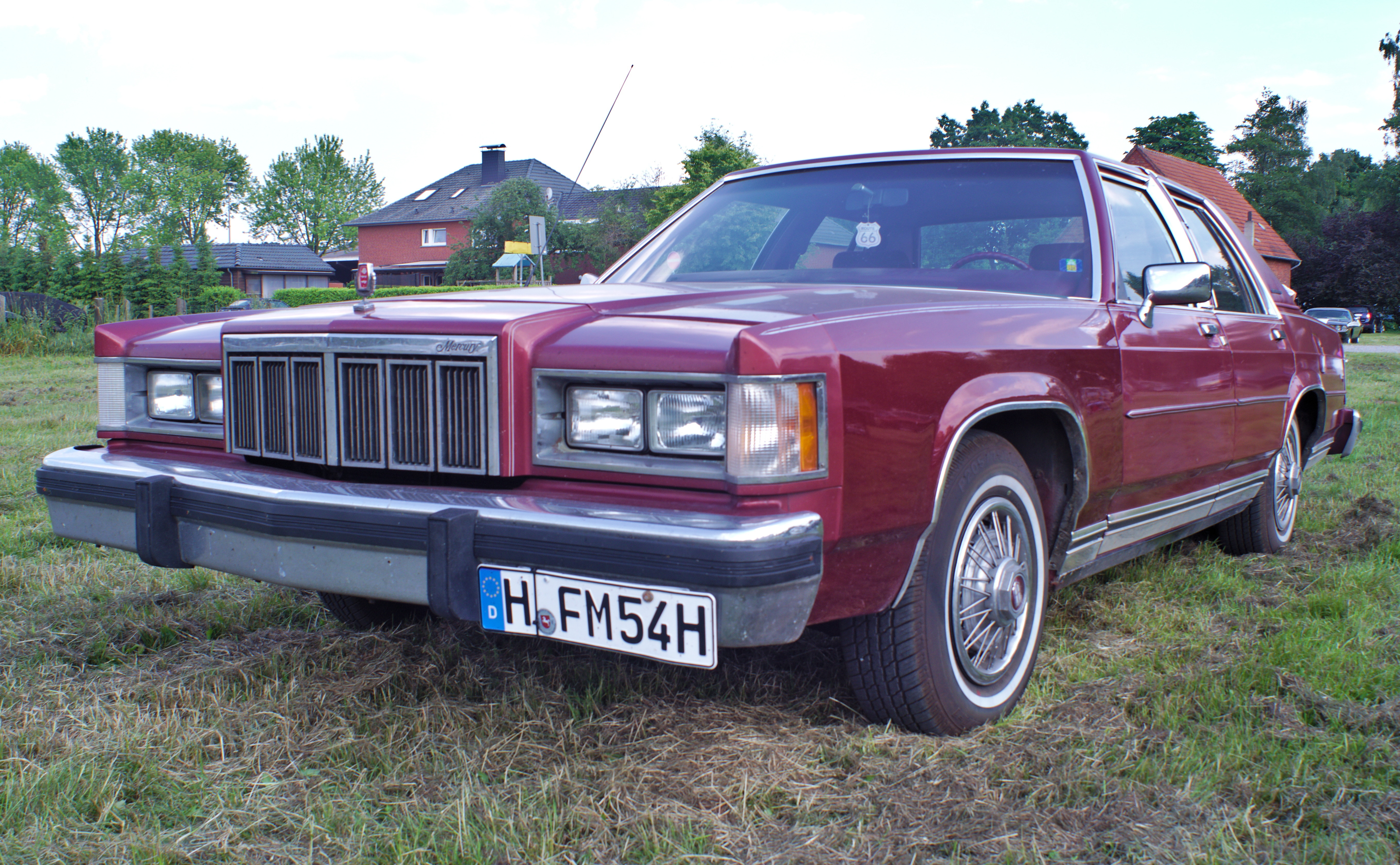
1982 Mercury Grand Marquis

In conjunction with its downsizing, the 1979 redesign of the Ford and Mercury full-size lines transitioned towards increased parts commonality between the Mercury Marquis and its Ford LTD divisional counterpart. Along with sharing a common wheelbase, the two model lines shared nearly their entire bodyshell; many non-visible components were shared with the Lincoln Continental/Town Car and Continental Mark VI. The Marquis was offered in a two-door sedan (replacing the previous hardtop), four-door sedan (replacing the pillared hardtop sedan), and five-door station wagon (as a wood-trim Colony Park or body-color Marquis wagon); each body style used its own door design.

Though sharing the same body as its Ford counterpart, the Marquis was externally distinguished by several styling elements carried over from the previous generation. While the LTD was styled with an egg-crate grille design, the Marquis received a vertically-oriented grille (similar to the 1978 Marquis and the 1980 Cougar XR7). The front parking lamps were styled similar to the 1975–1978 Marquis (hidden headlamps were abandoned in favor of quad rectangular headlamps); full-width taillamps (in contrast to the square taillamps of the LTD) returned, now bordering the license plate (relocated from the rear bumper). Instead of the rear vinyl roof used on LTD four-doors, the Marquis four-door was styled with a full-length vinyl roof (standard on all but base-trim examples, where it was an option). Similar to the Mark V and Mark VI, the Marquis was styled with non-functional) fender louvers behind the front wheels (and vents in the front bumper). For 1981, the vents were removed from the front bumper (for 1982, they were deleted from the fenders).

Alongside trim and badging details, the full-size Ford and Mercury sedan interiors were styled with their own dashboard designs; the previous two-spoke steering wheel was replaced by a four-spoke design. While the LTD received a horizontal full-width speedometer, the Marquis received two square pods for the instrument panel (with white-face instrument bezels). For 1982, a digital trip computer was introduced as an option (replacing the analog clock in the dashboard).

=== Trim ===
The third-generation Marquis carried over its trim nomenclature from the previous generation. Alongside the standard Marquis, Mercury also sold the Marquis Brougham and the top-trim Grand Marquis. The woodgrain-trim Colony Park was trimmed as either a Marquis or a Grand Marquis (dependent on options).

In Canada, the Marquis Meteor continued as the base trim through 1981 (marking the final use of the Meteor nameplate by Ford). From 1981 to 1982, Mercury offered a police-use version of the Marquis, derived from the standard trim four-door sedan. Along with its Ford LTD counterpart, police-use versions of the Marquis were fitted with a model-specific speedometer and a 165-hp version of the 5.8 L V8.

=== Production figures ===
Mercury Marquis Production Figures
	Coupe	Sedan	Wagon	Yearly Total
1979	20,662	56,971	13,758	91,391
1980	4,874	21,837	8,188	34,899
1981	2,942	22,136	8,512	33,590
1982	2,833	24,766	10,491	38,090
Total	31,311	125,710	40,949	197,970

== Fourth generation (1983–1986) ==
Fourth generation
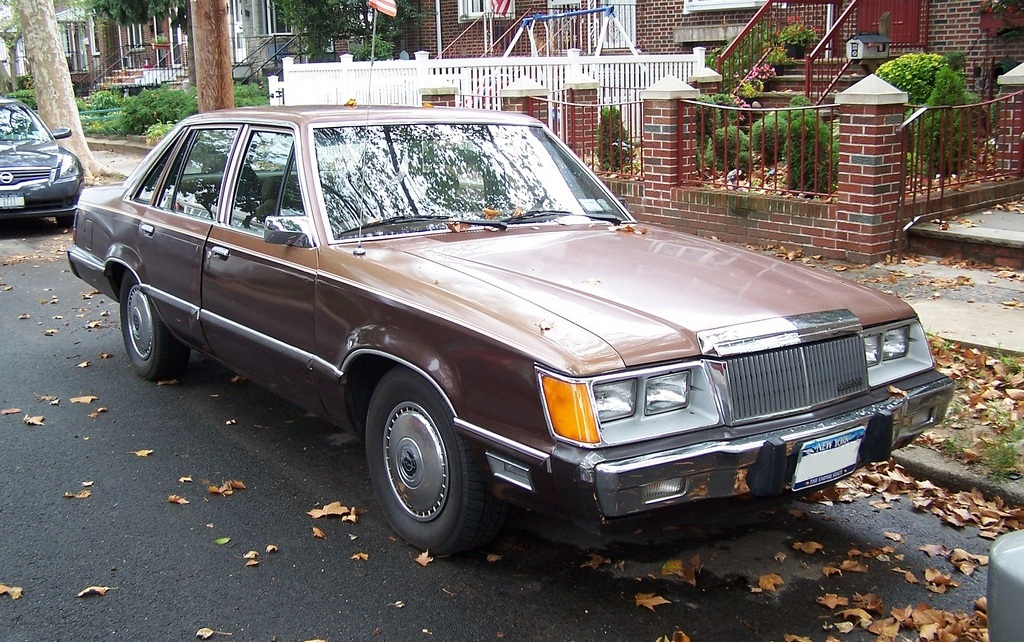
- 1983 Mercury Marquis 4-door sedan

Overview
- Also called: Ford Cougar (Venezuela)
- Model years: 1983–1986
- Assembly: Chicago, Illinois (Chicago Assembly); Hapeville, Georgia (Atlanta Assembly)

Body and chassis
- Class: Mid-size
- Body style: 4-door sedan 5-door station wagon
- Platform: Ford Fox platform
- Related: Mercury Cougar; Ford LTD; Ford Thunderbird; Lincoln Continental; Lincoln Continental Mark VII

Powertrain
- Engine: 2.3 L (140 cu in) Lima I4; 3.3 L (200 cu in) Mileage Maker I6; 3.8 L (232 cu in) Essex V6; 4.9 L (302 cu in) 5.0L Windsor V8
- Transmission: 3-speed C5 automatic 4-speed AOD automatic

Dimensions
- Wheelbase: 105.6 in (2,682 mm)
- Length: 196.5 in (4,991 mm)
- Width: 71.0 in (1,803 mm)
- Height: 53.8 in (1,367 mm) (sedan); 54.4 in (1,382 mm) (wagon)
- Curb weight: 3,001 lb (1,361 kg) (sedan); 3,108 lb (1,410 kg) (wagon)

Chronology
- Predecessor: Mercury Cougar
- Successor: Mercury Sable

For 1983, the fourth-generation Marquis was introduced as Mercury shifted the nameplate to the midsize segment to replace the slow-selling Cougar sedan and station wagon. Within Mercury, the Cougar XR-7 was replaced by a redesigned two-door Cougar, with all full-size Mercury sedans adopting the Grand Marquis nameplate.

Effectively downsizing the model range for a second time, the 1983 Marquis shed nearly 9 inches in wheelbase, nearly 16 inches in length, and up to 900 pounds of curb weight (dependent on powertrain and bodystyle). As with previous generations, the fourth-generation Marquis was the Mercury counterpart of the Ford LTD (in 1983, rebranded to replace the Granada).

Coinciding with the design change, production of the model line shifted from St. Louis Assembly to Chicago Assembly (Atlanta Assembly adopted production of the fourth-generation Marquis). Ford Venezuela marketed the Mercury Marquis (under slight trim revisions) as the Ford Cougar from 1983 to 1985.

As Ford transitioned its car platforms to front-wheel drive, the Marquis was replaced by the Mercury Sable, with Mercury selling both lines for 1986.

=== Chassis specifications ===
The fourth-generation Marquis uses the rear-wheel drive Ford Fox platform. Initially developed for compact sedans, the architecture was expanded for a wide range of Ford and Lincoln-Mercury vehicles; as a multiple-wheelbase design, the Fox platform was introduced for the mid-size segment for 1980. A 105.6 inch wheelbase is shared with the Marquis, Ford LTD, and the Ford Granada/Mercury Cougar. The Fox architecture uses a unibody chassis, rather than a body-on-frame design used by full-size Ford and Lincoln-Mercury vehicles).

In line with other Fox-platform vehicles, the Marquis uses a front suspension of MacPherson struts with a four-link live rear axle (using coil springs). As with the previous generation, the Marquis used front disc brakes with rear drum brakes.

==== Powertrain ====
The fourth-generation Marquis was offered with four separate engines over its production. Sedans featured a 2.3 L inline-4 as standard equipment; a propane-fuel version of the engine was an option. Station wagons were marketed with six-cylinder engines; a 3.3 L inline-6 (dating back to the Falcon/Comet) was the standard engine for station wagons and optional on sedans. A 3.8 L V6 was optional on both body styles, replacing the inline-6 entirely for 1984. Sold only in Canada from 1984 to 1985, the Marquis LTS was powered by the 5.0 L HO V8 (shared with the Mustang).

A 4-speed manual was standard with the 2.3 L engine, and was deleted after 1983; subsequent production used the previously optional 3-speed C3 automatic. The 3.3 L six was paired solely with a 3-speed C5 automatic. The 3.8 L V6 used two different transmissions: the 4-speed AOD automatic was standard for 1983, becoming an option for 1984; the 3-speed C5 became standard for 1984 (replacing the AOD entirely for 1985). All examples with the 5.0 L V8 (the LTS) used the 4-speed AOD automatic.

Fourth-generation Mercury Marquis powertrain specifications
Engine name (Engine family)	Production	Configuration	Fuel system	Output		Transmission
Engine name (Engine family)	Production	Configuration	Fuel system	Horsepower	Torque	Transmission
Ford 2.3 L OHC (Pinto LL23)	1983–1986	2.3 L (140 cu in) SOHC I4	Carter 1-bbl carburetor	90 hp (67 kW) (1983) 88 hp (66 kW) (1984–1985)	122 lb⋅ft (165 N⋅m)	4-speed manual (1983) Ford 3-speed C3 automatic
Ford Mileage Maker Six (Falcon Six)	1983	3.3 L (200 cu in) OHV I6	Holley 1-bbl carburetor	92 hp (69 kW)	156 lb⋅ft (212 N⋅m)	Ford 3-speed C5 automatic
Ford 3.8 L V6 (Essex V6)	1983–1986	3.8 L (232 cu in) OHV V6	Ford 2-bbl carburetor Fuel injection (Throttle-body)	112 hp (84 kW) (2-bbl) 120 hp (89 kW) (TBI)	175 lb⋅ft (237 N⋅m) (2-bbl) 205 lb⋅ft (278 N⋅m) (TBI)	Ford 4-speed AOD automatic (1983–1984) Ford 3-speed C5 automatic (1984–1986)
Ford 5.0 L HO V8 (Windsor)	1984–1985	4.9 L (302 cu in) OHV V8	Fuel injection (Throttle-body)	165 hp (123 kW)	245 lb⋅ft (332 N⋅m)	Ford 4-speed AOD automatic

=== Body design ===
The fourth-generation Marquis was produced as a four-door sedan and as a five-door station wagon (the two-door was discontinued, with the Cougar becoming the sole Mercury mid-size coupe. Sharing its entire bodyshell with its Ford LTD, the Marquis was distinguished by its own grille, taillamps, and parking lamp lenses. For the 1985 model year, the Marquis underwent a minor exterior revision; along with revised taillamps, Mercury lettering in the grille was replaced with a centered crest emblem.

The interior of the Marquis and LTD was largely shared between the two model lines (with the exception of the interior door panels). To save development costs, the Marquis retained the dashboard design of the Cougar XR-7 coupe (mixing wood and silver trim), adopting its electronic instrument panel option. Adopted from the full-size Marquis and the Cougar XR-7, the Marquis continued the use of an electronic trip computer.

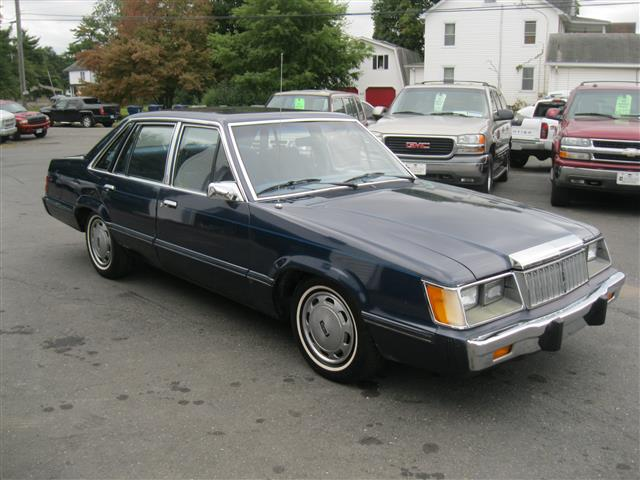
1985 Marquis Brougham

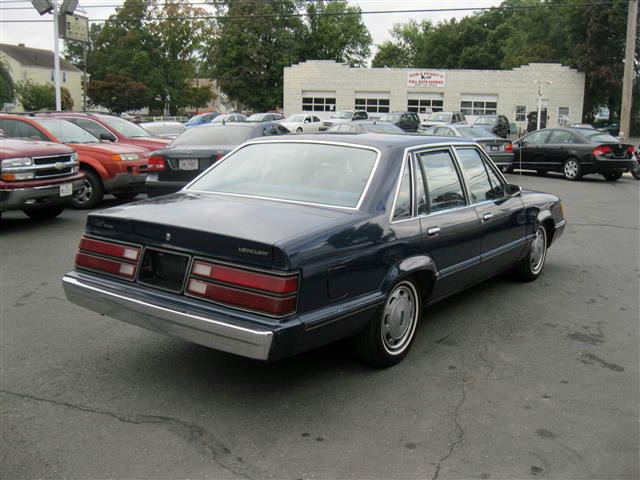
1985 Marquis Brougham, rear view

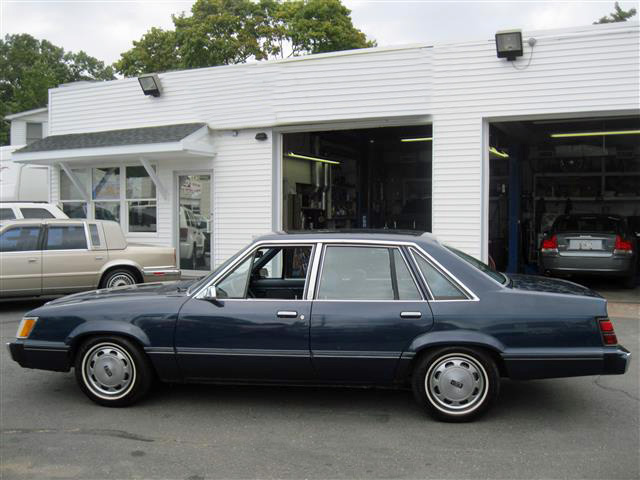
1985 Marquis Brougham, side profile

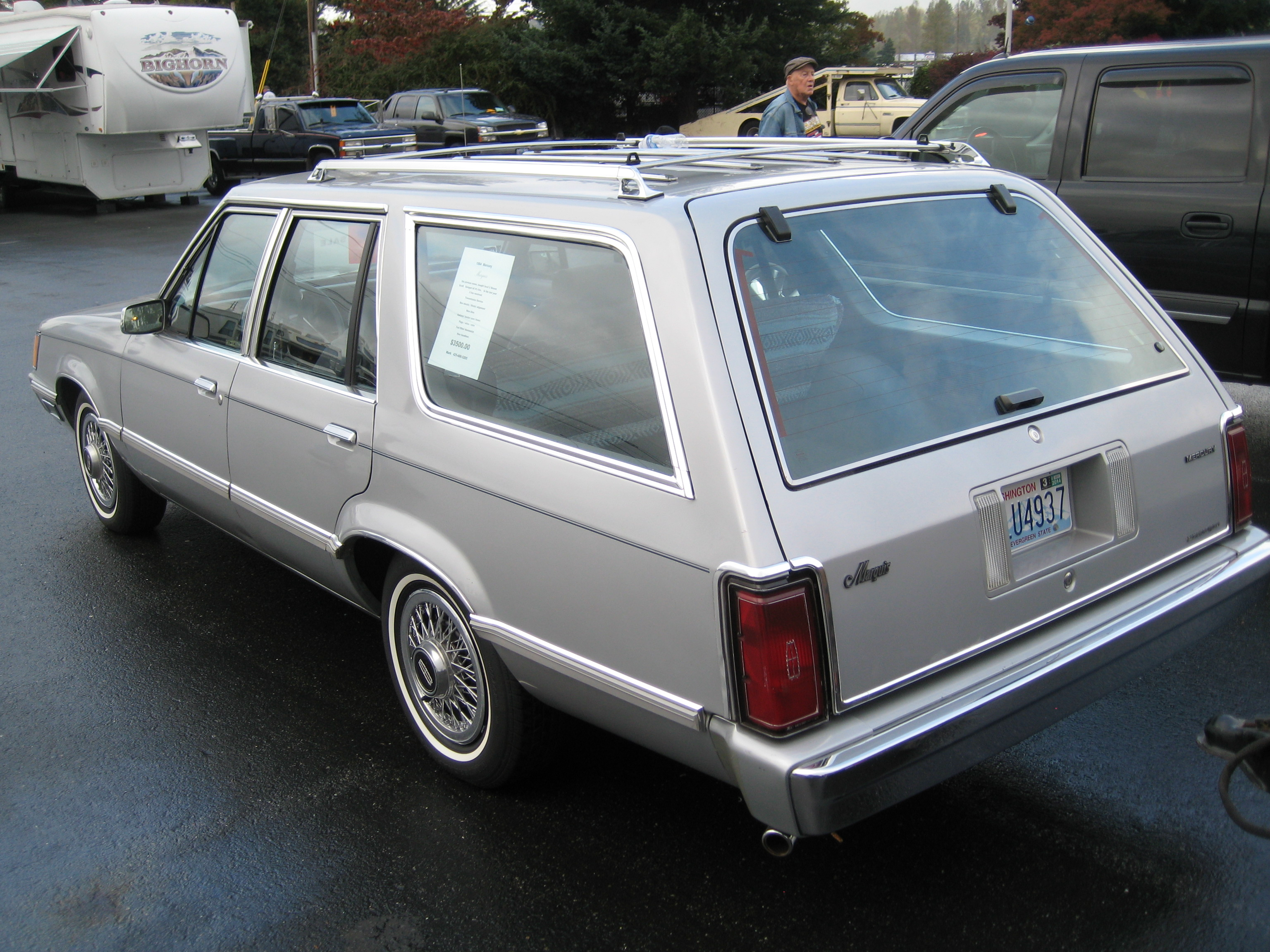
1984 Marquis station wagon, rear view

=== Trim ===
The fourth-generation Marquis sedan was produced in two trim levels: the base Marquis and the Marquis Brougham. The station wagon was not available under the Brougham trim level; a woodgrain exterior trim option was offered (dropping the Villager trim name).

=== Marquis LTS ===
During the 1985 model year, the Marquis LTS was introduced. Sold only in Canada, the LTS was a counterpart of the Ford LTD LX. Powered by a 165 hp 5.0-liter V8 from the Mustang, the LTS and LX adopted suspension and brake components from the police-package version of the LTD. After the 1985 model year, the trim was discontinued; only 134 were produced (making it one of the rarest vehicles ever sold by Mercury).

=== Production figures ===
Mercury Marquis Production Figures
	Sedan	Wagon	Yearly Total
1983	50,169	17,189	67,358
1984	91,808	16,004	107,812
1985	91,465	12,733	104,198
1986	24,121	4,461	28,582
Total	257,563	50,387	307,950

== Discontinuation ==
For the 1986 model year, Mercury introduced the front-wheel drive Mercury Sable, replacing the Marquis as its mid-size model line; both models were sold concurrently through the 1986 model year. The final example was produced by Atlanta Assembly on December 13, 1985 and by Chicago Assembly on January 3, 1986. Originally introduced as the third-generation Marquis in 1979, the design of the Grand Marquis was produced nearly unchanged through the 1991 model year. After an extensive redesign (though retaining the Panther chassis) for 1992, the Grand Marquis remained in production for 19 model years, becoming the final vehicle produced for the brand in January 2011.
