= Hazelwood, Missouri =

City in St. Louis County, Missouri, United States

- City
- City of Hazelwood
- Flag

- Location of Hazelwood, Missouri
- Coordinates: 38°46′46″N 90°21′23″W
- Country: United States
- State: Missouri
- County: St. Louis
- Incorporated: 1949

Government
  - Mayor: Matthew G. Robinson
  - City Council: William Hoops (Ward 1); Charles McGhee (Ward 2); Lesli Henderson (Ward 3); Kevin Foley (Ward 4); Lisa Matlock (Ward 5); Lisa Simpson (Ward 6); Robert Smith (Ward 7); Jen Hatton (Ward 8)
  - Interim City Manager: Chief James Hudanick

Area
  - Total: 16.76 sq mi (43.42 km^{2})
  - Land: 16.04 sq mi (41.54 km^{2})
  - Water: 0.73 sq mi (1.88 km^{2})
- Elevation: 469 ft (143 m)

Population (2020)
  - Total: 25,458
  - Density: 1,587.3/sq mi (612.87/km^{2})
- Time zone: UTC−6 (Central (CST))
  - Summer (DST): UTC−5 (CDT)
- ZIP code: 63042
- Area code: 314
- FIPS code: 29-31276
- GNIS feature ID: 2394341
- Website: www.hazelwoodmo.org

Hazelwood is a city in St. Louis County, Missouri, United States, within greater St. Louis. It is a second-ring northern suburb of St. Louis. Based on the 2020 United States census, the city had a total population of 25,485. It is located north of St. Louis-Lambert International Airport and is situated on Interstates 270 and 170, as well as the much-traveled Lindbergh Boulevard and Highway 370.

== Geography ==
According to the United States Census Bureau, the city has a total area of 16.76 square miles (43.41 km^{2}), of which 0.74 sq mi (1.92 km^{2}) is covered by water.

Cowmire Creek runs through Hazelwood and flows into the Missouri River here.

== Demographics ==
=== Racial and ethnic composition ===
Hazelwood city, Missouri – Racial and ethnic composition Note: the US Census treats Hispanic/Latino as an ethnic category. This table excludes Latinos from the racial categories and assigns them to a separate category. Hispanics/Latinos may be of any race.
Race / Ethnicity (NH = Non-Hispanic)	Pop 2000	Pop 2010	Pop 2020	% 2000	% 2010	% 2020
White alone (NH)	20,778	16,090	11,314	79.29%	62.60%	44.44%
Black or African American alone (NH)	4,188	7,812	11,103	15.98%	30.39%	43.61%
Native American or Alaska Native alone (NH)	47	57	52	0.18%	0.22%	0.20%
Asian alone (NH)	311	353	388	1.19%	1.37%	1.52%
Native Hawaiian or Pacific Islander alone (NH)	15	10	10	0.06%	0.04%	0.04%
Other race alone (NH)	20	49	210	0.08%	0.19%	0.82%
Mixed race or Multiracial (NH)	428	556	1,321	1.63%	2.16%	5.19%
Hispanic or Latino (any race)	419	776	1,060	1.60%	3.02%	4.16%
Total	26,206	25,703	25,458	100.00%	100.00%	100.00%

Historical population
Census	Pop.	Note	%±
1950	336		—
1960	6,045		1,699.1%
1970	14,082		133.0%
1980	12,935		−8.1%
1990	15,324		18.5%
2000	26,206		71.0%
2010	25,703		−1.9%
2020	25,458		−1.0%
U.S. Decennial Census 2020

=== 2020 census ===
As of the 2020 census, Hazelwood had a population of 25,458 and 10,927 households, of which 6,323 were families. The population density was 1,587.2 per square mile (612.9/km^{2}).

The median age was 37.6 years. 22.6% of residents were under the age of 18 and 15.1% of residents were 65 years of age or older. For every 100 females there were 88.4 males, and for every 100 females age 18 and over there were 83.9 males age 18 and over.

98.1% of residents lived in urban areas, while 1.9% lived in rural areas.

Of the 10,927 households, 28.6% had children under the age of 18 living in them. Of all households, 33.8% were married-couple households, 21.1% were households with a male householder and no spouse or partner present, and 38.3% were households with a female householder and no spouse or partner present. About 34.4% of all households were made up of individuals and 11.9% had someone living alone who was 65 years of age or older. The average household size was 2.2 and the average family size was 3.0.

There were 11,832 housing units, of which 7.6% were vacant. The homeowner vacancy rate was 1.3% and the rental vacancy rate was 9.7%.

Racial composition as of the 2020 census
Race	Number	Percent
White	11,514	45.2%
Black or African American	11,143	43.8%
American Indian and Alaska Native	81	0.3%
Asian	390	1.5%
Native Hawaiian and Other Pacific Islander	10	0.0%
Some other race	674	2.6%
Two or more races	1,646	6.5%
Hispanic or Latino (of any race)	1,060	4.2%

=== 2016–2020 American Community Survey ===
The 2016–2020 5-year American Community Survey estimated that the median household income was $52,201 (with a margin of error of +/- $3,891) and the median family income was $65,118 (+/- $8,948). Males had a median income of $37,114 (+/- $6,098) versus $30,789 (+/- $1,724) for females. The median income for those above 16 years old was $31,951 (+/- $1,695). Approximately, 9.6% of families and 11.2% of the population were below the poverty line, including 19.6% of those under 18 and 4.6% of those 65 or over.

=== 2010 census ===
As of the 2010 census 25,703 people, 10,933 households, and 6,608 families were living in the city. The population density was 1,604.4 inhabitants per square mile (619.5/km^{2}). The 11,730 housing units had an average density of 732.2 per square mile (282.7/km^{2}). The racial makeup of the city was 64.1% White, 30.5% African American, 0.3% Native American, 1.4% Asian, 1.2% from other races, and 2.5% from two or more races. Hispanics or Latino of any race were 3.0% of the population.

Of the 10,933 households, 31.2% had children under 18 living with them, 38.3% were married couples living together, 17.3% had a female householder with no husband present, 4.8% had a male householder with no wife present, and 39.6% were not families. About 33.7% of all households were made up of individuals, and 10.4% had someone living alone who was 65 or older. The average household size was 2.34 and the average family size was 3.01.

The median age in the city was 36.8 years. The city's age distribution was 23.2% under 18, 9.9% from 18 to 24, 27.0% from 25 to 44, 27.2% from 45 to 64, and 12.4% were 65 or older. The gender makeup of the city was 47.0% male and 53.0% female.

The median household income was $47,838, and the median family income was $57,293. Males had a median income of $42,399 compared with $35,800 for females. The per capita income for the city was $24,651. About 8.3% of families and 9.3% of the population were below the poverty line, including 15.2% of those under 18 and 4.9% of those 65 or over.

=== 2000 census ===
As of the 2000 census, 26,206 people, 10,954 households, and 6,714 families were living in the city. The population density was 1,649.9 inhabitants per square mile (637.0/km^{2}). The 11,433 housing units had an average density of 719.8 per square mile (277.9/km^{2}). The racial makeup of the city was 80.24% White, 16.04% African American, 1.19% Asian, 0.18% Native American, 0.58% from other races, and 1.76% from two or more races. Hispanics or Latinos of any race were 1.60% of the population.

Of the 10,954 households, 29.6% had children under 18 living with them, 44.4% were married couples living together, 12.7% had a female householder with no husband present, and 38.7% were not families. About 32.1% of all households were made up of individuals, and 9.7% had someone living alone who was 65 older. The average household size was 2.38 and the average family size was 3.05.

In the city, the age distribution was 24.6% under 18, 9.7% from 18 to 24, 31.7% from 25 to 44, 22.4% from 45 to 64, and 11.6% who were 65 or older. The median age was 36 years. For every 100 females, there were 92.3 males. For every 100 women 18 and over, there were 89.0 men.

The median income for a household in the city was $45,110, and for a family was $52,656. Males had a median income of $40,031 versus $27,871 for females. The per capita income for the city was $22,311. About 4.3% of families and 6.3% of the population were below the poverty line, including 8.1% of those under age 18 and 7.2% of those age 65 or over.

== Climate ==
Climate data for Hazelwood, Missouri
Month	Jan	Feb	Mar	Apr	May	Jun	Jul	Aug	Sep	Oct	Nov	Dec	Year
Mean daily maximum °F (°C)	38 (3)	43 (6)	55 (13)	67 (19)	76 (24)	85 (29)	89 (32)	87 (31)	80 (27)	69 (21)	55 (13)	42 (6)	66 (19)
Mean daily minimum °F (°C)	21 (−6)	25 (−4)	36 (2)	46 (8)	56 (13)	66 (19)	70 (21)	68 (20)	61 (16)	48 (9)	38 (3)	26 (−3)	47 (8)
Average precipitation inches (mm)	1.8 (46)	2.1 (53)	3.6 (91)	3.5 (89)	4.0 (100)	3.7 (94)	3.9 (99)	2.9 (74)	3.1 (79)	2.7 (69)	3.3 (84)	3.0 (76)	37.5 (950)
Average snowfall inches (cm)	6.5 (17)	5.3 (13)	3.7 (9.4)	.6 (1.5)	0 (0)	0 (0)	0 (0)	0 (0)	0 (0)	0 (0)	1.5 (3.8)	4.6 (12)	22.2 (56)
Average relative humidity (%)	81	80	79	77	81	82	83	86	86	82	81	82	82
Source: Weatherbase

== Education ==
The majority of Hazelwood is covered by the Hazelwood School District. The district has one high school in the Hazelwood city limits, Hazelwood West. The district also has Hazelwood West Middle School and several elementary schools (Armstrong, McNair, Russell, and Garrett), in the city limits. There is also one preschool, the Early Childhood Education (ECE) Center West, operated by the district, in the city limits.

Part of Hazelwood is in the Ferguson-Florissant School District. That district's headquarters are in the Hazelwood city limits. Also, several private schools are in Hazelwood: Alphabet Soup Academy, Asa Christian Academy, Blossom Wood Day School, and Oak Bridge. Gateway Legacy Christian Academy, an international boarding school with students from over 30 countries, is presently located at the historic former St. Stanislaus Seminary.

=== Public libraries ===
St. Louis County Library operates the Prairie Commons Branch in Hazelwood.

== Economy ==
Due to its location along Interstate 270 between Interstate 170 and Missouri 370, as well as adjacency to St. Louis-Lambert International Airport, Hazelwood is a major regional hub for manufacturing, distribution, and office facilities. The city is home to a substantial workforce, with 17,063 jobs as of 2015, according to the U.S. Census Bureau.

The city was home to a Ford plant from 1948 to 2006 and employed 1,400 at the time of closure. The site of the former plant is in the process of being redeveloped into Aviator Business Park. On the opposite side of Lindbergh Blvd., after the completion of one building in 2007, the Great Recession and ownership troubles stalled the now-named Hazelwood Logistics Center until the land was sold in 2015. The new owners finishing building out the park with a total of 1.8 million square feet of industrial space completed and leased between 2015 and mid-2018. The industrial park is expected to generate 1,800 jobs. TradePort is a 325-acre industrial park under construction north of the St. Louis Outlet Mall (formerly St. Louis Mills) that upon completion in the mid-2020s will feature up to 4 million square feet of new industrial development.

Hazelwood is home to the headquarters of Mallinckrodt Pharmaceuticals and several facilities for Boeing.

== Notable person ==
- T. R. Carr: Mayor of Hazelwood, Missouri, from April 2000 until April 2009.

== See also ==
- List of cities in Missouri
