= T.R. Carr =

Mayor of Hazelwood, Missouri

Mayor of Hazelwood, Missouri
- In office April 2000 – April 2009
- Governor: Matt Blunt

Personal details
- Party: Independent

T.R. Carr, Jr. is an American politician who served as the mayor of Hazelwood, Missouri from 2000 to 2009. He is professor of Public Administration at Southern Illinois University Edwardsville and senior research fellow at the Institute for Urban Research at SIUE. He has served as department chair of Public Administration and Policy Analysis and as director of the Master of Public Administration Program at SIUE. Carr represents SIUE on the State University Retirement System Member Advisory Board.

Carr now lives in Michigan, where he ran unsuccessfully for the Farmington Hills city council in 2019, and for the Farmington Public Schools board of education in 2022 and 2024.

== Board positions ==
Carr has held positions on these commissions and organizational boards of directors:

- St. Louis County Municipal League (2001–2008, president 2007–2008)
- North County, Incorporated
- St. Louis County Boundary Commission
- Northwest Chamber of Commerce
- Community Advisory Board, SSM Health (president 2000–2009)
- St. Louis County Fire Standards Commission (2005–2009)
- Ferguson Commission, a group assembled by Missouri Gov. Jay Nixon to address challenges leading to the Ferguson unrest (2014–2015)
- Missouri Municipal League (2004–2009, chaired Standing Committee on Policy and Resolutions)
- East-West Gateway Council of Governments (2007–2009)
- St. Louis-Samara Sister Cities Committee (treasurer)
