= Cowmire Creek =

Stream in Missouri, U.S.

Coordinates: 38.8197724°N 90.3870601°W

Cowmire Creek (sometimes spelled Cow Mire Creek) is a stream in St. Louis County in the U.S. state of Missouri. It is a tributary of the Missouri River.

Cowmire Creek was so named on account of its often miry condition.

== See also ==
- List of rivers of Missouri
