= Ford Thunderbird (eighth generation) =

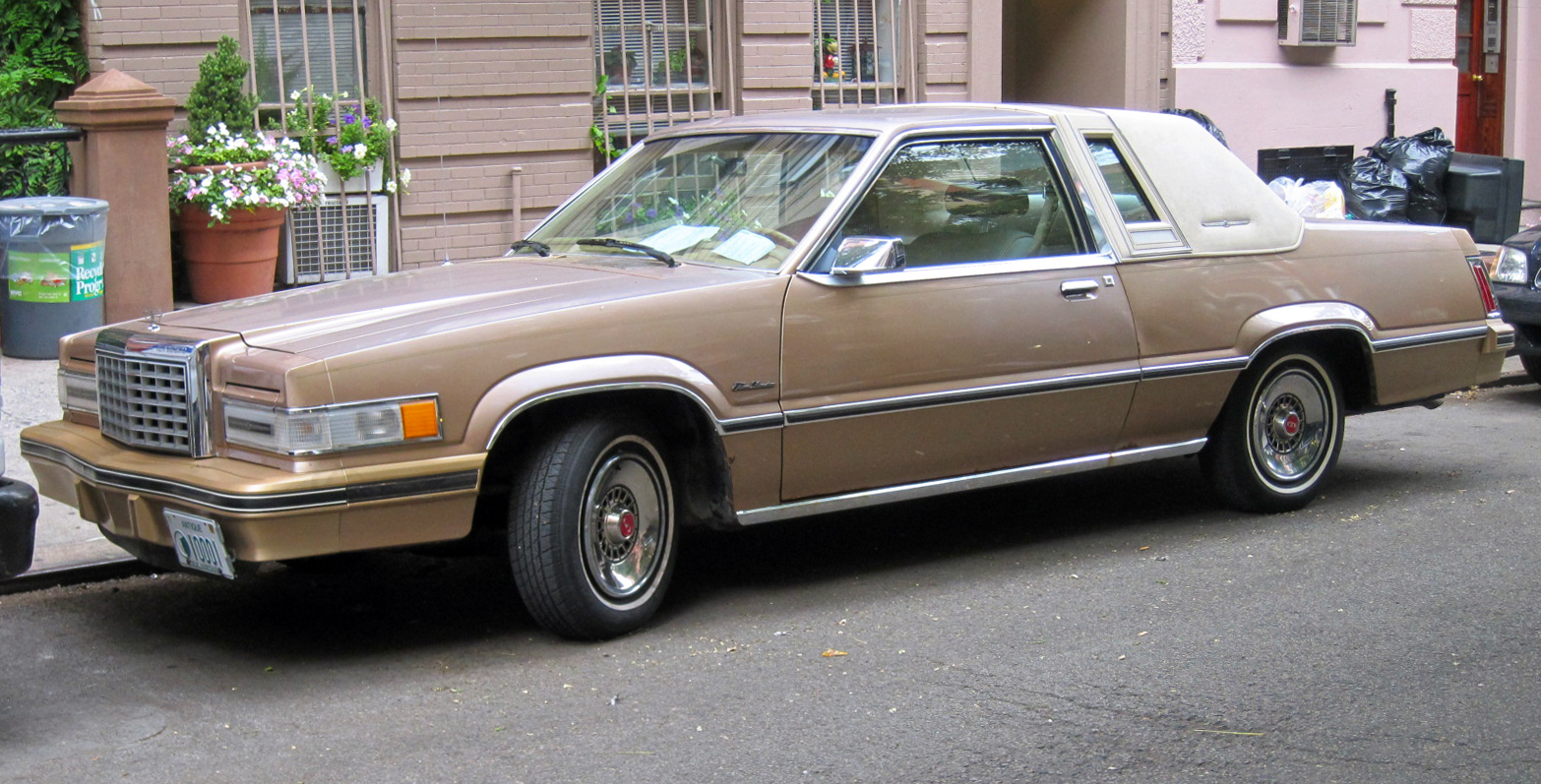
- 1982 Ford Thunderbird Town Landau

Overview
- Manufacturer: Ford Motor Company
- Production: 1979–1982
- Model years: 1980–1982
- Assembly: United States: Chicago, Illinois (Chicago Assembly); Hapeville, Georgia (Atlanta Assembly); Lorain, Ohio (Lorain Assembly)

Body and chassis
- Class: Personal luxury car
- Body style: 2-door coupe
- Layout: Front-engine, rear-wheel-drive
- Platform: Ford Fox
- Related: Mercury Cougar XR7; Continental Mark VII; Lincoln Continental

Powertrain
- Engine: 200 cu in (3.3 L) Thriftpower Six I6; 232 cu in (3.8 L) Essex V6; 255 cu in (4.2 L) Windsor V8; 302 cu in (4.9 L) Windsor V8
- Transmission: 4-speed Ford AOD overdrive automatic; 3-speed automatic

Dimensions
- Wheelbase: 108.4 in (2,750 mm)
- Length: 200.4 in (5,090 mm)
- Width: 74.1 in (1,880 mm)
- Height: 53.0 in (1,350 mm)
- Curb weight: 3,166–3,477 lb (1,436.1–1,577.1 kg)

Chronology
- Predecessor: Ford Thunderbird (seventh generation)
- Successor: Ford Thunderbird (ninth generation)

The eighth generation of the Ford Thunderbird is a personal luxury coupe that was manufactured and marketed by Ford from the 1980 to 1982 model years. Introduced to commemorate the 25th year of the Thunderbird, the eighth generation was substantially downsized, transitioning further into the mid-size segment. For a second generation, the Thunderbird remained the Ford counterpart of the Mercury Cougar XR7; while the Cougar again served as a complete line of mid-sized cars in various body styles starting with 1981 models, the Thunderbird was offered solely as a two-door personal luxury coupe.

While better-handling and more fuel-efficient than its Torino-based predecessor, the eighth-generation Thunderbird was poorly received by critics and buyers, leading to a collapse in sales (combined 1980–1982 production outsold 1979 production by only 4,000 cars). In response, the 1983 ninth-generation Thunderbird received an extensive redesign of the exterior (though sharing nearly identical chassis underpinnings), as Ford sought to remarket the model line.

The eighth-generation Thunderbird was assembled by Ford at Atlanta Assembly, Lorain Assembly, and Chicago Assembly; the former two facilities are now closed.

== Model background ==
During the late 1970s, fuel economy became a leading objective of the redesigns of American-brand automobiles; as part of the introduction of CAFE, manufacturers that sold cars in the United States were required to average 20.0 MPG for their passenger cars by the 1980 model year. In response, Ford repackaged the Thunderbird for the 1977 model year. Previously a Ford version of the Continental Mark IV coupe, the 1977 Thunderbird adopted the Ford Torino intermediate-segment chassis. Replacing the relatively obscure Ford Elite, the Thunderbird remained in the personal luxury segment, becoming the Ford counterpart of the Mercury Cougar XR7.

Though reduced in size, the downsized Thunderbird saw increased competition, marketed against the Chrysler Cordoba, Dodge Charger, Dodge Magnum and the quartet of GM A-body coupes (Buick Regal, Chevrolet Monte Carlo, Oldsmobile Cutlass Supreme, and Pontiac Grand Prix). In only three years in the marketplace, the model line proved successful, selling over 955,000 examples. However, by the 1979 model year, the Thunderbird had become obsolete in comparison to both its competitors and within the Ford model line. For 1978, General Motors downsized its mid-size A-body line (with exterior dimensions closely matching its "compact" lines); the redesign was well-received, with the Oldsmobile Cutlass becoming the best-selling car in the United States in 1978 and 1979. For 1979, the Ford LTD was downsized; though 8 inches shorter than the Thunderbird, the LTD offered larger interior dimensions.

For 1980, Ford moved the Thunderbird to an extended-wheelbase variant of the Ford Fox platform. Moving from the intermediate segment to the mid-size segment, the 1980 Thunderbird closely matched the 1978 GM A-body coupes in its exterior footprint.

== Design overview ==
In contrast to the previous generation (which served as a mid-cycle restyling and rebranding of the Ford Elite), the eighth-generation Thunderbird was the first version of the model line to integrate downsizing as part of its design process. The 1980 Thunderbird shed 17.3 inches in length, 4.4 inches in width, and 5.6 inches of wheelbase from its 1979 predecessor; (dependent on powertrain) the curb weight was reduced by up to 1,400 pounds.

Serving as one of the most extensively downsized model ranges of the American automobile industry, from 1976 to 1980, the Thunderbird shed over 25 inches of length, 12 inches of wheelbase, and nearly 1,900 pounds of curb weight. In comparison to the 1958–1960 generation, the 1980 Thunderbird is approximately five inches shorter in length and four inches shorter in wheelbase.

=== Chassis ===
The eighth-generation Ford Thunderbird is a long-wheelbase variant of the rear-wheel drive Ford Fox platform; stretched to 108.4 inches, it shares its chassis with the Mercury Cougar XR7 (1980–1982), the Lincoln Continental (1982–1987) and the Continental / Lincoln Mark VII (1984–1992). The adoption of the Fox architecture marked the return to unibody construction for the Thunderbird (not used since 1966).

Shared with the Fairmont and Mustang, the Thunderbird had MacPherson strut front suspension and a four-link live rear axle with coil springs on all four wheels; both front and rear axles were equipped with stabilizer bars. As an option, the Thunderbird was offered with heavy-duty "handling" suspension, a limited-slip rear-axle, and aluminum wheels equipped with Michelin TRX tires. For the first time, the Thunderbird was equipped with rack and pinion steering. As with the Fairmont/Granada, the Thunderbird was equipped with front disc brakes and rear drum brakes.

==== Powertrain ====
Sharing its powertrain with the Panther chassis, the standard engine for the eighth-generation Thunderbird was a 115 hp (86 kW) 4.2 L V8, with a 131 hp (98 kW) 5.0 L V8 offered as an option. Both engines were paired with the 4-speed AOD overdrive automatic transmission. For 1982, the 4.9 L engine was withdrawn, with the 4.2 L engine becoming the sole V8 offering.

Late in the 1980 model year, the Thunderbird was offered with a six-cylinder engine for the first time. Technically considered a delete option, Ford introduced an 88 hp (66 kW) 3.3 L inline-6 (shared with the Fairmont and Granada), paired with a 3-speed automatic; for 1982, the 3.3 L engine became standard. Slotted between the inline-6 and the 4.2 L V8, for 1982, Ford introduced a 3.8L V6, rated at 112 hp (84 kW). In various forms, the V6 powered the Thunderbird until its 1997 withdrawal.

=== Body ===
The eighth-generation Thunderbird was produced solely as a two-door coupe, branded as the Ford counterpart of the Mercury Cougar XR7. In contrast to the Thunderbird, non-XR7 Cougars served as the Mercury counterpart of the Ford Granada (replacing the Mercury Monarch). With the exception of the grilles, rear fascia, and hidden headlamps (the Cougar used four exposed headlamps), the Thunderbird is nearly identical to the Cougar XR7.

Hoping to repeat the success of the 1977–1979 generation, Ford designers adopted many design elements from the previous generation, including its hidden headlights, rectangular radiator grille, taillights (revised to wrap into the fenders) and opera windows. However, many design features did not transition well onto the far smaller bodyshell.

From 1980 to 1982, the exterior of the model line saw few fundamental exterior changes. Dependent on trim, several greenhouses were offered for the Thunderbird; a full or partial vinyl roof was fitted to all examples. For 1981, a simulated convertible top was introduced (on standard-trim Thunderbirds). The model line marked the debut of Ford's proprietary door-mounted keypad system, marketed as its Keyless Entry System, a 5-button door-mounted keypad allowing access to the vehicle (through the entry of a 5-digit code).

As a consequence of its downsizing, the seating capacity of the 1980 Thunderbird was reduced from six to four. Dependent on trim, several seating configurations were offered for the Thunderbird, with Recaro bucket seats offered as an option. One of the last cars to offer functional vent windows, the model line also offered power windows, locks, and driver seat. Alongside a standard analog instrument panel, an optional digital instrument cluster offered a speedometer and fuel gauge; in 1982, a trip computer was added to the latter system.

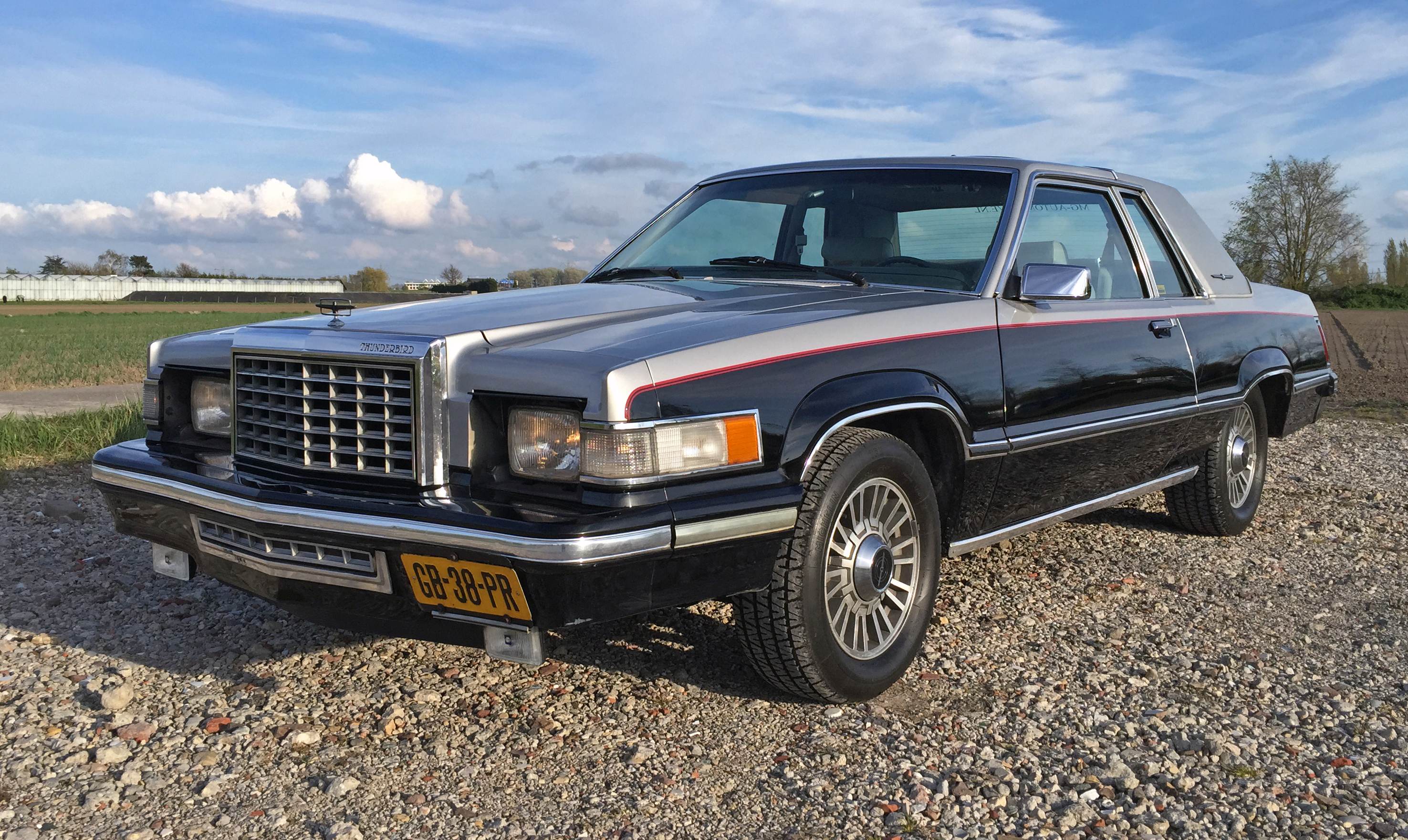
1980 Ford Thunderbird (base trim) with TRX wheels

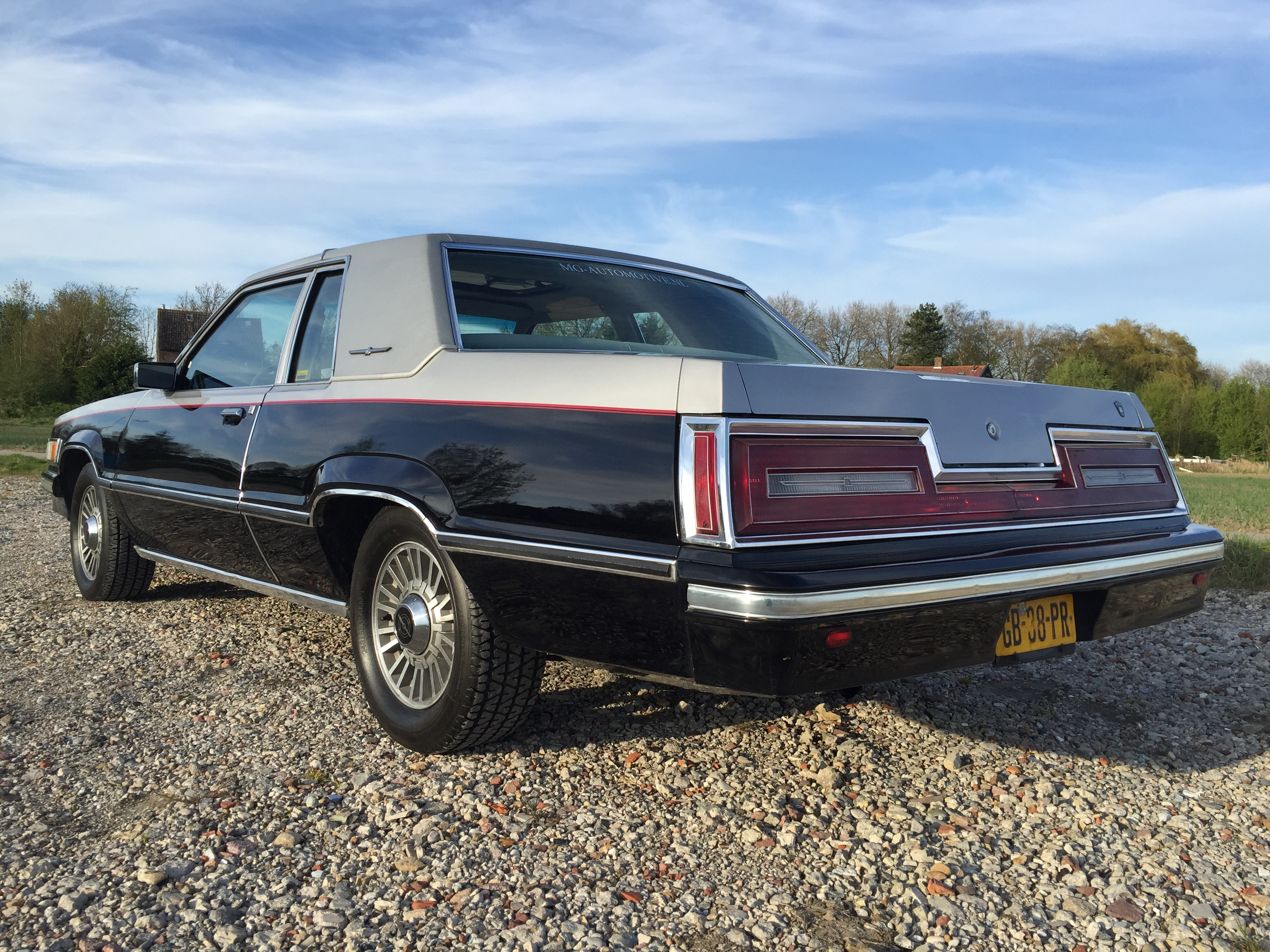
1980 Ford Thunderbird (base trim), rear

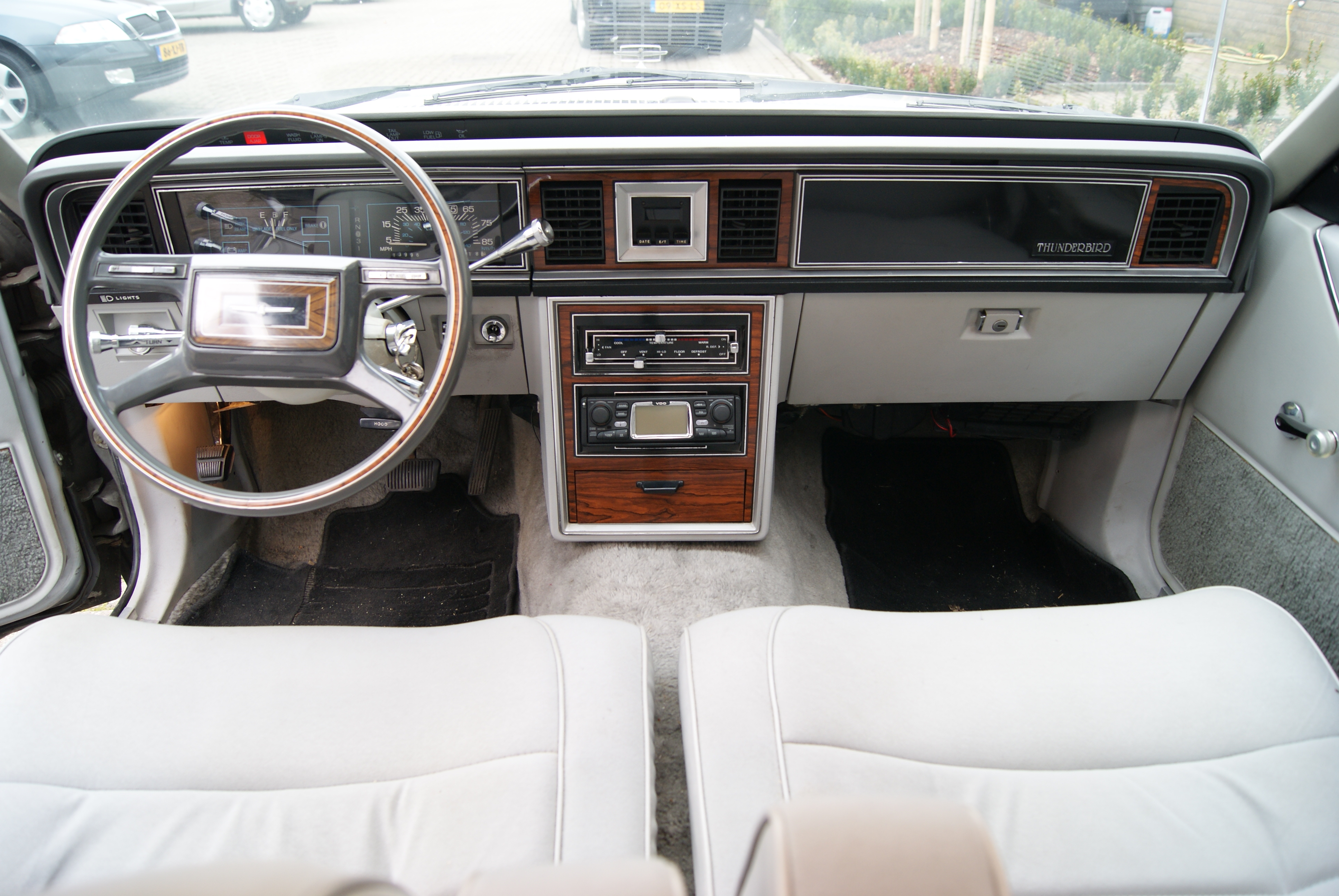
1980 Thunderbird interior (base trim)

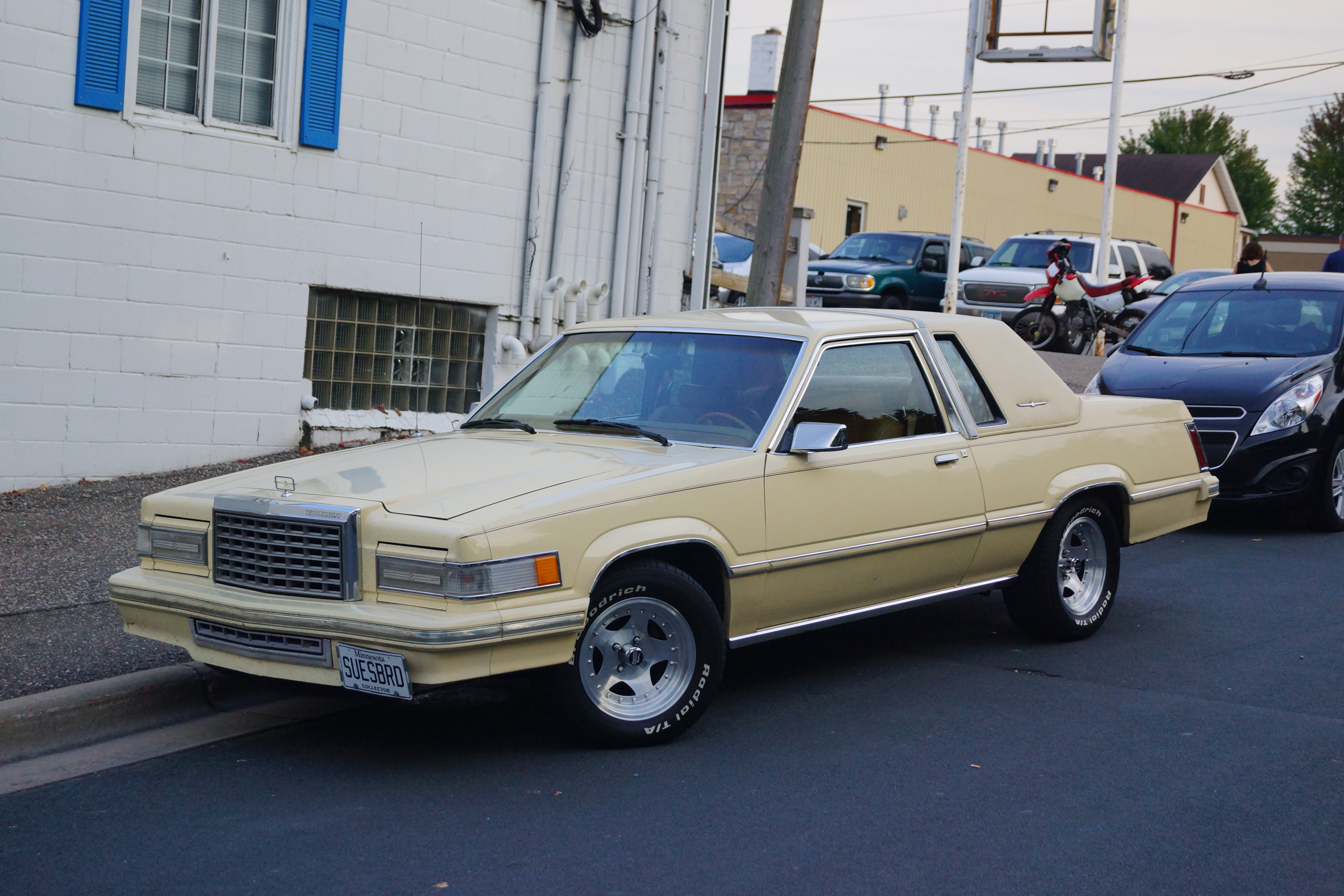
1980 Ford Thunderbird Town Landau (aftermarket wheels)

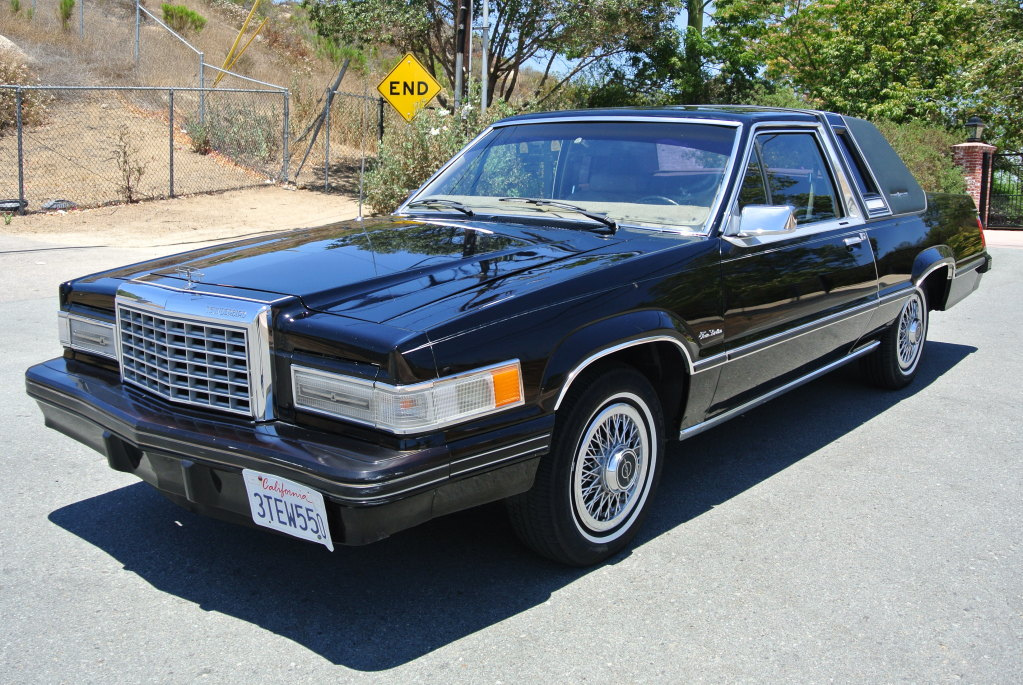
1982 Ford Thunderbird Town Landau

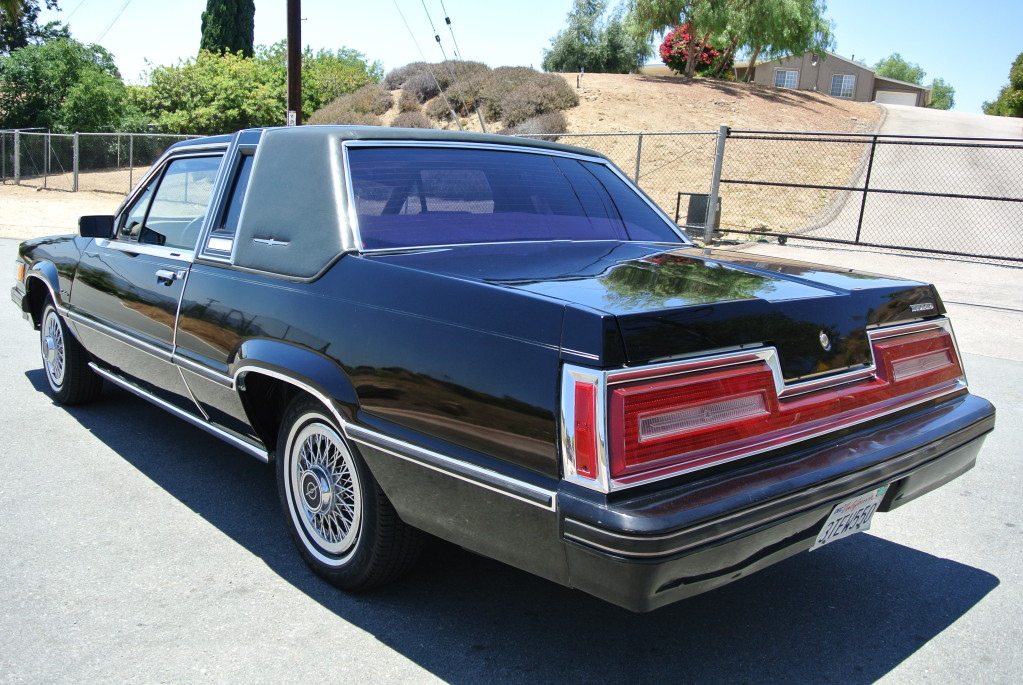
1982 Ford Thunderbird Town Landau, rear

=== Trim ===
Each year of its production, the eighth-generation was offered in three trim levels; the Thunderbird served as the base trim, slotted below the Town Landau and Heritage (1981–1982). For 1980, the commemorative Silver Anniversary Edition was the top-level trim, repackaged as the Heritage for 1981–1982.

Each trim level of the Thunderbird was distinguished by its own greenhouse. The standard Thunderbird was given the largest windows between the B-pillar; for 1981, a simulated convertible top became an option. For 1980, the Town Landau was styled with a recessed opera window, then sharing the greenhouse of the Heritage for 1981–1982. The Silver Anniversary Edition, Heritage, and 1981–1982 Town Landau have B-pillar opera windows in the style of the 1977–1979 Thunderbird (without the large rear quarter window).

==== Silver Anniversary Edition ====
To mark the 25th anniversary of the Thunderbird, Ford offered a commemorative "Silver Anniversary Edition" for the 1980 model year. Offered as a cosmetic option package as the top-level trim, the Silver Anniversary Edition consisted of an exclusive color scheme (Anniversary Glow Silver), with silver/gray velour (or leather). Offered only with the 4.9 L V8 and AOD transmission, the Silver Anniversary Edition included every feature offered on the Thunderbird, adding a "frenched" rear window, rosewood interior trim, commemorative badging, and an integrated garage door opener.

== Motorsport ==
For its 1981 season, two major changes were adapted by NASCAR for its Winston Cup racing series. Coinciding with downsizing of passenger automobiles, NASCAR reduced the wheelbase of Winston Cup cars from 115 to 110 inches. To ensure chassis consistency, NASCAR abandoned its previous practice of three-year model eligibility, requiring teams to adapt to current-production vehicles.

In response to the rule change, Ford debuted the eighth-generation Thunderbird (while also eligible, no drivers fielded a Mercury Cougar XR7). The Thunderbird finished the 1981 season with 7 wins (second only to the 22 wins of the Buick Regal). For 1982, the Thunderbird was less successful, winning only two races.

== Production totals ==
Year	Production
1980	156,803
1981	86,693
1982	45,142
Total	288,638
