= Ford Fox platform =

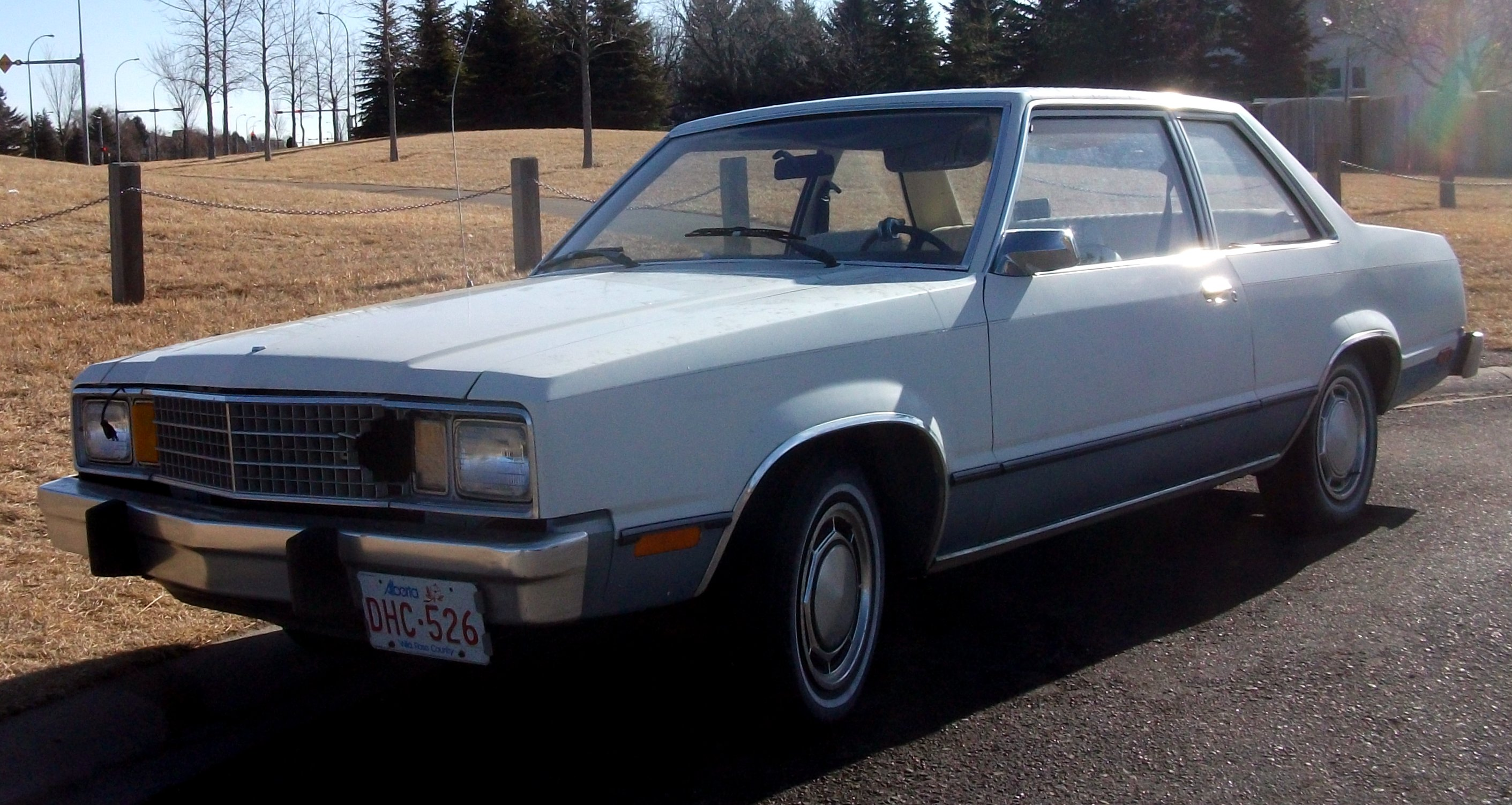
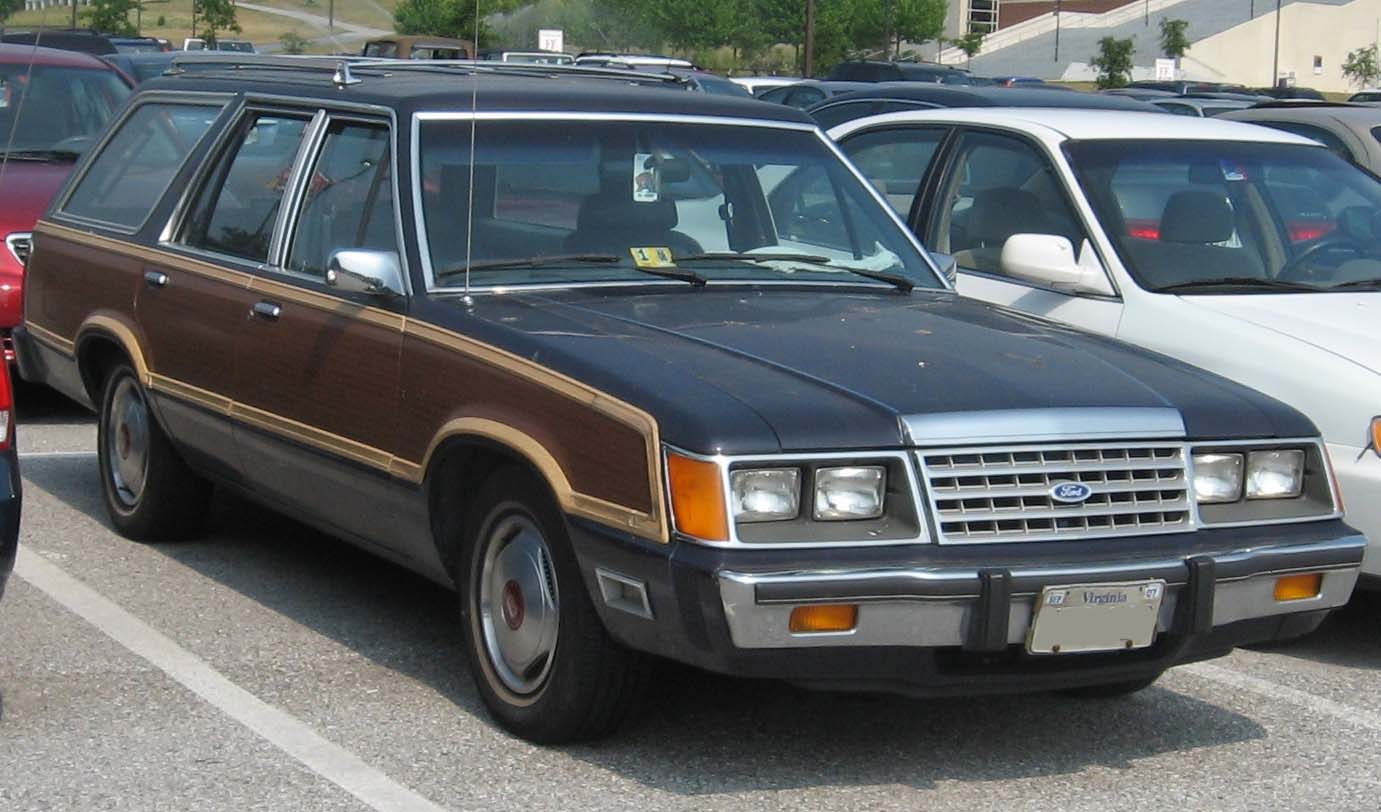
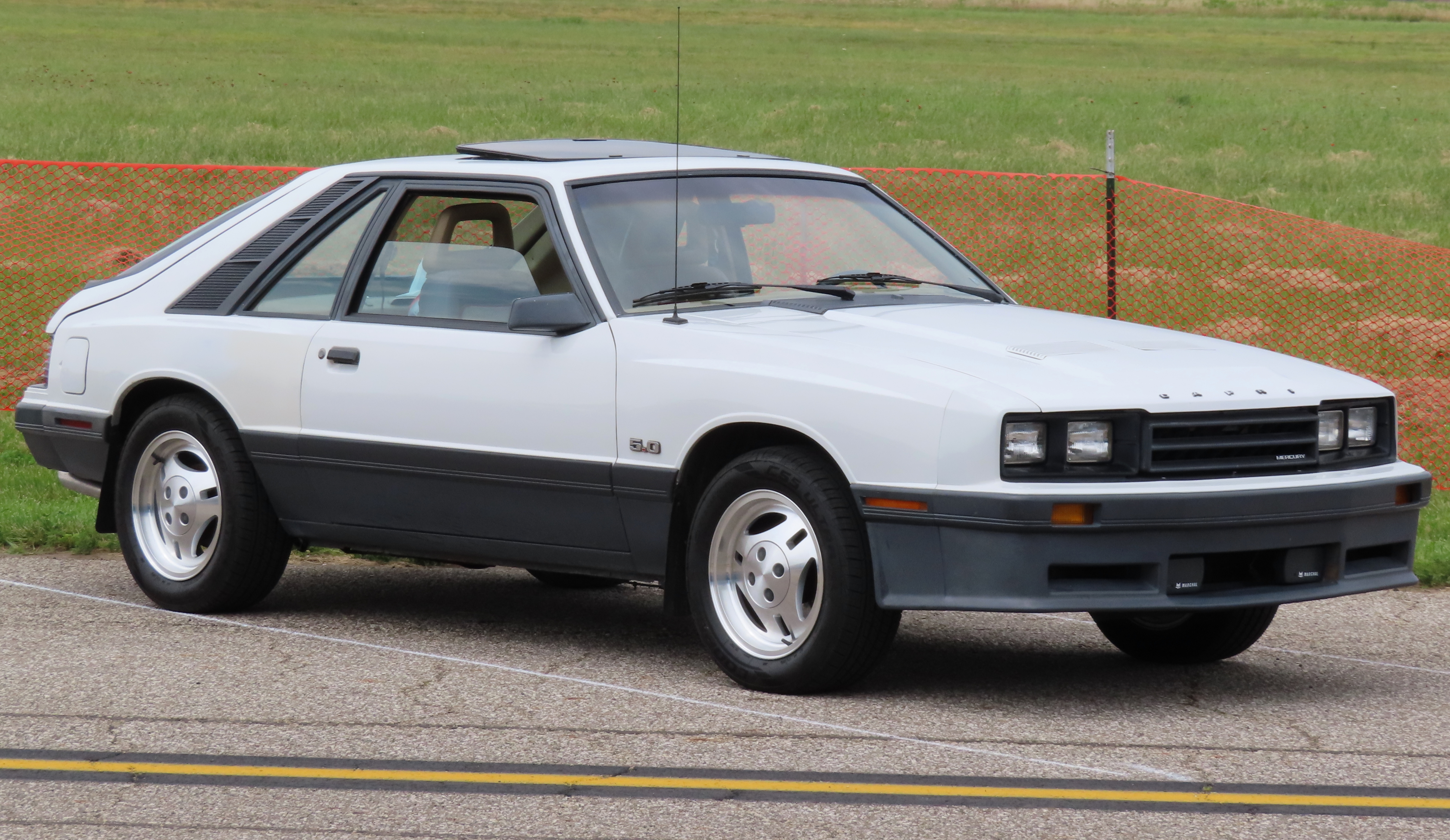
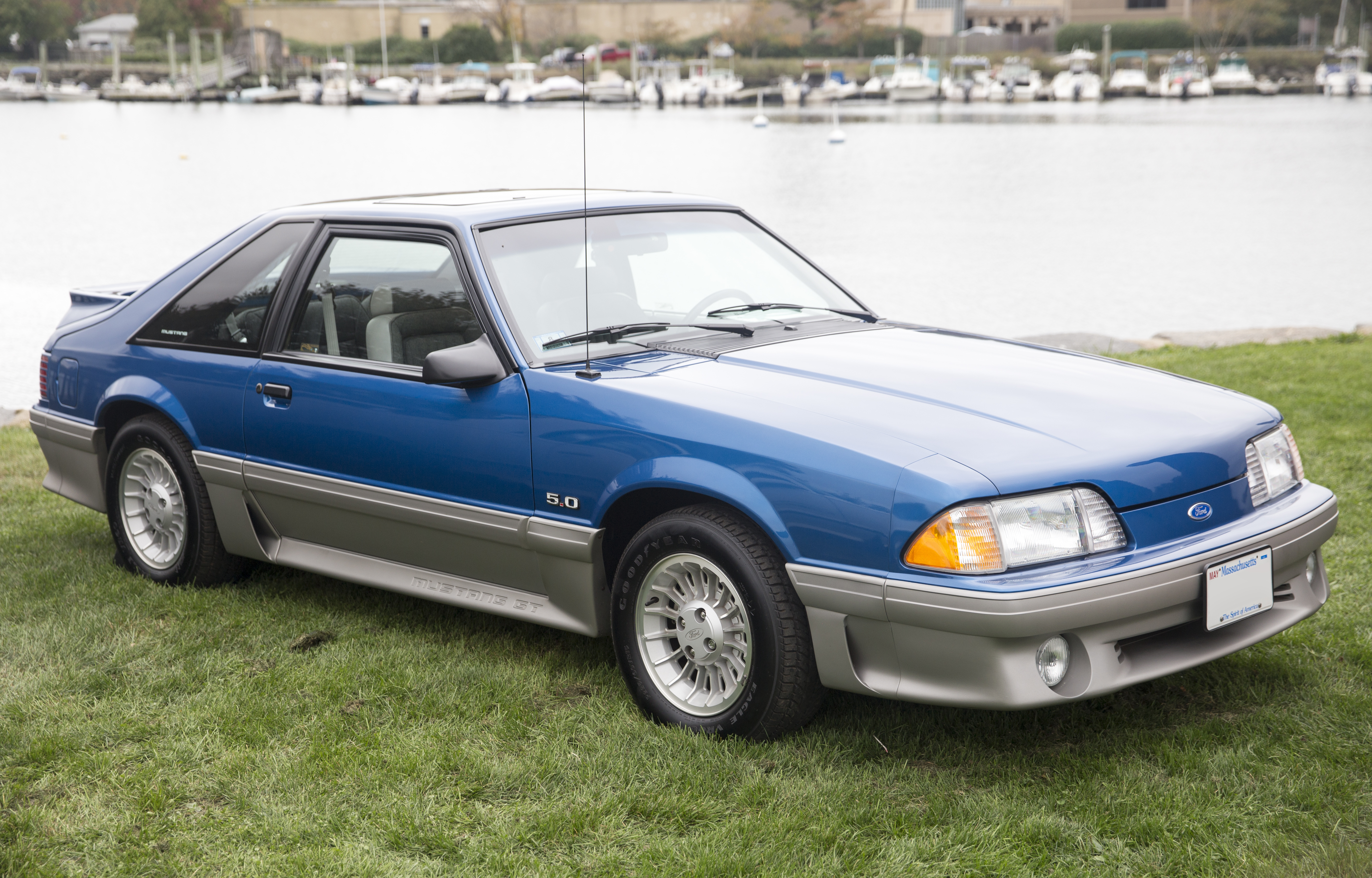
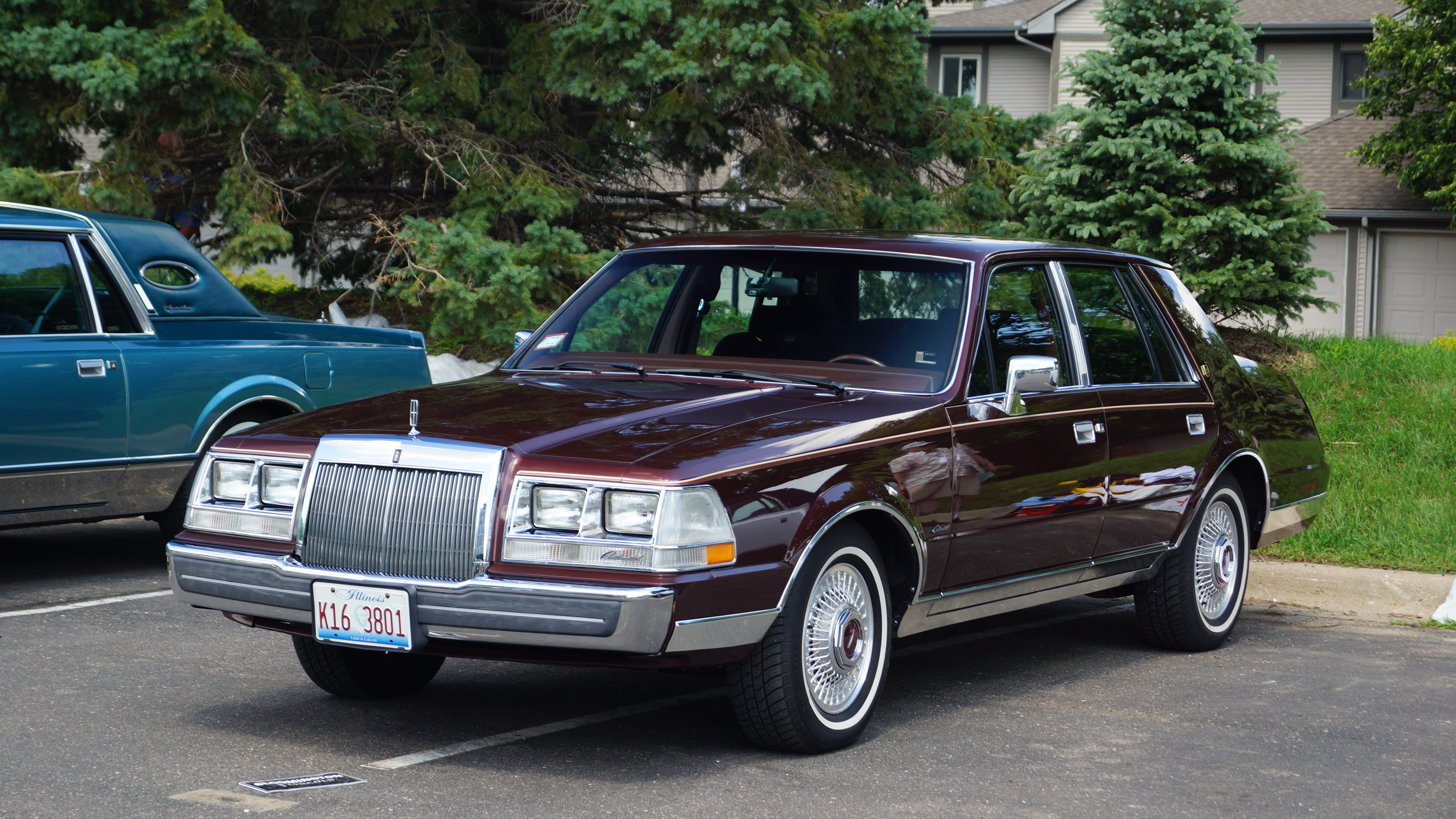
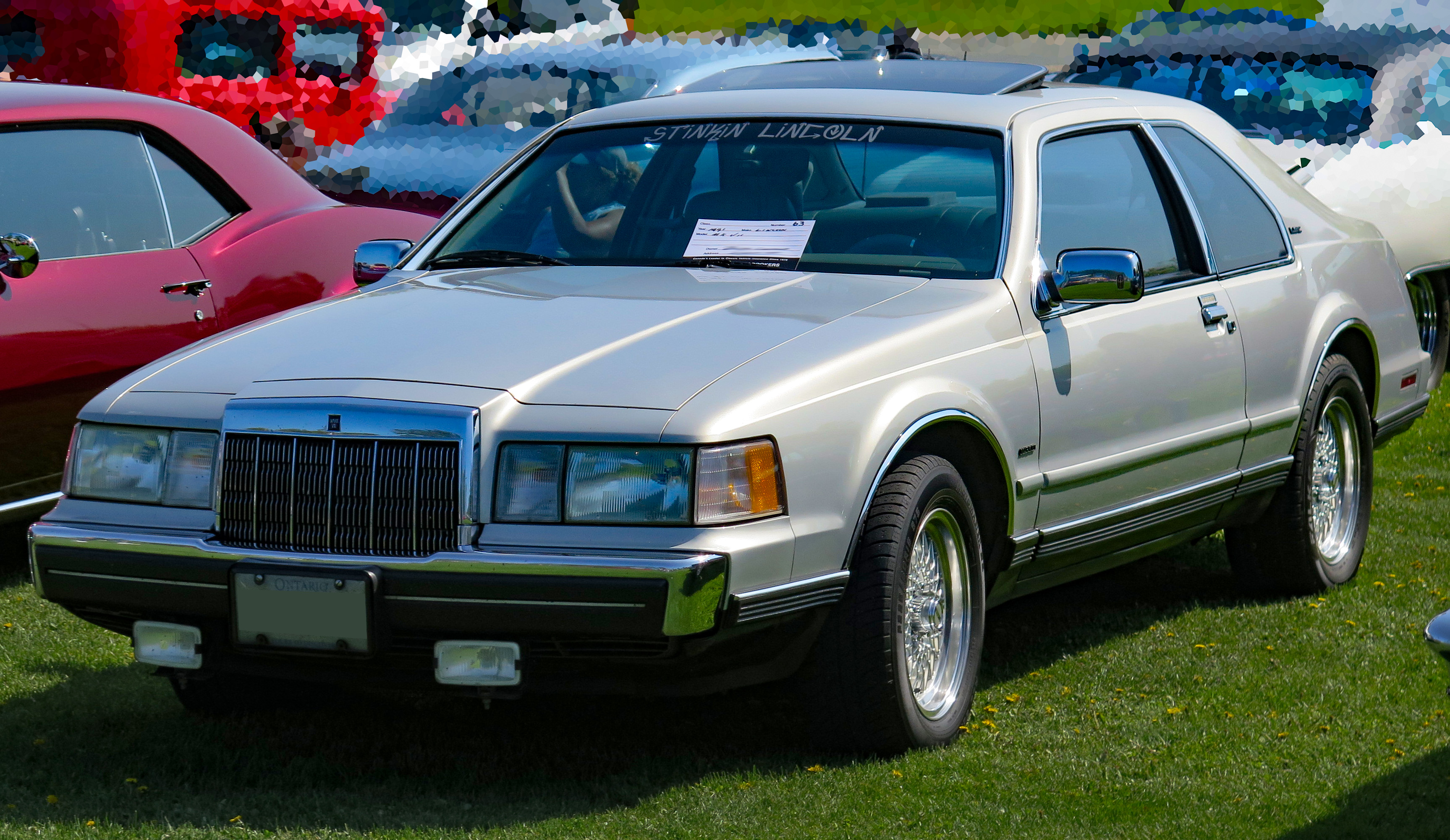
- Top row: 1979 Ford Fairmont, 1979 Mercury Zephyr Villager, 1986 Ford LTD Squire; Second row: 1988 Ford Thunderbird Turbo Coupe, 1985 Mercury Capri GS 5.0, 1990 Ford Mustang GT; Lower row: 1985 Lincoln Continental Designer Series, 1991 Lincoln Mark VII LSC

Overview
- Manufacturer: Ford Motor Company
- Production: 1978-1993

Body and chassis
- Class: Compact; Mid-size; Personal luxury car Pony car
- Layout: FR layout
- Body styles: 2-door convertible; 2-door coupe; 3-door hatchback; 2-door sedan; 4-door sedan; 5-door station wagon; 2-door coupe utility
- Vehicles: see below

Dimensions
- Wheelbase: 100.5–108.5 in (2,550–2,760 mm)

Chronology
- Predecessor: Ford Falcon platform (Ford Maverick/Ford Granada/Mercury Comet/Mercury Monarch); Ford Pinto platform (Ford Mustang II); Ford Torino platform (Ford LTD II/Ford Thunderbird/Mercury Cougar); Ford Panther platform (Lincoln Continental/Continental Mark VI)
- Successor: Ford SN-95 platform; Ford D2C platform; Ford MN12 platform; Ford DN5 platform; Ford CE14 platform

The Ford Fox platform is an automobile platform that was used by Ford Motor Company from the 1978 to 1993 model years. Originally introduced to underpin compact sedans, the rear-wheel drive Fox architecture was utilized across multiple design segments for Ford and Lincoln-Mercury vehicles. Produced across 26 model years, the Fox platform is the second-longest car architecture ever designed by Ford Motor Company (behind the 33 model years for the Panther platform).

Originally developed to replace the long-running Ford Falcon architecture, the Fox platform quickly took on a wider role within the company. Along with Ford shifting its Mustang and Capri model lines from subcompact chassis, the company downsized its intermediate-segment vehicles for 1980 (replacing the Ford Torino platform). Contrasting with the Mustang and the Fairmont, Ford brought several of its flagship vehicles onto the Fox chassis, including the Ford Thunderbird, Lincoln Continental, and the Lincoln Mark VII.

Designed to be relatively lightweight and simple, the Fox platform was a unibody chassis that utilized a wide variety of powertrains. Along with the sedans, coupes, and station wagons introduced by the inaugural Ford Fairmont and Mercury Zephyr, the chassis also underpinned hatchbacks and convertibles; it was also developed as a coupe utility pickup truck. Using four wheelbases, the Fox wheelbases supported compact pony cars and economy cars, mid-size family cars, and personal luxury coupes and luxury sedans.

As Ford transitioned its compact and mid-size vehicle lines to front-wheel drive, the usage of the Fox platform began to decline during the mid-1980s. In its original form, the architecture was produced through the 1993 model year, with a substantial redesign of the Ford Mustang extending its life into the 21st century; codenamed SN95, the fourth-generation Mustang ended production in 2004.

== Background and development ==
In the American automotive industry, 1973 marked a significant period of transition. In May, the EPA released the first comprehensive list of fuel economy data; in addition for providing information for consumers, the data was required to establish protocols for CAFE and gas-guzzler taxes. October 1973 marked the beginning of the first 1970s oil crisis, leading gas prices to increase to US$.55 (equivalent to $3.99 in 2025) per gallon.

Under chairman/CEO Henry Ford II and president Lee Iacocca, several changes were made at the executive level of Ford Motor Company. William O. Bourke, ex-chairman of Ford of Europe and one-time managing director of Ford of Australia, was made executive vice president of North American Operations; Robert Alexander, previously with Ford of Europe as vice president in charge of car development, was moved to same position in the United States. Hal Sperlich was Ford Vice President of Product Planning and Research.

A proponent of downsizing, Sperlich conceived of a "World Car" that could be sold in both Europe and North America as a solution to the needs of the various divisions. At the time, the Ford small-car product line included the subcompact Pinto and the Mustang II and the compact Maverick; while the Mustang II was several months from release, the Maverick was derived from the Falcon. Lincoln-Mercury sold no small cars of its own, importing the Capri from Ford of Europe. Ford of Europe sold the Escort as its smallest car; Ford UK sold the Cortina while Ford of Germany sold the Taunus

=== Fox platform development ===
In December 1973, Lee Iacocca formally approved development of the Fox platform. Sharing its name with the Audi Fox (although not named after it), Ford executives experienced with the automotive industry outside the United States sought to benchmark a new design from a popular European subcompact design.

Development started in early 1973 on both a short-wheelbase version to replace the Pinto/Cortina/Taunus lines and a long-wheelbase version that would become the Fairmont. Although the Fairmont would be the first Fox-based car to reach the market, development was guided by an anticipated sport coupe to be based on the new platform.

By 1974, the difficulties faced in meeting the conflicting regulatory requirements in different markets and differing production methods used by the various divisions had killed the world-car idea. While unable to replace the Cortina/Taunus, the Fox platform remained a multiple-wheelbase design, as the short-wheelbase version remained in development to replace the Mustang II. In 1975 North American Automobile Operations took over development of the Fox platform from Sperlich's Product Planning and Research group.

The first running Fox (Fairmont) prototype was a Cortina with a modified suspension, using MacPherson struts and torsion bars. The torsion bars would not appear in the final version.

== Chassis overview ==
The Fox platform, like most compact and mid-size cars of the late 1970s, was designed with a rear-wheel drive layout. In contrast to the full-size Fords and Mercurys of the time, the Fox platform used unibody construction.

The Fox platform used MacPherson strut front suspension, continuing the use of a live rear axle suspension configuration. Initially configured with rear drum brakes, four-wheel disc brakes were added to higher-performance vehicles, including the Continental Mark VII, Ford Mustang SVO, 1994–2004 Ford Mustang, and the Ford Thunderbird Turbo Coupe.

Due to the use of strut front suspension, the Fox platform was designed with a wider engine bay than its Falcon-chassis predecessor. As a result, the chassis was flexible in its use of longitudinal engines, accommodating a wide variety of powertrains, including four-cylinder (naturally-aspirated and turbocharged), inline-6, V6, and V8 engines, ranging from a 2.3 L inline-4 to a 5.0 L V8. To further improve the fuel economy of Lincoln Fox-platform vehicles in the 1980s, the platform was adapted for the use of BMW diesel inline-6 engines.

The Fox platform was produced in four separate wheelbases, 100.5 inches (for the Ford Mustang/Mercury Capri; lengthened to 101.3 for the SN95 redesign), 104.2 inches (1983–1988 Thunderbird/Cougar), 105.5 inches ("standard"; sedans/wagons), and 108.5 inches ("long"; 1980 Thunderbird/Cougar XR7/ Continental Mark VII/ Lincoln Mark VII/ Lincoln Continental).

== Design history ==
=== 1979-1981 model expansion ===
For 1979, Ford introduced the third-generation Mustang to replace the Pinto-derived Mustang II. Moving to the Fox platform, the Mustang grew slightly in size (closer to the 1964 original), joined by an all-new Mercury Capri (replaced by the unbranded captive-import Capri). Sharing no body panels with the Fairmont, Ford shortened the wheelbase of the Fox chassis by 5 inches for the Mustang.

For 1980, the Fox platform was expanded further, as it now supported newly downsized versions of the Ford Thunderbird and Mercury Cougar XR7, inherited from the discontinued Ford Torino chassis. The redesign debuted a longer-wheelbase variant of the chassis, intended for mid-size cars. In contrast to the well-received Mustang, the redesign of the Thunderbird and Cougar were poorly received, leading to a sales collapse of both models.

For 1981, the Fox platform replaced the Falcon chassis entirely, as it now supported the second-generation Granada and the Mercury Cougar sedan (which replaced the Monarch); the Lincoln Versailles was discontinued. Sharing the same wheelbase as the Fairmont/Zephyr, the Granada/Cougar featured formal styling elements from full-size Ford and Mercury sedans. In 1982, station wagons were moved from the Fairmont/Zephyr to the Granada/Cougar lines.

=== 1983 model year changes ===
During the early 1980s, the Fox platform played a central role involving changes to multiple Ford nameplates. The redesigns of the Ford Granada, Ford Thunderbird, and Mercury Cougar (XR7 and sedan) had each fared poorly in the marketplace, leading to a collapse in sales for each nameplate following the 1980 model year. In addition, fuel prices had begun to stabilize as the decade had progressed, shifting consumer demand back towards full-size cars; in response, Ford postponed its intended discontinuation of the full-size Panther-platform vehicles (originally slated for 1985-1986). To rectify the sales collapse and capitalize on the move back towards full-size lines, Ford commenced a multi-year shift of its best-selling vehicle nameplates in all three divisions.

For 1981, Lincoln saw the first changes (largely to eliminate a large degree of model overlap). The Lincoln Continental (its primary model line) was rechristened as the Lincoln Town Car, with the Continental becoming a mid-size sedan for 1982 (again competing against the Cadillac Seville). After the Mark VI lived out its model cycle, it was replaced by a far more contemporary Continental Mark VII for 1984; both the Mark VII and the Continental shared a wheelbase (but no body panels) with the 1980 Thunderbird.

For 1983, Ford and Mercury saw extensive changes to their product ranges. In moving their full-size lines upmarket, the full-size sedans became offered only as the Ford LTD Crown Victoria and Mercury Grand Marquis. As part of a mid-cycle exterior update, the Granada and Cougar were renamed the Ford LTD and Mercury Marquis. To reverse the sales collapse of both model lines, the Ford Thunderbird and Mercury Cougar (now solely a coupe, replacing the previous XR7) underwent complete exterior redesigns, becoming the first Ford vehicles in North America to feature aerodynamically-enhanced body design.

By 1984, the revision effectively tripled the size of the Lincoln model range, along with eliminating the duplication of several Ford and Mercury vehicles (the Ford Fairmont/Granada and Mercury Zephyr/Cougar sedan and wagon).

=== SN-95 ===
By the early 1990s, the Ford Mustang had become the sole model produced on the Fox platform. For the 1994 model year, as the Mustang underwent a major redesign (under the body family program code name Fox-4), the Fox platform itself saw major changes to its architecture. As part of the upgrade, most of its parts were redesigned carrying over only the floor pan and front suspension cross member with major changes to the suspension and improvements to noise, vibration, and harshness (NVH); the updated Mustang-specific platform became known as the SN-95 platform.

The 2003–2004 Mustang SVT Cobra became the ultimate development of the Fox/SN95 platform, with a 390 hp supercharged 4.6 L DOHC V8. The SN95 platform would be produced for 11 years, extending the life of the Fox platform to 26 years of production. For 2005, the Mustang was completely redesigned, using the all-new Ford D2C platform.

== Discontinuation ==
As the company entered the 1980s, Ford became part of a growing trend among automobile manufacturers using front-wheel drive in its vehicles. For 1984, Ford replaced the Fairmont and Zephyr with the front-wheel drive Ford Tempo/Mercury Topaz, using a long-wheelbase of the Ford Escort platform. The 1983 revision of the Mercury Cougar range reverted to its role as a personal coupe (replacing only the 1980-1982 Cougar XR7).

For 1986, the Ford LTD and Mercury Marquis were sold alongside their Ford Taurus and Mercury Sable successors until production ended at the end of 1985. In a quieter change, the Mercury Capri was discontinued; Ford no longer produced the Mustang with a divisional counterpart.

For 1988, the Lincoln Continental became a longer-wheelbase version of the Ford Taurus, ending sedan production on the Fox platform.

Though the two model lines continued with a rear-wheel drive layout, the all-new MN12 platform replaced the Fox architecture for the Ford Thunderbird and Mercury Cougar for 1989; the MN12 design introduced extensive suspension and handling upgrades over the Fox platform. The change left the Lincoln Mark VII (derived from the 1982 Continental; itself, the 1980 Thunderbird) and the Ford Mustang as the final Fox platform vehicles. As the Mark VII was replaced by the Lincoln Mark VIII for 1993, the Mustang became the sole Fox-platform produced by Ford.

In its 1978 form, the Fox platform was retired after the 1993 model year. For the fourth-generation Mustang, the Fox platform was given the SN-95 platform designation, following substantial upgrades across much of its design (largely making it a second generation of the architecture).

== Vehicles ==
In total, fifteen distinct vehicles were produced on the Ford Fox platform, with the Ford Fairmont, Mercury Zephyr, Ford Durango, Ford Mustang SVO, and Continental/Lincoln Mark VII produced exclusively on the architecture. The platform would be produced in a variety of body styles, including two-door and four-door sedans, two-door coupes, three-door hatchbacks, five-door station wagons, two-door convertibles (marking the return of the bodystyle to Ford), and a two-door coupe utility (the last coupe utility produced by Ford in North America).

Vehicle name	Image	Model years	Predecessor	Successor	Wheelbase	Notes
Fox-platform vehicles (compact)
Ford Fairmont		1978–1983	Ford Maverick	Ford Tempo	105.5 in (2,680 mm)	
Mercury Zephyr		1978–1983	Mercury Comet	Mercury Topaz	105.5 in (2,680 mm)	
Ford Durango		1981–1982	Ford Ranchero		105.5 in (2,680 mm)	The Durango was a limited-production factory-commissioned conversion of the Ford Fairmont Futura two-door by National Coach Corporation.; Approximately 200 were produced.
Fox-platform vehicles (mid-size)
Ford Granada	1982 Ford Granada wagon	1981–1982	Ford Granada (1975–1980)	Ford LTD	105.5 in (2,680 mm)	The Granada was updated and took on the LTD name for 1983.
Ford LTD	1984 Ford LTD four-door	1983–1986	Ford Granada	Ford Taurus	105.5 in (2,680 mm)	The LTD was an updated version of the 1981–1982 Ford Granada.
Mercury Cougar (fifth generation; sedan/station wagon)		1981–1982	Mercury Monarch	Mercury Marquis	105.5 in (2,680 mm)	Cougar sedan and wagon models were discontinued after the 1982 model year.
Mercury Marquis	1983 Mercury Marquis	1983–1986	Mercury Cougar	Mercury Sable	105.5 in (2,680 mm)	
Lincoln Continental (seventh generation)		1982–1987	Lincoln Versailles	Lincoln Continental (D186)	108.5 in (2,756 mm)	Pre 1986 models were marketed only as Continentals with no Lincoln vin or nameplate.
Fox-platform vehicles (Pony car)
Ford Mustang		1979–1993	Ford Mustang II	Ford Mustang (SN-95)	100.5 in (2,553 mm)	
Ford Mustang SVO		1984–1986		Ford Mustang SVT Cobra (1993)	100.5 in (2,553 mm)	Ford Mustang with 2.3 L turbocharged engine and suspension, brake, and bodywork modifications.
Ford Mustang (SN-95)		1994–2004	Ford Mustang	Ford Mustang (S197)	101.3 in (2,573 mm)	
Mercury Capri		1979–1986	Capri II		100.5 in (2,553 mm)	Mercury version of Ford Mustang; different rear bodywork from 1983–1986
Fox-platform vehicles (personal luxury car)
Ford Thunderbird (eighth generation)		1980–1982	Ford Thunderbird (seventh generation)		108.5 in (2,756 mm)	First Thunderbird produced with 6-cylinder engine as standard.
Ford Thunderbird (ninth generation)		1983–1988		Ford Thunderbird (tenth generation / MN-12)	104.2 in (2,647 mm)	Turbo Coupe is first four-cylinder Thunderbird.
Mercury Cougar XR7 (fifth generation)		1980–1982	Mercury Cougar (1977–1979)		108.5 in (2,756 mm)	Separate wheelbase and bodyshell from Cougar sedan/station wagon; same powertrains as Ford Thunderbird.
Mercury Cougar (sixth generation)		1983–1988		Mercury Cougar (seventh generation / MN-12)	104.2 in (2,647 mm)	Return to single model line; Cougar XR7 is sold as Mercury version of Thunderbird Turbo Coupe from 1983–1986, replaced with V8 engine in 1987.
Continental Mark VII and Lincoln Mark VII		1984–1992	Continental Mark VI	Lincoln Mark VIII	108.5 in (2,756 mm)	The Mark VII was the first American-market car sold with composite headlamps and anti-lock brakes.

Ford Motor Company Fox platform timeline
Type	1970s		1980s										1990s										2000s
Type	8	9	0	1	2	3	4	5	6	7	8	9	0	1	2	3	4	5	6	7	8	9	0	1	2	3	4
Compact	Ford Fairmont
Compact	Mercury Zephyr
Pickup				Ford Durango
Mid-size				Ford Granada (second generation)		Ford LTD (fourth generation)
Mid-size				Mercury Cougar (fifth generation)		Mercury Marquis (fourth generation)
Mid-size					Lincoln Continental (seventh generation)
Pony car		Ford Mustang (third generation)															Ford Mustang (fourth generation)
Pony car		Mercury Capri (second generation)
Personal luxury			Ford Thunderbird (eighth generation)			Ford Thunderbird (ninth generation)
Personal luxury			Mercury Cougar XR7			Mercury Cougar (sixth generation)
Personal luxury							Continental Mark VII / Lincoln Mark VII
