= Ford Thunderbird (ninth generation) =

Ninth generation of the Ford Thunderbird

Ford Thunderbird Ninth generation
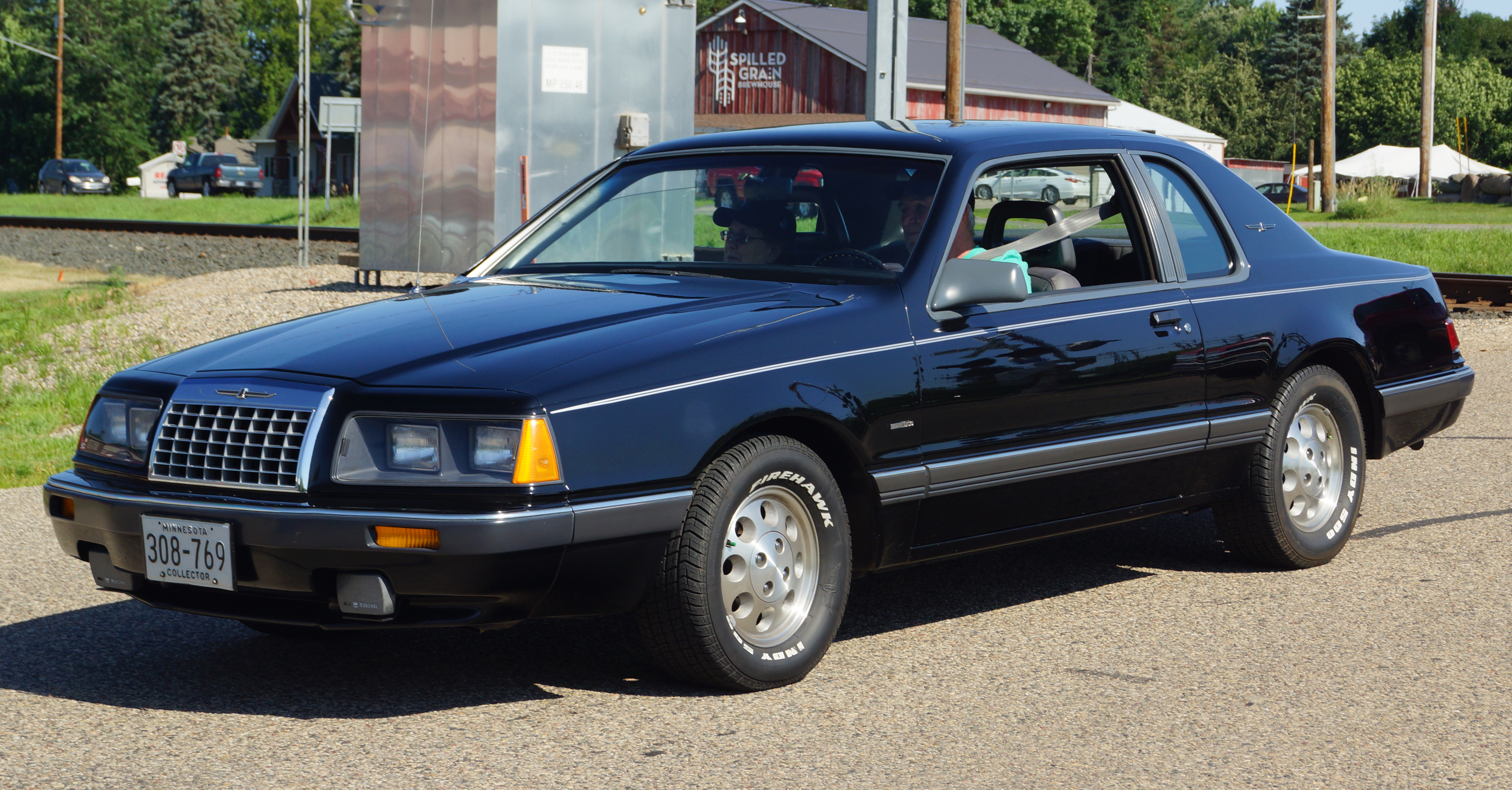
- 1984 Thunderbird Turbo Coupe

Overview
- Manufacturer: Ford Motor Company
- Production: 1982–1988
- Model years: 1983–1988
- Assembly: United States: Lorain, Ohio; Hapeville, Georgia
- Designer: Dave Royer under Jack Telnack

Body and chassis
- Class: Personal luxury car
- Body style: 2-door coupe
- Layout: Front-engine, rear-wheel-drive
- Platform: Ford Fox
- Related: Mercury Cougar; Lincoln Mark VII

Powertrain
- Engine: 2.3 L Lima turbo I4; 3.8 L Essex V6; 5.0 L Windsor V8
- Transmission: 3-speed Ford C3 automatic; 4-speed A4LD automatic; 3-speed Ford C5 automatic; 4-speed Ford AOD automatic; 5-speed Borg-Warner T-5 manual

Dimensions
- Wheelbase: 104.2 in (2,647 mm)
- Length: 1983–1986: 197.6 in (5,019 mm); 1987–1988: 202.1 in (5,133 mm)
- Width: 71.1 in (1,806 mm)
- Height: 1983–1986: 53.2 in (1,351 mm); 1987–1988: 53.4 in (1,356 mm)

Chronology
- Predecessor: Ford Thunderbird (eighth generation)
- Successor: Ford Thunderbird (tenth generation)

The ninth generation of the Ford Thunderbird is a personal luxury coupe that was manufactured and marketed by Ford for the 1983 to 1988 model years. In response to the sales downturn of the 1980–1982 Thunderbird, the model line underwent one of its most substantial redesigns for the 1983 model year. While the Thunderbird remained as a personal luxury coupe (to minimize overlap with the Ford Mustang), Ford transitioned its role, emphasizing performance and handling over outright luxury and comfort content. As a design leader for Ford, the ninth-generation Thunderbird marked the introduction of highly aerodynamic body design for Ford vehicles in North America (reducing its drag coefficient from 0.50 to 0.35), followed by the 1984 Ford Mustang SVO and Ford Tempo and the 1986 Ford Aerostar and Ford Taurus.

Sharing the Ford Fox platform with the previous generation, the 1983 Thunderbird adopted a shortened 104.2-inch (2,647 mm) wheelbase. Sharing a chassis with the Mercury Cougar (replacing the previous Cougar XR7, offered solely as a coupe), the Thunderbird was also a counterpart of the Continental/Lincoln Mark VII (1984-1992). The 4.9L V8 (marketed as a 5.0L by Ford) made its return in 1983, alongside the debut of the first and only four-cylinder Thunderbird. Featuring a variant of the Mustang SVO drivetrain, the 2.3-liter Thunderbird Turbo Coupe was designed as the high-performance flagship of the model line for the entire generation.

As with its predecessor, the ninth-generation Ford Thunderbird was produced in Atlanta Assembly and Lorain Assembly (in Hapeville, Georgia, and Lorain, Ohio, respectively). For the 1989 model year, this generation was replaced by the tenth-generation Ford Thunderbird, as the model line shifted from the Fox platform to the MN12 platform.

== Development ==
Sales of the 1980 Thunderbird decreased sharply in comparison to its 1977–1979 predecessor, despite being a more fuel-efficient vehicle. As the 1970s turned into the 1980s, personal luxury cars gradually became more sporting in image, with vehicles like the BMW 6-Series increasing in popularity. In 1980, Ford President Donald Petersen asked Ford Vice President of Design Jack Telnack of the 1980 Thunderbird: "is this what you would want in your driveway?". Telnack's negative response prompted the company to request the Thunderbird to be restyled completely.

The Continental Concept 90 Aero Luxury Car proposal was designed in the Lincoln-Mercury Studio which Mr. Petersen liked. Dave Royer was assigned the task of putting a design similar to that on the Thunderbird package. He and Master Modeler Sam Borg put the clay model together in a very short period of time. Caldwell approved it and Royer then developed it further in the wind tunnel. Many members of design management thought it was a mistake; one high level design management person referred to it as a "Burnt Tennis Shoe."

To give the car a more contemporary image, the body was completely redesigned from the ground up. Aside from the egg-crate grille and the Thunderbird emblem (which were both significantly updated), no styling cues were carried over. As a necessity to control development costs, the 1983 Thunderbird was forced to retain its Fox-platform chassis, including some of the interior being carried over slightly modified from the previous generation. In the style of the Ford Probe concept cars and the 1982 Ford Sierra, the Thunderbird was designed for aerodynamic efficiency alongside its looks, with many of its body panels having rounded edges and its doors wrapping into the roof. In extreme contrast to its predecessors of the late 1970s, the 1983 Thunderbird was designed to minimize the use of chrome trim; some trim levels limited it exclusively to the wheels. The car was launched on February 17, 1982.

== Model year changes ==
=== 1983–1986 ===
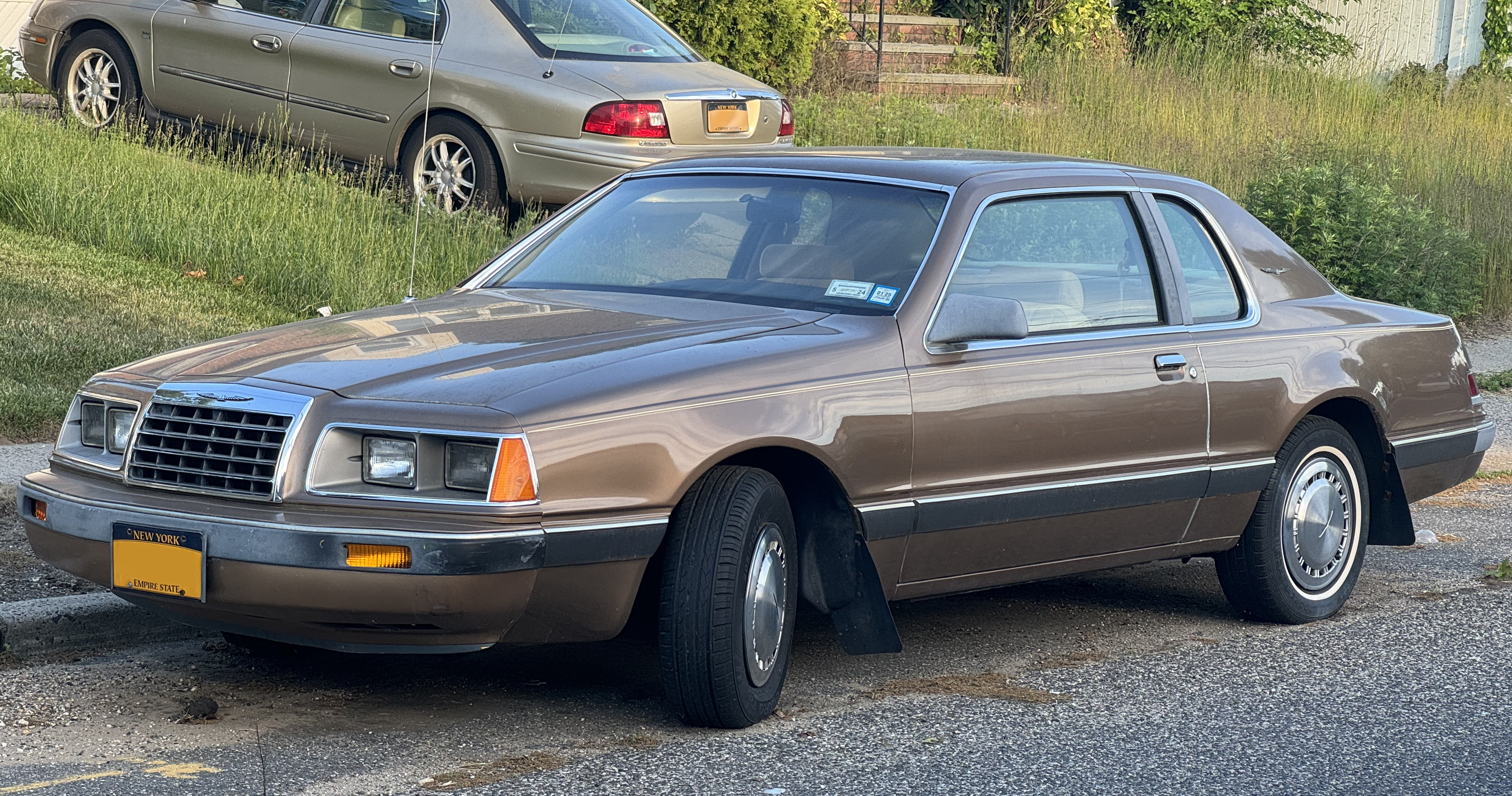
1985 Ford Thunderbird

Following its redesign for the 1983 model year, the Thunderbird was available in base, Heritage, or Turbo Coupe, which was the most expensive performance-oriented model. Both the base and the Heritage came standard with a 3.8 L (232 cu in) Essex V6 that was rated at 110 horsepower (82 kW) mated to a three-speed automatic transmission. A 5.0 L (302 cu in) Windsor V8 with 140 horsepower (100 kW) was available with the former two models as well. The Turbo Coupe, the top-of-the-line model was special for several reasons. It used a turbocharged 2.3 L (140 cu in) four-cylinder engine with Ford's EEC-IV electronic engine control system. Unlike the other models, the Turbo Coupe came with a standard five-speed manual transmission, which had not been offered since 1960. Other improvements included a limited-slip differential (called "Traction-Lok"), larger tires and wheels, and a sportier interior complete with analog gauges.

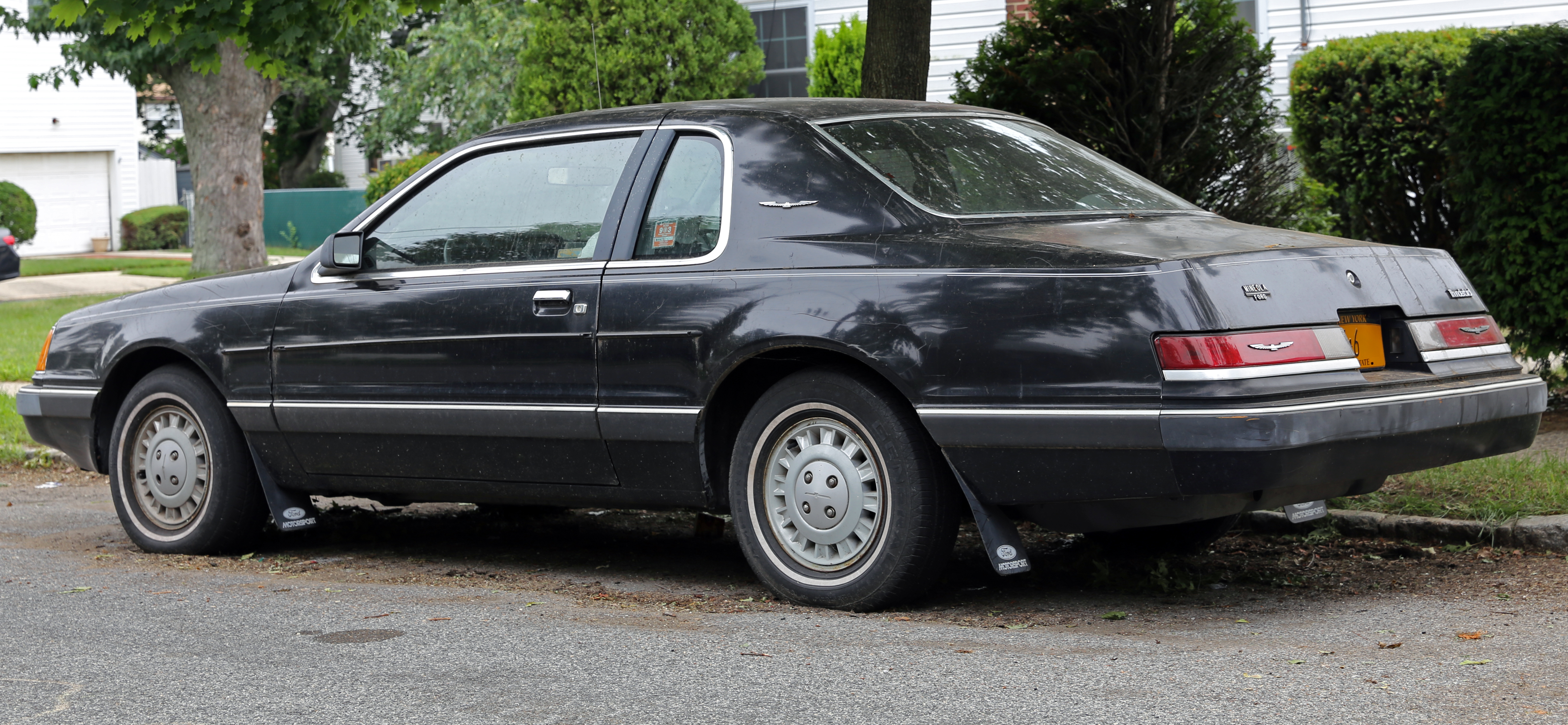
1985–1986 Ford Thunderbird (rear view)

For the 1984 model year, few changes were made. The Turbo Coupe gained a three-speed automatic transmission as an option. A Fila model was introduced, which featured two-tone white and gray paint with red and blue pinstriping, white leather interior, and wheel choices, as well as Fila logo badges. The mid-range Heritage model was renamed élan.

For 1985, the Thunderbird celebrated its 30th year in the Ford model lineup; a 30th Anniversary Edition model was offered, that featured unique blue paint and stripes, and came loaded with options. It was loosely based on the élan trim and most examples were equipped with the 5.0-liter V8. All Thunderbirds received an updated interior with a redesigned instrument panel. The grille and taillamps were also revised. Engine output rating increased to 155 hp (116 kW) for the Turbo Coupe.

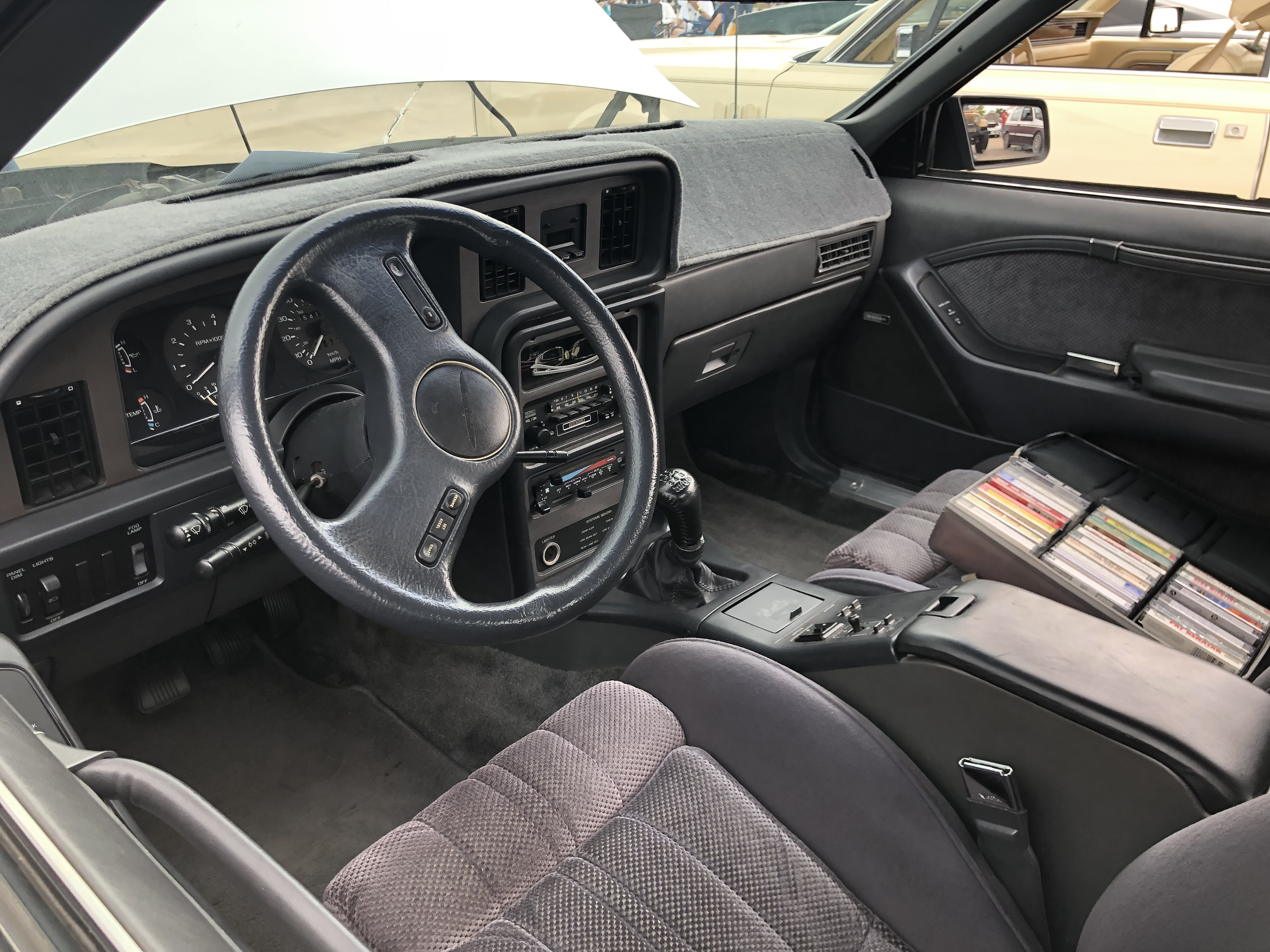
Ford Thunderbird Turbo Coupe interior

From 1985, Georgia-based dealership Bill Elliot Ford started producing special dealer packages for the Thunderbird which consisted of a ground effects body kit, rear spoiler, gold body stripes and gold-coloured honeycomb alloy wheels. Although not owned by famed race driver Bill Elliot, the dealership wore his name and produced the cars in honor of his contemporary achievements in racing as a way to boost sales, such as the 1986 Talladega T-Bird with the aforementioned features.

Minor changes were made in 1986, including the addition of a center high mount stop lamp, and the deletion of the FILA edition. In 1986, Ford began work on the "MN12" project which would serve as the basis for an all-new Thunderbird generation. Supposed to compete against the BMW 6-Series, Ford believed that the new Thunderbird would be too big a change for the public and still wanted to capitalize on the success that the existing generation of Thunderbirds had brought.

=== 1987–1988 ===
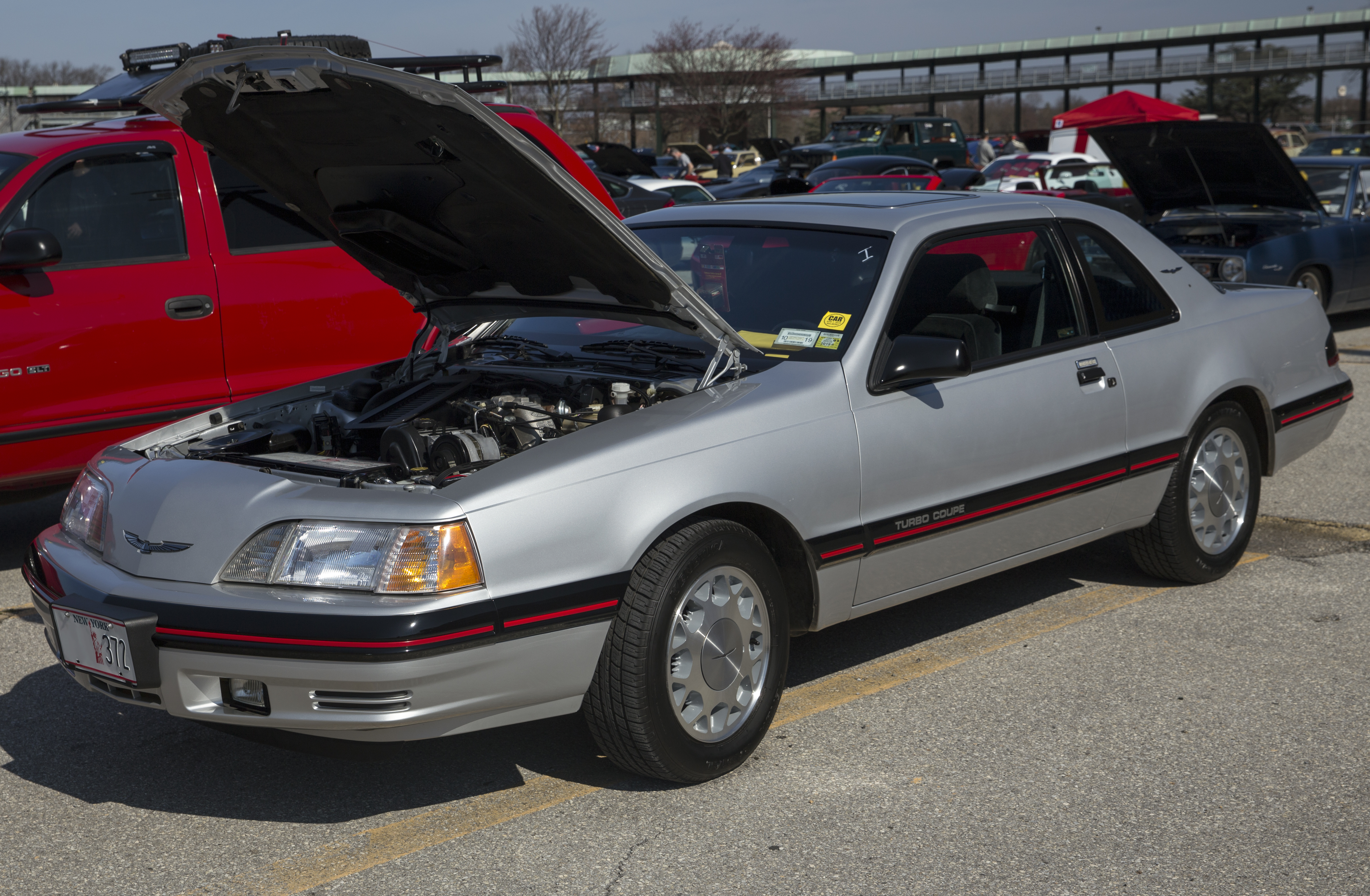
1987 Ford Thunderbird Turbo Coupe

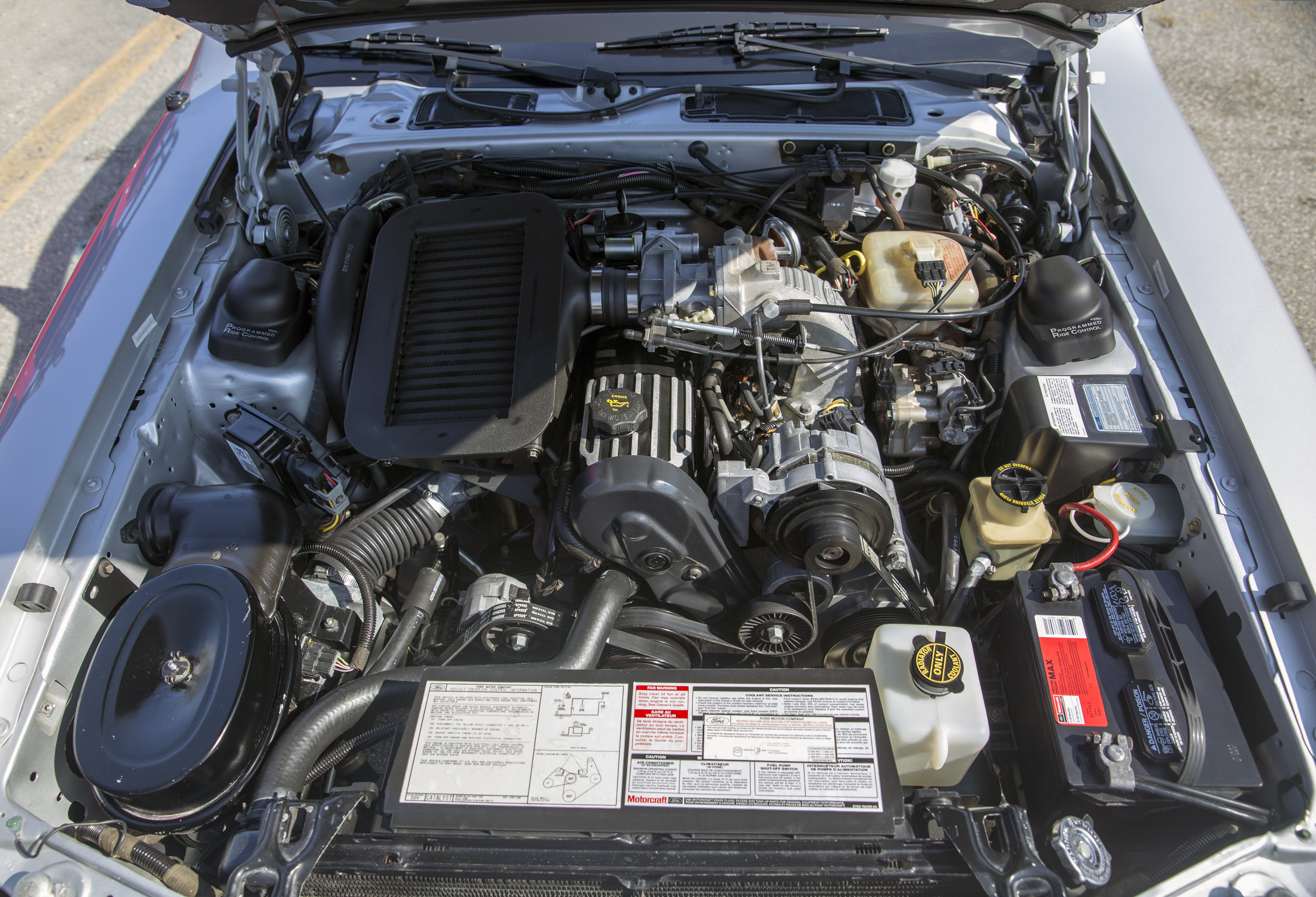
The 2.3-litre turbocharged 4-cylinder engine of the Turbo Coupe

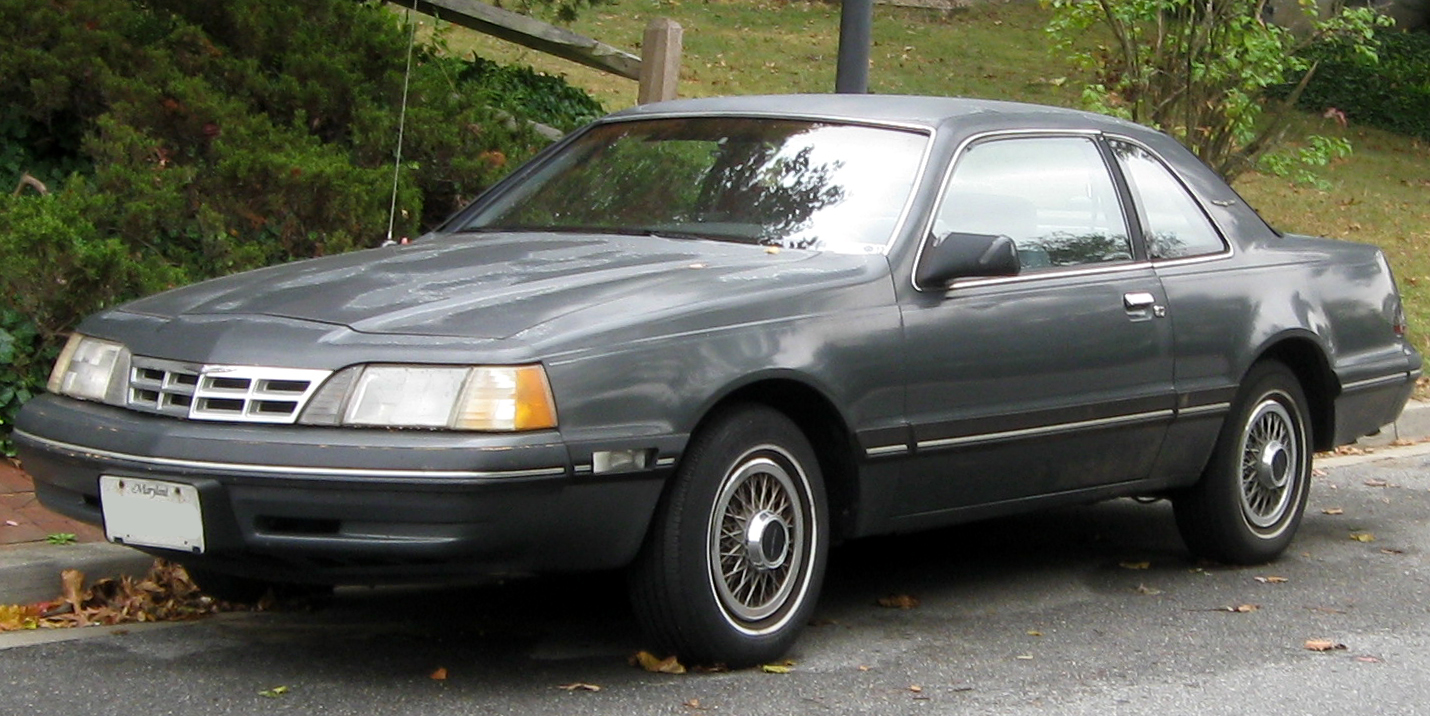
1987–1988 Ford Thunderbird LX

For the 1987 model year, the exterior of the Thunderbird was updated to further improve its aerodynamic performance. The headlights were changed from sealed-beam units to flush-mounted composite units and the rear quarter glass was also flush-mounted. Thunderbird Turbo Coupes were distinguished by their own front bodywork, which did away with a traditional front grille, featuring functional hood scoops directed to the intercooler. In sharp contrast to the Thunderbirds of a decade before, chrome trim was used only sparingly; on Turbo Coupes, the only chrome trim on the entire car was the Thunderbird emblems and lettering. The model lineup was further changed; to bring the Thunderbird in line with other Ford models, the élan trim was dropped, replaced with LX and Sport versions. The LX was equipped with the V6 while the Sport was equipped with the V8.

Turbo Coupes gained an intercooler, essentially giving the car the powertrain of the Mustang SVO. Models with the five-speed manual were given a power increase to 190 hp (142 kW), making them capable of attaining a top speed of 143 mph (230 km/h). Models with the four-speed automatic transmission (new for 1987) were detuned to 150 hp (112 kW) in the interest of transmission durability; turbocharger boost was reduced to 9.5 psi (65 kPa or 0.65 bar) instead of 10-15 psi (70 to 100 kPa or 0.7 to 1 bar). Turbo Coupes were equipped with anti-lock disc brakes on all wheels, Automatic Ride Control, and 16-inch 225/60VR performance tires. The Turbo Coupe also featured a performance-styled front valance with fog lights and special trim with "Turbo Coupe" badges on the doors, as well as "Snowflake" 16 inch alloy wheels. The Thunderbird Turbo Coupe was named the Motor Trend Car of the Year for 1987. 1988, the final year for the Turbo Coupe, saw only minor changes. The five-speed manual transmission now allowed the full 15 psi of boost in all forward gears (as opposed to excluding the upper three gears). The Turbo Coupe was replaced in 1989 by the Super Coupe which had a 3.8 L supercharged V6 engine — a radical departure from the old turbo four-cylinder.

Two special editions were released in 1988: the Mach 1 Edition Turbo Coupe and the Bill Elliot Signature Edition. The Mach 1 Edition Turbo Coupe was produced in 500 examples and was available in bright red only with a rear spoiler, while a total of 50 Bill Elliot Signature Editions celebrated NASCAR driver Bill Elliot's racing efforts and featured red upper and silver lower paint, a V8 engine, tape stripes and an aerodynamic body kit including a rear deck wing and special wheels.

== Production totals ==
| Year | Production |
| 1983 | 121,999 |
| 1984 | 170,551 |
| 1985 | 151,852 |
| 1986 | 165,965 |
| 1987 | 128,135 |
| 1988 | 147,243 |
| Total | 885,745 |
