= Lincoln Continental Mark VII =

Lincoln Continental Mark VII Lincoln Mark VII
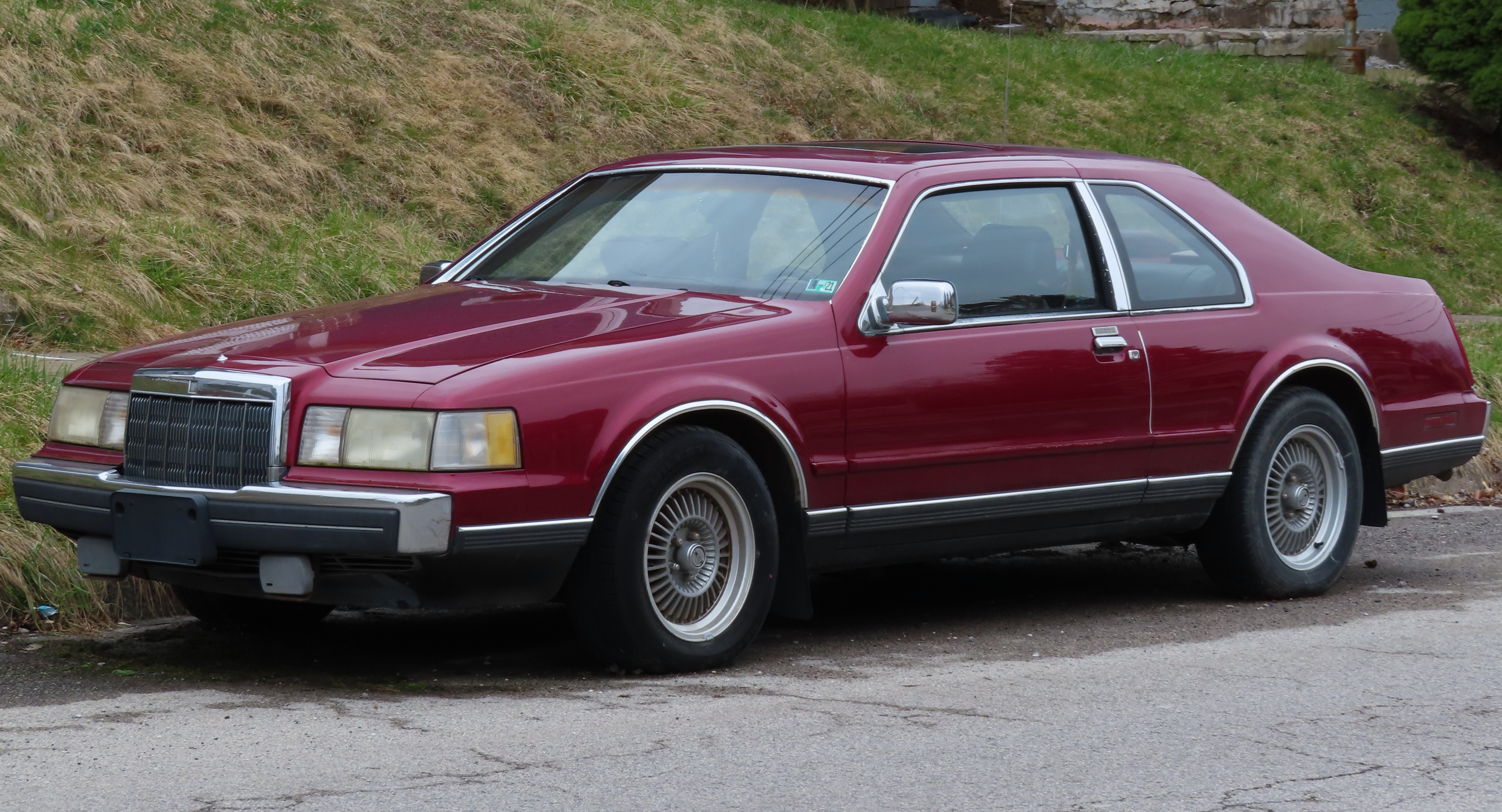
- Lincoln Mark VII LSC

Overview
- Manufacturer: Lincoln (Ford)
- Production: August 1983 – April 1992
- Model years: 1984–1992
- Assembly: United States: Wixom, Michigan (Wixom Assembly)
- Designer: Jeff Teague

Body and chassis
- Class: Personal luxury car
- Body style: 2-door coupe
- Layout: FR layout
- Platform: Ford Fox platform
- Related: Ford Mustang; Ford Thunderbird; Mercury Cougar

Powertrain
- Engine: 4,942 cc (302 cu in) Windsor V8; 2,443 cc (149 cu in) BMW M21 TD I6
- Transmission: 4-speed AOD automatic 4-speed ZF automatic

Dimensions
- Wheelbase: 108.5 in (2,756 mm)
- Length: 202.8 in (5,151 mm)
- Width: 70.9 in (1,801 mm)
- Height: 54.2 in (1,377 mm)
- Curb weight: 3,748 lb (1,700 kg)

Chronology
- Predecessor: Continental Mark VI
- Successor: Lincoln Mark VIII

The Continental Mark VII, later changed to Lincoln Mark VII, is a rear wheel drive luxury coupe that was produced by Lincoln. Introduced in August 1983 for the 1984 model year, the Continental Mark VII shared the Ford Fox platform with the Ford Thunderbird, Mercury Cougar, and Lincoln Continental, the platform having been introduced for the 1978 Ford Fairmont and Mercury Zephyr and used for the 1982–1987 Lincoln Continental sedan and Mark VII four-door. Like its predecessor the Continental Mark VI, the Mark VII was manufactured at the Wixom Assembly Plant in Wixom, Michigan through 1992. It was replaced by the Lincoln Mark VIII in 1993.

The Mark VII featured standard equipment including an onboard trip computer / message center and digital instruments (on all except the LSC models after 1985), and four wheel air suspension. The 1985 LSC was the first American vehicle with electronic 4-channel anti-lock brakes.

== Continental Mark VII (1984–1985) ==
The Continental Mark VII was introduced in August 1983 for the 1984 model year. It was available in a base trim level, Designer Edition (Bill Blass Edition and Versace Edition). A new sport-oriented upper trim level was introduced with this generation, marketed as the LSC (Luxury Sports Coupe). Alongside the standard 140 hp 5.0L V8 shared with the Ford Mustang is a 114 hp 2.4L turbocharged diesel inline-6 obtained from BMW to offer a more fuel efficient engine offering; all Mark VIIs came with a 4-speed automatic transmission.

The Mark VII featured standard equipment including a fully digital dashboard, onboard trip computer, message center, automatic climate control four-wheel air suspension, four-wheel disc brakes, sensitivity adjustable automatic dimming high-beam lights and AM/FM stereo — as well as power seats, windows, locks, mirrors, deck-lid release and trunk lid pull-down, where the last movement of the closing trunk lid was power assisted. All models now featured Ford's proprietary door-mounted keypad entry system marketed as Securicode.

The Mark VII was the first modern American manufactured vehicle to be equipped with a replaceable bulb headlamp system. Ford had petitioned NHTSA for a rule change permitting replaceable bulb headlamp systems, which was enacted in the summer of 1983 in time for the introduction of the Mark VII. The 1985 model year was the last for the Mark Series to include the "Continental" name as its nomenclature. That same year, the dealer-installed GTC performance option package was introduced (see below). As they had largely been replaced by cassette tapes, the 8-track tape player option was discontinued. An in-car telephone was also added to the options list for $2,995 ($9,281 in 2025 dollars).

== Lincoln Mark VII (1986–1992) ==
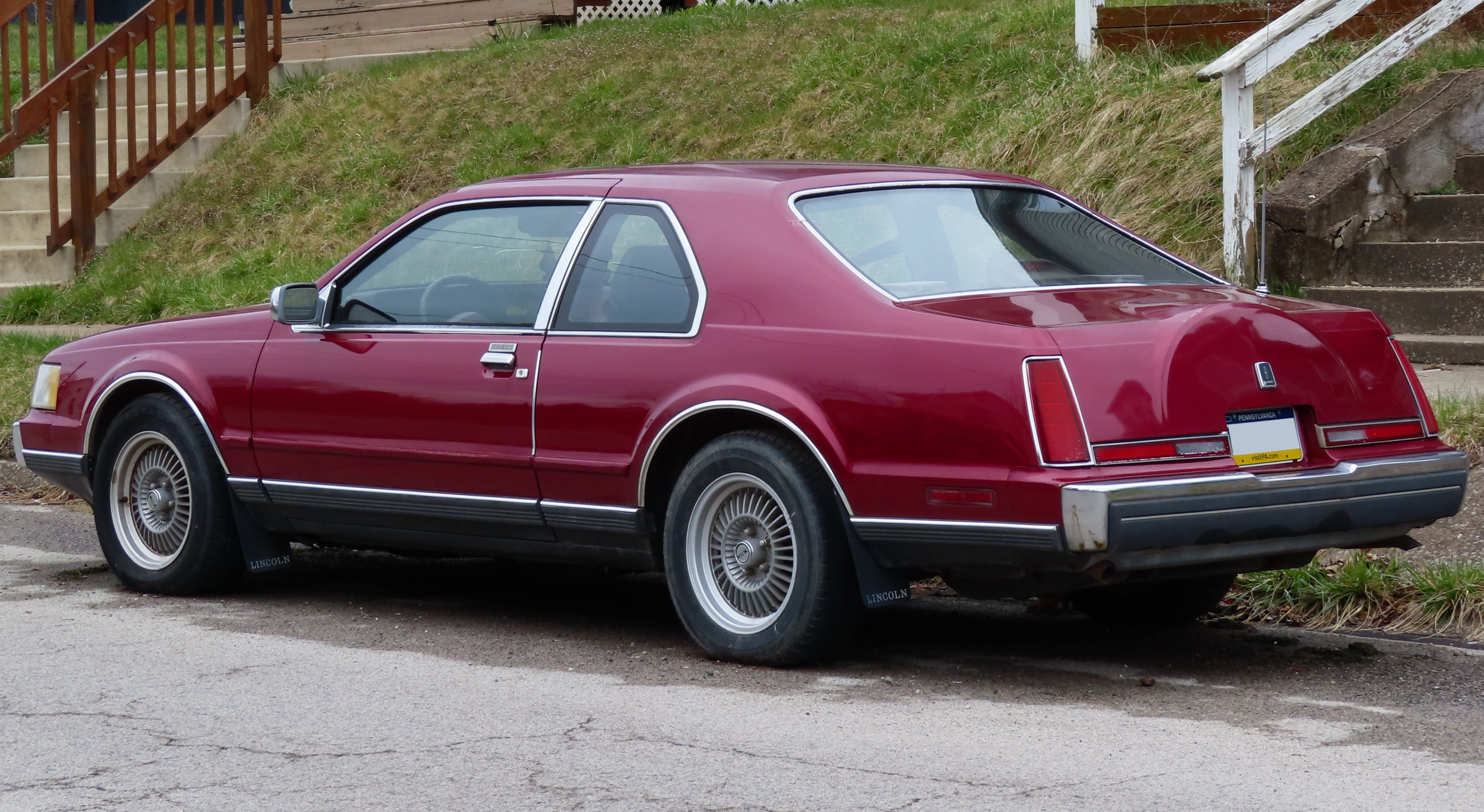
1989 Lincoln Mark VII LSC rear view

For 1986, the Mark series was integrated into the Lincoln brand after being within the Continental marque for 18 years, ending the naming confusion. The Continental Mark VII was renamed the Lincoln Mark VII and given Lincoln badges with the first three digits of the VIN changed from 1MR Continental to 1LN Lincoln. Other visual changes involved the addition of a federally mandated center brake light (CHMSL). The rarely-seen BMW diesel was dropped from the line, as was the Versace Edition. A number of changes were made for the LSC for 1986 to differentiate it from the rest of the Mark VII line. To update its performance image, the 1986 LSC was given analog gauges in place of the all-digital dash; the engine output increased to 200 hp. Largely unchanged from 1986, a running change late in 1987 production added the 225 hp 5.0L "H.O." to a limited number of LSC models. 1987 would be the last year the Mark VII offered an optional CB radio. Since vent windows had all but disappeared on American automobiles by the 1980s, the option for them was discontinued for 1987.

For 1988, the Mark VII model line was revised. As the Mark VII carried a large list of features, the base-trim model was discontinued, leaving the luxury-oriented Bill Blass Edition and the performance-oriented LSC; both versions were priced the same. The 150 hp and 200 hp versions of the 5.0L V8 were replaced by the 225 hp "H.O." version; shared with the Mustang GT, it was sold in both Bill Blass and LSC Mark VIIs. On LSC models, wheel size was increased to 16 inches. For 1989, relatively few changes were made to the Mark VII. To improve the handling of LSC models, Lincoln made changes to the steering. The 1989 model was the last year with a hood ornament.

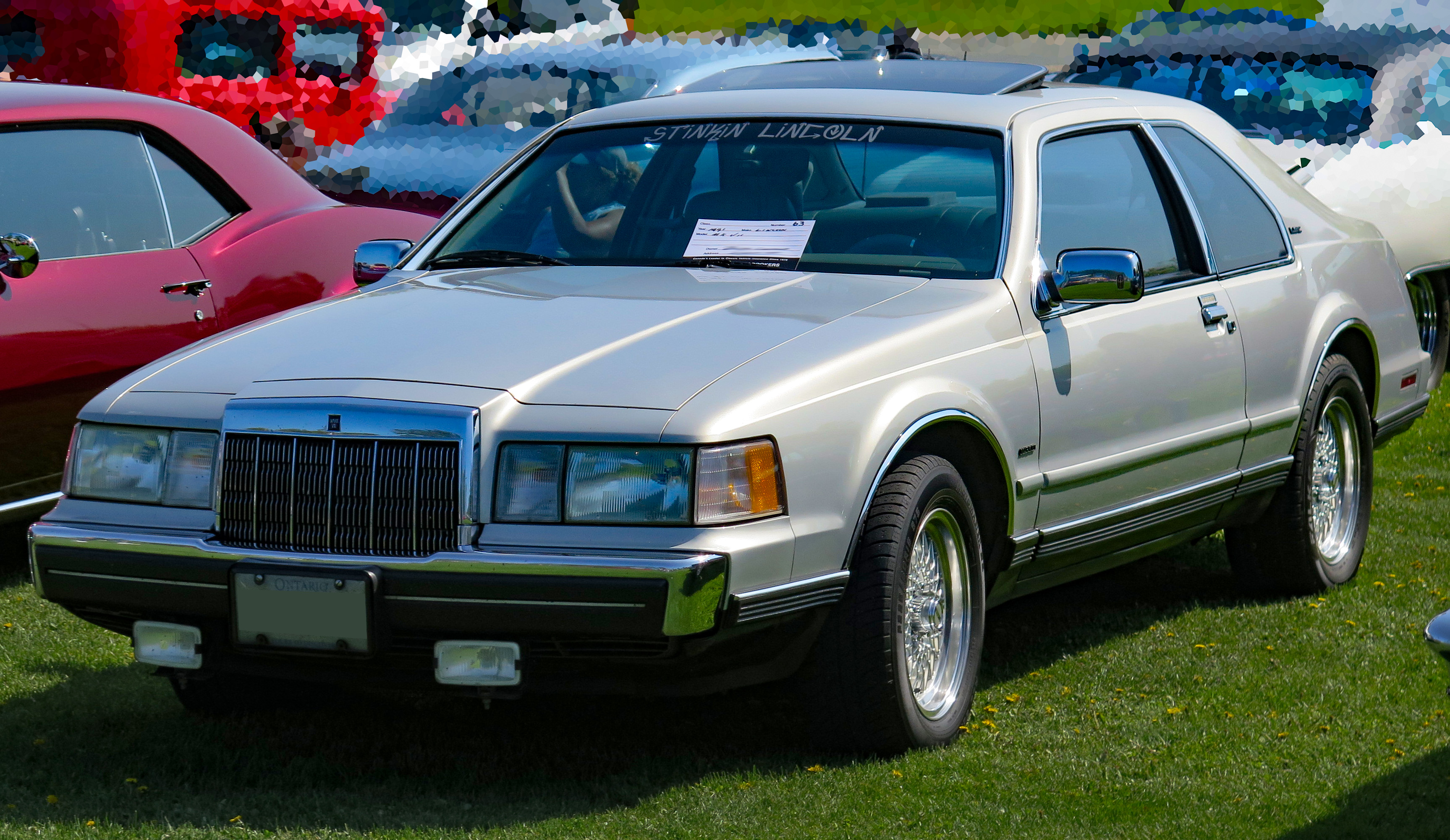
1991 Lincoln Mark VII LSC

For 1990, to accommodate passive-restraint regulations, the Mark VII was given a driver-side airbag and three-point seatbelts were added to the outboard rear seats. Since it had not been updated since 1984, the dashboard and interior controls were given a redesign; LSC models saw the addition of a 120-mph speedometer. LSC models were given 16-inch wheels with a design that was essentially a clone of the BBS RA wheel. To give new life to the Mark VII, the monochromatic LSC SE (Special Edition) was introduced.

For 1991, the Mark VII line was consolidated mechanically, as the Bill Blass Edition adopted the suspension and wheels of the LSC; the Bill Blass Edition was largely differentiated by its use of a digital dashboard. Both versions were given redesigned seats (distinguished by lower headrests). For 1992, the Mark VII saw no major changes from 1991. A new color, Deep Jewel Green Metallic Clearcoat, was introduced; few were produced and surviving examples are very rare. A total of 190,832 Mark VIIs were produced.

== Variants ==
=== Aftermarket ===
The Mark VII GTC was a Lincoln-Mercury dealer-sold car built by Cars & Concepts with monochromatic paint, a body kit, and available performance upgrades. A select few were sent to Jack Roush Performance for suspension enhancements and optional 5.8L and T5 manual transmission conversions. There was also a 'Comtech' Mark VII, with a CRT touch screen, which did exist in at least one vehicle, it was on loan to Bob Bondurant while he had his driving school at Sears Point Raceway. Ford Motor Company allowed him to have a fleet of new vehicles every year, and one of Bob's choices was the Comtech Mark VII. Larry Albedi Motors (Lincoln-Mercury) in Vallejo, California, serviced the vehicle a couple of times before it was returned to Ford at the end of the year. The Comtech parts that were unique to that Mark VII were also listed in the Lincoln Mercury parts catalog, but when the Merkur arrived the Comtech pages were removed and the Merkur pages replaced them. The Comtech model being a prototype, they saw no reason to keep it in the parts catalog.

== Powertrain ==
The engine choices were a 5.0 L V8 and rare (approximately 2,300 made) 2.4 L I6 diesel. The diesel was a BMW design with a turbocharger and only available in 1984 and 1985. At least one diesel Mark VII was reportedly equipped with a 5-speed manual transmission.

Engine	MY, trim	Engine displacement, configuration	Fuel system	Maximum horsepower (@RPM)	Maximum Torque (@RPM)	Transmission
BMW M21	1984–1985	2,443 cc (149 cu in) turbocharged inline-six	Diesel	115 hp (86 kW) at 4,800 rpm	155 lb⋅ft (210 N⋅m) at 2,400 rpm	4-speed ZF automatic
Ford Windsor	1984–1985	4,942 cc (302 cu in) V8	CFI	140 hp (104 kW) at 3,200 rpm	250 lb⋅ft (339 N⋅m) at 1,600 rpm	4-speed Ford AOD automatic
Ford Windsor	1986–1987	4,942 cc (302 cu in) V8	EFI	150 hp (112 kW) at 3,200 rpm	270 lb⋅ft (366 N⋅m) at 2,000 rpm	4-speed Ford AOD automatic
Ford Windsor	1986–1987 (LSC)	4,942 cc (302 cu in) V8	SEFI	200 hp (149 kW) at 4,000 rpm	285 lb⋅ft (386 N⋅m) at 3,000 rpm	4-speed Ford AOD automatic
Ford Windsor	1988–1992	4,942 cc (302 cu in) V8	SEFI	225 hp (168 kW) at 4,200 rpm	300 lb⋅ft (407 N⋅m) at 3,200 rpm	4-speed Ford AOD automatic
	Source:					

== Production ==
1984–1992 Continental/Lincoln Mark VII production
Year	Mark VIIs produced
1984	33,344
1985	18,355
1986	20,056
1987	15,286
1988	38,259
1989	28,607
1990	22,313
1991	8,880
1992	5,732
Total	190,832

== Racing ==
The Mark VII was raced in the Trans-Am Series in 1984 and 1985 without much success, with the best result being a ninth-place finish.

== Awards ==
The Mark VII LSC was on Car and Driver magazine's Ten Best list for 1986.
