= Ford Essex V6 engine (Canadian) =

Ford Essex V6 (Canadian)
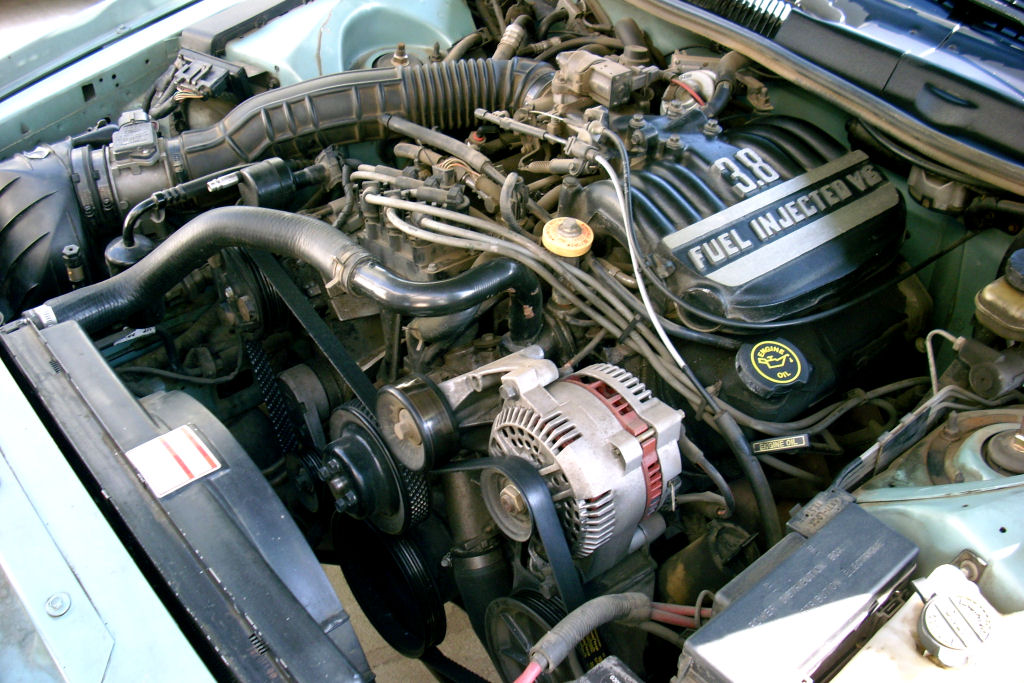
- 3.8 L Essex V6 in a 1994 Ford Thunderbird LX

Overview
- Manufacturer: Ford Motor Company
- Production: 1981–2007

Layout
- Configuration: 90° V6
- Displacement: 3,797 cc (231.7 cu in); 3,886 cc (237.1 cu in); 4,195 cc (256.0 cu in)
- Cylinder bore: 96.8 mm (3.81 in)
- Piston stroke: 86 mm (3.39 in); 88 mm (3.46 in); 95 mm (3.74 in)
- Cylinder block material: Cast iron
- Cylinder head material: Aluminum
- Valvetrain: 2 overhead valves per cylinder, pushrods, rocker arms.
- Compression ratio: 8.6:1–9.0:1 (Original); 8.2:1–8.6:1 (Supercharged); 9.2:1–9.3:1 (SPI)

Combustion
- Supercharger: Eaton M90 Roots-type (in 1989–1995 Thunderbird SC and 1989–90 Cougar XR-7)
- Fuel system: 2-barrel carburetor; Central Fuel Injection; Sequential fuel injection
- Fuel type: Gasoline
- Oil system: Wet sump
- Cooling system: Liquid-cooled

Chronology
- Successor: Ford Cyclone engine

The Essex V6 is a 90° V6 engine family built by the Ford Motor Company at the Essex Engine Plant in Windsor, Ontario, Canada. This engine is unrelated to Ford's British Essex V6. Introduced in 1982, versions of the Essex V6 engine family were used in subcompact through to large cars, vans, minivans, and some pickup trucks. The Essex V6 was last used in the 2008 regular-cab F-150, after which it was succeeded by a version of the Ford Cyclone engine. An industrial version of the engine was available until 2015.

== Design and early production ==
The Essex V6 is an overhead valve (OHV) V6 engine with a 90° angle between cylinder banks, a single cam-in-block, and two valves per cylinder operated by pushrods and rocker arms. Split crankshaft pins permit even firing intervals. Versions of the engine used in front-engine, front-wheel-drive layouts (FWD) have a different bellhousing pattern than those use in front-engine, rear-wheel-drive layouts (RWD).

In 1977 Ford foresaw the need to develop a new engine for use in mid-size cars and light trucks in the 1980s. They began a project to design a V6 engine that would be lightweight, fuel efficient, and reliable. To meet the first criterion, many components were to be made of aluminum, including the intake manifold, front cover, water pump, oil pump, water outlet, rear cover plate, EGR distribution spacer, distributor, carburetor, engine block and cylinder heads. The rocker covers were of glass-filled nylon. The first engines were complete in early 1978 and successfully met all design objectives, but tooling and material cost increases prompted a redesign with a cast iron block while keeping the aluminum heads. Other lightweight features that were deleted in the redesign included a hollow-core crankshaft, stamped steel exhaust manifolds, and an aluminum harmonic balancer and camshaft sprocket. The first cast iron engines were complete by February 1979. Even with the weight increases due to the redesign, it was the lightest V6 engine of any displacement ever built in North America to that time.

The earliest production blocks exhibited a tendency to develop a crack in the camshaft bearing bulkhead that could propagate down to the bearing bore under high speed conditions. The problem, caused by the accelerated cooling of the blocks produced at full production speeds, was solved by increasing the width of the rib. To deal with the 5000 already completed engines that had received the potentially flawed block, Ford ran the engine assembly line backwards, disassembling the engines and stockpiling the internal components. The line was then run forward and the engines were reassembled using the stockpiled components and new engine blocks.

=== SPI ===
In 1996 the Essex V6 received Ford's Split Port Induction (SPI) system, a form of variable-length intake manifold. In this system, the intake port to each intake valve is split into a primary and secondary passage. The primary passage contains the injector for the cylinder, and introduces the air tangentially to the cylinder for maximum swirl. The secondary passage contains an intake manifold runner control (IMRC) deactivation valve which opens for high speed and wide-open throttle (WOT) situations to provide a minimally restricted path for additional air to maximize volumetric efficiency and power.

Other changes that were part of the SPI system included lightweight valves, larger intake valves, revised exhaust ports, revised valve seats, an increased compression ratio, and new cylinder heads that were shared by both the 3.8 L and 4.2 L versions of the Essex V6. The IMRC assembly was likewise shared, while the upper intake manifold differed between the two engine versions.

The addition of the SPI system resulted in a 33% increase in peak power, a 7% increase in peak torque, and a 2% reduction in fuel consumption for the 3.8 L Essex. The 4.2 L saw similar improvements, and its longer stroke and use of longer intake runners resulted in an even greater increase in low speed torque.

== Origin rumors ==
Two rumors about the origin of the Essex V6 engine's design have circulated:

1. That the Essex V6 is a Ford small block V8 engine with two cylinders removed
2. That the Essex V6 is a copy of the Buick V6 engine.

The first claim relies on similarities like the 90° angle between cylinder banks, an OHV valvetrain, and the fact that deducting two cylinders' volume from a 5.0 L V8 results in a V6 displacing in the range of 3.70–3.75 L (226–229 cu in). Although the practice of deriving a V6 from a V8 is not unheard of, there are significant differences between the small block V8 and the Essex V6. The bore and stroke of the V8 are different from those of the Essex V6, as are their bore center spacings, making a common lineage unlikely. Also, while the versions of the Essex V6 used in RWD applications shared their bell housing pattern with the 5.0 L small block V8 engine, the FWD version did not, having a pattern that matched the 3.0 L Vulcan V6 instead.

The second claim is also based on the two engines sharing certain features, including; a short rigid block, but shorter on the Ford and with different bore spacings; similar, but not identical, bore and stroke dimensions; similar rods and mains dimensions; a rolled radius on the mains; split rod pins for even firing intervals on the 90° block, although with different bobweight percentages.

In a paper published in the Society of Automotive Engineers SAE Transactions detailing the origin and development of the Essex V6, there are several places where either the Ford 5.0 L V8 or a "competitive 3.8L V6" are mentioned, usually to serve as a contrast to a feature of the Essex V6. Under "Engine Test & Development", the article mentions that the engine's basic design assumptions were demonstrated using "competitive V6 engines" as well as the Ford 5.0 L V8 modified to operate as a 90° V6, but does not indicate that the Essex V6 was directly based on either of these proof-of-concept test engines. Instead, the article describes the Essex V6 as "an all-new lightweight 90° V6 engine".

== 3.8 L ==
The first Essex V6 released was a 3.8 L version introduced for the 1982 model year as an option on the Ford Granada.

Bore and stroke were 96.8 mm × 86 mm (3.81 in × 3.39 in), for a total displacement of 3,797 cc (231.7 cu in). Output was 112 hp (84 kW) at 4200 rpm and 175 lb⋅ft (237 N⋅m) of torque at 2800 rpm. Most early engines had a 2-barrel Motorcraft 2150 carburetor, while 50-state Lincoln Continentals and California Granada-Cougar-Thunderbird-XR7 cars got Ford's Motorcraft 7200 carburetor with variable venturi. Central Fuel Injection became available in 1984, raising output to 120 hp (89 kW) at 3600 rpm and 205 lb⋅ft (278 N⋅m) of torque at 1600 rpm in models so equipped.

Multi-point fuel injection (single port) became standard on the 3.8 L V6 in 1988, raising power and torque to 140 hp (104 kW) at 3800 rpm and 215 lb⋅ft (292 N⋅m) of torque at 2400 rpm. Engines upgraded with Ford's EEC-V Powertrain control module (PCM) received a small increase in output to 155 hp (116 kW), if they did not have other enhancements to increase output beyond this already. The 1991–1995 Police Package Taurus, 1991–1994 Lincoln Continental and 1995 Ford Windstar had a high-output version of the 3.8 L with better cylinder heads and other modifications that produced 155–160 hp (116–119 kW) and 220–225 lb⋅ft (298–305 N⋅m) of torque depending on application and model year.

A 3.8 L V6 with SPI was introduced in the 1996 Windstar. With a compression ratio of 9.3:1, this engine was rated at 200 hp (149 kW) at 5000 rpm and 230 lb⋅ft (312 N⋅m) of torque at 3000 rpm. The upper intake manifold has a sticker located on the passenger side of the forward plenum denoting "Split Port Induction".

For 1999 the 3.8 L in the Mustang was updated to use the split port cylinder heads originally introduced on the Windstar, but did not use IMRC, leaving all twelve intake runners open at all times. Output of the V6 in these Mustangs was 190 hp (142 kW) at 5250 rpm and 220 lb⋅ft (298 N⋅m) of torque at 2750 rpm. With the addition of IMRC to the Mustang in 2001, engine output increased slightly to 193 hp (144 kW) at 5500 rpm and 225 lb⋅ft (305 N⋅m) of torque at 2800 rpm.

A nine-digit serial number appears on a label on the right side (front) valve cover. It also appears on a barcode label on the transmission side of the right side head.

Applications:

- 1982 Ford Granada
- 1982–1983 Ford F-100
- 1982–1997 Ford Thunderbird and Mercury Cougar
- 1982–1986, 1994–2004 Ford Mustang
- 1982–1986 Mercury Capri
- 1983–1986 Ford LTD and Mercury Marquis
- 1988–1995 Ford Taurus and Mercury Sable
- 1988–1994 Lincoln Continental
- 1995–2003 Ford Windstar

=== Supercharged 3.8 L ===
Ford developed a supercharged version of the 3.8 L Essex V6 that was used in two Ford MN12 platform cars beginning in the late 1980s.

A belt driven Eaton M90 roots-type supercharger spinning at 2.6 times engine rpm, to a maximum of 15,000 rpm at the engine's 6000 rpm redline, provided up to 12 psi (0.83 bar) of boost. An intercooler was added to cool the intake charge. Internal changes to the engine included an engine block and cylinder heads modified to accommodate increased coolant flow, a fully counterweighted forged crankshaft, a billet camshaft with revised cam profiles, and hypereutectic alloy pistons, along with a reduction in the compression ratio to 8.2:1. Output of this engine was 210 hp (157 kW) at 4000 rpm and 315 lb⋅ft (427 N⋅m) of torque at 2600 rpm.

Five Thunderbirds with pre-release supercharged Essex V6s were supplied to the Arizona Highway Patrol in 1988 for road testing, even though the supercharged engine never became part of an official police package. In 1991 Ford again sent a batch of supercharged engines, this time in production Thunderbird SCs, to the Arizona Highway Patrol for hot weather testing.

The supercharged Essex 3.8 L debuted in the new-for-1989 Thunderbird Super Coupe and Cougar XR-7, becoming the first supercharged engine offered by an American manufacturer since the Studebaker Silver Hawk of the late 1950s or early 1960s. The standard transmission in the Thunderbird Super Coupe was a Mazda M5R2-RKE 5-speed manual transmission, while a 4-speed AOD automatic transmission was optional.

The supercharged Essex was dropped from the Cougar XR-7 in favor of a V8 shortly after the start of the 1991 model year, but continued to be used in the Super Coupe.

For the 1994 and 1995 model years the engine received revisions that increased power to 230 hp (172 kW) at 4400 rpm and torque to 330 lb⋅ft (447 N⋅m) at 2500 rpm. The supercharger got a larger, square-style inlet, a larger attaching inlet plenum, and Teflon coated rotors. The engine received larger fuel injectors, and the compression ratio was raised to 8.5:1. The Super Coupe was offered until 1995, after which production of the engine stopped.

Applications:

- 1989–1995 Thunderbird Super Coupe
- 1989–1990 Cougar XR-7

== 4.2 L ==
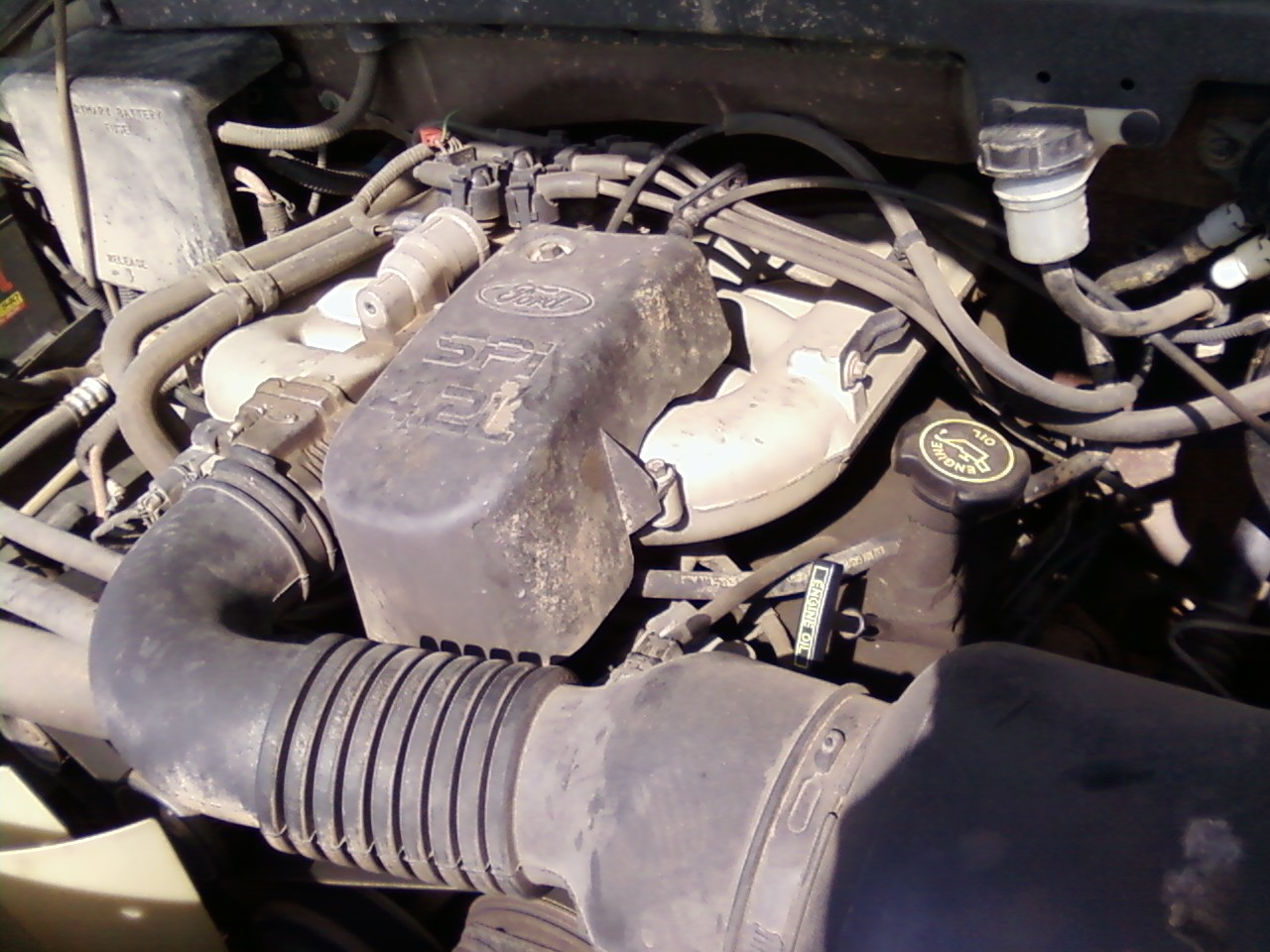
4.2 L Essex V6 in a 1998 F-150

The largest displacement version of the Essex V6 appeared in the 1997 model year as a replacement for the Ford 300 straight six in the F-150. This engine kept the 3.8 L's bore, but featured a stroke lengthened to 95 mm (3.74 in), bringing its displacement up to 4,195 cc (256.0 cu in). Power output of the 4.2 L V6 in the 1997 F-150 was 205 hp (153 kW) at 4750 rpm, and torque was 260 lb⋅ft (353 N⋅m) at 3000 rpm.

The 4.2 L Essex has been described as one of the more reliable engines offered in the F-150 at the time, although the early engines did encounter some well-known problems. All 1997–1998 engines made at the Canadian Essex plant received a bad front cover gasket. Ford initially addressed this problem by using a thicker gasket for the 1999 model year and five years later, in 2004, replaced the earlier gasket with a completely redesigned part. The lower-intake manifold also had a reputation for cracking at relatively low miles.

The 4.2 L V6's final use was as the base engine in the 2008 F-150; the 2009 and 2010 F-150 was only offered with V8 engines, and starting with the 2011 model year the new 3.7 L Cyclone became the standard engine. The 2008 model year marked the end of the Essex V6's use in cars and trucks.

An industrial version of the 4.2 L Essex engine, called the ESG-642, was offered by Ford Power Products. Versions of this engine could use gasoline, natural gas, or liquified petroleum gas as fuels. The ESG-642 was available until 2015, after which it was succeeded by the newer 3.7 L Cyclone-based CSG-637.

Applications:

- 1997–2008 Ford F-150
- 1997–2003 Ford E-150
- 1997–2003 Ford E-250
- 1998–2001 Ford F-250 (Only offered in Mexico starting in 1997, and in Brazil in the LHD short-bed version)
- 2004–2007 Ford Freestar
- 2004–2007 Mercury Monterey
- 2004–2015 ESG-642 by Ford Power Products

== 3.9 L ==
A slightly revised version of the smaller Essex V6 was introduced in 2004. With the same 96.8 mm (3.81 in) bore diameter as the 3.8 L and 4.2 L engines, but a stroke of 88 mm (3.46 in), displacement was 3,886 cc (237.1 cu in). Overall engine output was unchanged from the earlier 3.8 L. It appeared as a running change on late-production 2004 Mustangs starting on October 7, 2003, then was replaced by the 4.0 L SOHC Ford Cologne V6 when the Mustang was redesigned for 2005. The 3.9 L continued in use in the Ford Freestar minivan until production of the engine ended on September 4, 2006.

Applications:

- 2004 Ford Mustang
- 2004–2007 Ford Freestar

== See also ==
- List of Ford engines
- List of Ford bellhousing patterns
