= Ford Thunderbird (tenth generation) =

Ford Thunderbird Tenth generation
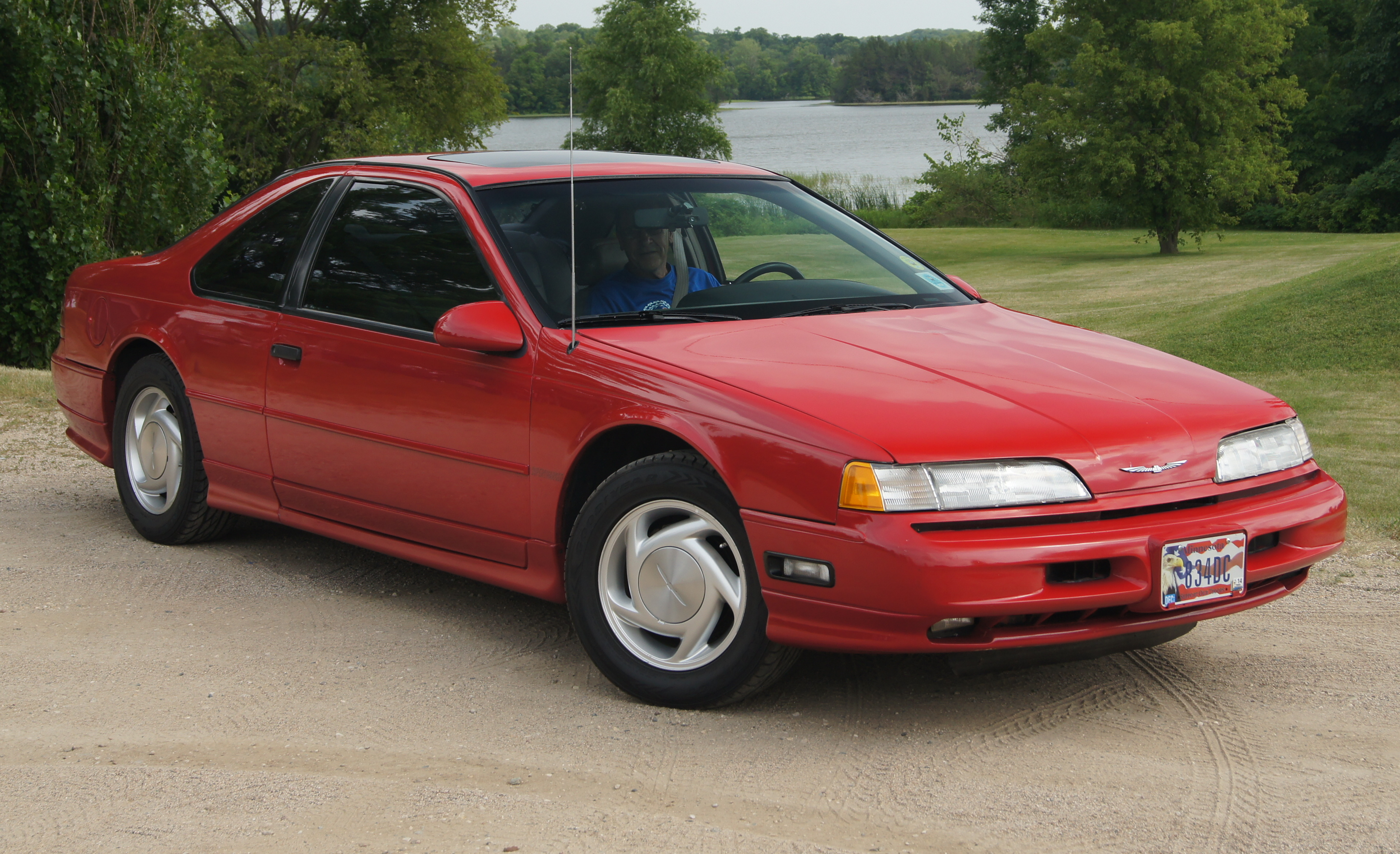
- 1989 Thunderbird Super Coupe

Overview
- Manufacturer: Ford Motor Company
- Production: October 1988–September 1997
- Model years: 1989–1997
- Assembly: United States: Lorain, Ohio (Lorain Assembly)
- Designer: Jack Telnack (1985)

Body and chassis
- Class: Personal luxury car
- Body style: 2-door coupe
- Layout: Front-engine, rear-wheel-drive
- Platform: Ford MN12
- Related: Lincoln Mark VIII; Mercury Cougar

Powertrain
- Engine: 3.8 L Essex V6 (1989–1997); 3.8 L Essex V6 (1989–1995; supercharged); 5.0L small block V8 (1991–1993); 4.6 L Ford Modular V8 (1994–1997)
- Transmission: 4-speed Ford AOD automatic (1989–1993); 4-speed Ford AOD 4R70W automatic (1994–1997); 5-speed Mazda M5R2 manual (1989–1995 Super Coupe only)

Dimensions
- Wheelbase: 113.0 in (2,870 mm)
- Length: 1989–1993: 198.7 in (5,047 mm); 1994–97: 200.3 in (5,088 mm)
- Width: 1989–1995: 72.7 in (1,847 mm); 1996–1997: 73.2 in (1,859 mm)
- Height: 1994–1997: 52.5 in (1,334 mm); 1994–1995 Super Coupe: 53.0 in (1,346 mm); 1989–1993: 52.7 in (1,339 mm); 1991–1993 Upper End Models: 53.1 in (1,349 mm)
- Curb weight: 3,536 lb (1,604 kg) (1989 V6 model); 3,725 lb (1,690 kg) (1995 V8 model)

Chronology
- Predecessor: Ford Thunderbird (ninth generation)
- Successor: Ford Thunderbird (eleventh generation)

The tenth generation of the Ford Thunderbird is a front-engine, rear-drive, five passenger, two-door personal luxury coupe manufactured and marketed by Ford for the 1989 to 1997 model years. Introduced on December 26, 1988 as a 1989 model, the Thunderbird was co-developed with the Mercury Cougar using Ford's new MN12 platform, with a more aerodynamic body, slightly shorter overall length and nine-inch-longer wheelbase than the outgoing 1988 Thunderbird.

Featuring four-wheel independent suspension, with short-and-long arms (SLA) and a spring strut assembly in the front and multiple links in the rear, offering excellent handling and ride quality, its configuration made the Thunderbird (along with the co-developed Lincoln Mark VIII and Cougar) the only rear-wheel drive North American domestic cars other than the Chevrolet Corvette to offer four-wheel independent suspension.

== Design ==
Ford dropped the V8 option for the initial release of the new Thunderbird. The base and LX models were powered by Ford's 3.8 L Essex OHV V6, rated at 140 horsepower (104 kW) at 3,800 rpm and 215 lb⋅ft (292 N⋅m) of torque at 2,400 rpm. This engine was mated to Ford's AOD 4-speed automatic transmission regardless of trim level from the 1989 to 1993 model years.

With the exception of the 1955 model, the Thunderbird traditionally used no "FORD" exterior badging of any kind. For this generation only, the Ford Blue Oval emblem was used on the trunklid.

Due in part to its low coefficient of drag, the Thunderbird was relatively fuel efficient considering its overall size and weight. The EPA gave 1989 Thunderbirds equipped with the standard V6 a fuel efficiency rating of 19 mpg_{‑US} (12 L/100 km; 23 mpg_{‑imp}) in city driving and 27 mpg_{‑US} (8.7 L/100 km; 32 mpg_{‑imp}) on the highway, though, like most cars built before 2008, this rating was retroactively reduced by the EPA to reflect newer, more realistic fuel efficiency measurements. The fuel efficiency rating was noticeably better than that of Thunderbirds equipped with higher performance engines and gave the base V6-equipped Thunderbird a significant driving range with its 19-gallon fuel tank (later decreased to 18 gallons).

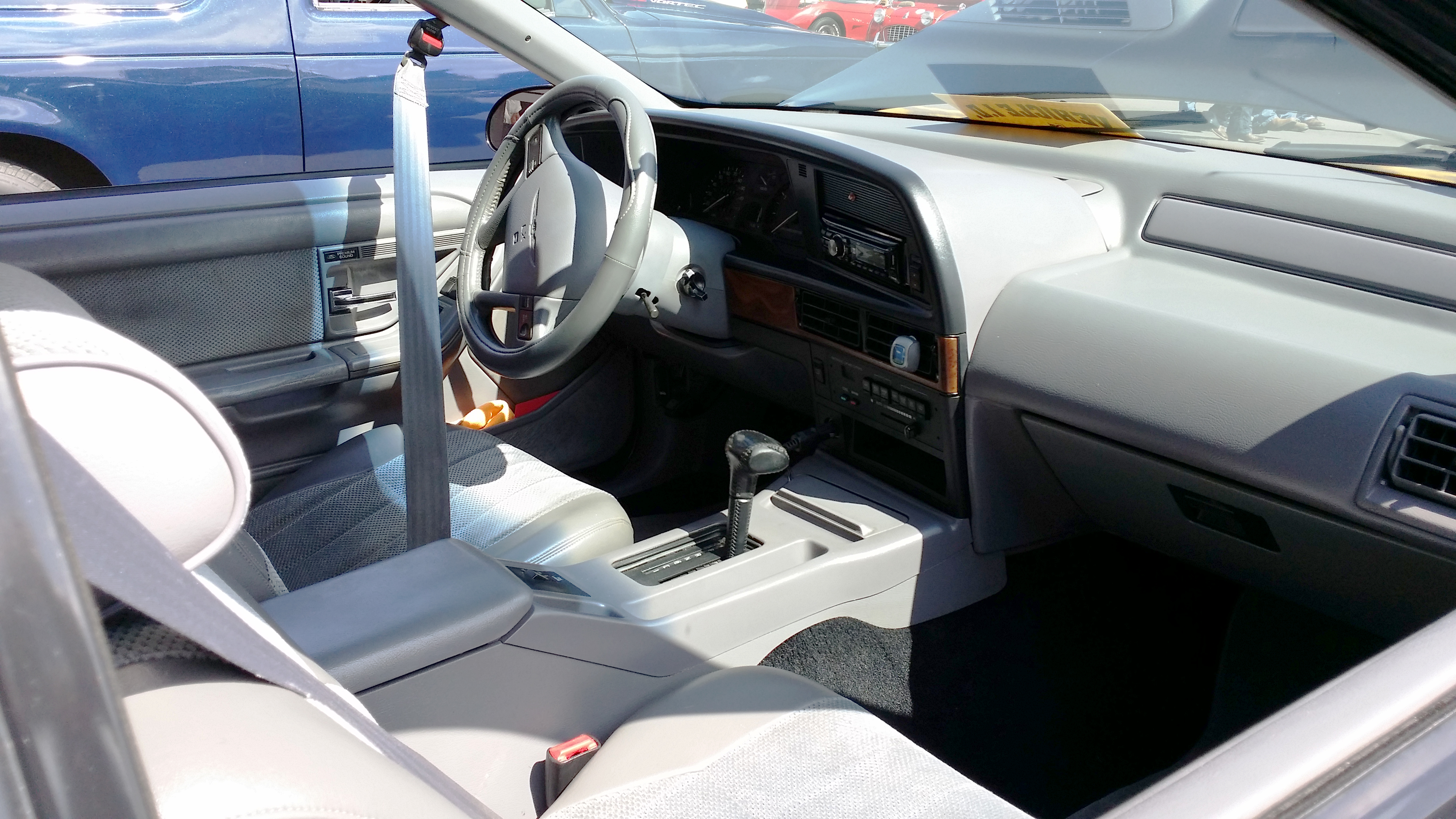
1990 Ford Thunderbird interior

A more sophisticated, supercharged and intercooled version of the 3.8 L OHV V6 was used to power the high performance Thunderbird Super Coupe, also called Thunderbird SC for short. The Super Coupe could be had with a Mazda-derived, M5R2 5-speed manual transmission or an AOD 4-speed automatic transmission (or 4R70W for 1994/1995 models). The Thunderbird Super Coupe was Motor Trend's Car of the Year for 1989, which Ford proudly advertised. When running at a maximum of 5,600 rpm, the supercharger provided 12 psi of boost, with the engine rated at 210 hp (157 kW) at 4,000 rpm and 315 lb⋅ft (427 N⋅m) of torque at 2,600 rpm under an 8.2:1 compression ratio. Accompanying the more powerful engine, Super Coupes were equipped with a host of unique features relative to standard Thunderbirds. Among these were larger, 16 x 7.0 inch alloy wheels with high performance tires (standard Thunderbirds came with 15 x 6.0 inch steel wheels and 15 x 6.5 inch alloy wheels were optional), a Traction-Lok limited-slip differential, standard anti-lock brakes, 4-wheel disc brakes (vented front and rear rotors), speed-sensitive variable assist steering, lower body side cladding, fog lights, and a stiffer suspension with adjustable shocks supplied by Tokico.

The new Thunderbird was considered a failure by Ford's top management. On January 17, 1989, then Ford President Harold A. Poling, with Ford CEO Donald Petersen and Ford Executive Vice President Phil Benton looking on, harshly criticized the MN12 program's staff in a meeting for badly missing the Thunderbird and Cougars' weight and cost targets (250 lb (113 kg) heavier and US$900 more per car than planned). This criticism came as a surprise to the program staff who expected to be praised for the Thunderbird and Cougars' technical achievements and positive reception. Anthony "Tony" S. Kuchta, manager of the MN12 program, was angered by Poling, not for his points about weight and cost overruns but rather that he directed his criticism at the program staff instead of at Kuchta who was responsible for all of the important decisions that determined the program's direction. Many of the decisions that Kuchta made regarding the MN12's development that resulted in the weight and cost overruns criticized by Poling were caused by the very things that set the MN12 cars apart from other cars in their class (such as rear-wheel drive and an independent rear suspension). Falling out of favor with Ford management after the Thunderbird and Cougars' launch, Kuchta voluntarily retired early from Ford in May 1989.

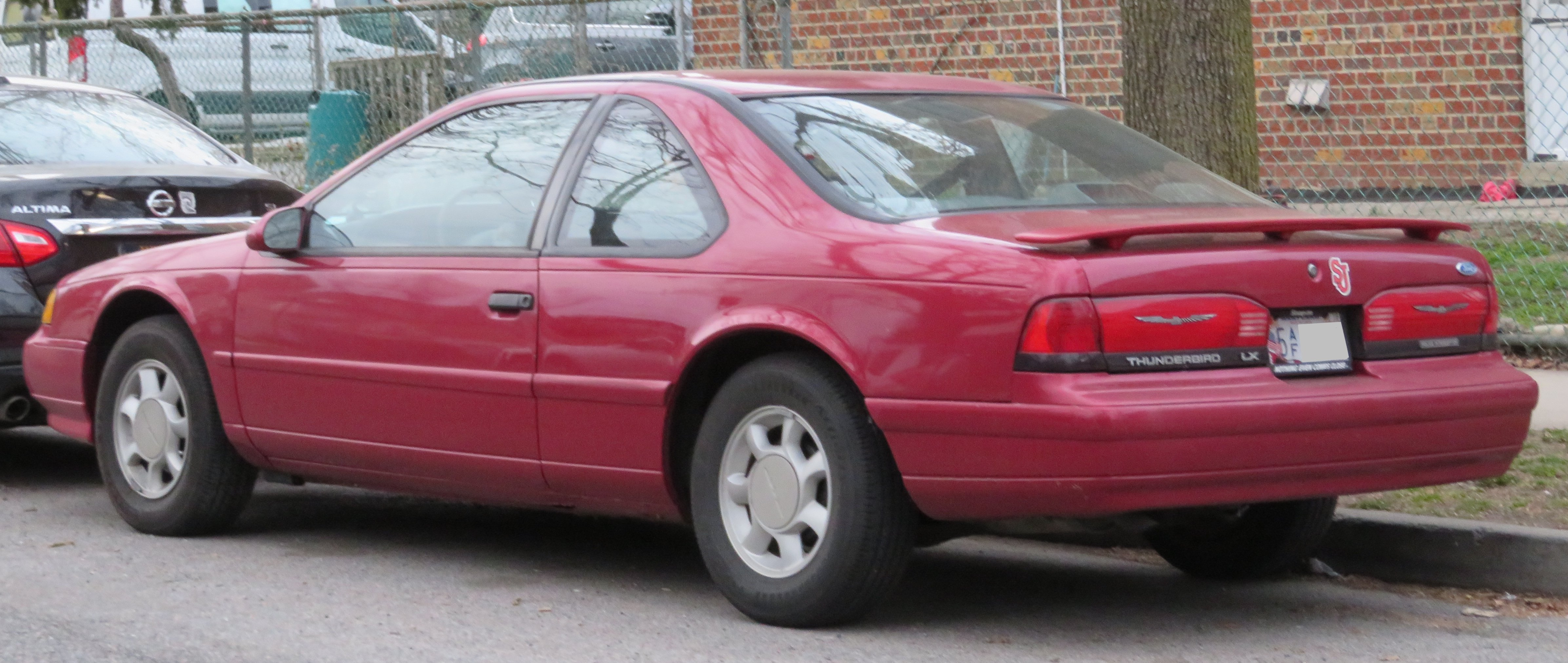
Rear view (Thunderbird LX)

== Mid-cycle changes and refreshes ==
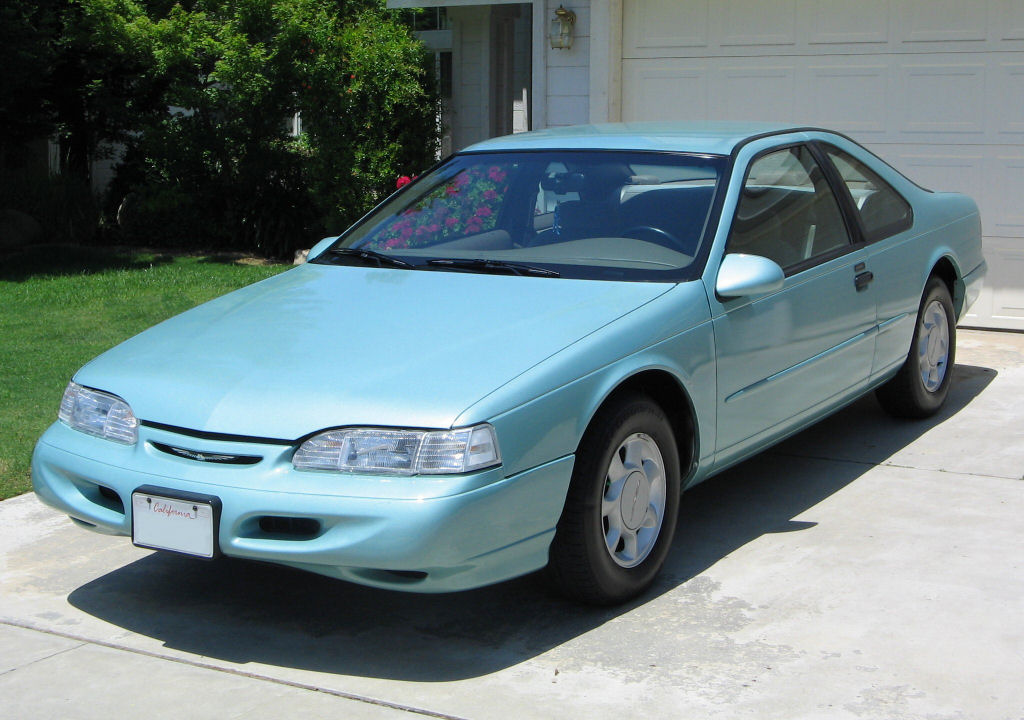
1994 Ford Thunderbird LX (with aftermarket clear marker lamps)

For the 1991 model year, Ford reintroduced a V8 option with the 5.0L V8, which included a sports suspension package. The engine was used through the 1993 model year and was rated at 200 hp (149 kW) at 4,000 rpm and 275 lb⋅ft (373 N⋅m) of torque at 3,000 rpm; gains of 45 hp (34 kW) and 10 lb⋅ft (14 N⋅m) of torque respectively over the 1988 Thunderbird. Like the standard 3.8 L V6, the V8 was only mated to the AOD 4-speed automatic transmission. On the television program MotorWeek in a review of the 1991 Thunderbird and similar Mercury Cougar, a road test of a V8-equipped Thunderbird revealed that the car could accelerate from 0 to 60 mph (97 km/h) in 9.2 seconds; approximately two seconds faster than a standard V6 Thunderbird, but about two seconds slower than a Super Coupe.

For 1992, the Thunderbird received its first styling update with a reshaped decklid featuring new LED illuminated tail lamp units. This was the first time that LEDs were used in the taillights of a production car. A V8 Sport model was offered for this year only, featuring the Super Coupe front fascia with fog lamps, lower body accent stripes and an upgraded suspension and handling package. For 1993, all Thunderbirds used the Super Coupe front fascia.

=== 1994 refresh ===
The Thunderbird received an extensive mid-cycle refresh for 1994, with revisions to powertrain, exterior appearance, addition of safety features, and a total redesign of its interior.

The front fascia saw substantial styling changes with larger air intakes in the bumper cover, new headlamps, and a new, slightly more curvaceous hood. The Thunderbird emblem was moved from the front edge of the hood to the upper air intake slot in the bumper cover. The interior was completely redesigned to accommodate dual front airbags and to optimize driver comfort and convenience, which resulted in the deletion of motorized seat belts and they were replaced with the regular seat belts. It featured wrap-around cockpit style instrumentation with a new steering wheel, radio and climate controls, and sweeping curves on the door panels and dashboard surfaces. LX models featured revised seat designs with a choice of new fabric or leather seating surfaces.

Arguably the most notable change for 1994, however, was the new 4.6 L Modular SOHC V8 which replaced the "5.0" small block engine. The 4.6 L V8 was rated at 205 hp (153 kW) at 4,500 rpm and 265 lb⋅ft (359 N⋅m) of torque at 3,200 rpm and brought with it an updated powertrain control module, the EEC-V (base V6 Thunderbirds and Super Coupes continued to use the older EEC-IV). An electronically controlled 4R70W 4-speed automatic transmission replaced the AOD automatic transmission in all instances where it was previously used in the Thunderbird. Car and Driver reviewed the 4.6 L V8 and it managed a 0 to 60 mph (97 km/h) acceleration time of 8.1 seconds and a quarter-mile being completed in 16.3 seconds at 87 mph (140 km/h).

The Super Coupe continued on for 1994 with the same supercharged 3.8 L V6 as before, but now with 230 hp (172 kW) at 4,400 rpm and 330 lb⋅ft (447 N⋅m) of torque at 2,500 rpm. This was made possible due to a number of changes. The Eaton M90 roots-type supercharger was given a larger, square style inlet, a larger attaching inlet plenum, and Teflon-coated rotors. The engine received larger fuel injectors and an increase in compression to 8.5:1.

In their March 1996 issue, Motor Trend magazine conducted a comparison test of a 1995 Thunderbird Super Coupe against the front-wheel drive Chevrolet Monte Carlo Z34 and a Buick Regal Gran Sport. The Super Coupe delivered the best overall performance, including a 0 to 60 mph (97 km/h) acceleration time of 7.0 seconds and a completion of a quarter-mile in 15.2 seconds at 88.1 mph (141.8 km/h). In summarizing the overall performance of each car relative to each other, the author of the article, Don Sherman, wrote, "The Buick Regal is a competent, comfortable car at an attractive price, but it's too androgynous to be called a Gran Sport. Nothing about it is grand, and there isn't a sporting bone in its body. All the Monte Carlo needs to succeed is a V-8 engine and a year of refinement to eradicate its quality bugs. That leaves the Thunderbird SC as this test's big winner. It's a far more sophisticated solution to the four-place-coupe equation, but is priced accordingly." In spite of positive critiques like this, the increases in output and performance over earlier Super Coupes would be short-lived, as the Thunderbird Super Coupe was discontinued after the 1995 model year due to slowing sales.

=== 1996 refresh ===
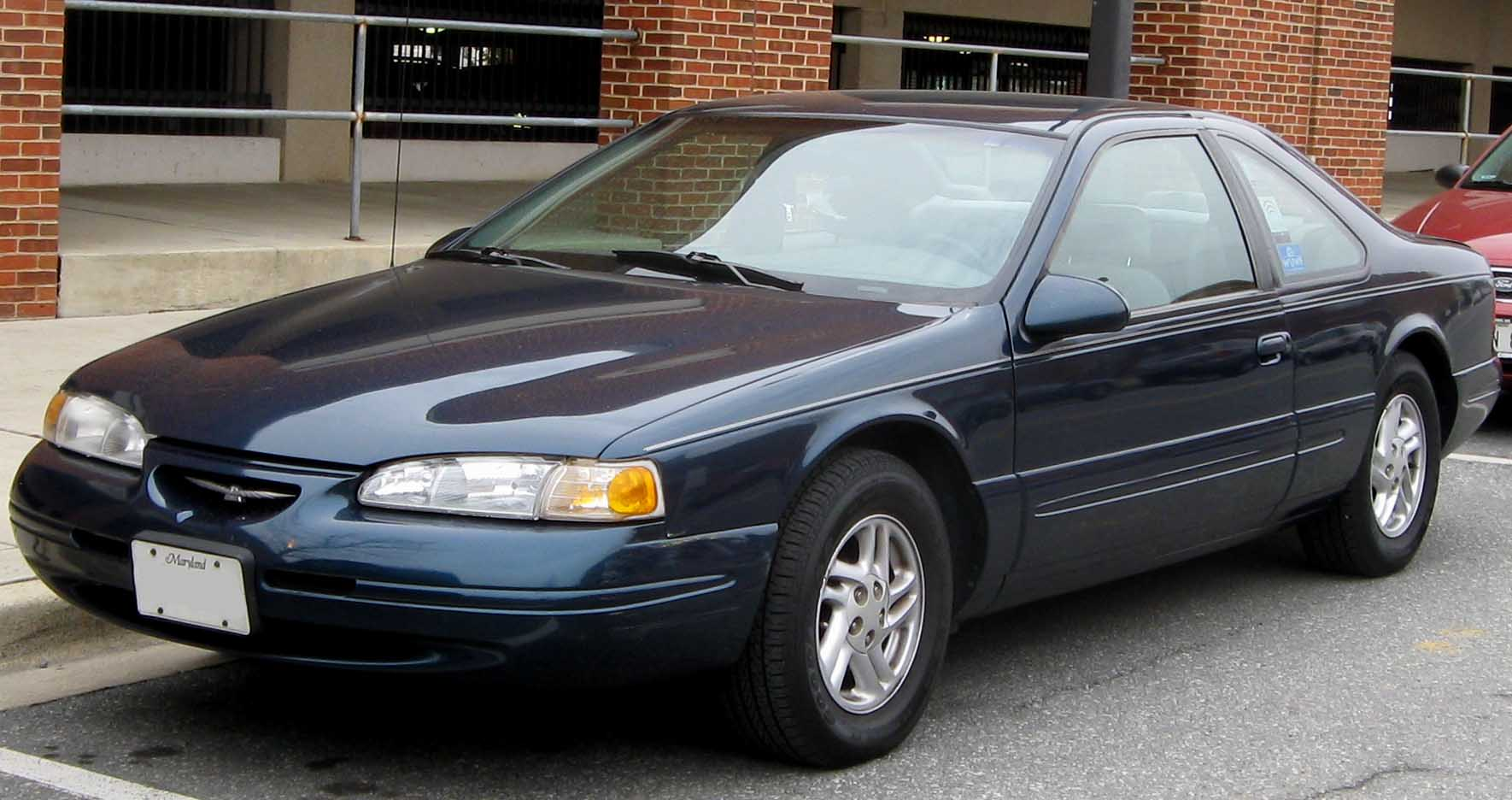
1996–1997 Ford Thunderbird LX

For 1996, the Thunderbird was offered only as an LX model. The hood, headlamps and bumper fascias were once again restyled. The front fascia received a honeycomb mesh grille, with a revised Thunderbird emblem placed in the center. The headlamps were changed to clear lenses with fluted inner reflector housings. New body-colored door handles replaced the former textured black ones and wide body-colored cladding was added along the lower bodysides. The lower tail lamp trim changed from black to red reflectors (as with former SC models) creating a uniform tail lamp appearance, with the "Thunderbird LX" badge relocated to the upper-left of the decklid in a new script font. The OBD-II specification was made mandatory for all passenger cars in 1996, and so all Thunderbirds with this refresh are equipped with it.

The 3.8 L Essex V6 received reliability upgrades based on elements of the discontinued Super Coupe's engine, giving it improved cooling and lubrication, reduced noise, and a slight increase in power. It was rated at 145 horsepower (108 kW) at 4,000 rpm and 215 lb⋅ft (292 N⋅m) of torque at 2,750 rpm. The 4.6 L V8's manifold was upgraded, providing more torque: 280 lb⋅ft (380 N⋅m) at 3,000 rpm.

A new Sport option package (different from the 1992 version), was made available for V8-equipped models. It included a performance suspension, 16" aluminum wheels, and a rear decklid spoiler (with integral reverse light, replacing the one normally placed inside the cab behind the rear window).

For 1997, the generation's final year, numerous interior options were eliminated. The instrument panel was changed to a simplified version matching that year's Ford Taurus, and the center console was redesigned for better ergonomics. Four-wheel disc brakes were made standard.

== Special editions and rare versions ==
=== 1990 35th Anniversary Edition ===
For the 35th anniversary of the Thunderbird in 1990, Ford introduced the 35th Anniversary Edition: A Super Coupe in black with two stripes, one in blue and one in silver, patched black and silver wheels and anniversary fender badges. The 35th Anniversary also had a unique dark gray and silver, leather and suede interior. In addition, purchasers received the 35th Anniversary Owner's package. The package came with a key chain, a car cover, a pen, upholstery cleaning kit and a book. Ford made 3,371 examples for 1990 only.

=== 1993 Davey Allison Limited Edition ===
The 1993 Davey Allison Limited Edition made to honor NASCAR driver Davey Allison, who had recently died in a plane crash in July, 1993. The Edition was officially offered by Ford though dealers. It was only offered in two colors, white and black. The package was available on every trim with most being the LX with the 5.0L V8. The package added red pin strips and embroidered floormats, and a plaque on the center console, all with Davey Allison's signature on them. A total of 1,500 cars were made.

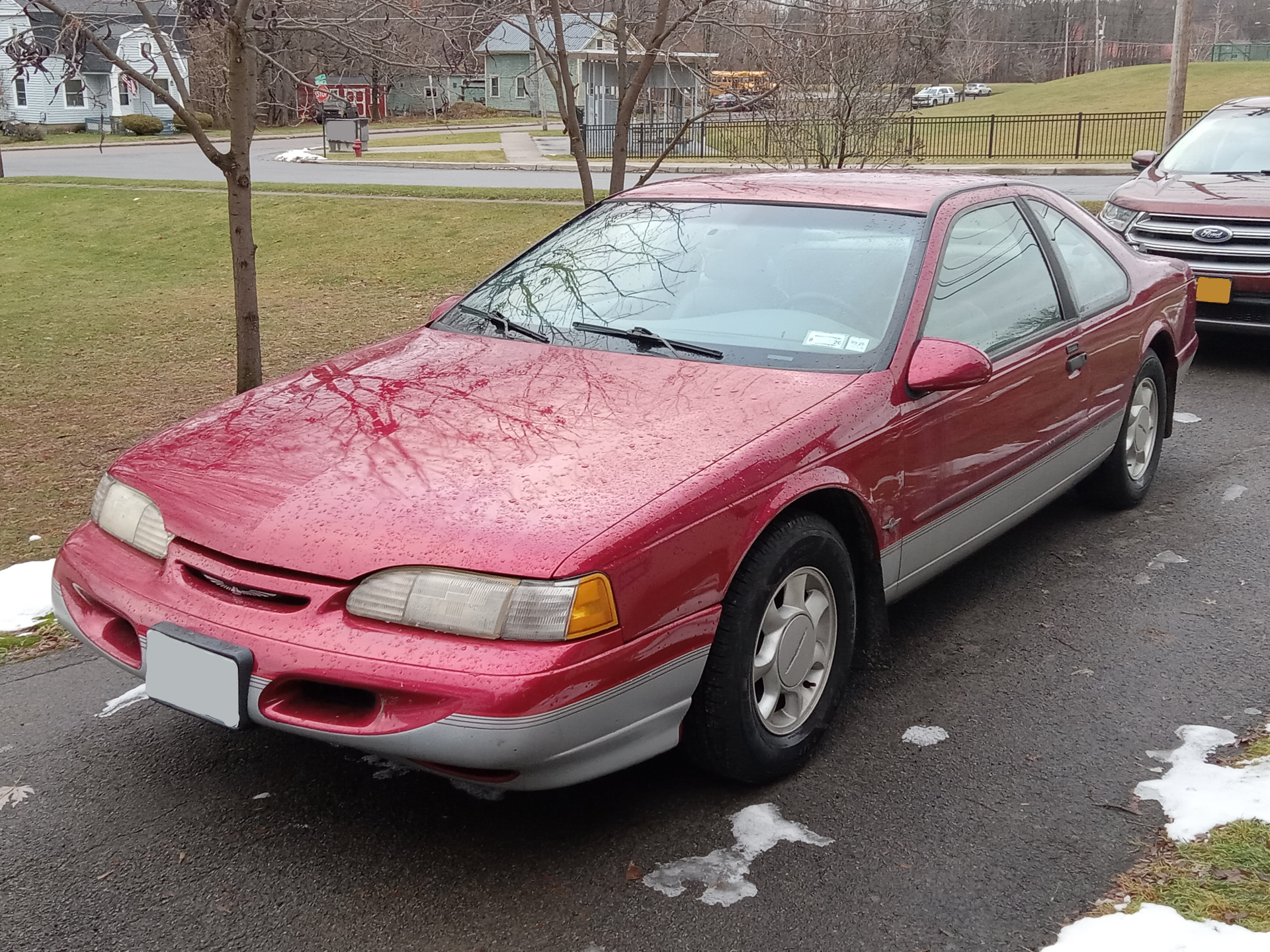
1995 Ford Thunderbird LX 40th Anniversary Edition

=== 1995 40th Anniversary ===
For the 40th anniversary of the Thunderbird, Ford introduced the 40th Anniversary package. The package was available on every trim with every available paint color, and was a $795 option. It added a lower two-tone color keyed accent stripe, embroidered floormats, front fender badges and a 40th Anniversary key chain. The package was available only in the 1995 model year. The total production numbers are unknown, but there is approximately a few 100 to few 1000 that were believed to have been made.

=== 1996 SVE ===
Toward the end of the MN12 Thunderbird's production run, Ford's Special Vehicle Engineering (SVE) division explored the idea of a new high performance Thunderbird, producing four prototypes. Stylistically the SVE Thunderbirds blended elements from the 1994–1995 and 1996–1997 Thunderbirds along with elements unique to themselves. The SVE Thunderbird used the headlights, door handles, and rear bumper cover from the 1994–1995 Thunderbird and front fascia and body side cladding from the 1996–1997 Thunderbird. Unique to the SVE Thunderbird relative to other Thunderbirds were 17-inch, five spoke Cobra R wheels, larger dual exhaust tips, a different lower section of the front fascia with fog lights, a unique spoiler, and a prominent cowl hood. The most significant difference that set the SVE Thunderbird apart from other Thunderbirds was its supercharged 4.6 L DOHC V8 engine, similar to that later found in the SVT Mustang Cobra. Power was delivered to the wheels via a Tremec T-45 5-speed manual transmission. Stopping the SVE Thunderbird were larger brakes taken from the Mustang Cobra (going along with its Cobra R wheels).

Ford not only pulled the plug on this project, but on the entire Thunderbird and Cougar line, with the 1997 model year being its last. Three out of four prototypes were destroyed while the sole surviving prototype remains in private ownership.

=== 1997 Mark Martin Edition ===
The Mark Martin Edition was a one of six special edition made by Roush Racing to celebrate the success of the number six NASCAR Cup driver Mark Martin in the Valvoline sponsored Thunderbird. Ford had no official involvement in the development of this car. Every car was painted Moonlight Blue, had the gray leather interior, rear spoiler and the 4.6 L Modular V8. Roush added 17-inch Boyd Coddington wheels, lowering springs, Bilstein shocks, red pinstripes, various Valvoline logos inside and outside of the car, and a number plaque on the ashtray cover.

=== 1997 Limited Edition ===
The 1997 Limited Edition was made to commemorate the last year of production for the MN12 Thunderbird. It was very similar to the 1995 40th Anniversary edition. The Limited Edition added gray accents on the side trim, embroidered floormats and two front fender badges that were nearly identical to the 40th anniversary fender badges but the badges said Limited Edition on them instead. Total production numbers are unknown but its believed that a few thousand were made.

=== 1997 Rusty Wallace Signature Edition ===
There is almost nothing known about this Edition online. It was most likely a regional dealer appearance package. The only other thing that is known is that the cars were painted black.

== The last MN12 Thunderbird ==
On September 4, 1997, the final MN12 Thunderbird was built at Ford's assembly plant in Lorain, Ohio. As it rolled down the assembly line, a sign saying "That's All Folks" adorned the decklid. The whereabouts of the last MN12 Thunderbird are currently unknown.

== Production totals ==
Year	Production
1989	122,909
1990	114,040
1991	84,719
1992	74,149
1993	130,750
1994	121,082
1995	115,397
1996	112,302
1997	85,276
Total	960,624
