= Lincoln Mark VIII =

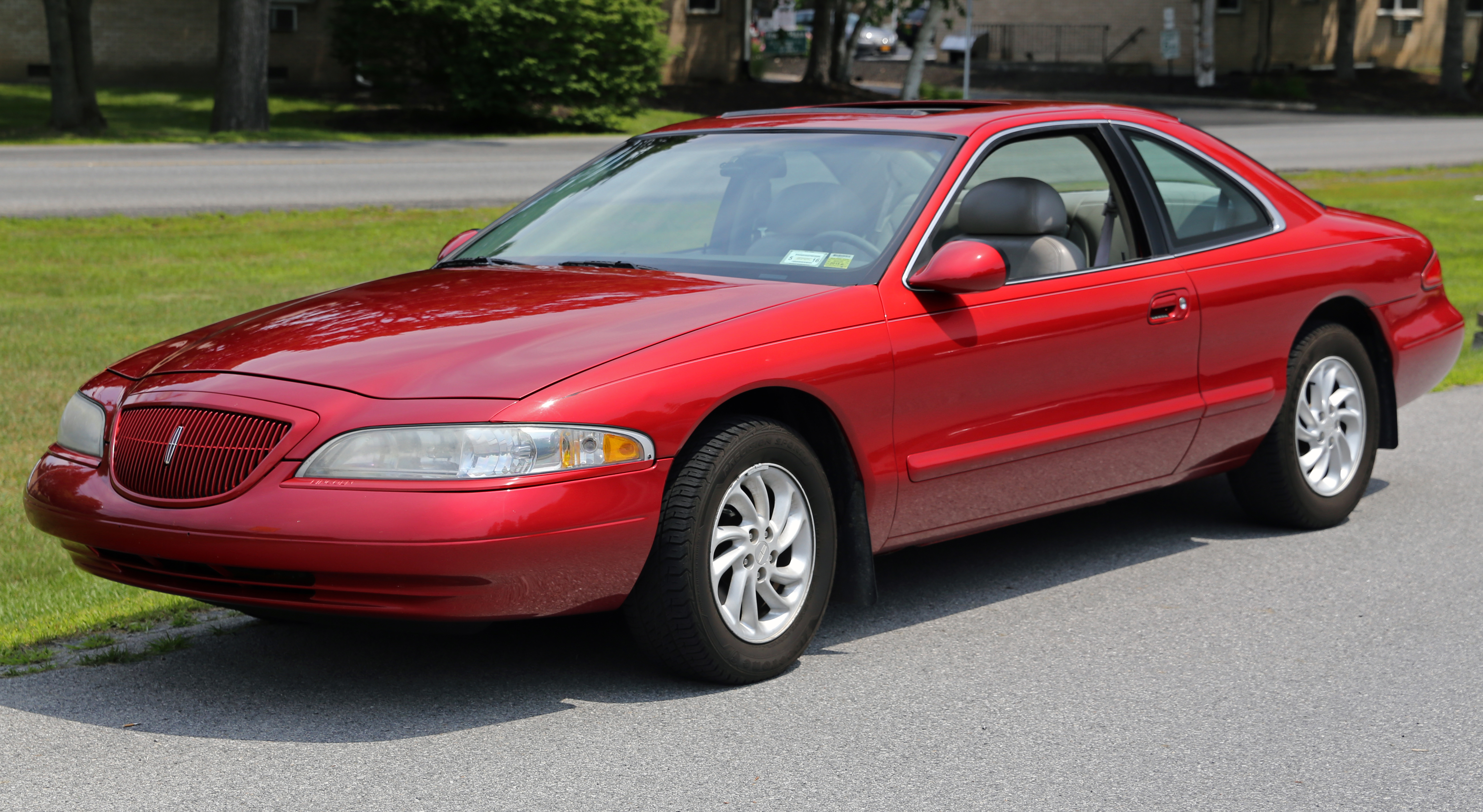
- 1998 Lincoln Mark VIII (facelift)

Overview
- Manufacturer: Lincoln (Ford)
- Production: October 1992 – June 1998
- Model years: 1993–1998
- Assembly: United States: Wixom, Michigan (Wixom Assembly Plant)
- Designer: Kyu Kim (1989)

Body and chassis
- Class: Personal luxury car
- Body style: 2-door coupe
- Layout: FR layout
- Platform: Ford FN10 platform
- Related: Ford Thunderbird (tenth generation)

Powertrain
- Engine: 4.6 L Intech V8
- Transmission: 4-speed automatic

Dimensions
- Wheelbase: 113.0 in (2,870 mm)
- Length: 1993–1994: 206.9 in (5,255 mm); 1995–1996: 207.3 in (5,265 mm); 1997–1998: 207.2 in (5,263 mm)
- Width: 1993–1994: 74.6 in (1,895 mm); 1995–1996: 74.8 in (1,900 mm)
- Height: 53.6 in (1,361 mm)
- Curb weight: 3,757 lb (1,704 kg); 4,921 lb (2,232 kg) (GVW)

Chronology
- Predecessor: Lincoln Mark VII
- Successor: Lincoln LS V8

The Lincoln Mark VIII is a grand touring luxury sport coupe that was marketed by Lincoln from the 1993 to 1998 model years. The first generation of the Mark series branded entirely as a Lincoln, the Mark VIII again served as a counterpart of the Ford Thunderbird and Mercury Cougar. Though maintaining its traditional brand rivalry with the Cadillac Eldorado, the Mark VIII was also developed to become more competitive against luxury coupes from automakers around the world.

Replacing the Fox platform used by the Mark VII, the Mark VIII was the exclusive model of the Ford FN10 chassis, an evolution of the MN12 platform developed for the 1989 Thunderbird and Cougar. Growing slightly in size (primarily in wheelbase length), the Mark VIII adopted four-wheel independent suspension; at the time of its production, the only other rear-wheel drive American cars (alongside the Thunderbird and Cougar) were the two-seat Chevrolet Corvette and Dodge Viper RT/10. The model line also introduced a dual-overhead cam 4.6L V8, becoming the first Ford Motor Company vehicle fitted with such an engine.

The Mark VIII was manufactured by Ford at its Wixom Assembly Plant (Wixom, Michigan), with 122,060 produced. As of current production, the Mark VIII remains the final generation of the Mark series and Lincoln has not introduced a direct successor to the model line.

== Development ==
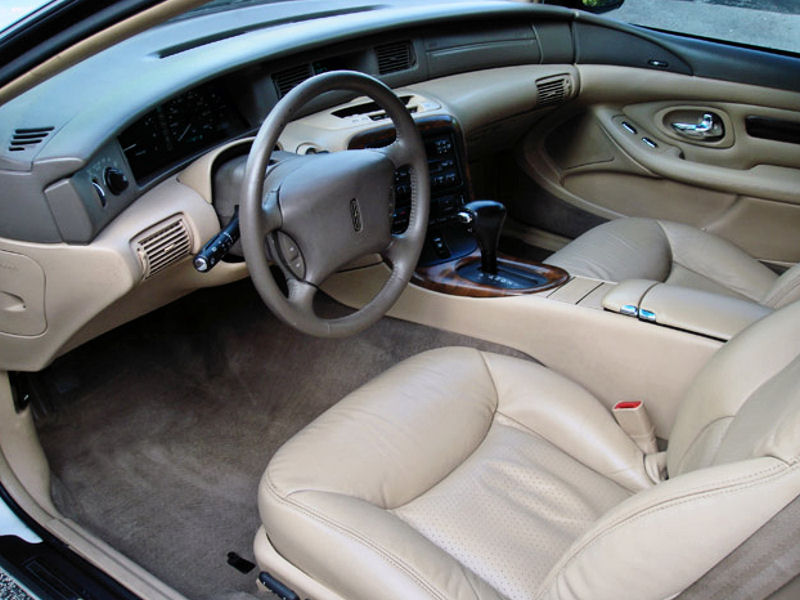
Interior of a 1998 Mark VIII, other model years are similar

Development of the Mark VIII (FN-10) began in 1984 with a projected release for the 1990 model year. Design work began in 1986 and was oriented toward evolutionary changes. By 1987, Lincoln designers emphasized interior design, as ordered by then Ford design director Dave Rees. In the autumn of 1988, FN-10 development was pushed and went through several revisions. This was done to further develop a more precise product to accommodate the use of a DOHC modular engine, using the upcoming MN12 platform due to be launched in December 1988.

=== Stretch designs ===
Having seen designs of upcoming models from competitors, Ford ordered a radical redesign, a departure from any previous Lincolns, while retaining styling cues. By November 1988, under Ford designer Kyu Kim, Ford presented a design named "Stretch I", featuring scalloped sides, full length taillights, the spare-tire hump, waterfall grille, small C-pillars, a full-length headlight setup, two air inlets on the front bumper, taillights that flowed upward on the sides rather than downward on the production car — and devoid of chrome. A clay mockup of Stretch I was finalized within four weeks.

"Stretch I" was shown in 1:1 scale in clay to Lincoln executives on December 12, 1988. Appalled by the design, the executives ordered several changes to the exterior. As a result, "Stretch II" was created during early 1989, by adding chrome in several places and moderately revising the front and rear end treatments. Stretch II represented about 70 percent of the finished product, with details revised up to mid-1989.

The final design freeze of the FN-10 Mark VIII occurred, scheduled for an April 1992 start of production and June 1992 launch as a 1993 model year vehicle. FN-10 prototype mules in modified Ford Thunderbird and Mercury Cougar bodies began road-testing in 1990. Full-body prototypes later commenced road-testing in the first half of 1991. In February 1991, launch was delayed by 6 months to December 1992.

The 1993 Mark VIII was unveiled by the press in March 1992 and officially introduced to the public on November 18, 1992, at a Hotel Mark in New York City. Production of the 1992 Mark VII ended at the Wixom Plant in April 1992 to facilitate retooling for October production commencement of the Mark VIII.

== Model history ==
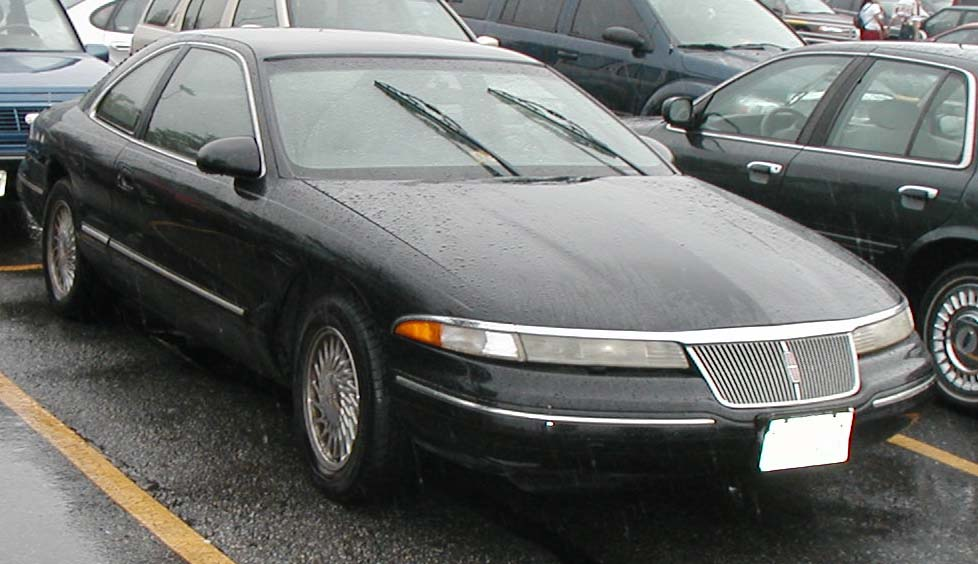
1993–1996 Lincoln Mark VIII

The 1993 Mark VIII was a larger car than its predecessor, being about five inches longer and nearly four inches wider than the Mark VII. The car also had a wheelbase of 113.0 in (2,870.2 mm), over 4 in (101.6 mm) longer than the Mark VII's, which afforded greater interior space and ride quality. In spite of its larger overall size, the Mark VIII's base curb weight was slightly lighter than the Mark VII at a little over 3,750 lb (1,701 kg).

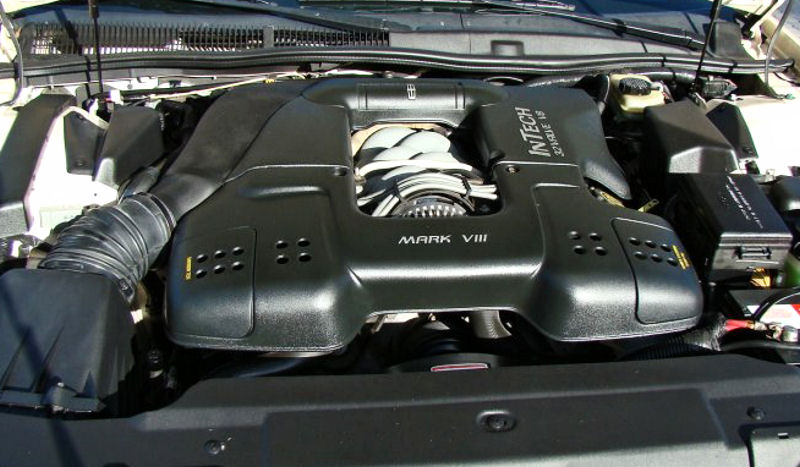
Engine bay of a 1996 Mark VIII with the 4.6 L "InTech" V8

The Mark VIII featured unibody construction with a high-strength roof, heavy-gauge steel door beams to protect against side impacts, front and rear crumple zones, dual front-side airbags, and four-wheel antilock disc brakes. It also featured a short-long arm (SLA) four-wheel independent suspension with front and rear stabilizer bars and a standard computer-controlled air suspension with sensors to automatically lower the ride height at high speed, enhancing the car's aerodynamics. Powering the Mark VIII was an all-new, all-aluminum 4.6 L (281 cu in) DOHC 32-valve V8. The engine was the first of its kind in Ford's Modular engine family and produced 280 hp (209 kW; 284 PS) at 5500 rpm and 285 lb⋅ft (386 N⋅m) of torque at 4500 rpm, and required premium grade 91-octane fuel for optimum performance. Handling the V8's power was the 4R70W 4-speed automatic transmission with overdrive. The Mark VIII's rear axle ratio was 3.08:1. Also featured were standard chrome dual exhaust tips and 16-inch cast aluminum wheels.

The Mark VIII uses a 140-mph speedometer, an electronic message center (giving time, compass heading, fuel efficiency, engine oil life, and various other vehicle-related warnings and information), automatic climate control, cruise control, leather seating surfaces, six-way power driver and passenger seats with power lumbar supports, a two-position memory for the power driver's seat, power door locks, heated power mirrors, power windows with a driver's-side express-down feature, illuminated keyless entry with remote, automatic headlamps, an AM/FM stereo-cassette radio, and an automatic power antenna. Options included a power moonroof, electrochromic automatic dimming mirrors (which filtered out headlight glare from behind), an AM/FM stereo-CD player, a 10-disc CD changer, and a JBL speaker system.

For 1995, the Mark VIII received a slightly updated instrument panel along with a new radio design. Arriving midyear was a new LSC (Luxury Sport Coupe) model. A retuned version of the standard 4.6 L DOHC V8, now marketed under the name InTech regardless of model, with a true dual exhaust, produced 290 hp (216 kW; 294 PS) at 5750 rpm and 295 lb⋅ft (400 N⋅m) of torque at 4500 rpm. The Mark VIII LSC used the same 4R70W automatic transmission as the standard Mark VIII, but featured a more aggressive rear axle ratio of 3.27:1. The brochure for the 1995 Lincoln Mark VIII LSC claims a 0–60 mph (0–97 km/h) acceleration time of 7.5 seconds. The LSC featured unique body colors, distinct rear decklid badging, perforated leather seat inserts, and floor mats. The bright chrome inserts normally found in the body-side moulding and bumper on the Mark VIII were replaced with monochrome body color inserts on the LSC. The 1995 Mark VIII LSC also marked the first domestic use of HID headlights.

A Diamond Anniversary package was offered on the 1996 Mark VIII to commemorate Lincoln's 75th anniversary. It featured "Diamond Anniversary" badging, leather seats, voice-activated cellular phone, JBL audio system, auto electrochromatic dimming mirror with compass, and traction control.

=== 1997 facelift ===
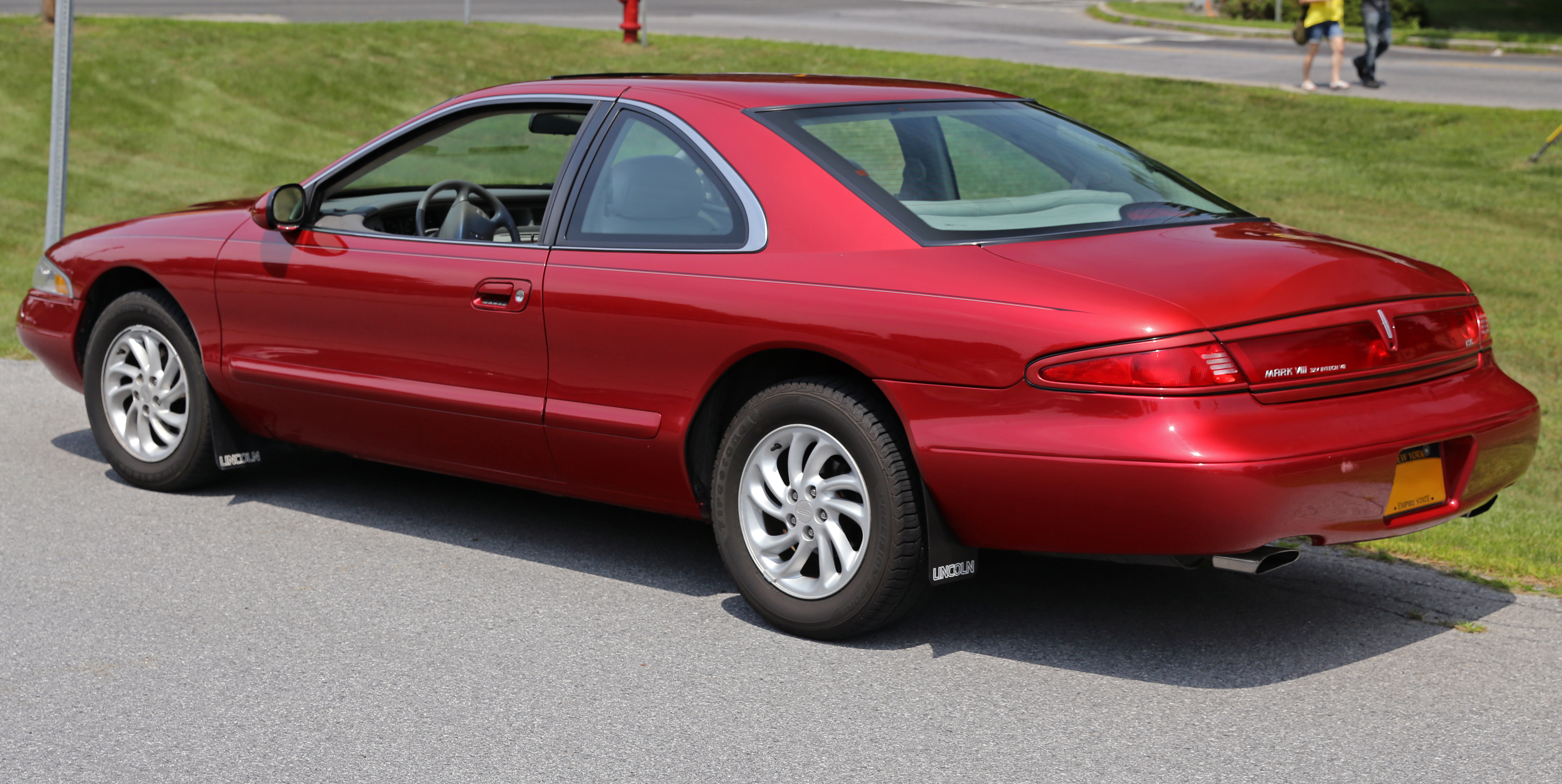
1998 Lincoln Mark VIII LSC

Development of an updated FN-10 began in 1993, with a design freeze occurring in November 1994. The first prototypes were built in September 1995, testing into mid-1996. In September 1996, Alcan Aluminum Limited won a bid to supply hoods for the revised FN-10. In the fall of 1996, the Mark VIII received a significant facelift since its 1992 debut, featuring smoother, more rounded front and rear fascias and a larger grille. The car's hood was now aluminum (previously a fiberglass composite) and the trunk carried a more subtle version of the "spare tire hump" associated with earlier Mark Series cars. HID headlamps became standard and were placed in larger housings compared to earlier models. A neon brake light ran across the rear decklid. Side mirrors now came with puddle lamps, which, upon unlocking the doors, illuminated the ground for the driver and passengers to see when entering the car. The side-view mirror housings also incorporated flashing LED turn signal lamps to warn other drivers of an intended lane change or turn. The interior included 'theater lighting', which softly illuminated the driver's controls and handles.

The 4.6 L (280 cu in) InTech V8 carried on as before, but now came with a distributorless coil-on-plug ignition system, eliminating the use of high-voltage spark plug wires. Some of the internal components of the 4R70W automatic transmission were reinforced for greater durability and reliability in late 1997 models and all 1998 models. LSC models had firmer shocks and larger stabilizer bars for even better handling and control. All-speed traction control was now standard, and could be deactivated via the onboard systems status computer when desired.

Toward the end of Mark VIII production, Lincoln offered two personalized "specialty" models: the Spring Feature and the Collector's Edition. Mark VIII production ended with the 1998 model year. The new four-door mid-sized Lincoln LS, introduced June 1999 as a 2000 model, served as a replacement for the Mark VIII.

== Motorsport ==
Under direction of Jim Kennedy, Senior Ford engineer, a team of engineers was assembled to take a stock Mark VIII to the Bonneville Salt Flats in October 1992 to compete in the World Finals, attempting to exceed the existing class speed record of 163 mph. John Engfehr and Henry Neubauer from the Ford engine lab headed up the engine performance team at the salt flats. The Mark VIII ran an official Southern California Timing Association average speed over two runs of 181.171 for the new record. This car was rediscovered by Land Speed Racers in Texas who restored the car to its original racing form in 2021 and hold three new land speed records in the stock under 5 liter class for the 1/2 mile, 1 mile and 2 km. with the East Coast Timing Association.

In 1996, Michael Kranefuss built a prototype stock car for potential competition in the NASCAR Winston Cup Series ahead of the announcement that the Ford Thunderbird would be discontinued after 1997. The project was stopped by Ford for brand image reasons. Ford instead fielded the Ford Taurus for NASCAR's top two divisions in 1998.

== Production ==
Lincoln Mark VIII Production Figures
	Yearly Total
1993	30,899
1994	26,983
1995	20,099
1996	13,357
1997	16,365
1998	14,357
Total	122,060
