= Ford MN12 platform =

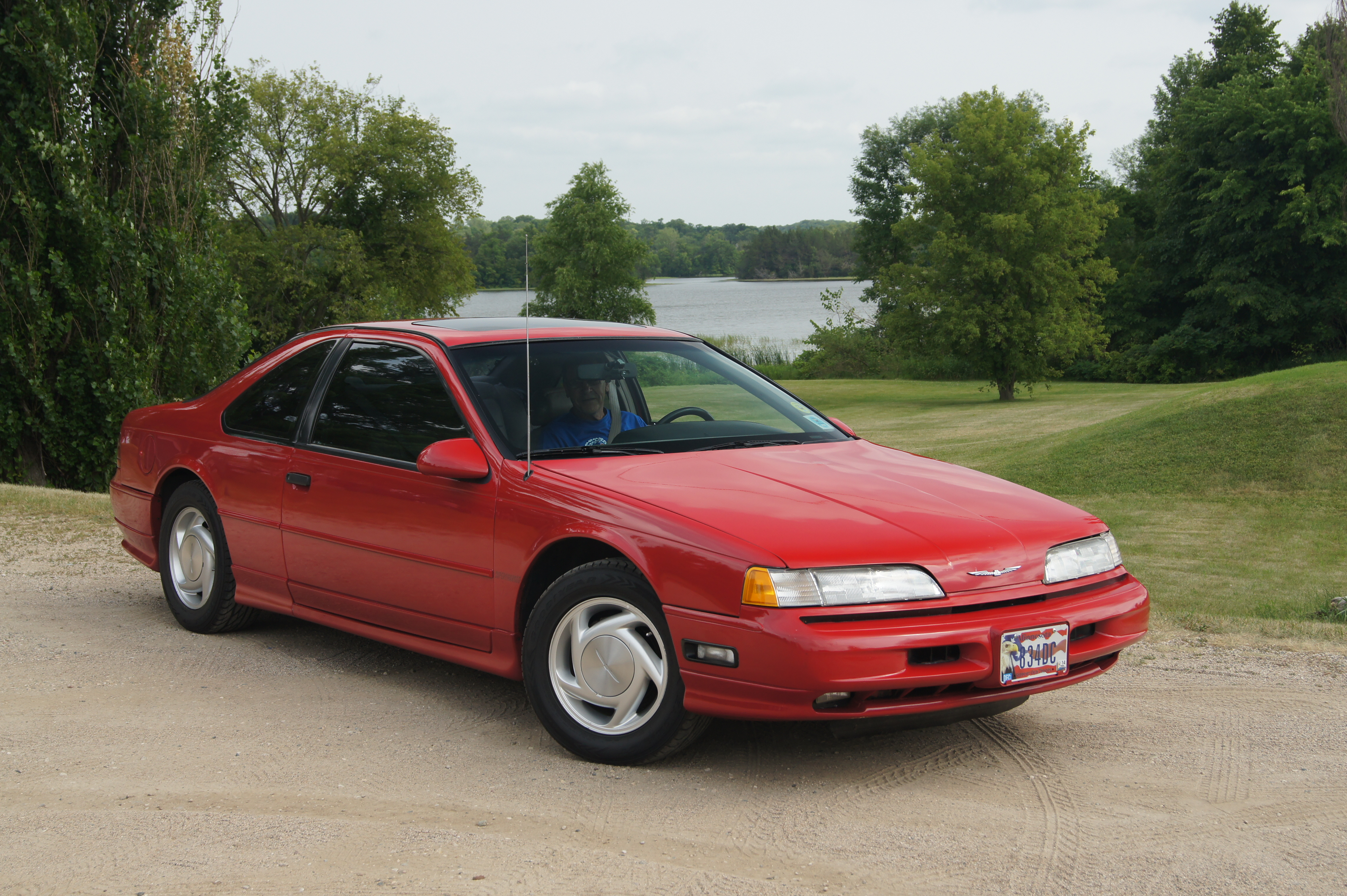
- 1989 Ford Thunderbird SC (Super Coupe)

Overview
- Manufacturer: Ford Motor Company
- Also called: FN10 platform (Lincoln Mark VIII)
- Production: 1988–1997
- Assembly: Lorain, Ohio (Lorain Assembly); Wixom, Michigan (Wixom Assembly)

Body and chassis
- Class: Personal luxury coupe Grand touring luxury coupe
- Layout: FR layout
- Body style(s): 2-door coupe
- Vehicles: Ford Thunderbird (tenth generation); Mercury Cougar (seventh generation); Lincoln Mark VIII

Powertrain
- Engine(s): 3.8 L (232 cu in) Essex V6; 4.9 L (302 cu in) Windsor V8; 4.6 L (281 cu in) Modular V8

Dimensions
- Wheelbase: 2,870 mm (113 in)

The Ford MN12 platform (Mid-size North America, Corporate Program #12) is a car platform that was used by the Ford Motor Company from 1988 to 1997 for the 1989–1997 model year Ford Thunderbird and Mercury Cougar two-door personal luxury cars. A variant of this platform, known as the FN10 (Lincoln, North American, corporate Program #10), was used for the 1993–1998 model year Lincoln Mark VIII from 1992 to 1998. Each car based on this platform had a front-engine, rear-wheel drive layout with an independent rear suspension.

== Development ==
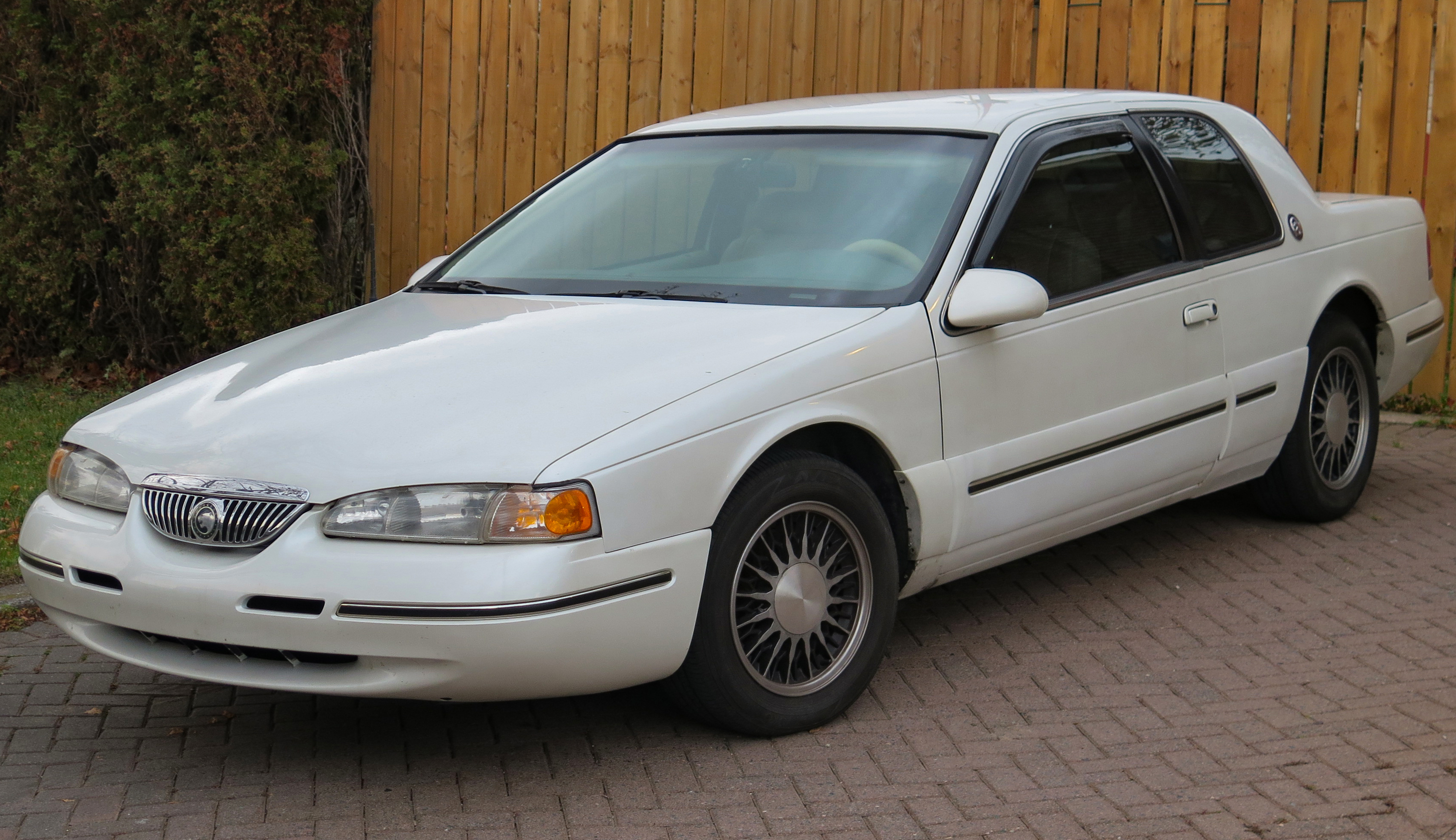
'97 Mercury Cougar XR7

The roots of the MN12 program began in 1984 when Ford sought to build on the success of the then-current, Fox body-based Thunderbird and Cougar. Going beyond unique styling, Ford wanted to produce a Thunderbird and Cougar that could compete with more sophisticated and higher performing cars from European automakers such as BMW. To accomplish this, Ford needed to develop a new platform since the existing Fox platform couldn't satisfy the requirements of the MN12 program.

Heading the program was Anthony "Tony" S. Kuchta, who was appointed to the position by Ford management in 1986, when formal production program began. Kuchta decided to retain a rear-wheel drive layout for the MN12 platform as a basis for delivering better road performance, as opposed to following the Thunderbird and Cougars' front-wheel drive-based rivals from General Motors, such as the Pontiac Grand Prix and Buick Regal. Kuchta also approved an independent rear suspension for the MN12 platform, something that would make the Thunderbird and Cougar the only rear-drive domestic cars other than the Chevrolet Corvette (and the later Dodge Viper RT/10) to feature this.

Ford engineers working on the MN12 program also explored the use of all-wheel drive for the platform with Ford going so far as paying German automaker Porsche to study the feasibility of its use, but Kuchta ultimately decided against it out of cost concerns.

== Overview ==
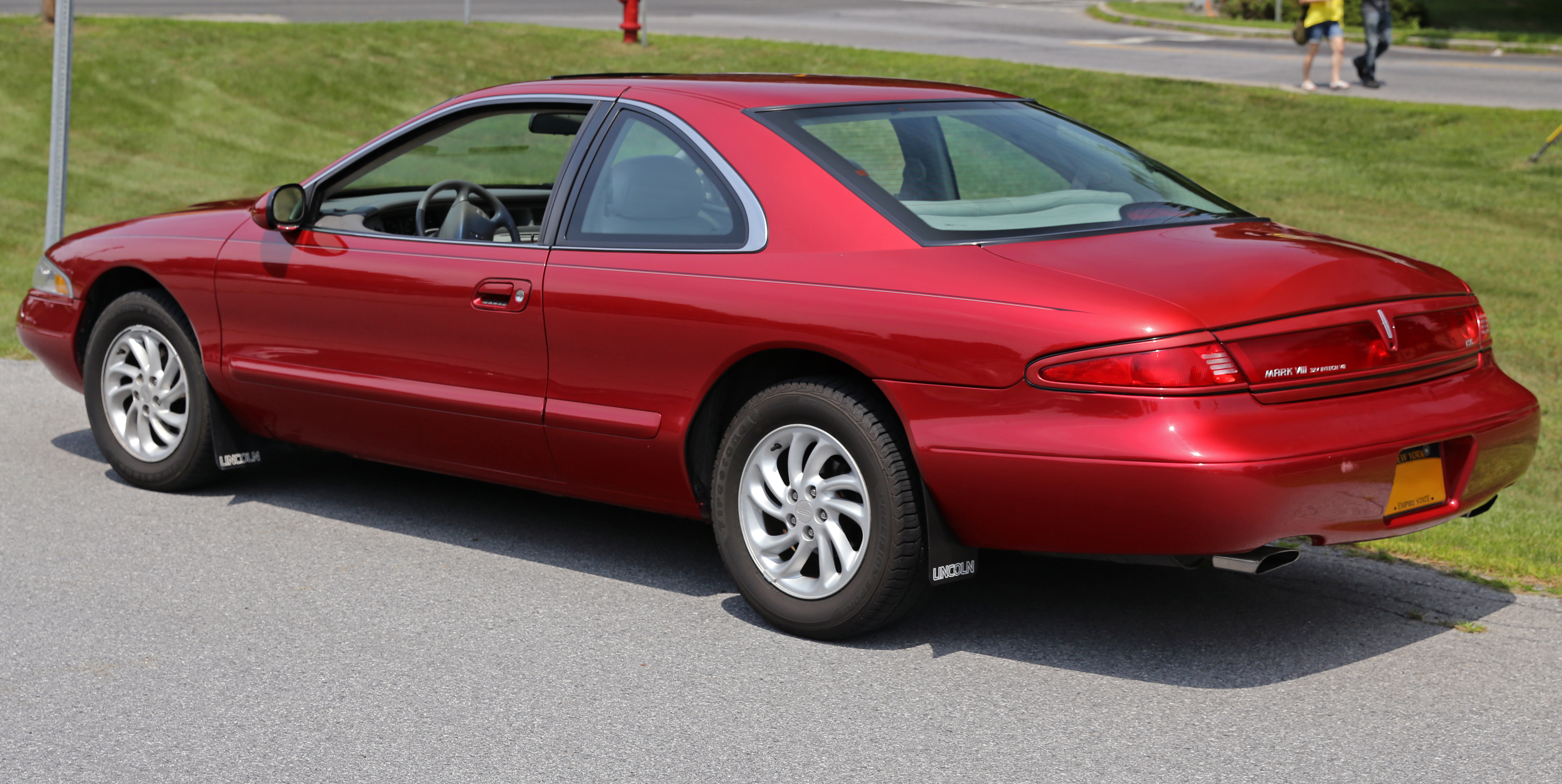
1998 Lincoln Mark VIII LSC

MN12 cars had a 113" wheelbase and were available with a 3.8L V6 engine, a 3.8L V6 supercharged engine from 1988 to 1995 (1988-1990 in Cougar), a 5.0L V8 engine from 1991 to 1993, and a 4.6L V8 engine from 1994 to 1997. A 4.6L DOHC V8 engine was used for the FN10 platform Lincoln Mark VIII from 1993 to 1998.

=== Suspension ===
The front suspension consists of upper and lower control arms with coilover shocks. A common misconception with this platform is that the front end has struts; however, since there is an upper control arm they are actually coilover shocks. Brakes were a vented rotor / single-piston caliper with Sport model Thunderbirds receiving a larger diameter rotor. The rear suspension consisted of upper and lower control arms with coil spring and shock. Varying sway bar diameters were used among the different models of Cougar and Thunderbird. All MN12 cars shipped from the factory with a 5 x 4.25" (5x108mm) lugnut bolt pattern.
