= Mazda M5OD transmission =

Line of manual transmissions produced by Mazda

The M5OD (Mazda 5-speed with Over Drive) is a line of manual transmissions produced by Mazda and used in Mazda and Ford cars and trucks. Two variants, light-duty R1 and medium duty R2, were made. R1 transmissions have been used in the Ford Ranger, Explorer, Aerostar, and Bronco II. R2 versions have been used in the F-150, Econoline Van, full size Bronco, and the Cougar/Thunderbird with the supercharged V6.

The M5OD ended production in December 2011, being last used in the 2011 Ford Ranger.

The M5OD is fully synchronized on all gears, including reverse. The synchronized reverse gear was one of the main features of the new units, to protect internal components from being damaged by inadvertent operation by the customer, and was protected by US Patent 4,757,726. The transmission has an integral bellhousing, making the power plant stiffness high enough to avoid harmful resonance. The transmission uses a hydraulic clutch setup and has an internal slave cylinder, which is a source of frustration for anyone having a slave cylinder failure, as it requires the entire transmission to be removed.

== Applications ==
=== M5OD-R1 ===
- 1988–2011 Ford Ranger
- 1988–1990 Ford Bronco II
- 1988–1995 Ford Aerostar
- 1991–2000 Ford Explorer

=== M5OD-R1HD ===
- 2001–2003 Ford Explorer Sport (4.0 L SOHC V6 engine)
- 2001–2003 Ford Explorer Sport Trac (4.0 L SOHC V6 engine)
- 2001–2011 Ford Ranger (4.0 L SOHC V6 engine)

=== M5OD-R2 ===
- 1988–1996 Ford F-150 (4.9 L I6 and 5.0 L V8 engines)
- 1987–1996 Ford Bronco (4.9 L I6 and 5.0 L V8 engines)
- 1988–1989 Ford Econoline (4.9 L I6)
- 1997–2008 Ford F-150 (4.2 L V6 and 4.6 L V8 engines)
- 2006–2011 Ford Ranger/Mazda BT-50 (2.5/3.0 L I4 common rail turbocharged diesel engines)
- 2007–2010 Ford Everest (2.5/3.0 L I4 common rail turbocharged diesel engines)

=== M5OD-R4 ===
- 2002 Ford Explorer XLS (4.0 L SOHC V6 engine)

=== M5R2-RKE ===
- 1989–1995 Ford Thunderbird Super Coupe (3.8 L V6 supercharged engine)
- 1989–1990 Mercury Cougar XR-7 (3.8 L V6 supercharged engine)

== Gallery ==
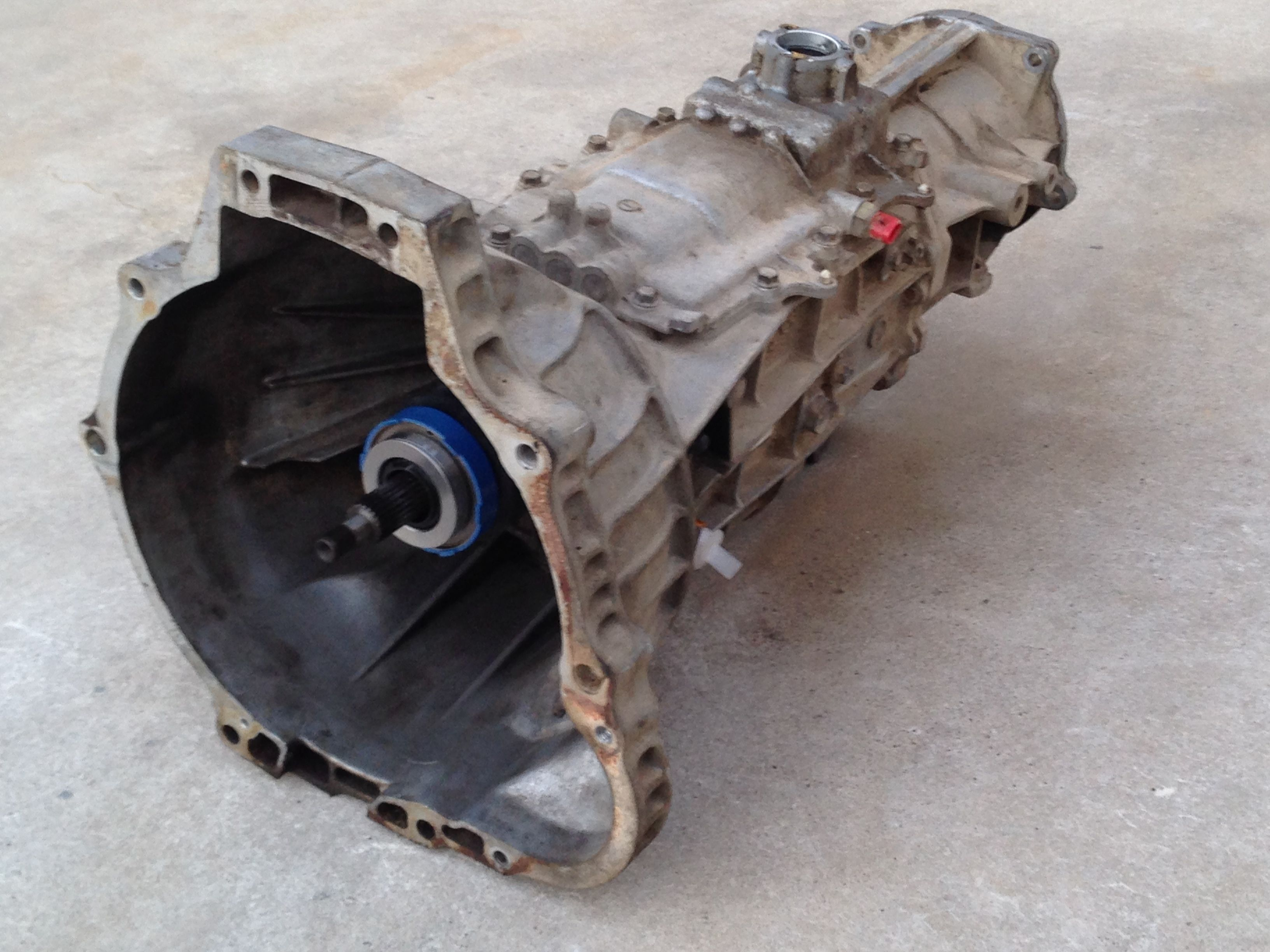
Front view

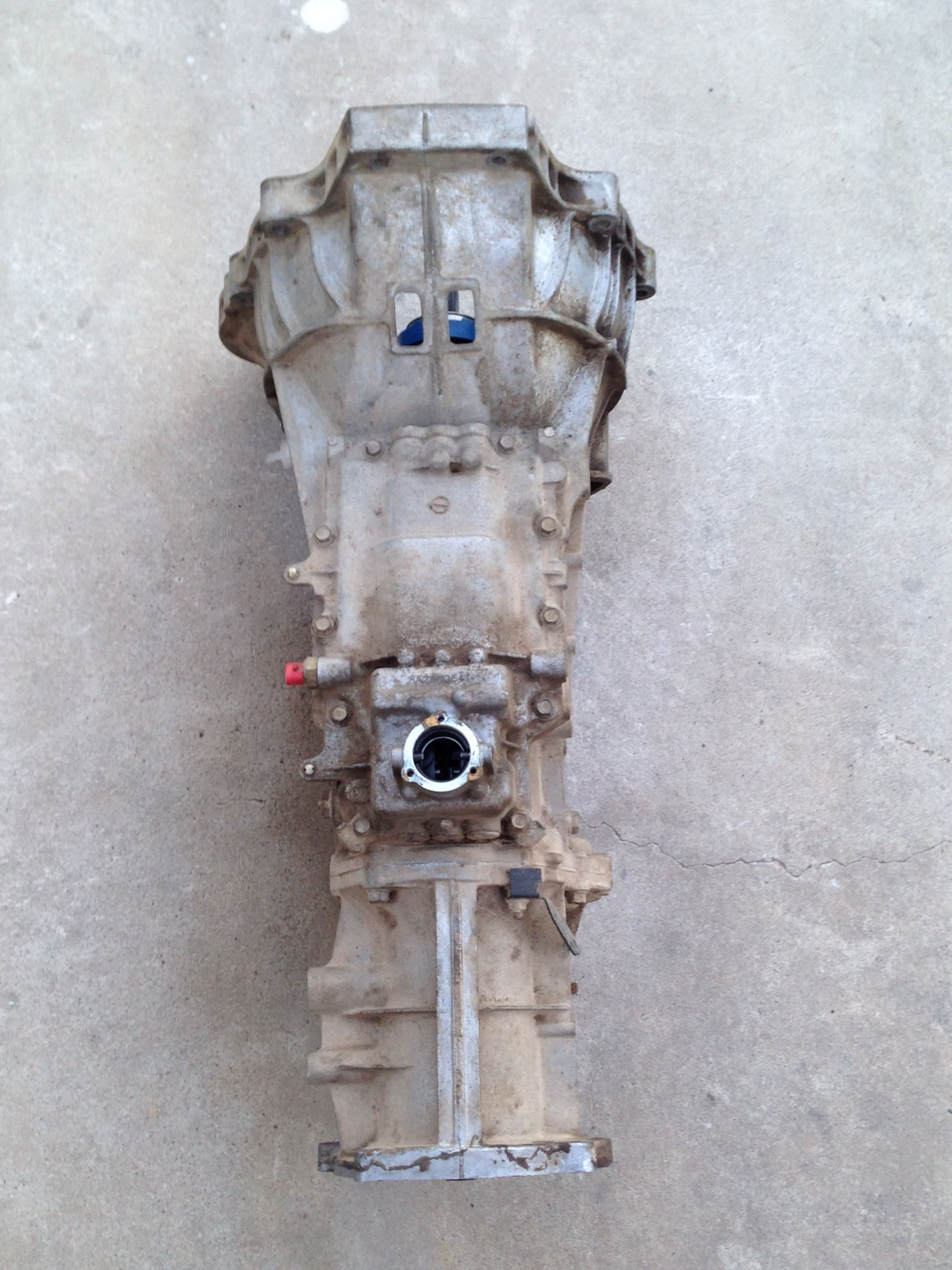
Top view

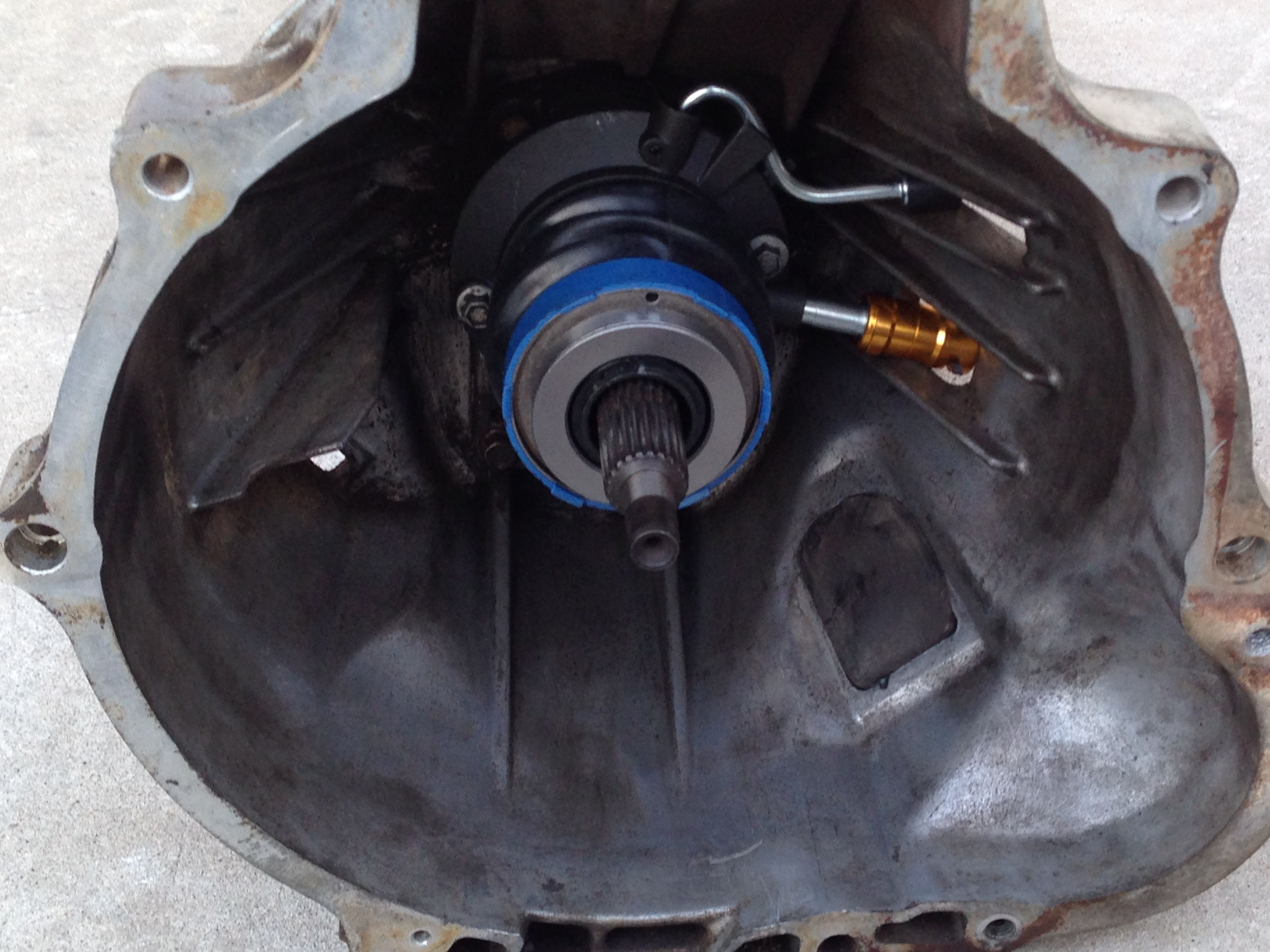
Input shaft

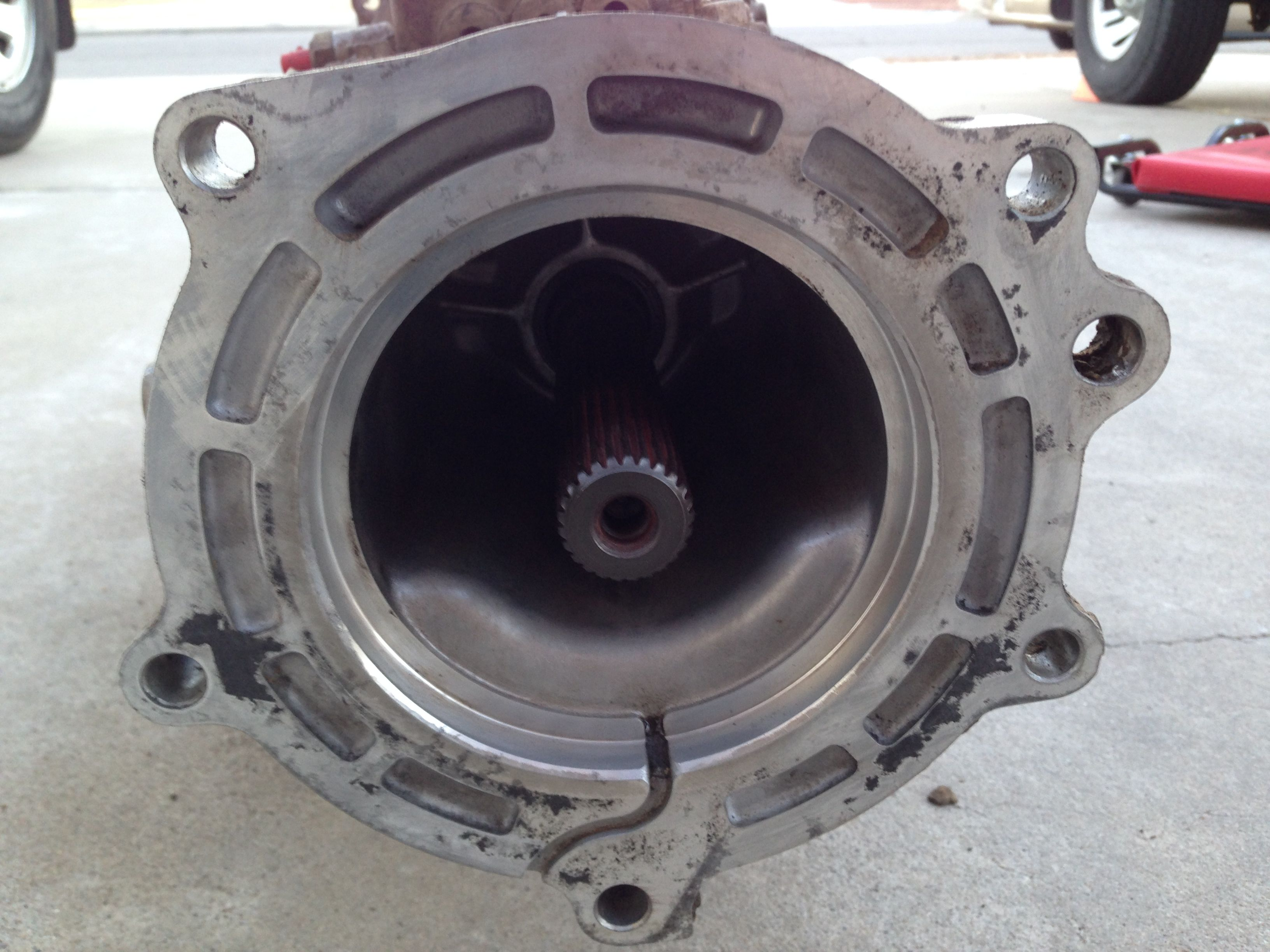
Output shaft
