= Ford AOD transmission =

4-speed automatic from 1980

AOD

Overview
- Manufacturer: Ford Motor Company
- Production: 1980–2014

Body and chassis
- Class: 4-speed longitudinal automatic transmission
- Related: Ford FMX

Chronology
- Predecessor: C4; C5; Ford FMX
- Successor: 6R

The AOD (automatic overdrive) is a four-speed automatic transmission, with the 4th gear as overdrive. Introduced in 1980, it was Ford's first four-speed automatic overdrive transmission. The gearset design is based on the Ford "X" automatic transmissions used during the 1950s, '60s, and '70s. The AOD replaced many of Ford's older transmissions, such as the C4, C5, and light duty applications of the FMX.

== 1980: AOD ==
=== History ===
In 1962 Ford began working on a new type of automatic transmission that would emphasize fuel economy and driveability. The new transmission was built around the Ravigneaux planetary gearset of the "X" transmissions. Where many transmissions had a fourth gear added on as an afterthought, Ford's new transmission was designed with a fourth gear integrated into the gearset. Because it was based on the "X" transmissions, its gear ratios from 1–3 were the same, with the fourth being 0.67:1.

The transmission featured a split-torque application for third gear as well as a lockup in the torque converter. As Ford explained, "Engine power divides. Forty per cent is transmitted hydrodynamically, as in a conventional automatic transmission. The other sixty per cent is transferred mechanically by direct connection between the engine and transmission, which reduces converter slippage and thereby improves fuel economy....However, the torque converter is still in the power path to aid both smooth operations and torque multiplication for acceleration.

The XT-LOD transmission had been initially abandoned in 1966, but the design began again in 1974 because of rising gas prices. The project was shelved with a design that lacked a damper in the torque converter but, after the project was revisited, a damper eventually made its way into the final design. The transmission was introduced when Ford started to downsize its full-size line in 1979. Initially called XT-LOD (Extension Lock-Up Overdrive), its name was changed when revisited in 1974 to FIOD (Ford Integrated Overdrive) and then to its final name in 1979, the Ford AOD transmission.

=== Applications ===
- 1980–1986 Ford LTD
- 1980–1993 Ford Thunderbird
- 1980–1993 Mercury Cougar
- 1984–1993 Ford Mustang
- 1980–1986 Mercury Marquis
- 1983–1993 Ford Econoline
- 1983–1991 Ford LTD Crown Victoria
- 1983–1992 Mercury Grand Marquis
- 1982–1993 Ford Bronco
- 1981–1992 Lincoln Town Car
- 1980–1987 Lincoln Continental
- 1980–1983 Lincoln Continental Mark VI
- 1984–1985 Lincoln Continental Mark VII
- 1986–1992 Lincoln Mark VII
- 1992 Ford Crown Victoria
- 1980–1993 Ford F-150

=== Gear ratios ===
- First: 2.40:1
- Second: 1.47:1
- Third: 1.00:1
- Overdrive: 0.67:1
- Reverse: 2.00:1

== 1992: AOD-E ==
=== History ===
The AOD was redesigned with electronic controls in 1992, becoming the AOD-E. It was primarily intended for the new Modular V8 at first, but it was also adapted to the old AOD bellhousing for vehicles still powered by pushrod engines. While the AOD and AOD-E are like each other (oil pans, casings, bellhousing, and internals), they are not interchangeable with each other, because the AOD-E's shift points are controlled electronically from a combination of solenoids and the Powertrain Control Module (PCM), while the AOD's shift points are hydraulically controlled by a throttle valve rod.

=== Applications ===
- 1992–1994 Lincoln Town Car
- 1992 and up
  - Ford F-150 trucks
  - Ford E-Series vans
- 1993–1994
  - Ford Crown Victoria
  - Mercury Grand Marquis
- 1994–1995 Ford Mustang

=== 1993: 4R 70W ===
A revised version of the AOD-E Transmission was released in 1993 with the Lincoln Mark VIII. Unlike the AOD-E, Reverse, 1st, and 2nd gear ratios in the 4R70-W are numerically higher, giving the transmission a better mechanical advantage and, in turn, better take-off acceleration, better passing acceleration, slightly lower fuel consumption, and designed for better gearset strength; the 4th gear ratio in the 4R70-W is up 0.70:1 from 0.67:1. As a result, fuel economy is slightly increased and downshifting is slightly decreased for less wear. On vehicles powered by the 5.4L V8 engine, a stronger gearset is used than in normal duty 4R70Ws, and Torque Converter stall speeds are also slightly lower due to the 5.4L-engine’s increased low-end torque, as opposed to the 4.6L V8. In 1998, the intermediate one-way roller clutch was replaced with a mechanical diode due to durability concerns, thus providing extra holding capacity and longer service.

4R70W indicates 4 gears, Rear wheel drive, with a maximum input torque of 700 N⋅m (516 lb⋅ft) and Wider gear ratio compared to the AOD-E. Ford document stated that the 2003 "Expedition's 4R70W transmission is rated to handle up to 506 pound-feet of torque, which provides a large performance cushion beyond the peak torque rating of Expedition's largest available engine."

==== Gear ratios ====
- First: 2.84 :1
- Second: 1.55 :1
- Third: 1.00 :1
- Overdrive: 0.70 :1
- Reverse: 2.32 :1

==== Applications ====
- 1993–1998 Lincoln Mark VIII
- 1993–2003 Ford F-150
- 1994–1997 Ford Thunderbird
- 1995–2004 Ford Crown Victoria
- 1996–2001 Ford Explorer
- 1993–2004 Lincoln Town Car
- 1994–1997 Mercury Cougar
- 1995–2004 Mercury Grand Marquis
- 2003 Mercury Marauder
- 1997–2004 Ford Expedition
- 1997–2001 Mercury Mountaineer
- 1996–2004 Ford Mustang
- 2004–2005 Rover 75 V8

=== 2003: 4R 75W ===
In 2003, Ford revised the 4R70W transmission to include: A stronger ring gear that has 24 lugs (as opposed to 6) for the output shaft sensor (OSS) to read from, a revised torque converter, a revised front pump assembly, and a vehicle speed sensor (VSS) that complements the OSS to improve shift quality and efficiency. These improvements allowed the 4R75W to handle more power while being more efficient and economical. While not used on all 2003 model year vehicles, the 4R75W/E transmissions eventually replaced the 4R70W/E.

Newer transmissions that are referred to as 4R70E or 4R75E have modifications that complement Ford's switching to throttle-by-wire. The PCM was given a more powerful microprocessor and Ford added a turbine speed sensor to the transmission. This allows the PCM to know the speed of the input shaft after the torque converter, which is used in combination with crankshaft speed to detect the amount of slipping going on in the torque converter. This information provides PCM with the basis for fully electronic shift scheduling, which limits "hunting", fine-tunes shift speed, and feel. It lets the PCM know what the torque will be in the next gear so it can choose the shift points based on the vehicle's projected performance in the next gear. Coupled with the electronic throttle strategy, the transmission computes the output torque required to maintain the vehicle speed and chooses the correct gear and converter state accordingly.

=== Modification ===
The most practical modification for the 4R70W is the J-mod. It involves modifying the valve body separator plate and gaskets as well as changing or removing accumulator springs to alter the shift timing of the transmission. While these modifications can be done to the 4R75W transmission, the results are not as dramatic, as some of the details of the J-Mod (bigger holes in the separator plate and gasket) were done to the transmission in its design. These modifications are specified by one of the Ford engineers who designed the transmission. It offers faster engagement, quicker shifting, smoother operation, and increased service life. All parts can be bought at Ford dealers for less than $60, including the fluid.

A 20,000+ GVW cooler is highly recommended for all vehicles. Breakdown of the transmission fluid often results in "converter shudder" (it feels like driving over rumble strips) where converter tries to maintain a steady slip rate during lock-up, but alternates between slipping and grabbing. Frequent fluid changes, especially when used for towing, are the single best method to prevent shudder. A shudder occurs because the torque converter never fully enters "lock-up" and ends up bouncing in and out of lock-up to slip. This causes the engine to flare up and then down again as the clutch cannot hold back the power of the engine.

== Applications ==
=== 2002 ===
==== 4R 70W ====
- Ford F-150
- Ford Crown Victoria
- Mercury Grand Marquis
- Lincoln Town Car
- Ford Mustang
- Ford Expedition
- Ford E-Series

=== 2003 ===
==== 4R 75W ====
- Ford Mustang (GT and Mach 1)

==== 4R 70W in trucks ====
- 5.4 L V8
  - Ford F-150
  - Ford E-Series
  - Ford Expedition
- 4.6 L V8
  - Ford E-Series Van
  - Ford F-150
- 4.2 L Ford F-150

==== 4R 70W in cars ====
- 3.8 L V6 Ford Mustang
- Ford Panther platform cars
  - Ford Crown Victoria
  - Mercury Grand Marquis
  - Mercury Marauder
  - Lincoln Town Car

=== 2004 ===
==== 4R 75E ====
- 5.4 L 3 Valve V8 Ford F-150

==== 4R 70E ====
- 4.6 L V8 Ford F-150 (except F-150 Heritage)

==== 4R 75W ====
- Mercury Marauder
- Ford Police Interceptor
- Ford Mustang (GT and Mach 1)
- 5.4 L 2 Valve V8 Trucks
  - Ford E-Series Van
  - Ford Expedition
- Rover 75 V8

==== 4R 70W ====
- 3.9 L V6 Ford Mustang
- 4.6 L V8 Ford E-Series
- 4.6 L V8 Ford Expedition
- Ford Panther platform cars
  - Ford Crown Victoria
  - Mercury Grand Marquis
  - Lincoln Town Car
- Ford F-150 Heritage
  - 4.2 L V6
  - 4.6 L V8
  - 5.4 L V8

=== 2005 ===
==== 4R 75E: 5.4 L 2 Valve and 3 Valve Trucks ====
- Ford F-150
- Ford E-Series
- Ford Expedition

==== 4R 70W ====
- Ford F-150 Heritage (sold only in Mexico)

==== 4R 70E ====
- 4.6 L V8 Ford E-Series
- 4.6 L V8 Ford Panther platform cars
  - Ford Crown Victoria
  - Mercury Grand Marquis
  - Lincoln Town Car
- 4.6 L V8 Ford F-150 except F-150 Heritage (sold only in Mexico)

=== 2006 to 2008 ===
==== 4R 70W ====
- Ford F-150 Heritage (sold only in Mexico)

==== 4R 75E ====
- 2006–2011 Ford Panther platform cars
  - Ford Crown Victoria
  - Mercury Grand Marquis
  - Lincoln Town Car
- 2007–2008 Ford F-150 except F-150 Heritage (sold only in Mexico)
  - 4.2 L V6
  - 2007–2010 4.6 L 2 Valve V8
  - 2004–2008 5.4 L 3 Valve V8
- 2006 Ford Expedition
- 2006–2014 Ford E-Series
  - 4.6 L V8
  - 5.4 L V8

== See also ==
- List of Ford transmissions
