= Powertrain control module =

Automotive component used on motor vehicles

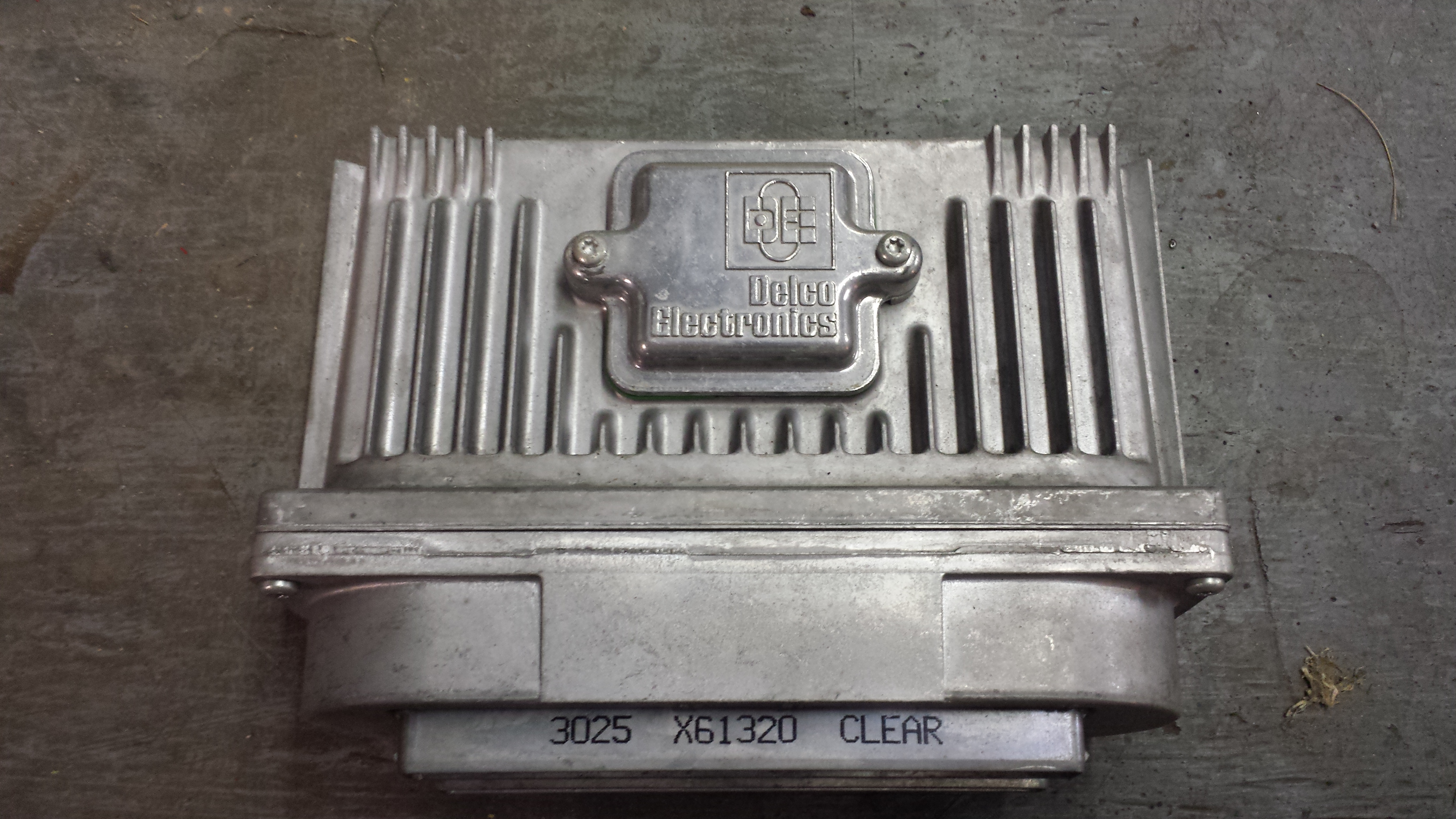
A PCM from a 1996 Chevrolet Beretta

A power-train control module, abbreviated PCM, is an automotive component, a control unit, used on motor vehicles. Today, it is generally a combined controller consisting of the engine control unit (ECU) and the transmission control unit (TCU). On some cars, such as many Chryslers, there are multiple computers: the PCM, the TCU, and the body control module (BCM), for a total of three separate computers. These automotive computers are generally very reliable. The PCM commonly controls more than 100 factors in a car or truck. There are hundreds of error codes that can occur, which indicates that some subsection of the car is experiencing a problem. When one of these errors occurs, usually it will turn on the "check engine" light on the dashboard. The PCM is one of potentially several on-board computers, or essentially the "brain" of the engine control system.

The primary inputs to the PCM come from many sensors, of different types, that are spread around the car. Most of them are oriented toward engine management and performance. These sensors fail at a much higher rate than any of the computers do.

Early use of the powertrain control module dates to the late 1970s. Official phasing in of the PCM occurred during the early 1980s when used in conjunction with electronic controlled carburetors and lockup torque converters. (Conventional 3-speed automatics received lockup converters when overdrives were introduced.)

== Other names ==
- PCM: Powertrain control module (Ford, GM, JLR)
- PCU: Powertrain control unit
- ECM: Engine control module
- ICU: Injection control unit (Peugeot, Citroën, Fiat, Alfa Romeo, Lancia)
- DME/DDE: Digital motor electronics / digital diesel electronics (BMW, Mini)
- ECU: Electronic control unit / engine control unit

== Bibliography ==
- Duffy, James E. (2003). Modern Automotive Technology (6th ed.). Goodheart-Willcox Company. ISBN 1-59070-186-0.
- Ribbens, William B. (2002). Understanding Automotive Electronics (6th ed.). Elsevier. ISBN 0-08-048149-3.
