= XMODS =

Brand of model radio-controlled car

XMODS were 1:28 scale electric radio-controlled cars. Originally invented by Nobuaki Ogihara in Japan, XMODS were released with several body styles over multiple generations. Due to the popularity of tuner culture in the early to mid 2000's, the cars' primary marketing focus was on customization. This was reflected by the various first party body kits and upgrades released with XMODS. The cars were distributed by RadioShack in the United States, by Hobby Products International (HPI Racing) in Japan, Mirage RC in the U.K. (Distributor of HPI Products in the U.K.), and by Carson Modellsport (Subdivision of Tamiya Germany) in Europe.

Nissan Skyline with available body kit.

== Models ==
=== XMODS Generation 1 ===
The original, first-generation XMODS were released in the Fall of 2003, featuring semi-proportional steering and modular construction enabling parts to be swapped. Eleven body styles were released with several colors and a body exclusive to Europe and Asia.

For XMODS released through RadioShack and HPI, each car came with a mini-magazine (Super Street for the Japanese models and Hot Rod for the American models), featuring write-ups on selected models and upgrade accessories.

1999 Nissan Skyline GT-R R34 V.spec

- Yellow
- Black
- Blue (Available only in Europe and Asia through Carson and HPI respectively.)

1997 Toyota Supra

- Red
- White

2000 Honda Civic Si Coupe

- Blue
- Black

2003 Acura RSX

Released as the Honda Integra in non-U.S. Markets

- Silver

2004 Acura NSX

Released as the Honda NSX in non-U.S. Markets

- Yellow
- White (Available only in Europe and Asia through Carson and HPI respectively.)

2004 Nissan 350Z

- Copper
- Silver (Available only in Europe and Asia through Carson and HPI respectively)

2003 Chevrolet Corvette C5

- Silver

1967 Chevrolet Camaro

- Red

1965 Ford Mustang Fastback

- Light Blue

2004 Subaru Impreza WRX STI

- Blue
- White (Available only in Asia through HPI)
- Orange Super Taikyu HPI Racing (Available only in the UK and Asia through Mirage and HPI respectively)
- Yellow Super Taikyu Fujitsubo Racing (Available only in the U.K. and Asia through Mirage RC and HPI respectively)

2004 Mercedes-Benz SLR McLaren

- Silver (Available only in Europe and Asia through Carson and HPI respectively)

In addition to body kits for the models above, other body shells were available separately. These came with matching body kits, controller steering wheels, and compatible drive shafts.

1997 Toyota Supra

- Silver

2003 Acura RSX

Released as the Honda Integra in non-U.S. Markets

- Black

2004 Ford Mustang Cobra

- Red

=== XMODS Evolution ===
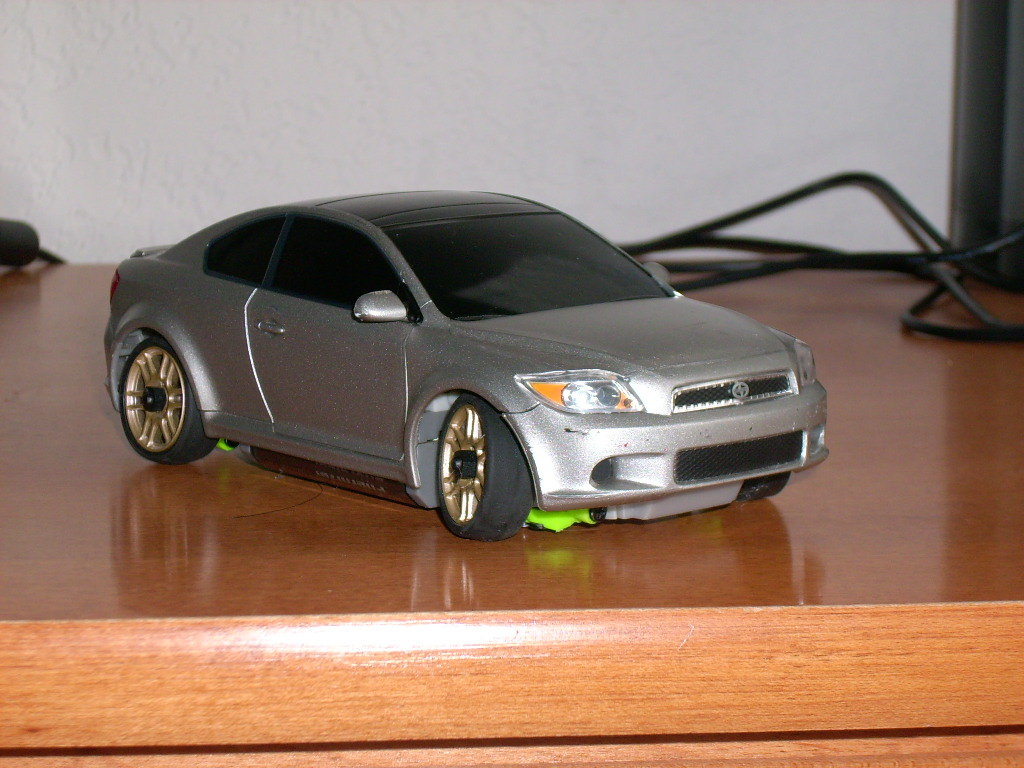
Stock silver Scion tC

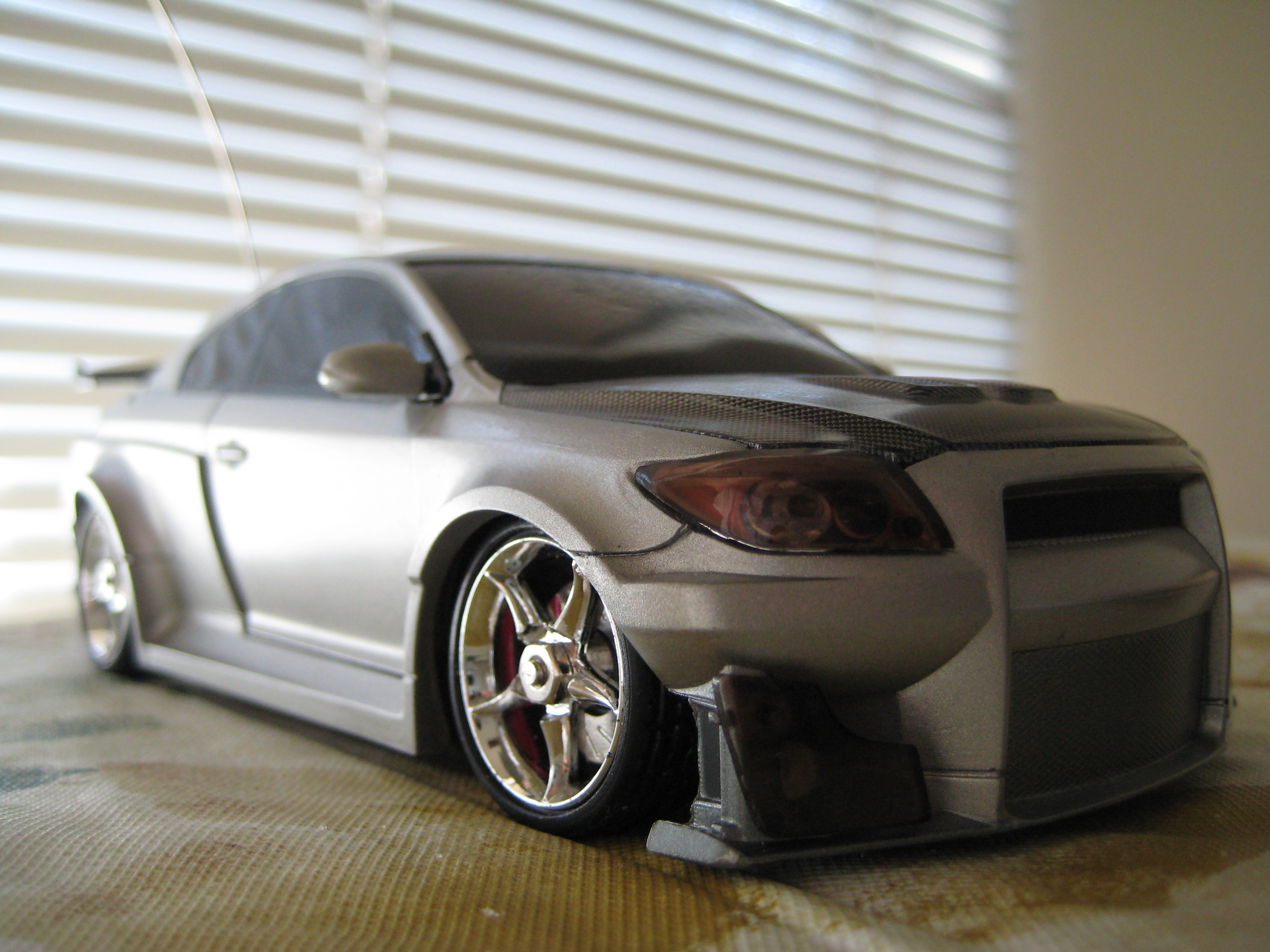
Silver Scion tC with retired Wild Body kit inspired by Five Axis

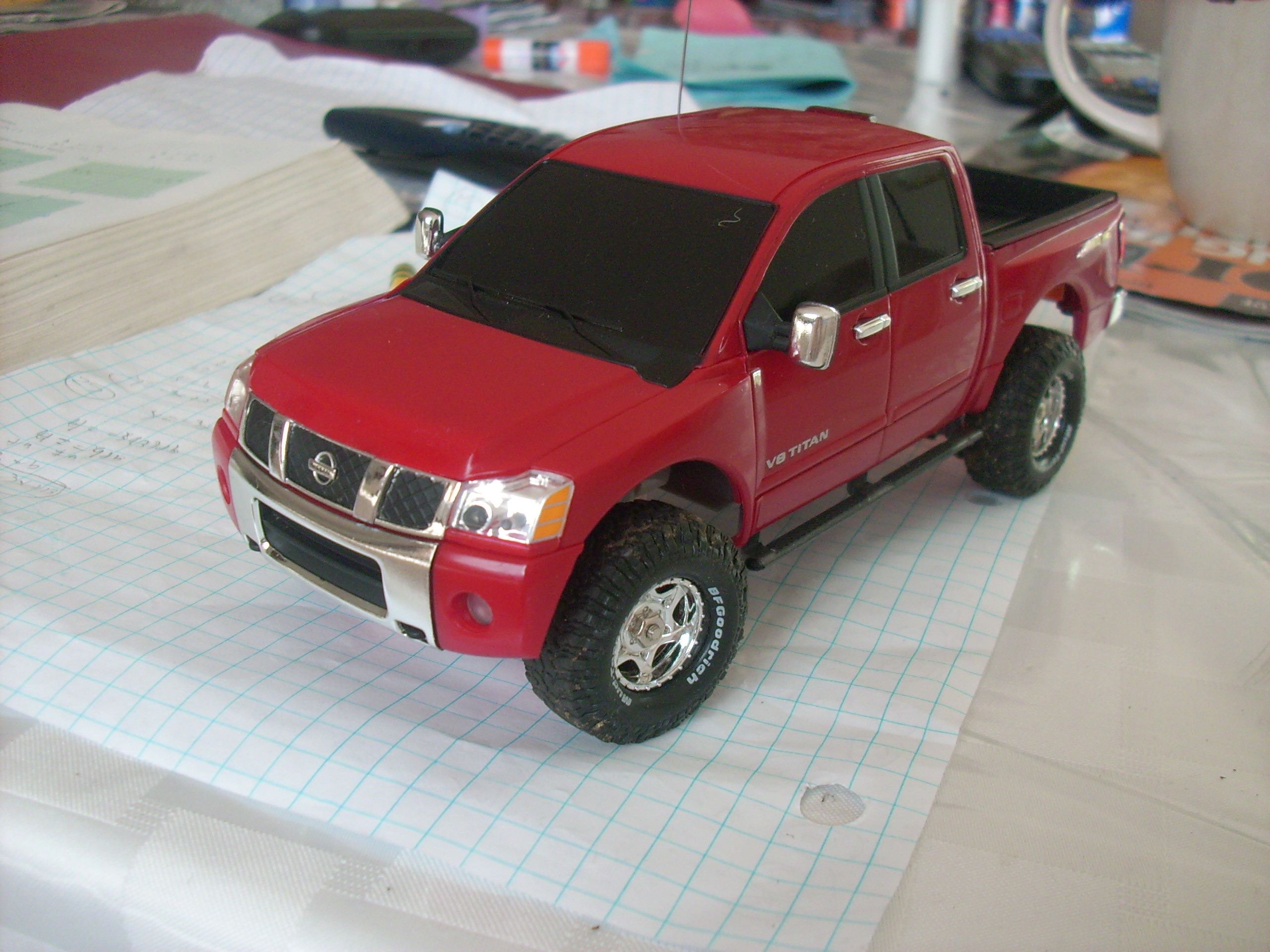
Red Nissan Titan with retired Off-Road Kit

The XMODS Evolution models were released in the Autumn of 2005 with substantial construction differences when compared to the previous XMODS Generation 1 generation:

- The electronics were vastly improved, with one main board compared versus two for the Generation 1 chassis.
- The motor was mounted transversely in contrast to Generation 1's longitudinal layout.
- The battery housing was moved to the bottom for better weight distribution.
- Suspension design was revamped.
- The servo housing was integrated into the chassis.
- New body clip system that no longer required a locking mechanism on the chassis.
- A new truck chassis was released that provided more ground clearance and an articulating chassis.

Despite these differences, it was still possible to swap bodies wheels between the Evolution and Generation 1 cars. Some models sold outside the U.S. by Carson and HPI featured repainted Generation 1 bodies. Like the previous generation models, each XMODS Evolution car came with a Super Street (Japanese models) or Hot Rod (American models) mini-magazine. Truck models had a Truckin' mini-magazine. The XMODS Evolution generation was eventually discontinued in mid-2007.

1967 Pontiac Firebird

- Purple

2006 Ford Mustang

- Dark Blue

2005 Infiniti G35

- Red

2006 Scion tC

- Silver

2004 Mitsubishi Lancer Evolution VIII

- Gray

2005 Ford F-150

- Orange

2006 Nissan Titan

- Red

2004 Hummer H2

- Black
- Yellow (Available only in Europe through Carson)
- Red (Available only in Europe through Carson)

2003 Porsche Cayenne Turbo

- Black (Available only in Europe through Carson)
- White (Available only in Europe through Carson)
- Silver (Available only in Europe through Carson)

1999 Nissan Skyline GT-R R34 V.spec

- Silver (Available only in Europe through Carson)

1967 Chevrolet Camaro

- Orange (Available only in Europe through Carson)

1965 Ford Mustang Coupe

- Dark Blue (Available only in Europe through Carson)

2004 Nissan 350Z

- Blue version (Available only in Europe through Carson)

In addition to body kits for the models above, the following body shells were available separately. With the exception of the lexan bodies, they came with a body kit, controller steering wheel, and compatible chassis extension piece.

2005 Ford F-150

- Blue

2006 BMW 320si

- Black (Lexan body available only in Europe through Carson)
- White (Lexan body available only in Europe through Carson)

=== XMODS Evolution Transformers ===
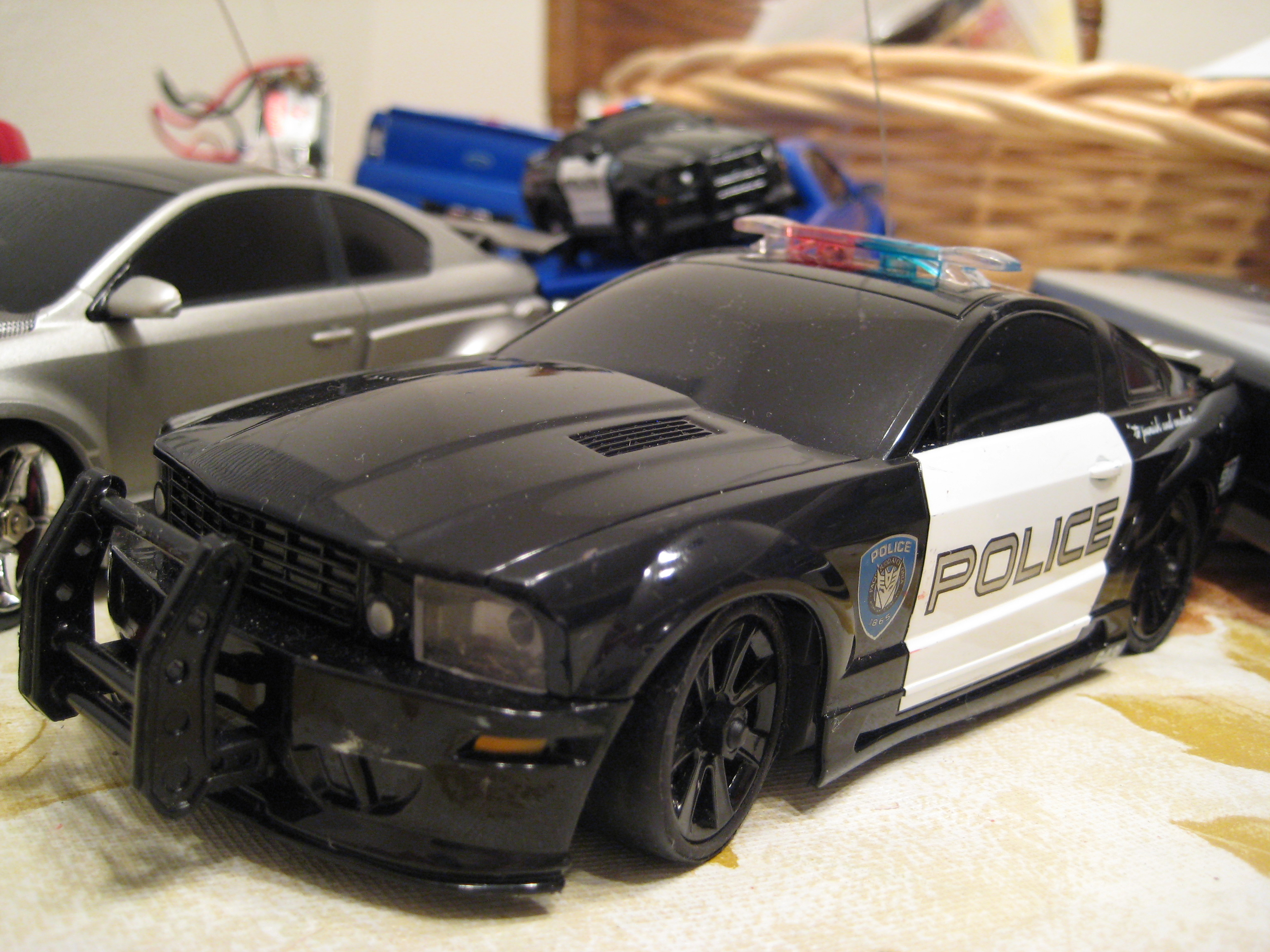
Stock Xmods based on Transformers' Barricade

In June 2007, RadioShack released two XMODS Evolution models to coincide with the release of the film Transformers. Unlike other XMODS, which came in reusable plastic cases, these models came in cardboard boxes. Special body and light kits were available for these models.

Bumblebee (2009 Chevrolet Camaro Concept)

- Yellow with Black Stripes
- Optional accessory kit included a light kit, hood-mounted cannon, and door-mounted missile launchers.

Barricade (2007 Saleen S281 Police Car)

- Black with White Doors
- Optional accessory kit included flashing lights for the light bar, headlight claws, and a hood-mounted missile launcher.

=== XMODS Evolution Street ===
The XMODS Evolution Street generation was confirmed in mid-2008 via RadioShack employee memos and were released on October of that year. Compared to the previous XMODS Evolution generation, the Evolution Street had several differences:

- The RX/TX crystals were no longer removable and were soldered onto the electronics board and inside the controller.
- Foam inserts in the XMODS carrying box were replaced with thermoformed plastic.
- Mini-magazines were no longer included. Flame and XMODS decals were still included.
- Rubber was used to protect parts of the motor.
- Thicker plastic wheel bearings, reducing wheel wobble, a concern with older XMODS Evolution models.
- Rear A-Arms and motor cradle were reinforced.
- There were no body kit options for any of the cars. The bumpers and spoiler were molded onto the body of all of the cars.

In late 2010, the Evolution Street generation was discontinued.

2008 Nissan GT-R

- Silver

1965 Ford Mustang

- Black

2008 Chevrolet Corvette C6 Z06

- Atomic Orange

2008 Audi R8

- Gunmetal

2010 Ford Mustang

- Burgundy

2009 Nissan 370Z

- Red

2009 Dodge Challenger SRT-8

- Orange

=== XMODS Micro RC ===
Chevrolet Camaro SS

Chevrolet Corvette

Along with the release of the XMODS Evolution Street models, RadioShack relaunched the ZipZaps Micro RC line under the XMODS Micro banner. Aside from the new labels that bear the XMODS Micro RC logo, the packaging was similar to the ZipZaps line. All parts (e.g. motors, wheel covers, bodies, etc.) on the XMODS Micro line were compatible between ZipZaps and vice versa, with the exception of the 2009 models, which have one-piece wheels that do not allow the swapping of wheel covers. The cars use the traditional box-type controller, as opposed to the gun-type controller used in the ZipZaps SE line.

1959 Chevrolet Corvette

- Red

1967 Chevrolet Camaro SS

- Blue

2009 Nissan GT-R

- Silver

2009 Mitsubishi Lancer Evolution X

- Red

=== XMODS Generation 3 ===
In Fall 2013, RadioShack released a new XMODS with two brand-new chassis designs, touring and buggy. The new models were 1:24 in scale as opposed to the previous generations' 1:28. This generation of XMODS did not have licensing from any automotive maker. In lieu of this, generic bodies were used along with bodies modeled after the Kamata SYNCi, Lucky & Wild Evolver, and Kamata RC410 from the Ridge Racer video game series. New features include a 2.4 GHz radio, a lithium-ion battery upgrade, and staggered tires. Two other bodies are also available separately, one in a set with lights, and the other in a set with a "nitrous boost" ultracapacitor that allows a 3- to 5-second speed boost when a button on the controller is pressed. Other upgrades that were available were extra tires, a high speed rear end, rear end with a faster motor, and an all wheel drive upgrade. In 2015, the Generation 3 XMODS were discontinued.

== Modifications ==
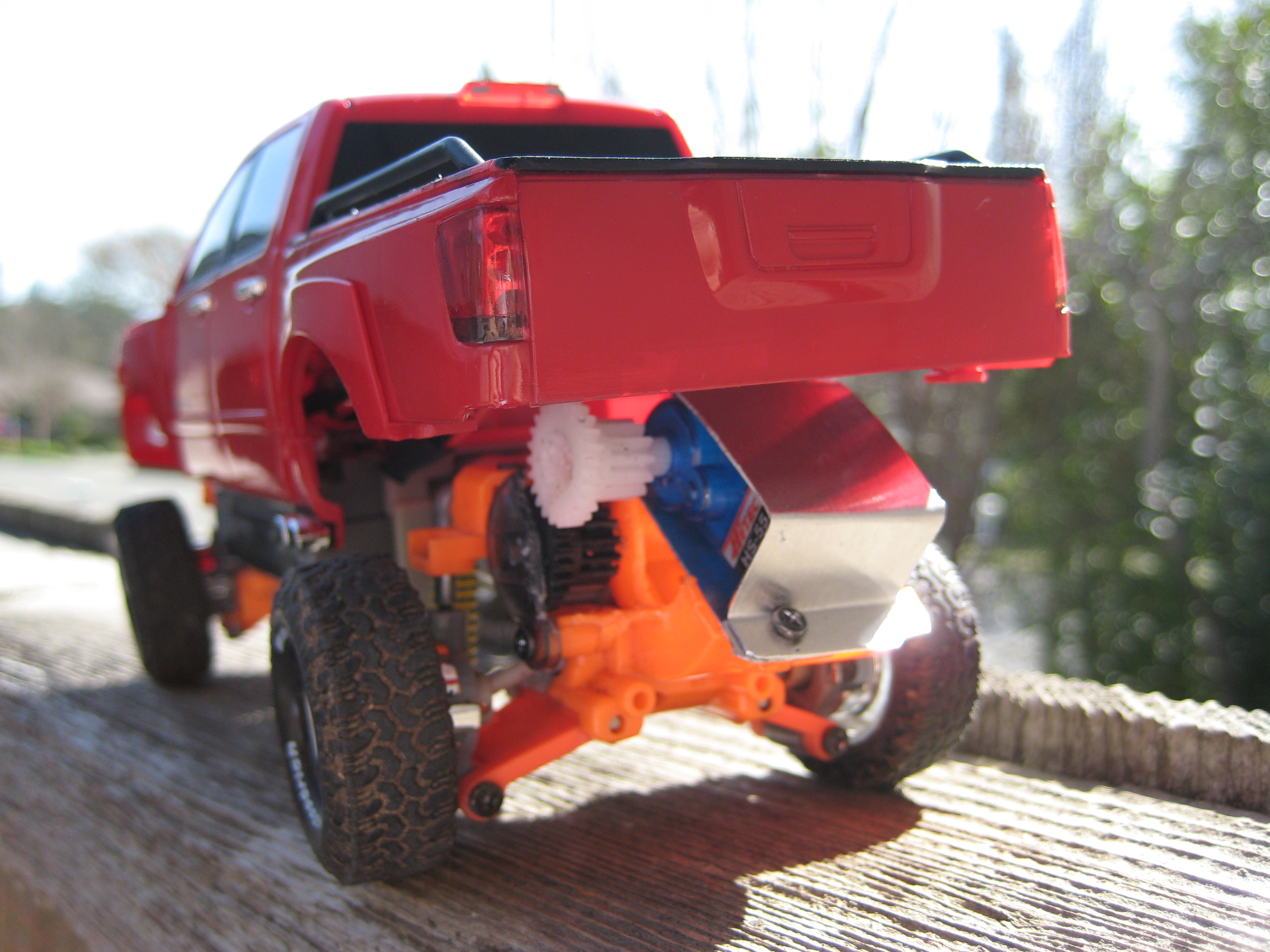
Nissan Titan Xmods with a servo modification

XMODS can be extensively modified using parts supplied by RadioShack and other aftermarket vendors. The starter kits advertise the ability to change the motor, wheels, tires, trim kit, springs/shocks, and bearings (From nylon bushings to steel bearings), add lighting kits, and, in some generations, swap the crystal to allow the cars to operate on multiple frequencies.

Tutorials for modifications are also available on various XMODS forum sites. In Japan, HPI distributes XMODS, in Europe distributed by CARSON Modellsport, with the cars having the same colors as those offered in the U.S. by RadioShack, but also some exclusive body colors and body tops not available to the US market.

Even though each model has a different body, all models in a particular line share the same or similar chassis. The most notable difference in the chassis is its length relative to its body top. You can also add motor upgrades onto them for faster speeds.

While using non-RadioShack upgrades, it is possible to achieve up to and over 40 MPH.

Some people have used servo motors in their XMODS trucks to achieve higher torque, resulting in easier crawling, but with a very limited top speed.

People have replaced the stock electronics with hobby grade electronics to improve smoothness of the servo, improving the top speed, and range.
