= 1997 12 Hours of Sebring =

Sports car endurance race held at Sebring International Raceway, Sebring, Florida, USA

The 45th Superflo 12 Hours of Sebring presented by Chrysler was an endurance racing sports car event held at Sebring International Raceway from March 13–16, 1997. The race served as the second round of the 1997 IMSA GT Championship. The #3 Team Scandia Ferrari 333 SP took the overall victory driven by Yannick Dalmas, Stefan Johansson, Fermín Vélez, and Andy Evans.

== Race results ==
Class winners in bold.

Pos	Class	No	Team	Drivers	Car	Tyre	Laps
1	**WSC**	**3**	(United States) **Team Scandia**	(France) **Yannick Dalmas** (Sweden) **Stefan Johansson** (Spain) **Fermín Vélez** (United States) **Andy Evans**	**Ferrari 333 SP**	**G**	**281**
2	WSC	16	(United States) Dyson Racing	(United Kingdom) James Weaver (United Kingdom) Andy Wallace (United States) Butch Leitzinger	Riley & Scott Mk III	**G**	281
3	WSC	4	(Peru) Dibos Racing	(Peru) Eduardo Dibós Chappuis (United States) Jim Pace (United States) Barry Waddell	Riley & Scott Mk III	**P**	268
4	WSC	63	(United States) Downing/Atlanta Racing	(United States) Jim Downing (United States) Charlie Nearburg (United States) Tim McAdam	Kudzu DLM	**G**	266
5	WSC	20	(United States) Dyson Racing	(United States) Elliott Forbes-Robinson (United States) John Schneider (United States) John Paul Jr.	Riley & Scott Mk III	**G**	263
6	**GTS-1**	**11**	(United States) **Robinson Racing**	(United States) **Irv Hoerr** (United States) **Jack Baldwin** (United States) **George Robinson**	**Oldsmobile Aurora**	**G**	**261**
7	GTS-1	01	(United States) Rohr Corp.	(United States) Jochen Rohr (United States) Andy Pilgrim (United Kingdom) Robert Nearn	Porsche 911 GT2	**P**	261
8	**GTS-2**	**61**	(Austria) **Konrad Motorsport**	(France) **Bob Wollek** (Austria) **Franz Konrad** (Germany) **Wido Rössler**	**Porsche 911 GT2**	**P**	**259**
9	**GTS-3**	**10**	(United States) **Prototype Technology Group**	(Costa Rica) **Javier Quiros** (United States) **Tom Hessert** (United States) **Bill Auberlen** (United States) **Derek Hill**	**BMW M3 E36**	**Y**	**257**
10	GTS-2	03	(Germany) Roock Racing	(Germany) Claudia Hürtgen (France) Michel Ligonnet (United States) Zak Brown (United States) Dirk Layer	Porsche 911 GT2	**MI**	256
11	GTS-2	99	(United States) Schumacher Racing	(United States) Larry Schumacher (United States) John O'Steen (United States) Will Pace	Porsche 993	**P**	256
12	GTS-2	56	(United States) Martin Snow	(United States) Martin Snow (United States) Peter Kitchak (United States) Philip Collin	Porsche 911 GT2	?	255
13	GTS-3	76	(United States) Team A.R.E.	(United States) Kelly Collins (United States) Cort Wagner (United States) Gary Blackman	Porsche 993 Carrera RSR	**Y**	255
14	GTS-3	52	(Switzerland) Stadler Motorsport	(Switzerland) Lilian Bryner (Switzerland) Enzo Calderari (Germany) Ulli Richter	Porsche 964	**P**	253
15	GTS-3	7	(United States) Prototype Technology Group	(Austria) Dieter Quester (Belgium) Marc Duez (United States) Boris Said	BMW M3 E36	**Y**	252
16	WSC	88	(United States) MSI Racing	(Canada) Ross Bentley (United States) Jeff Jones (United States) Danny Sullivan	Riley & Scott Mk III	**G**	250
17	GTS-3	39	(United States) Jim Matthews Racing	(United States) David Murry (United States) Jim Matthews (United States) Hurley Haywood	Porsche 993	?	249
18	GTS-1	75	(United States) Robinson Racing	(Canada) Victor Sifton (United States) Jon Gooding (United States) Joe Pezza	Oldsmobile Aurora	**G**	248
19 DNF	GTS-3	50	(Costa Rica) Jorge Trejos	(United States) Joe Varde (Costa Rica) Jorge Trejos (United States) Dennis Aase	Porsche 993	**P**	247
20	GTS-2	65	(United States) Saleen Allen Speedlab	(United States) Steve Saleen (United Kingdom) David Warnock (United Kingdom) Robert Schirle	Saleen Mustang	?	246
21	GTS-3	68	(United States) The Racer's Group	(United States) Kevin Buckler (United States) Stephen Earle (United States) Randy Pobst	Porsche 993	?	246
22	GTS-3	78	(United States) Team A.R.E.	(United States) Mike Doolin (United States) Steve Pelke (United States) Bruce Busby	Porsche 964 Carrera RSR	**Y**	245
23	GTS-3	53	(Switzerland) Stadler Motorsport	(Switzerland) Denis Lay (Germany) Karl-Heinz Wlazik (Switzerland) Uwe Sick	Porsche 964 Carrera RSR	**P**	245
24	GTS-3	25	(United States) Alex Job Racing	(United States) Charles Slater (United States) Jeff Purner (United States) Terry Lingner (United States) Robbie Groff	Porsche 964 Carrera RSR	?	242
25	GTS-3	86	(United States) G&W Motorsports	(United States) Steve Marshall (United States) Danny Marshall (United States) Weldon Scrogham	Porsche 993 Cup	**D**	240
26	GTS-3	89	(United States) Tag Racing	(United States) Thomas Dittmer (United States) Jason Dittmer (United States) Tone Grant (United States) Mike Gagliardo	Porsche 993	?	236
27	WSC	2	(United States) Screaming Eagles Racing	(United States) Craig T. Nelson (United States) Darin Brassfield (United States) Dan Clark	Riley & Scott Mk III	?	233
28	GTS-3	58	(United States) Protechnik Racing	(United States) Sam Shalala (United States) John Annis (Germany) Neil Crilly (United States) Scott Peeler	Porsche 993	**G**	229
29	GTS-3	69	(Costa Rica) Jorge Trejos	(United States) Jeff Gamroth (United States) Tim Ralston (United States) Monte Shelton	Porsche 993	?	227
30	GTS-3	05	(United States) Auto Sport South	(United States) Joe Cogbill (United States) William Stitt (United States) John Bourassa	Porsche 993	?	224
31	GTS-3	92	(United States) PAR International, Ltd.	(United States) David Loring (United States) Raymond Boissoneau (United States) Peter Goebel (United States) Brian Johnson	Mazda RX-7	**G**	218
32	GTS-3	26	(United States) Alex Job Racing	(United States) Anthony Lazzaro (Italy) Angelo Cilli (United States) Eric Bretzel	Porsche 993	**Y**	216
33	GTS-3	70	(United States) Newfield/Cartman	(Italy) Ludovico Manfredi (United States) Alain Nadal (Greece) Manolis Manchous (United States) Ron Zitza	Porsche 993	**P**	210
34 DNF	GTS-2	47	(United States) T-F Racing	(United States) Matt Turner (United States) Gary R. Smith (United States) Joseph Safina (United States) John Kohler (United States) Nick Longhi	Saleen Mustang	?	205
35 DNF	WSC	28	(United States) FAB Factory Motorsport	(United States) Jon Field (Chile) Juan Gac (Canada) Jacek Mucha (United States) A.J. Smith (United States) Owen Trinkler	Spice SC95	**G**	203
36	GTS-3	36	(United States) Phoenix American Motorsports	(United States) Jim Michaelian (United States) Steve McNeely (United States) Stu Hayner (United States) John Heinricy (United States) Mike Weinberg (United States) Joe Aquilante (United States) Marty Miller	Pontiac Firebird	?	201
37	GTS-1	90	(United States) Road Circuit Technology	(United States) Les Delano (United States) Andy Petery (United States) Craig Carter	Oldsmobile Cutlass Supreme	**G**	199
38 DNF	WSC	8	(United States) Support Net Racing	(United States) Johnny O'Connell (United States) Scott Schubot (United States) Henry Camferdam (United States) Roger Mandeville	Hawk C-8	**Y**	188
39	GTS-1	48	(United States) Ted Kempgens	(United States) David Rankin (United States) Hank Scott (United States) Billy Bies (United States) Ted Kempgens	Chevrolet Camaro	**G**	188
40	WSC	33	(United States) FAB Factory Motorsport	(United States) Ralph Thomas (United States) John Mirro (United States) Rick Ferguson	Kudzu DG-2	?	185
41	GTS-1	09	(United States) Rice Racing	(United States) Vic Rice (United States) Ray Kong (United States) Shane Lewis (United States) Kent Stacy	Pontiac Grand Prix	**G**	180
42 DNF	GTS-3	27	(United States) Tim Vargo	(United States) Brady Refenning (United States) Jack Refenning (United States) Peter Uria	Porsche 911	**P**	178
43 DNF	WSC	30	(Italy) Moretti Racing	(Italy) Giampiero Moretti (Brazil) Antônio Hermann (Belgium) Didier Theys (Italy) Andrea Montermini	Ferrari 333 SP	**Y**	168
44 DNF	WSC	1	(United States) Doyle Racing/Riley & Scott	(South Africa) Wayne Taylor (Belgium) Eric van de Poele (United States) Scott Sharp	Riley & Scott Mk III	**P**	151
45	GTS-1	80	(United States) Dave Perelle	(United States) Nort Northam (United States) Dave Perelle (United States) Houghton Smith	Oldsmobile Cutlass Supreme	**G**	148
46 DNF	GTS-3	6	(United States) Prototype Technology Group	(United States) John Fergus (United States) Dan Marvin	BMW M3 E36	**Y**	142
47	GTS-1	37	(United States) Hoyt Overbagh	(Italy) Mauri Casadei (Italy) Oscar Rovelli (United States) Butch Brickell (United States) Mark Montgomery (United States) C.J. Johnson	Chevrolet Camaro	**G**	141
48 DNF	WSC	43	(United States) Team Scandia	(United States) Charles Morgan (United States) Rob Morgan	Ferrari 333 SP	**G**	135
49 DNF	GTS-3	42	(United States) Jarrett Freeman	(United States) Michael Duffy (United States) Simon Gregg	Porsche 993	?	134
50 DNF	WSC	60	(United States) Kopf Precision Race Products Team	(Mexico) Roberto Quintanilla (United States) Jeff Ward	Keiler KII	**G**	126
51 DNF	GTS-1	66	(United States) Panoz Motorsports	(United States) Doc Bundy (France) Éric Bernard (United States) Jeff Purner	Panoz GTR-1	**MI**	108
52 DNF	GTS-3	93	Ecuador Mobil	(Ecuador) Henry Taleb (United States) Pete Halsmer (United States) Elton Julian	Nissan 240SX	**Y**	103
53 DNF	GTS-1	74	(United States) Champion Porsche	(Germany) Hans-Joachim Stuck (Canada) Bill Adam	Porsche 911 GT2	**P**	100
54 DNF	GTS-2	55	(United States) Saleen Allen Speedlab	(United States) Price Cobb (United Kingdom) Phil Andrews	Saleen Mustang	**G**	92
55 DNF	GTS-1	35	(United States) Richard McDill	(United States) Richard McDill (United States) Bill McDill (United States) Tom Juckette (Italy) Gianni Biava	Chevrolet Camaro	**Y**	90
56	GTS-3	57	(United States) Kryderacing	(United States) Luis Sereix (United States) Reed Kryder (United States) Frank Del Vecchio (United Kingdom) Michael DeFontes	Nissan 240SX	**G**	85
57 DNF	GTS-3	22	(United States) Resiman Racing	(United States) Paul Reisman (United States) John Reisman (United States) Richard Valentine	Chevrolet Camaro	?	73
58 DNF	GTS-3	38	(United States) Mark Hein	(United States) Dorsey Schroeder (United States) Peter Cunningham (United States) John Green	Acura NSX	**Y**	58
59	GTS-1	17	(United States) Art Pilla	(United States) Arthur Pilla (United States) Oma Kimbrough (United States) David Kicak	Porsche 911 GT2	?	58
60 DNF	GTS-1	72	(United States) Tim Banks	(United States) Tim Banks (Switzerland) Henri-Louis Maunoir (United States) Don Arpin	Chevrolet Corvette	?	57
61 DNF	GTS-2	31	(United States) Kim Baker	(United States) John Heinricy (United States) Stuart Jones (United States) Kim Baker	Chevrolet Corvette	?	29
62 DNF	GTS-1	45	(United States) Davies Motorsports	(Canada) Scott Goodyear (Peru) Neto Jochamowitz (United States) Ed Davies	Porsche 964 Turbo	?	21
63 DNF	WSC	00	(United States) John Christie	(Canada) John Graham (United Kingdom) Robin Smith	X-250 WSC	**P**	21
DNS	GTS-3	98	(United States) Tag Racing	(United States) Thomas Dittmer (United States) Jason Dittmer	Porsche 993 Carrera RSR	?	0
DNS	GTS-3	34	(United States) James Loftis	(United States) Jim Loftis (United States) Richard Howe	Porsche 968	**D**	0
DNS	GTS-3	06	(United States) Jeremiah Kelly	(United States) Marc Fienstein (United States) Randy Pobst	Porsche 944	?	0
