= ZipZaps =

Miniature remote-controlled cars

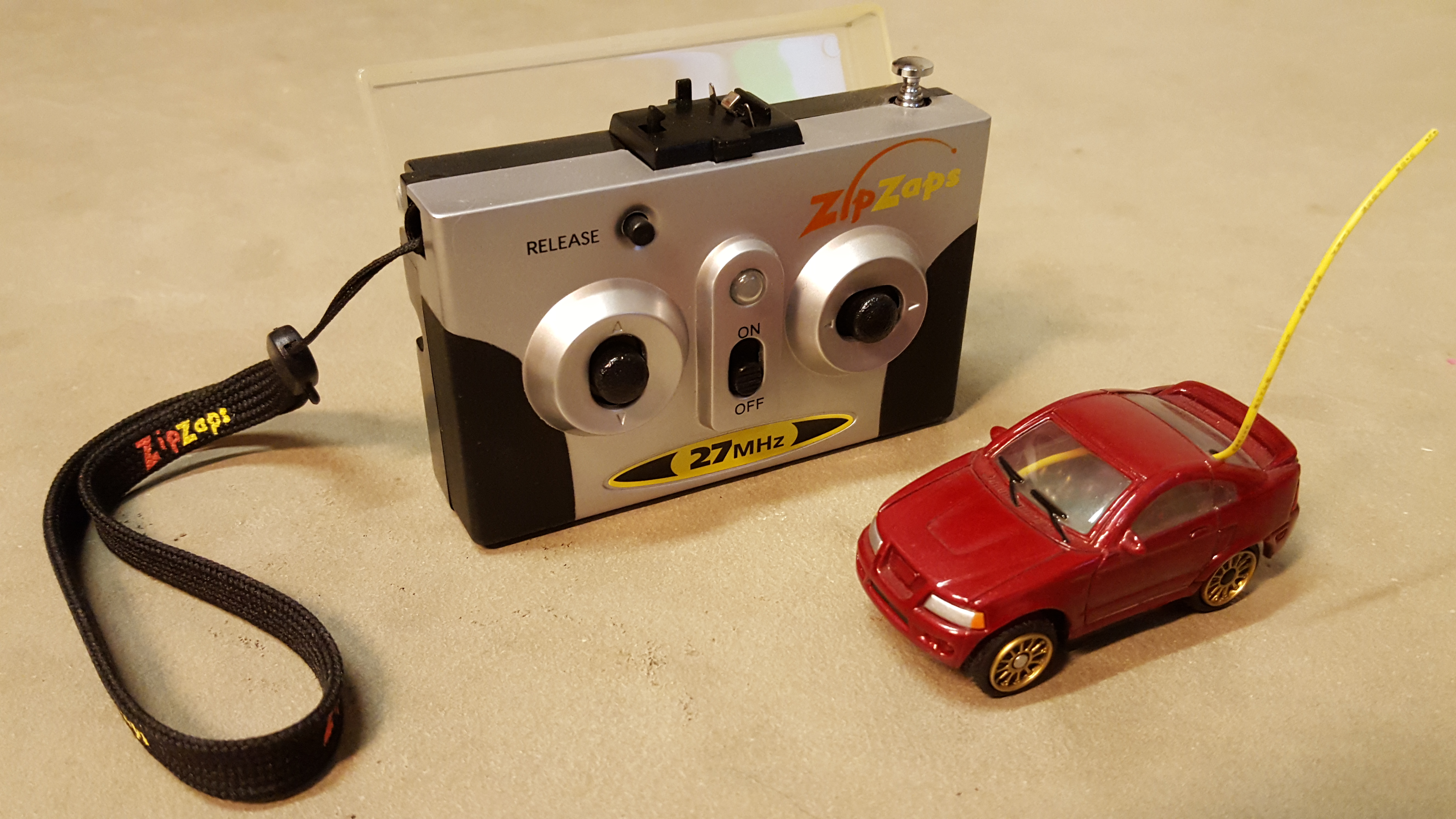
A red Ford Mustang ZipZaps toy with remote control.

ZipZaps are miniature radio-controlled cars that were sold by RadioShack, later marketed under the brand name XMODS Micro RC. They were commonly compared to Tomy's Bit Char-G (sold in the U.S. as MicroSizers) and Takara's Digi-Q micro R/C lines.

== Overview ==
First introduced in September 2002, ZipZaps were an instant success and one of the most popular gifts of the holiday season in North America, with RadioShack stores often selling out of the starter kits. They were referred to as "micro R/C" due to their diminutive size. At around 1:64 scale, ZipZaps were only slightly larger than popular die-cast toy cars such as Hot Wheels and Matchbox.

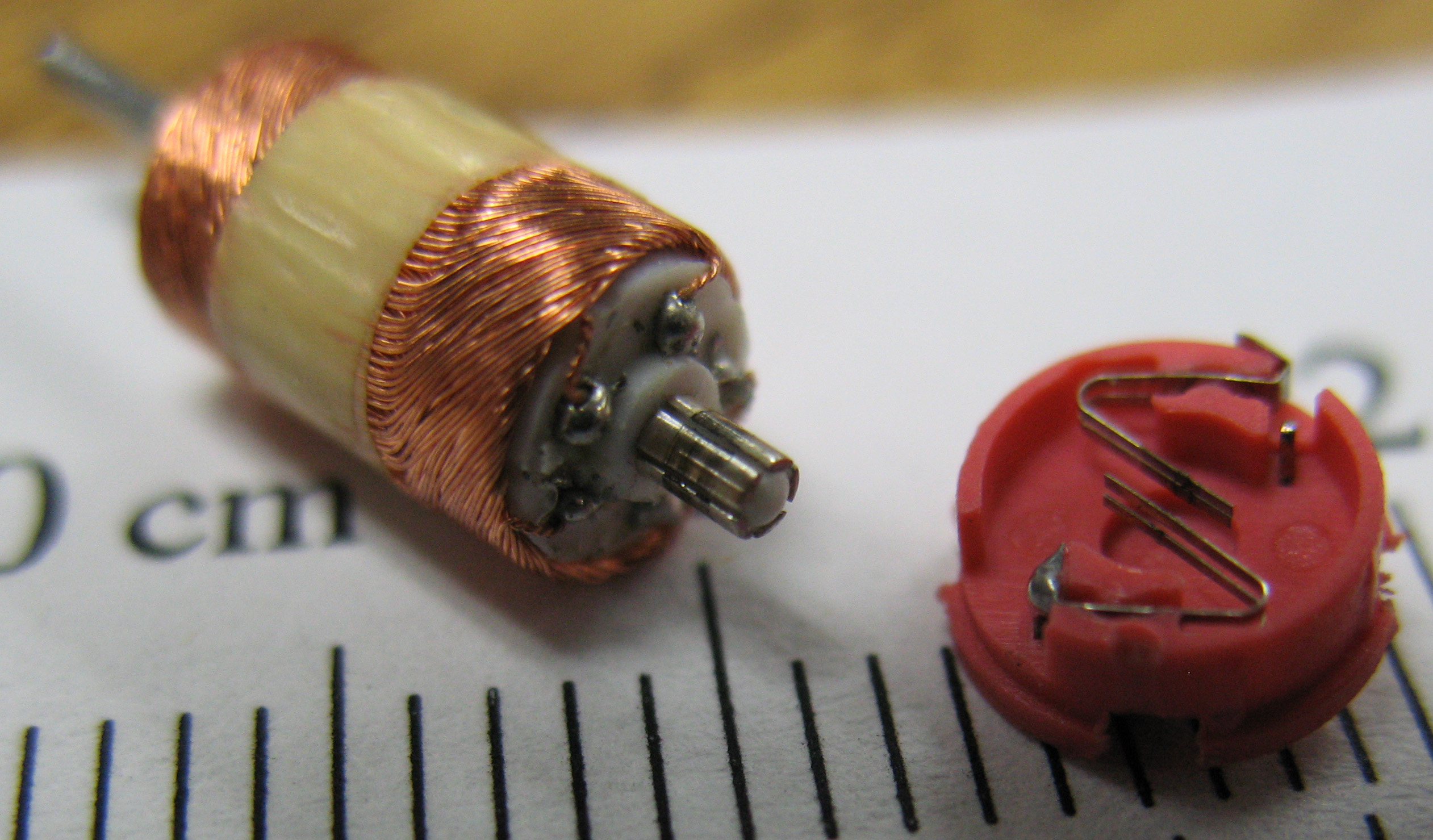
A tiny 5-segment commutator less than 2 mm in diameter, on a direct-current motor in a toy radio control ZipZaps car.

ZipZaps were unique among toy-style micro R/C vehicles in that they could be customized much like large R/C models. Each partially assembled ZipZaps kit included a pre-assembled chassis with built-in nickel metal hydride rechargeable batteries on which the gears, tires and hubcaps could be changed for better appearance and performance.

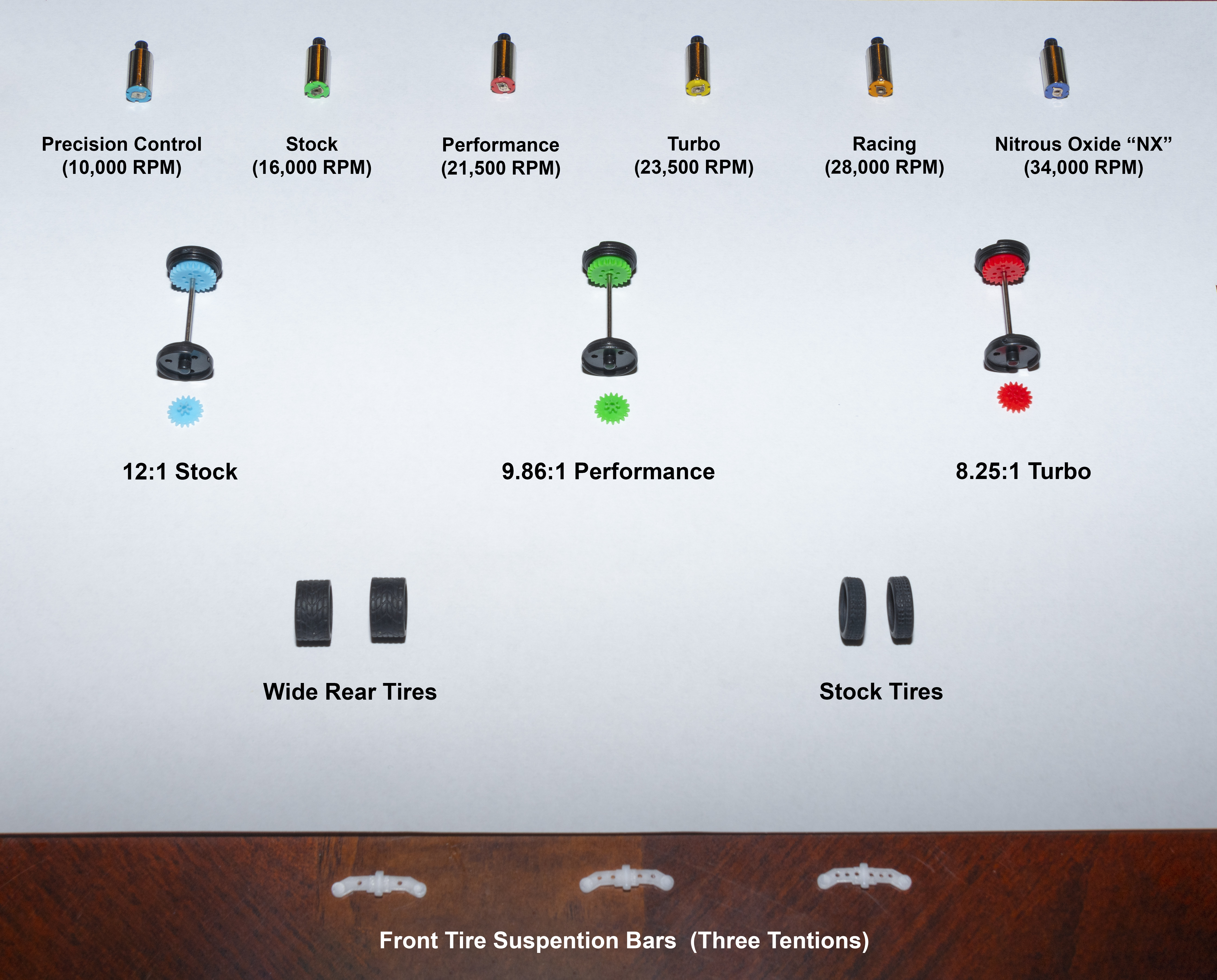
Zipzap upgrade accessories used to improve the RC cars performance.

Six motors and three gear ratios were offered, ranging from the 10,000 rpm "precision control motor" to the high-speed 34,000 rpm "NX" (named after a popular brand of nitrous oxide). Gear ratios were 12:1 "stock", 9.86:1 "performance" and 8.25:1 "turbo". Tracking was adjusted via a wheel alignment lever underneath the vehicles themselves. The vehicle's on-board battery was charged by snapping the entire car onto the top of the transmitter. Full charge was accomplished in about 40 to 60 seconds with run times averaging five minutes. Neither steering nor throttle was proportional, with both functions either full on or full off. The SE series added semi-proportional, two-speed throttle and fully proportional rack-and-pinion steering with steering trim adjustable at the transmitter, as with a full-sized R/C.

Further customizing options came from the variety of body shells which snapped on over the top of the chassis, allowing the car to take on the appearance of any number of popular cars including the Chevrolet Corvette, Toyota AE86, Audi TT, Ford GT, Ford Mustang, Hummer H1 and Mercedes-Benz SL. "Past and present" two-packs of body shells were sold as well, depicting early and late versions of sports cars and muscle cars. In addition to selling the Initial D manga, RadioShack also sold bodies for the SE chassis of the AE86 Trueno and the AE85 Levin from the series in a two-pack (which also included a few performance gears and motors) for the holiday season in 2002. Motion picture vehicles were represented by the Ford Gran Torino from Starsky & Hutch and the tuned imports from 2 Fast 2 Furious. RadioShack marketed a replica of Herbie that tied in with the Walt Disney Studios 2005 release of Herbie: Fully Loaded. In 2007, Radioshack released a set of ZipZaps for the live-action Transformers film, featuring Optimus Prime (the only model to feature a six-wheel chassis), Barricade, and Bumblebee. A series of monster trucks based on a larger chassis and with larger tires and motors and four wheel drive were available as well.

The original ZipZaps operated on one of two frequencies: namely 27 MHz and 49 MHz, so no more than two people can reliably race simultaneously. The SE series and monster trucks featured selectable frequencies within the 27 MHz band for up to six racers along with working headlights and taillights. The SE series had proportional control and used a pistol grip style remote control. Motors, tires and wheel covers (called "hubs") were interchangeable between regular ZipZaps and the SE series. The bodies were also interchangeable, but the lights on SE bodies obviously did not work on the regular chassis. Accessories such as lap counters, autocross pylons and carrying cases were available as well.

The popularity of ZipZaps waned somewhat in 2004 with RadioShack's introduction of XMODS. Like ZipZaps, XMODS offered customization options in both appearance and performance potential, but were considerably larger at 1:28 scale.

=== XMODS Micro RC ===
In October 2008, RadioShack relaunched the ZipZaps line – this time, as XMODS Micro RC. Only the name was changed; all parts were backwards and forwards-compatible between ZipZaps (except the light features of the SE line) and XMODS Micro RC lines, and used the same chassis and controller of the regular ZipZaps line (as opposed to the more advanced features of the SE line).
