= Saleen S281 =

Saleen S-281
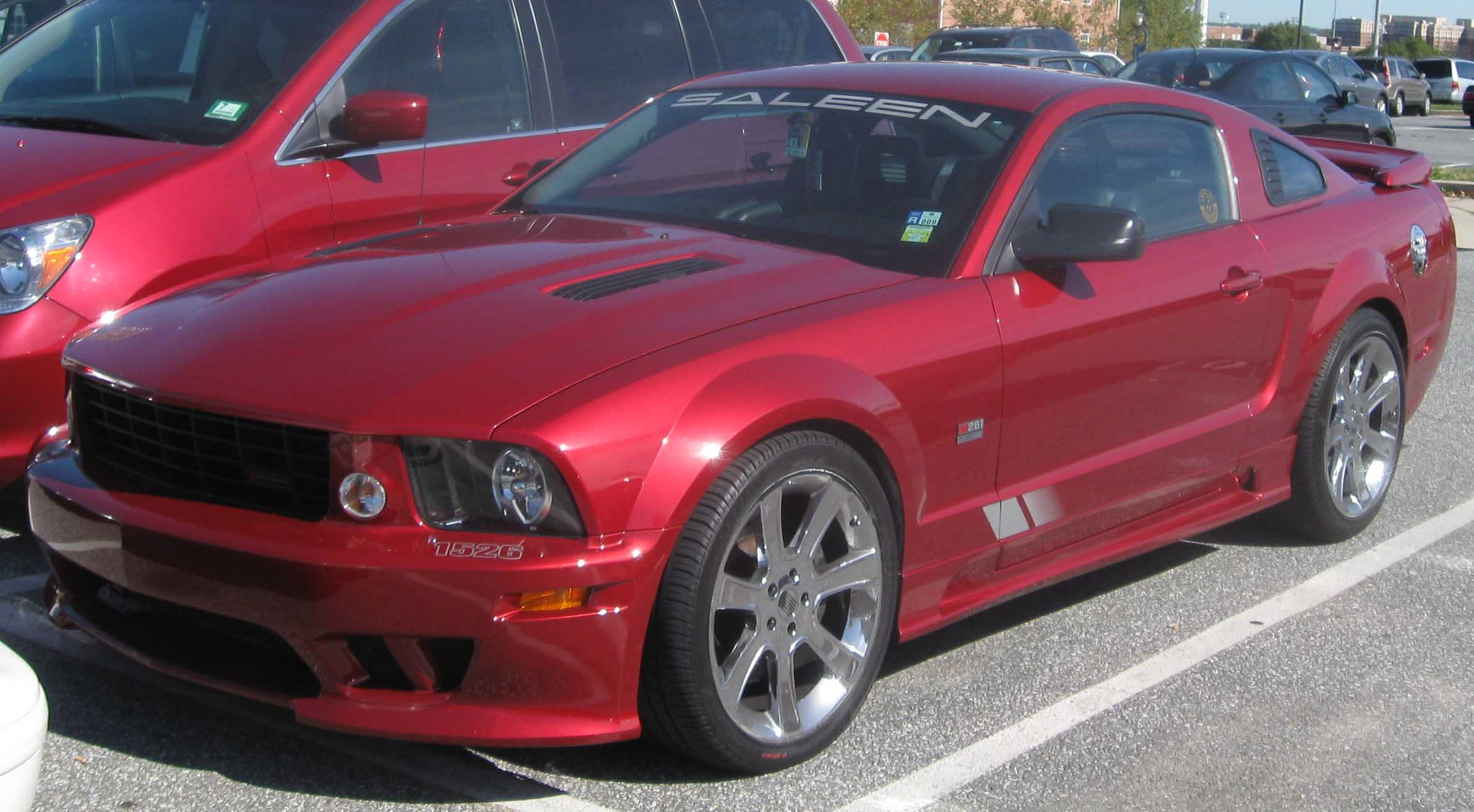

Overview
- Manufacturer: Saleen, Incorporated
- Production: 1996 - 2010
- Assembly: Irvine, California & Troy, Michigan
- Designer: Phil Frank

Body and chassis
- Class: Sports car Muscle car
- Body style: 2-door coupe 2-door convertible
- Layout: FR layout
- Related: Ford Mustang

Powertrain
- Engine: 4.6 L V8, 320 hp (240 kW) to 550 hp (410 kW)
- Transmission: 4 or 5-Speed automatic 5 or 6-Speed manual

Dimensions
- Wheelbase: 107.1 in (2,720 mm)
- Length: 189 in (4,801 mm)
- Width: 74 in (1,880 mm)
- Height: 56 in (1,422 mm)
- Curb weight: 3,550 lb (1,610 kg)

Chronology
- Predecessor: Saleen Mustang
- Successor: SMS 460/SMS 460X (2010)

The Saleen S281 is a variant introduced between the 4th and 5th generations of Ford Mustang which was produced by the American manufacturer Saleen, Inc. By 2005, Saleen departed from being a company of modifying existing Ford Mustangs as well as various other Ford automobiles, and became an Original equipment manufacturer. This was easily distinguishable with the bodywork designed by Phil Frank on the S-281's as well as the various other models offered by Saleen.

Previously referred to as Saleen Mustang, Saleen now introduced a model designation based on the Cubic Inch Displacement (CID) of the engine, now referring the car as Saleen 281 CID, or simply S-281. Any distinguishable options purchased by the customer is indicated with a suffix added after the 281, designating its difference.

== Variants ==
From its first introduction in 1996 until 2009, the S-281 has been introduced in several variations:

Several models were introduced:

- S-281/S-281 3V: Naturally aspirated Coupe/Convertible Model
- S-281SC: Supercharged Model
- S-281C: Saleen variation of the SVT Cobra first introduced in 1996.
- S-281E: Supercharged Extreme Model (supplied Saleen engine)
- S-281RF/S-281AF: Supercharged American Flag AF model sold to veterans. Supercharged Red Flag RF Model
- H-281 3V: Naturally aspirated 3-Valve Heritage Model
- H-281DG: Supercharged Heritage Dan Gurney Model
- Racecraft 420-S: Lighter, Sportier version of the S281 with minimal modifications, also known as the S-281SC Sport
- SA-15: 15th Anniversary Production Model (1998)
- SA-20: 20th Anniversary Production Model (2003)

=== S-281 ===
Making its debut in 1996, the Saleen 281 utilized a naturally aspirated stock 4.6L 2V SOHC V8 engine rated at 220 horsepower (164 kW). This model also received Racecraft brand suspension upgrades as well as an aerodynamic body kit installed. The S-281 model was commonly based on a Mustang 4.6L GT and became the flagship model for Saleen with the largest production of all Saleen vehicles until 2009. When the New Edge Mustang first appeared in 1999, the horsepower rating increased to 285 (213 kW) due to various engine improvements. With the introduction of the fifth-generation Ford Mustang, the designation was now recognized as S281-3V for the use of three valves per cylinder in the engine – now rated at 335 hp (250 kW).

=== S-281SC ===
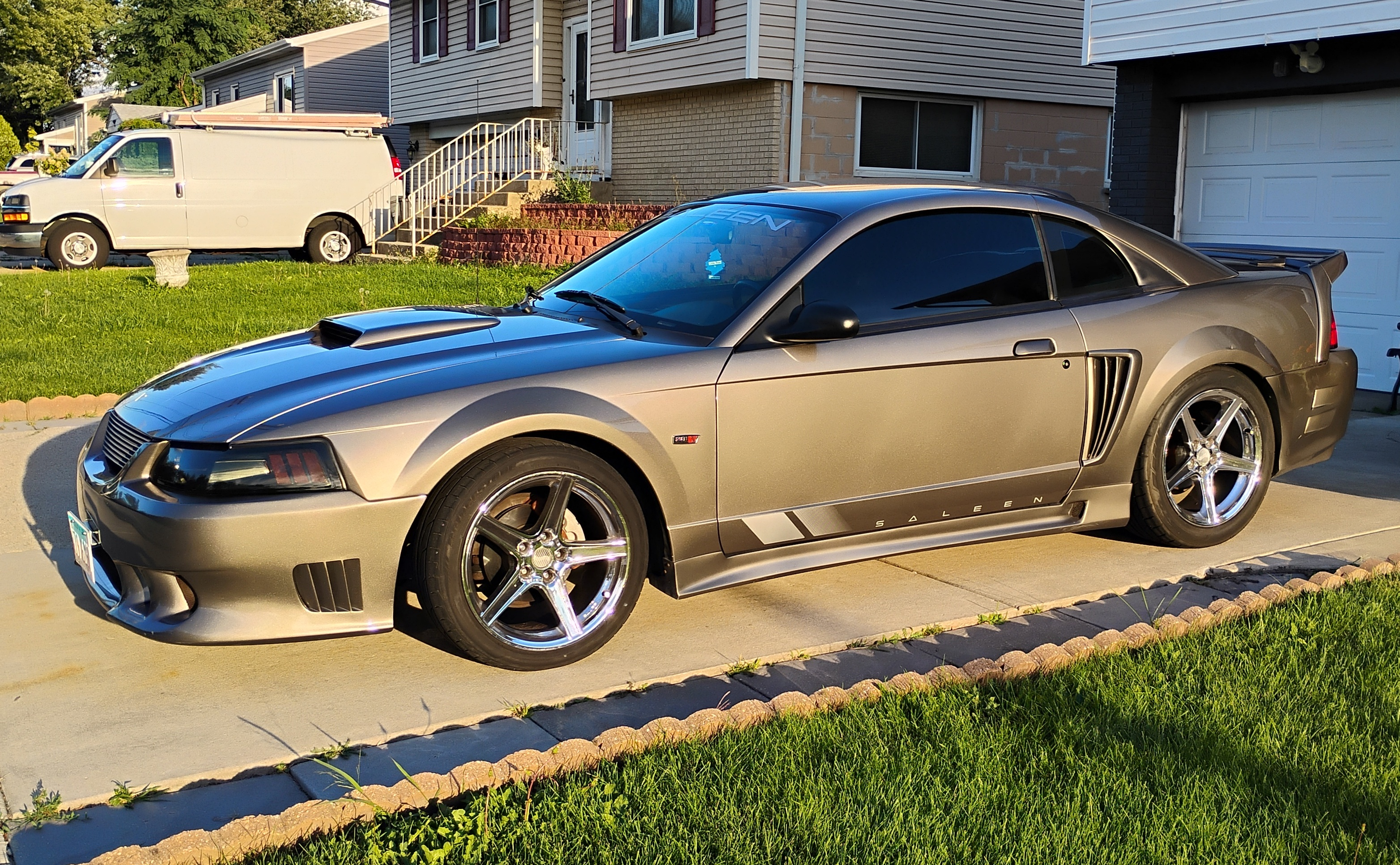
1999-2004 Saleen S281SC

The supercharged version of the S-281 was first introduced as an option for the New Edge Mustang in 1999, with a horsepower rating of 350 hp (261 kW). Designated as Saleen 281 CID SuperCharged, this designation was widely recognized as a separate model in 2000 with more options becoming available by Saleen. Notable internal differences of an S-281SC introduced a dual gauge instrument cluster above the dashboard, while the only external difference was a Saleen Heat Extractor hood. With the introduction of the Fifth-generation Ford Mustang, the supercharger was now installed in an upside-down configuration to provide better performance and a higher horsepower rating of 465 (347 kW).

=== S-281 Cobra ===
With the SVT Cobra now introduced with a 4.6L 4V DOHC V8 engine in 1996, Saleen introduced the Saleen 281 Cobra to customers to have purchase or receive their Cobra with Racecraft Suspension upgrades and the Saleen aerodynamic body kit, while the V8 engine itself was left unmodified (320 hp/239 kW). This option lasted until 2004, when the SVT Cobra was no longer in production. This designation continued to remain unmodified even with the introduction of the supercharged Cobras between 2003 and 2004.

=== S-281E ===
Making its debut in 2002, the Saleen 281 CID Extreme model now utilized a Saleen-built 4.6L 2V SOHC V8 Engine (Spark Ignition Configuration) which replaced the stock Ford 4.6L 2V SOHC V8 Engine. Notable external differences on the S-281E featured a rear fascia with center exhaust, an unintergrated large spoiler and replacement of the Ford Mustang fender logos with Saleen logos. With the new Fifth-generation Ford Mustangs introduced in 2005, a front splitter and rear diffuser were introduced below the front and rear fascias to improve vehicle aerodynamics. The 6-speed Tremec T-56 manual transmission used from the 2002-2009 era was originally in use for the short lived 2004-2006 Pontiac GTO.

=== S-281RF/S-281AF ===
Introduced in the fifth-generation era, both the Saleen 281 CID Red Flag and the Saleen 281 CID American Flag models were Supercharged, but offered at a lower price than an S-281SC. Notable detail parts such as the SC vented hood, SC rear wing, quarter window trim, and standard S281 seating are omitted. The RF is available in Black or Alloy with standard red decals while the AF is available in Torch Red, Vista Blue, and White with Red, White, Blue exterior decals. Both models are equipped with manual transmissions and chrome wheels.

=== H-281 3V ===
Introduced in June 2007 with a run of 100 vehicles, the Heritage 281 CID 3 Valve version was introduced. Sharing some bodywork features with the Parnelli Jones Limited Edition (S-302PJ), the H-281 3V was available in different colors. Key cosmetic differences from the Parnelli Jones Limited Edition include a smaller front air dam, omission of the chrome fascia trim, lack of a hood scoop, the addition of fender badges and a matte-black hood center. Production was limited, with 60 models being produced: 49 Coupes & 11 Convertibles. A total of 6 Grabber orange models were produced.

=== H-281DG ===
Introduced in 2008, the Heritage 281 CID Supercharged Dan Gurney model was based on Dan Gurney's 1969 Boss 302 Mustang Trans-Am racer. A run of 300 (100 Blue, 100 Red, 100 White) were built.

=== Racecraft 420-S ===
Making its debut in July 2008, the Racecraft 420 Horsepower Supercharged model was introduced as a demonstration to steer away from the Saleen name and to also offer Mustang fans a cheaper, yet sportier version of a supercharged Saleen. Using the infamous suspension name recognized on Saleens, the Racecraft 420-S was a lightly modified Ford 4.6L 3V SOHC with a Saleen Twin-Screw Supercharger. The success of this car and product name, Racecraft, failed to gather the attention the promoters hoped for with 89 units built as most true Saleen fans did not appreciate the infamous Saleen name to be replaced with another.

=== SA-15 ===
To celebrate the 15th Anniversary of Saleen in 1998, ten specially customized S281's were introduced. Officially designated as Saleen Anniversary of 15 Years, these ten vehicles were the first of the S281 series to be equipped with a Series 1 Eaton Blower Supercharger. These vehicles were exclusively offered through the Saleen Owners and Enthusiasts Club website and were only available as a Speedster/Convertible configuration.

=== SA-20 ===
To mark the 20th anniversary of Saleen in 2003, ten specially designed S-281SC's were built. Officially designated as Saleen Anniversary of 20 Years, these SA-20's now included a Saleen Series IV Screw Type Intercooled Supercharger and Saleen Powerflash performance calibration system. The most notable external difference on the SA-20's was the introduction of a new 20th Anniversary Cover with an integrated light-bar design, S-281E Spoiler Wing, and center exhaust. The SA-20 was introduced as a Speedster/Convertible only.

== See also ==
- Ford Mustang
- Shelby Mustang
