= Ford Mustang (fourth generation) =

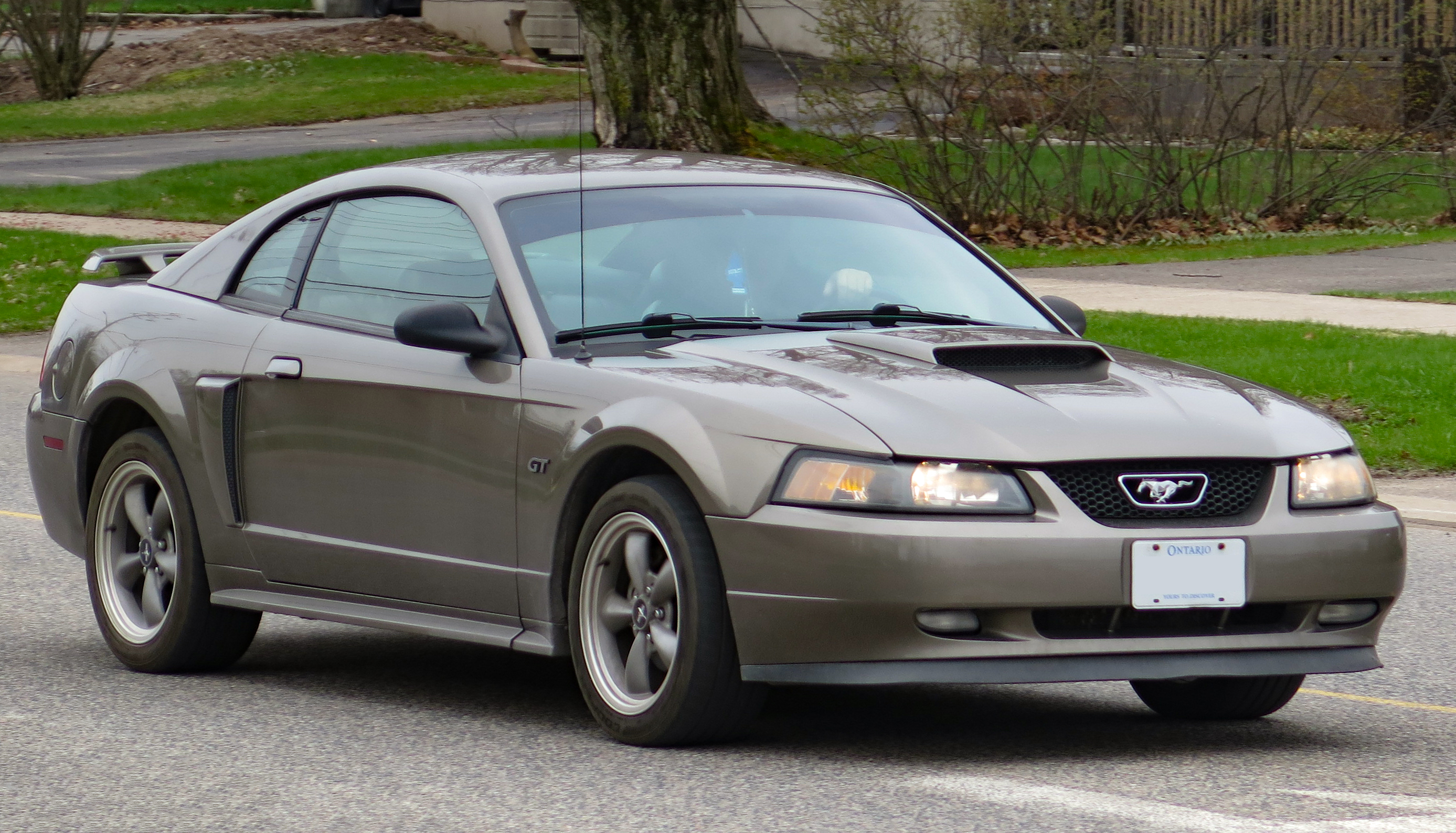
- 2003 Ford Mustang GT

Overview
- Manufacturer: Ford Motor Company
- Model code: SN-95
- Production: October 15, 1993 – May 10, 2004
- Model years: 1994–2004
- Assembly: United States: Dearborn, Michigan (Dearborn Assembly Plant)
- Designer: Bud Magaldi (exterior: 1990); Emeline King (interior: 1990); Doug Gaffka (facelift: 1996)

Body and chassis
- Class: Pony car
- Body style: 2-door convertible; 2-door fastback coupe
- Layout: Front-engine, rear-wheel drive
- Platform: Ford Fox-4

Powertrain
- Engine: 3.8 L (232 cu in) OHV Essex V6 (1994–2004); 3.9 L (237 cu in) OHV Essex V6 (2004); 5.0 V8 (302 cu in) OHV small block V8 (1994–1995 GT & Cobra); 5.8 L (351 cu in) OHV Windsor V8 (1995 Cobra R); 4.6 L (281 cu in) 2v SOHC Modular V8 (1996–2004 GT); 4.6 L (281 cu in) 4v DOHC Modular V8 (1996–2001 Cobra); 4.6 L (281 cu in) 4v DOHC SC Modular V8 (2003–2004 Cobra); 5.4 L (330 cu in) 4v DOHC Modular V8 (2000 Cobra R)
- Transmission: Borg-Warner T-5 five-speed manual (1994–2004 V6); Borg-Warner T-45 five-speed manual (1996–1999 Cobra and 1996–2001 GT); Tremec TR-3550 five-speed manual (1995 Cobra R); Tremec TR-3650 five-speed Manual (2001 Cobra & 2001–2004 GT); Tremec T-56 6-speed manual; Ford AODE four-speed automatic (1994–1995 V6 and GT); Ford 4R70W four-speed automatic (1996–2004 V6 and GT)

Dimensions
- Wheelbase: 101.3 in (2,573 mm)
- Length: 1994–1998: 181.5 in (4,610 mm); 1994–1998 Cobra: 182.5 in (4,636 mm); 1999–2004: 183.2 in (4,653 mm); 1999–2004 Cobra: 183.5 in (4,661 mm)
- Width: 1994–1998: 71.8 in (1,824 mm); 1999–2004: 73.1 in (1,857 mm)
- Height: 1994–1996 coupe: 52.9 in (1,344 mm) in; 1997–1998 coupe and Cobra convertible: 53.2 in (1,351 mm); GT coupe, 1997–1998 convertible: 53.4 in (1,356 mm) in; 1994–1996 GT convertible and Cobra: 53.3 in (1,354 mm); 1994–1996 convertible: 53 in (1,346 mm); 1999–2004 coupe: 53.1 in (1,349 mm); 1999–2004 convertible and Cobra: 53.2 in (1,351 mm); 1999–2001 Cobra convertible: 53.3 in (1,354 mm); Mach 1: 52.4 in (1,331 mm); 2002–2004 SVT Cobra coupe: 52.5 in (1,334 mm); 2002–2004 SVT Cobra convertible: 52.9 in (1,344 mm)

Chronology
- Predecessor: Ford Mustang (third generation)
- Successor: Ford Mustang (fifth generation)

The fourth-generation Ford Mustang is a pony car produced by the Ford Motor Company for the 1994 through 2004 model years. Marking the first major redesign of the Ford Mustang in fifteen years, the fourth generation of the pony car was introduced in November 1993 with the launch taking place on December 9, 1993. The design (which was code-named "SN95" by Ford), was based on an updated version of the Fox platform and was the final vehicle underpinned with this platform. It featured styling by Bud Magaldi that incorporated some stylistic elements from the classic Mustangs. A convertible model returned, but the previous notchback and hatchback bodystyles were discontinued in favor of a conventional 2-door coupe design.

Prior to the redesigned Mustang's launch, a two-seater show car was designed by Darrell Behmer and Bud Magaldi. Called the Mustang Mach III, it was shown at the 1993 North American International Auto Show in Detroit and hinted at what the new production Mustang would look like. The Mach III featured a supercharged 4.6 L DOHC V8 with a power output of 450 hp (336 kW; 456 PS). While this engine was not put into production, it hinted to the future use of Ford's Modular V8 in the Mustang, including the eventual use of a supercharged 4.6 L variant.

== Mustang (1994–1998) ==
The base Mustang featured Ford's 3.8 L OHV Essex V6 mated to a standard five-speed manual transmission or an optional AODE four-speed automatic transmission. The V6 produced 145 hp (108 kW; 147 PS) at 4,000 rpm and 215 lb⋅ft (292 N⋅m) of torque at 2,500 rpm. For 1996, the base V6 engine gained five horsepower with a new power train control module (PCM), the EEC-V. The AODE transmission was replaced with the 4R70W four-speed automatic transmission.

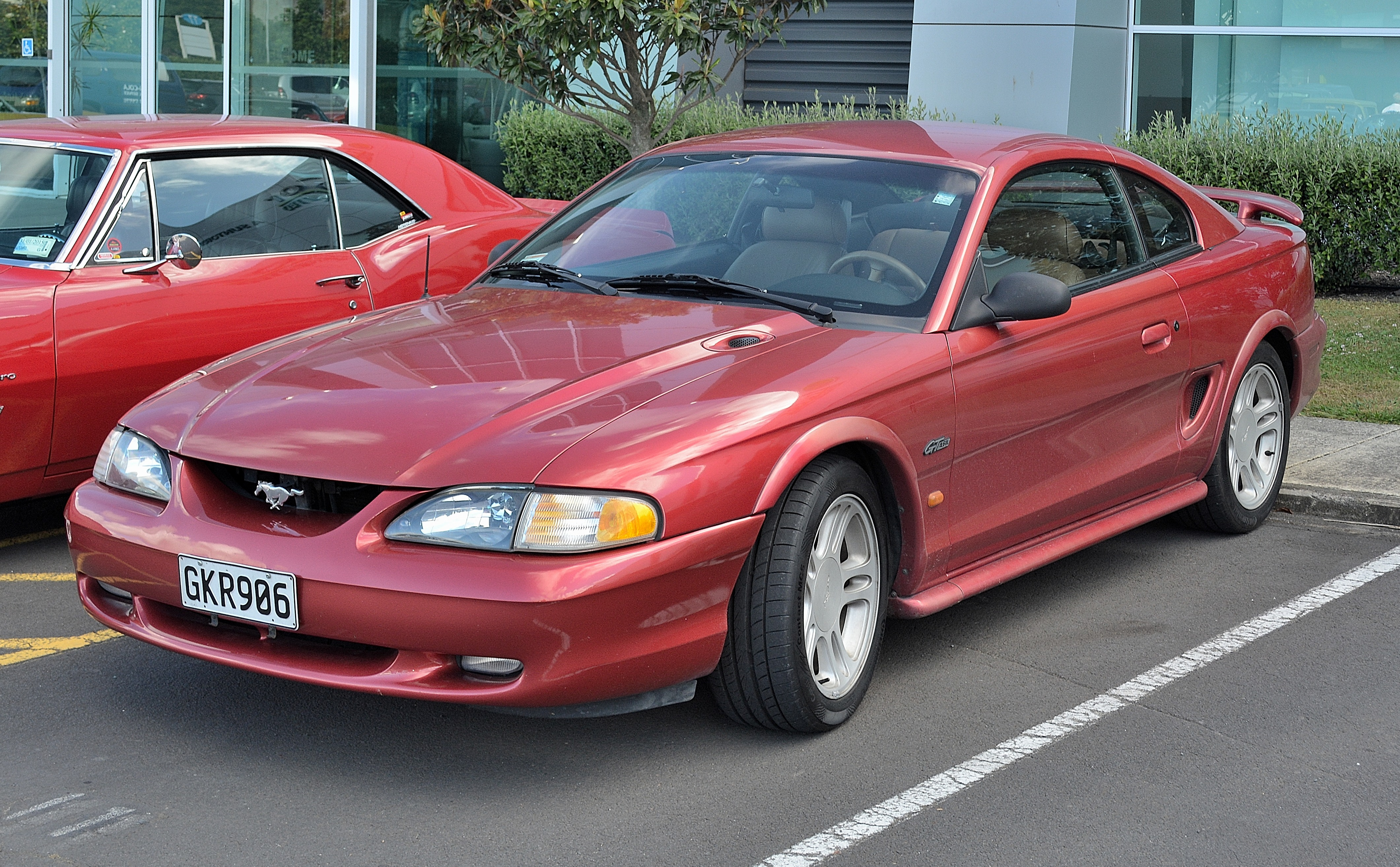

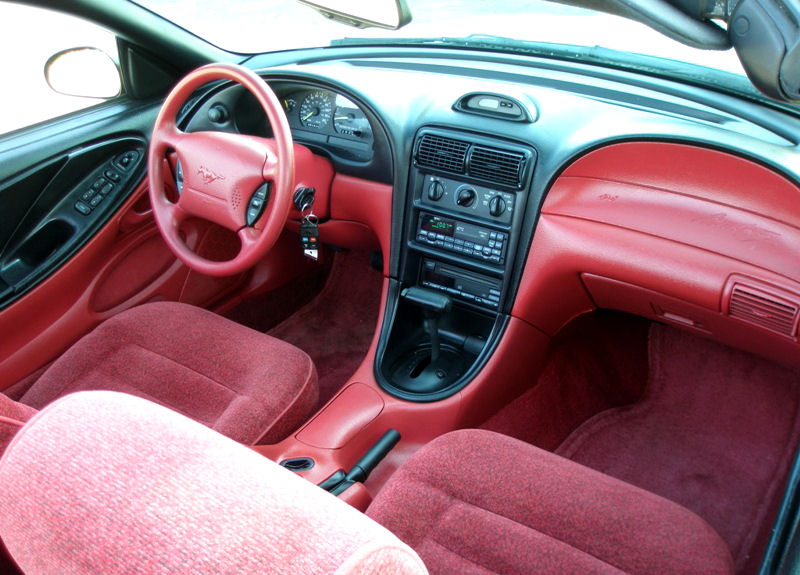
A 1996 Mustang coupe and the red interior of a V6-equipped model. Other interior colors—such as black and beige—were also available.

Ford allocated US$700 million to improve the Fox platform for the 1994 Mustang. Efforts were made to improve the car's handling as well as noise, vibration, and harshness (NVH) conditions over the previous generation Mustang. The Mustang's front suspension makes use of MacPherson struts with longer lower control arms, new spindles, anti-roll bars, and other enhancements over 1993 and older Mustangs. At the rear, a four-bar link solid axle was used. The 1994 Mustang's standard rear axle ratio was 2.73:1, though this was later changed to 3.27:1. All Mustangs received four-wheel disc brakes as standard, though anti-lock brakes (ABS) were optional.

Along with its new exterior, the 1994 Mustang received new interior styling. The Mustang's cabin featured a "dual-cockpit" layout that was adorned with contours and sweeping curves, similar to other Fords of the time such as the Thunderbird. The 1994 Mustang offered many options, some of which later became standard equipment. The preferred equipment package came with power windows, mirrors, and door locks, remote keyless entry, air conditioning, cruise control, and a trunk cargo net. Also available was Ford's Mach 460, 230-Watt multi-speaker sound system with CD player. The Mach 460 sound system utilized a proprietary audio configuration featuring 8-ohm woofers and dedicated factory amplifiers. All 1994 Mustangs had three-point seat belts and dual front airbags as standard. The taillight design for 1996 changed from three horizontal strips to three vertical sections more in line with classic Mustang tradition. Production of this iteration ran until October 1998.

=== Mustang GT ===
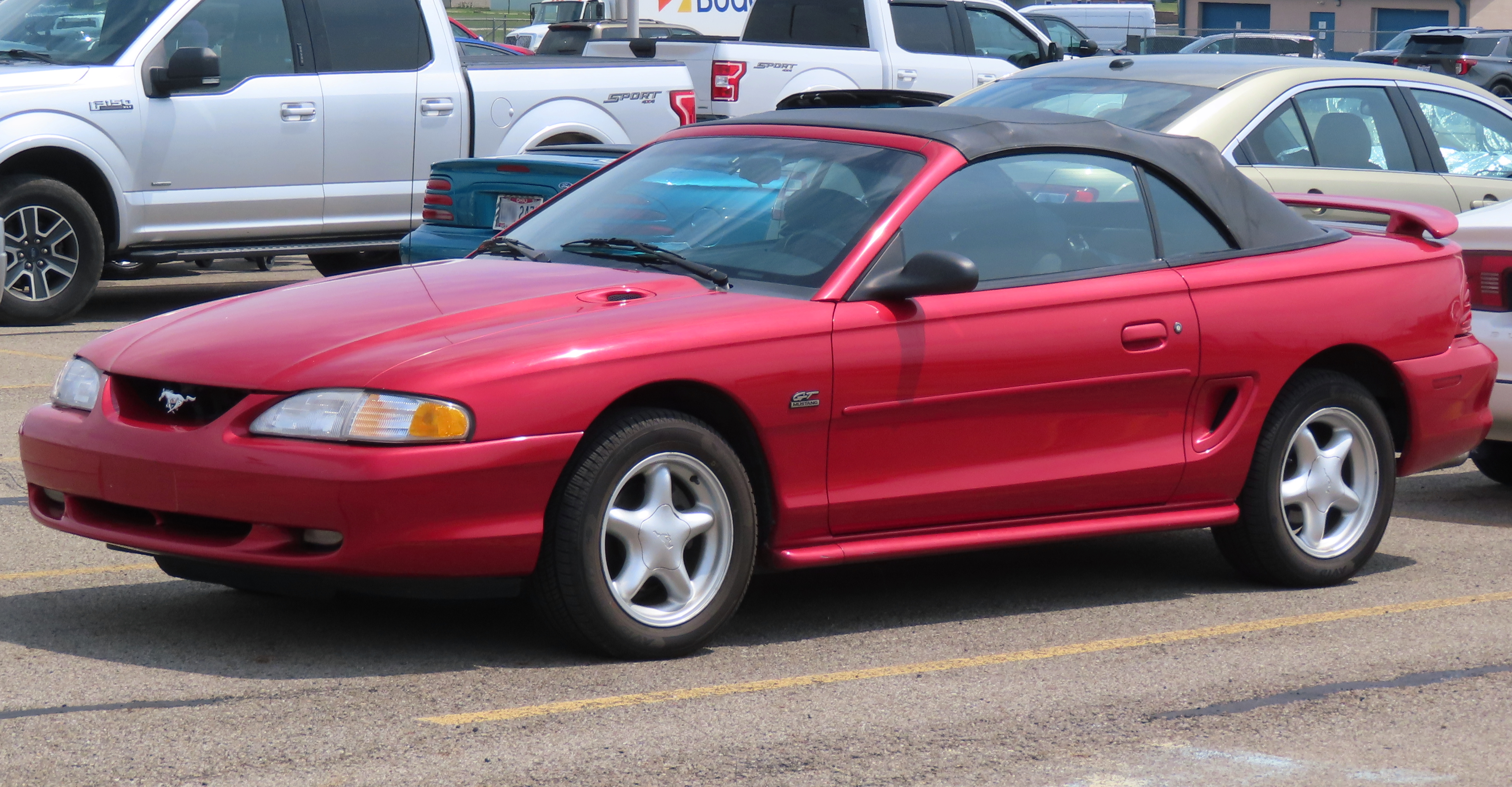
1994 Ford Mustang GT convertible

Following the base Mustang in December 1993, the Mustang GT was reintroduced in January 1994, featuring higher performance and better handling than the base Mustang or its 1993 predecessor. Ford carried over the 302 cuin pushrod small-block V8 engine from the 1993 Mustang GT. Total output from the engine was 215 hp (160 kW; 218 PS) at 4,200 rpm and 285 lb⋅ft (386 N⋅m) of torque at 3,400 rpm. Mustang GTs could accelerate from zero to 60 mph (97 km/h) in the high-six second range and complete the quarter-mile in about 15 seconds. The Mustang GT also featured a stiffer handling suspension, a 3.08:1 rear axle ratio (later changed to 3.27:1 or 3.55:1 depending on the transmission and model year), dual exhaust tips, and larger 16-inch (410 mm) wheels (compared to the base Mustang's 15-inch wheels). The 1994 Mustang GT was named Motor Trend Car of the Year.

For 1995, a one-year model referred to as the Mustang GTS was introduced. This was considered to be a "stripped down" version of the Mustang GT that included the performance parts of the GT model, but a minimum of non-performance related features, similar in concept to the 5.0 LX Fox-body. 1995 also marked the last year of the 5.0 pushrod V8 engine.

In 1996, Ford dropped the 302 CID small block V8 that was in production since 1968 and introduced the Modular 4.6 L SOHC V8. These engines were produced at two different plants, Windsor and Romeo. A "W" in the VIN's 8th digit indicates a "Romeo" engine, while an "X" indicates a "Windsor".

The Windsor and Romeo have subtle differences. The Romeo has fewer valve cover bolts than the Windsor, while the Windsor uses 8 mm front cover bolts and the Romeo uses 10 mm bolts. The Romeo uses jack screws on the main caps and the Windsor uses dowels. The new engine had a power output of 215 hp (160 kW; 218 PS) at 4,400 rpm and 285 lb⋅ft (386 N⋅m) of torque at 3,500 rpm, matching the output of its predecessor. For 1998, the 4.6 L V8 received a small increase in output, with it now increasing to 225 hp (168 kW; 228 PS) at 4,750 rpm and 290 lb⋅ft (393 N⋅m) of torque at 3,500 rpm. This was achieved through PCM calibration and a modified fuel system. Though capable of matching or exceeding the older 302 V8's output, the 4.6 L V8 was criticized for delivering inadequate performance, particularly against the larger displacement of the OHV V8 used in the Mustang's chief rival, the Chevrolet Camaro.

=== Mustang Cobra ===
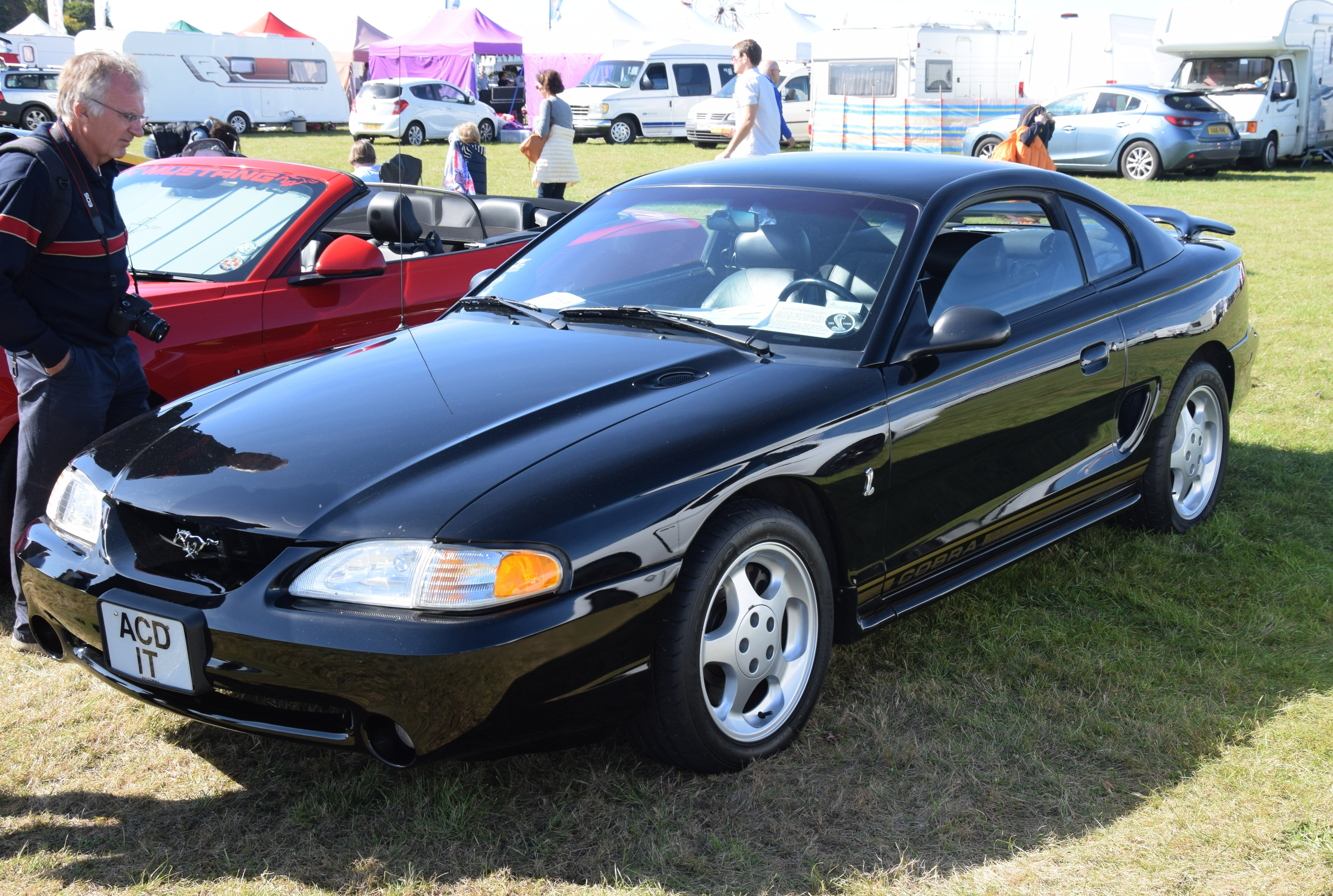
1995 Ford Mustang SVT Cobra

Building on the Mustang GT, Ford's Special Vehicle Team (SVT) developed an even higher performance car: the Mustang Cobra. For the 1994 and 1995 model years, the 5.0 L V8 was modified for the Cobra with unique intake manifolds, cams, fuel injectors, and heads. Suspension and brakes were also changed with 13-inch front discs with "COBRA" embossed calipers as well as Cobra specific shocks, struts, and springs. In 1996 it was available in a special color package called the Mystic Cobra which consisted of an expensive Chrom-a-lusion exterior finish like the Mysti-Chrome package on 2004 models. A total of 2,000 cars were produced. The 1996–1998 Cobras were powered by Ford's modular 4.6 L DOHC V8 like the Mustang GT which produced an advertised 305 hp (227 kW; 309 PS) and 300 lb⋅ft (407 N⋅m) of torque.

== The "New Edge" (1999–2004) ==
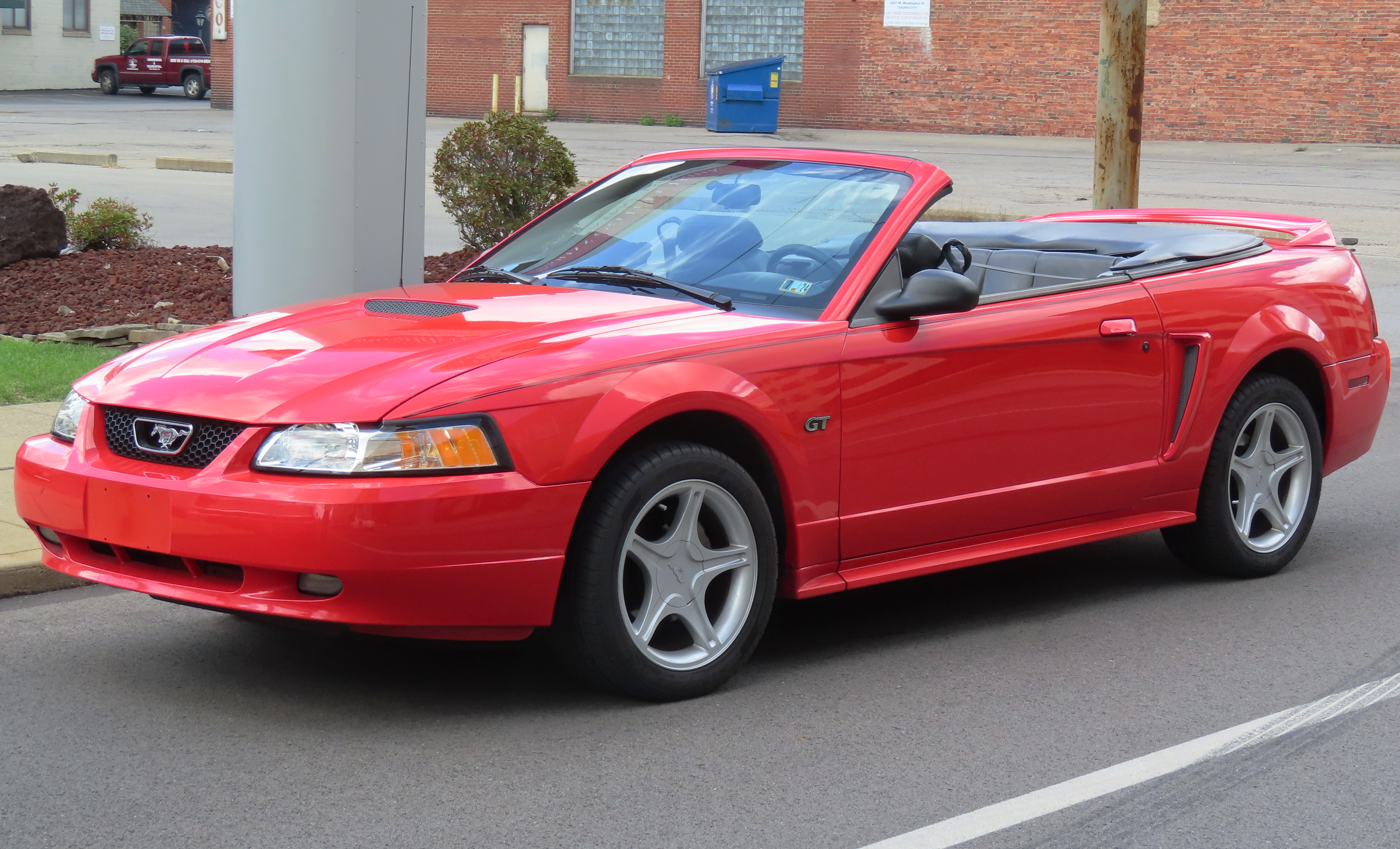
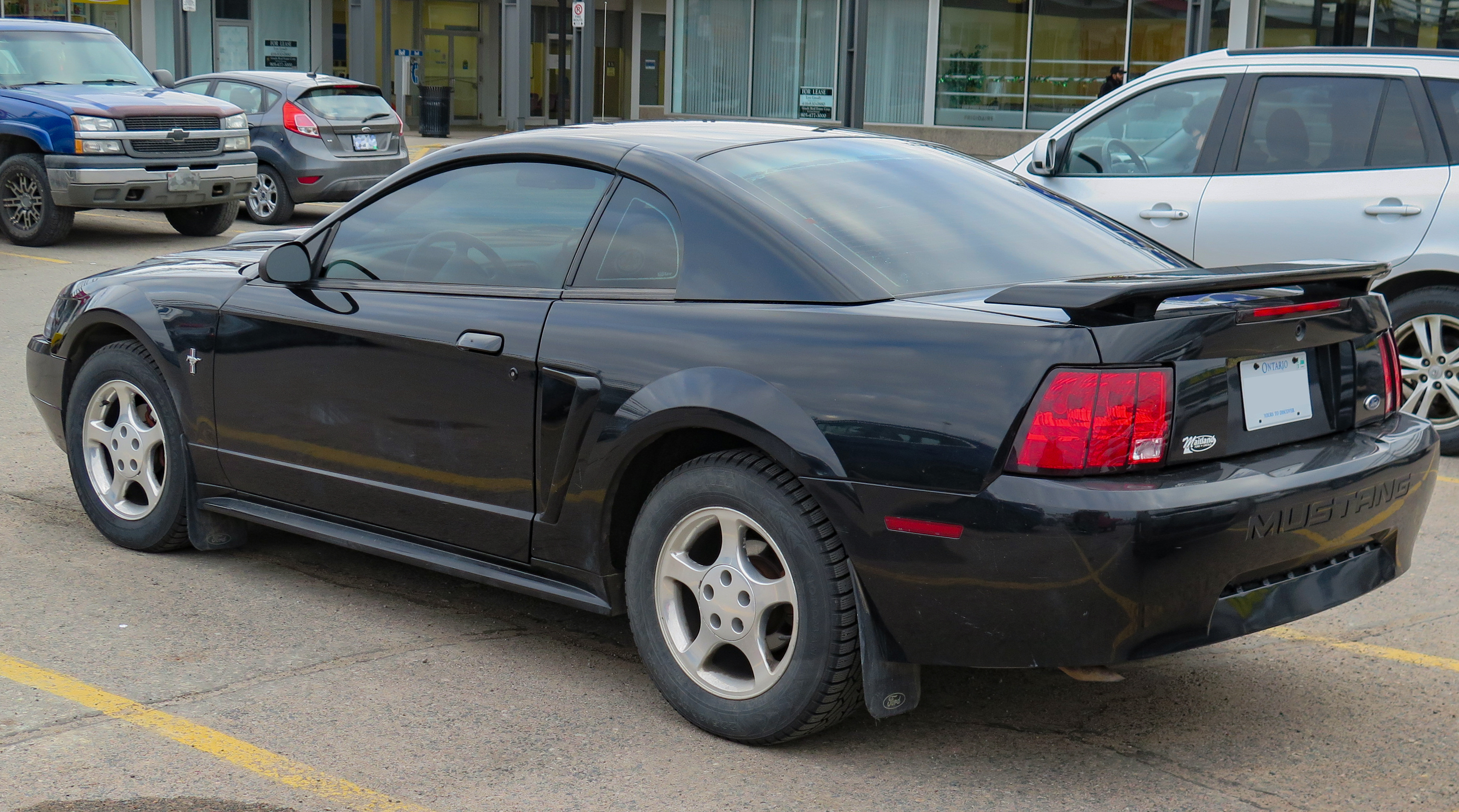
The updated New Edge styling for the 1999–2004 Ford Mustang showing the newly incorporated design elements; fltr: 2000 and 2003 models

The SN-95 Mustang received a facelift on December 26, 1998, for the 1999 model year with production starting in November 1998, informally known as the SN-99 Mustang platform/variant. Characterizing the redesign was Ford's New Edge design language, which featured sharper contours, larger wheel arches, and creases in the bodywork, replacing many of the soft lines of the previous model. The Mustang also received new wheels and hubcaps. However, the car carried over the same roofline and interior, in addition to the same basic platform. All 1999 Mustangs (except the Cobra) received "35th Anniversary" badges on the front fenders.

A "35th Anniversary Limited Edition" appearance option package was offered on 2,318 GT coupes and 2,310 GT convertibles. Available only in black, silver metallic, white, and red, they featured a body-colored hood scoop, rear spoiler, side scoops and rocker panels, a blacked-out panel between the taillamps, and 17 by 8-inch (200 mm) five-spoke aluminum wheels; while the interiors included black leather and vinyl seats with silver inserts and pony logo, aluminum shift knob, a unique instrument cluster with 35th anniversary script, silver and black floor mats with 35th anniversary logo, and silver door trim inserts.

The 3.8 L Essex V6 returned as the base engine for 1999. A new split-port induction system replaced single-port induction, which increased the base model's output to 190 hp (142 kW; 193 PS) at 5,250 rpm and 220 lb⋅ft (298 N⋅m) of torque at 2,750 rpm.

For 1999, the Mustang also received a change to its taillights, making them edgier, with sharp corners and straight lines as opposed to the rounded off style of previous years. The lamps were still composed of three vertical segments, reminiscent of the original Mustang. Minimal changes occurred from year-to-year, with the most noticeable being a redesigned center panel in the dashboard for 2001, which now allowed double-din stereo head units, including an in-dash six-CD player. The rear window defroster switch, previously mounted below the headlamp pull switch, was moved to the lower center stack below the stereo. When equipped, the fog lamp switch was relocated to the lower center stack as well, previously, it was on the center console adjacent to the cup holders. The third button on the lower switch panel was for the traction control system (on V8 models). On convertible models, the power roof switch remained on the center console — on coupe models, that switch was replaced with a small coin holder.

The GT model continued to use the 4.6 L V8 as before, but now power output was rated at 260 hp (194 kW; 264 PS) at 5,250 rpm and 302 lb⋅ft (409 N⋅m) of torque at 4,000 rpm.

In 2001, Ford added Intake Manifold Runner Control (IMRC) to the V6, increasing the engine's output to 193 hp (144 kW; 196 PS) at 5,500 rpm and 225 lb⋅ft (305 N⋅m) of torque at 2,800 rpm. During the second half of the 2004 model year, the 3.8 L Essex was replaced with a slightly revised 3.9 L version with a slightly longer stroke but a power output identical to the outgoing 3.8 L. The 3.9 L Essex was used in the Mustang for only half a year before being replaced by the 4.0 L Cologne V6 for the 2005 model year. The last Mustang for this generation was produced on May 10, 2004.

=== Mustang Cobra (1999, 2001, and 2003–2004) ===
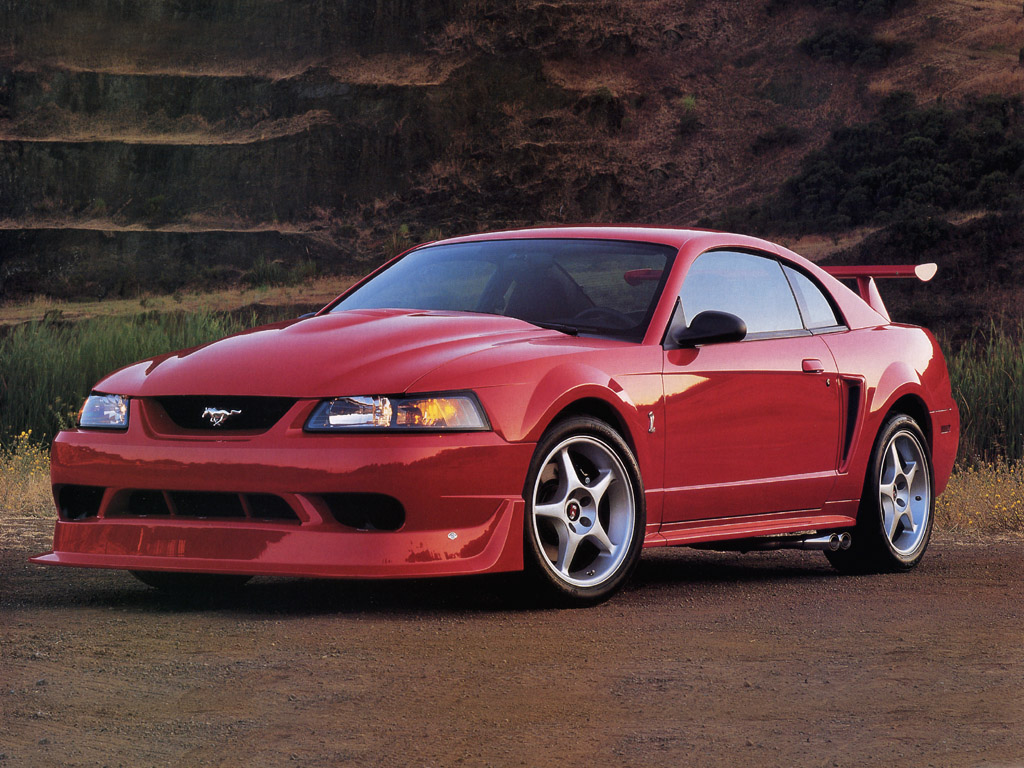
2000 Ford Mustang SVT Cobra R

The Cobra model returned for 1999 with its 32-valve 4.6 L V8, now rated at 320 hp (239 kW; 324 PS) at 6,000 rpm and 317 lb⋅ft (430 N⋅m) of torque at 4,750 rpm. It also featured independent rear suspension which changed the route of the exhaust pipes, forcing them to go under the axle which provided a unique look compared to the base and GT models.

In 2003 and 2004, the Cobra Terminator gained a supercharged engine rated at 390 hp (291 kW; 395 PS), with a more aggressive front and rear fascia, better-bolstered seats with angle adjustable headrests, and unique 18-inch wheels.

=== Special editions ===
In 2000, a unique trim level called the "Spring Feature Edition" was available on GT models. Offered only in Performance Red, Laser Red, Black, Silver, White, or Zinc Yellow, the Spring Feature package contained 17 in × 8 in (430 mm × 200 mm) performance wheels and tires, a body-colored hood scoop, body-colored side scoops, two black "GT" stripes on the hood, and black "Mustang" inserts on the embossed bumper. Ford produced 3,091 Spring Feature GTs.

In 2001, the Special Edition Bullitt was released to the public. Available only as coupe, the Bullitt was a mildly upgraded version of the standard GT. Factory upgrades included a lowered suspension (3/4 inch), subframe connectors (used on the convertible models), Tokico shocks, and brakes from the Cobra (13 in front, 11.7 in rear). The car also received an upgraded exhaust and a re-designed intake. These power upgrades led to a factory rating of 265 hp (198 kW), a gain of five horsepower over the standard GT. On the exterior, the car received unique Torq-Thrust style wheels, removal of the fog lights (for the US market; Canadian cars retained them) and rear deck spoiler, as well as new trim accents. It was available in three colors: Dark Highland Green, True Blue, and Black.

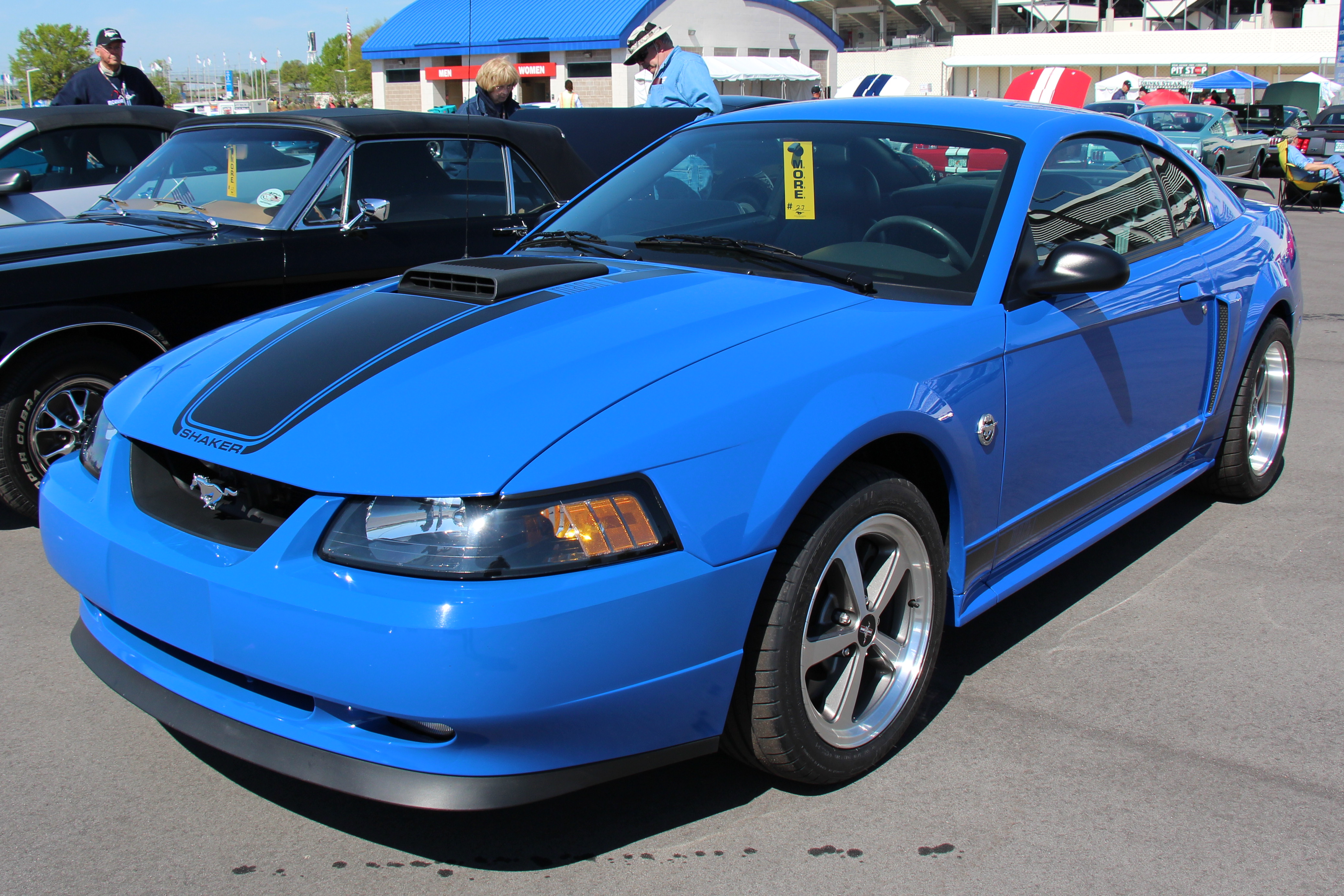
2003 Ford Mustang Mach 1

The success of the 2001 Bullitt led to the production of a second special edition, the 2003 to 2004 Mach 1. The Mach 1 was equipped with a 4.6 L DOHC 305 hp (227 kW) engine based on the engine available in the 1999 and 2001 Mustang Cobras, with new cylinder heads from the 2003 to 2004 Cobra (see above). The interior of the car was given a retro theme with seats made to look like the "comfort-weave" seats available in the 1960s-era Mach 1s. It also featured retro-themed gauges and a unique aluminum shifter ball. On the vehicle's exterior, a Mach 1 package was applied, consisting of a functional Shaker scoop, a unique 3-tier hood, decals set on the hood, rocker/door panels, a special chin spoiler, a flat black-rear-spoiler, Magnum 500 style wheels, and the C-Pillar covers used on the 1994–1998 Mustang. The car also received similar suspension upgrades as the Bullitt including unique Tokico struts on the rear and the convertible-spec subframe connectors.

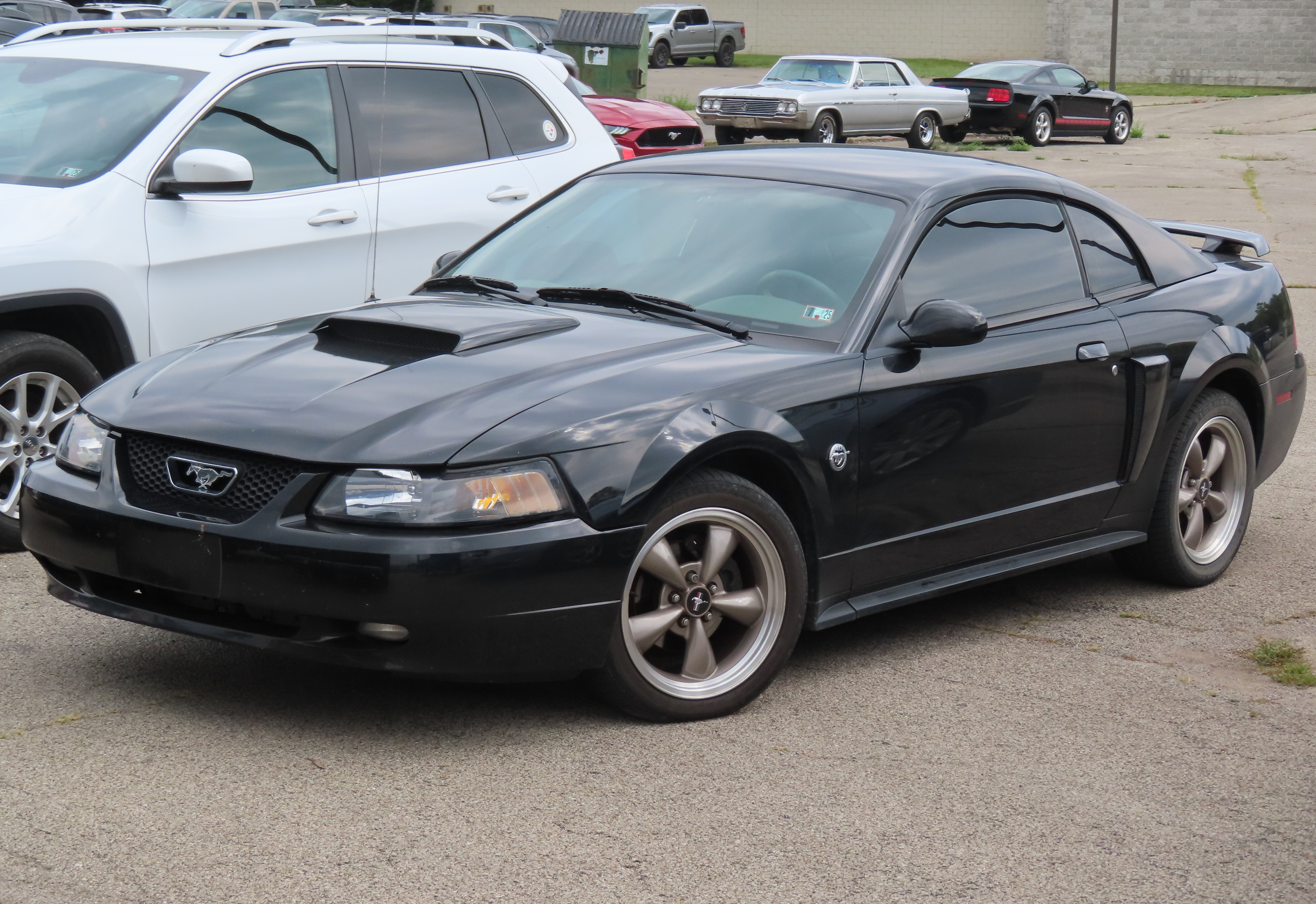
2004 Ford Mustang GT Deluxe with 40th Anniversary package

In 2004, Ford produced a special 40th Anniversary Edition of the Mustang. As an $895 option available in both Standard and GT editions, coupe or convertible, it consisted of 40th Anniversary badging, enhanced interior with "40th Anniversary" floor mats, painted folding exterior mirrors from the Cobra models, a tan cloth convertible top (instead of canvas), Arizona Beige painted "Bullitt" wheels, and Arizona Beige stripes on the hood, trunk and lower bodysides. The anniversary package was available in Crimson Red (exclusive to package), Oxford White or black. Ford produced 4,558 Crimson Red models. Crimson Red, Ford paint code "FX", was also called Merlot on several other Ford models from the 2002 through 2008 model years. Most 40th Anniversary package cars came with Parchment (tan) leather interiors. Some came with black leather. This is possibly a Canadian variation. This possible Canada-only variation also features 2003 Cobra wheels, no hood stripes and 'Mustang' decals on the lower-body side panels under the doors. Other than two pre-production units, all Crimson Red vehicles were built from August through November 2003. Forty-one of the Crimson Red cars were sent to Roush Industries for conversions into Roush Mustangs. It marked the end of this design of the Mustang, as 2005 ushered in an all-new model.

Ford celebrated its 100th anniversary in June 2003, and made limited edition F-Series Super Duty trucks, Explorers, Taurus, Focus, and Mustang GTs to commemorate the event. The 100th Anniversary models only came in black and included Premium Verona-grain Imola leather seating surfaces in two-tone parchment, and the Mustang got the GT premium package which included 17-inch wheels, anti-lock brakes and traction control; dual exhaust; power driver's seat with power lumbar support; leather-wrapped steering wheel; and Mach 1000 or Mach 460 AM/FM Stereo with six-disc CD changer, as well as Centennial badges on the fenders and decklid and embossed on the seats. The Centennial Package was a $995 upgrade.

=== Right-hand drive conversion ===
Ford Australia

This generation was sold in Australia for two years from 2001 to 2002 as to compete against the Holden Monaro (which eventually became the basis for the reborn Pontiac GTO). Due to the fact that the Mustang was never designed for right-hand-drive, Ford Australia contracted Tickford Vehicle Engineering to convert 250 Mustangs and modify them to meet Australian Design Rules per year. The development cost for redesigning the components and setting up the production process was A$4,000,000. Sales did not meet expectations, due in part to a very high selling price. In total, just 377 Mustangs were sold in Australia between 2001–2003.

For promotional purposes, Ford Racing Australia built a Mustang V10 convertible, which was powered by a Ford Modular 6.8-litre V10 engine from the American F-Series Super Duty truck but with an Australian-made supercharger.

== Engine output summary ==
Year	Base Model	GT	Cobra	Special Edition
1994	145 hp (108 kW; 147 PS) at 4,000 rpm 215 ft·lbf (291 N·m) of torque at 2,500 rpm	215 hp (160 kW; 218 PS) at 4,200 rpm 285 ft·lbf (386 N·m) of torque at 3,400 rpm	240 hp (179 kW; 243 PS) at 4,800 rpm	
1995	145 hp (108 kW; 147 PS) at 4,000 rpm 215 ft·lbf (291 N·m) of torque at 2,500 rpm	215 hp (160 kW; 218 PS) at 4,200 rpm 285 ft·lbf (386 N·m) of torque at 3,500 rpm	240 hp (179 kW; 243 PS)	300 hp (304 PS; 224 kW) (Cobra R)
1996	150 hp (112 kW) at 4,000 rpm 215 lb⋅ft (292 N⋅m) of torque at 2,500 rpm	215 hp (160 kW; 218 PS) at 4,400 rpm 285 lb⋅ft (386 N⋅m) of torque at 3,500 rpm	305 hp (227 kW; 309 PS) at 5,800 rpm 300 lb⋅ft (407 N⋅m) of torque at 4,800 rpm	
1997	150 hp (112 kW) at 4,000 rpm 215 lb⋅ft (292 N⋅m) of torque at 2,500 rpm	215 hp (160 kW; 218 PS) at 4,400 rpm 285 lb⋅ft (386 N⋅m) of torque at 3,500 rpm	305 hp (227 kW; 309 PS) at 5,800 rpm 300 lb⋅ft (407 N⋅m) of torque at 4,800 rpm	
1998	150 hp (112 kW) at 4,000 rpm 215 lb⋅ft (292 N⋅m) of torque at 2,500 rpm	225 hp (168 kW; 228 PS) at 4,750 rpm 290 lb⋅ft (393 N⋅m) of torque at 3,500 rpm	305 hp (227 kW; 309 PS) at 5,800 rpm 300 lb⋅ft (407 N⋅m) of torque at 4,800 rpm	
1999	190 hp (142 kW; 193 PS) at 5,250 rpm 220 lb⋅ft (298 N⋅m) of torque at 2,750 rpm	260 hp (194 kW; 264 PS)) at 5,250 rpm 302 lb⋅ft (409 N⋅m) of torque at 4,000 rpm	320 hp (239 kW; 324 PS) at 6,000 rpm 317 lb⋅ft (430 N⋅m) of torque at 4.750 rpm	
2000	190 hp (142 kW; 193 PS)) at 5,250 rpm 220 lb⋅ft (298 N⋅m) of torque at 2,750 rpm	260 hp (194 kW; 264 PS)) at 5,250 rpm 302 lb⋅ft (409 N⋅m) of torque at 4,000 rpm		385 hp (287 kW; 390 PS) (Cobra R)
2001	193 hp (144 kW; 196 PS)) at 5,500 rpm 225 lb⋅ft (305 N⋅m) of torque at 2,800 rpm	260 hp (194 kW; 264 PS) at 5,250 rpm 302 lb⋅ft (409 N⋅m) of torque at 4,000 rpm	320 hp (239 kW; 324 PS) at 6,000 rpm 317 lb⋅ft (430 N⋅m) of torque at 4,750 rpm	265 hp (198 kW; 269 PS) (Bullitt)
2002	193 hp (144 kW; 196 PS) at 5,500 rpm 225 lb⋅ft (305 N⋅m) of torque at 2,800 rpm	260 hp (194 kW; 264 PS) at 5,250 rpm 302 lb⋅ft (409 N⋅m) of torque at 4,000 rpm		
2003	193 hp (144 kW; 196 PS) at 5,500 rpm 225 lb⋅ft (305 N⋅m) of torque at 2,800 rpm	260 hp (194 kW; 264 PS) at 5,250 rpm 302 lb⋅ft (409 N⋅m) of torque at 4,000 rpm	390 hp (291 kW; 395 PS) S/C 390 lb⋅ft (529 N⋅m)) of torque	305 hp (227 kW; 309 PS) (Mach I)
2004	193 hp (144 kW; 196 PS) at 5,500 rpm 225 lb⋅ft (305 N⋅m) of torque at 2,800 rpm	260 hp (194 kW; 264 PS) at 5,250 rpm 302 lb⋅ft (409 N⋅m) of torque at 4,000 rpm	390 hp (291 kW; 395 PS) S/C 390 lb⋅ft (529 N⋅m) of torque	305 hp (227 kW; 309 PS) (Mach I)
