= Ford Fairlane (Americas) =

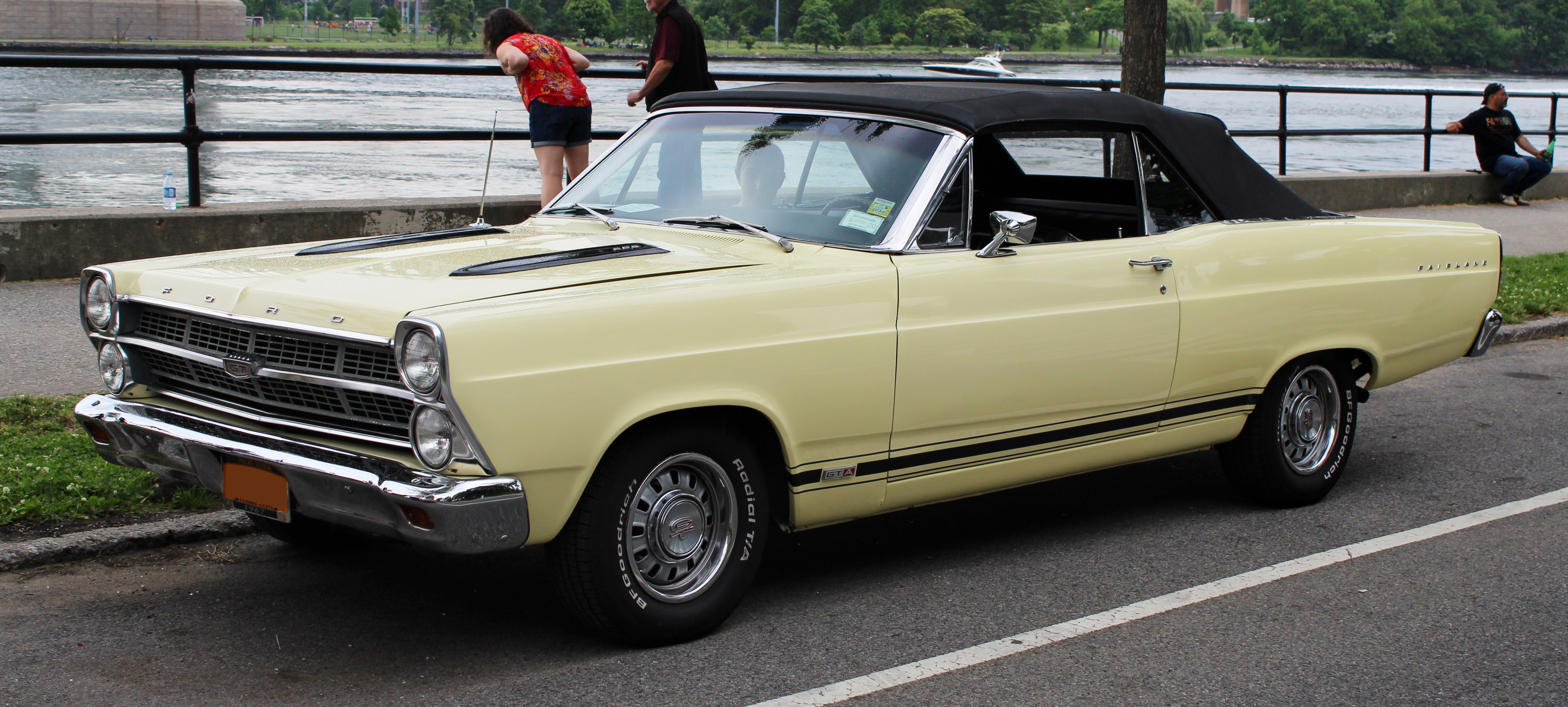
- 1967 Ford Fairlane

Overview
- Manufacturer: Ford
- Production: 1955–1970
- Assembly: Somerville, Massachusetts (⧉); Norfolk, Virginia (⧉); Memphis, Tennessee (⧉); Louisville, Kentucky (⧉); Long Beach, California (⧉); Dearborn, Michigan (⧉); Dallas, Texas (⧉); Chicago, Illinois (⧉); Mahwah, New Jersey (⧉); Claycomo, Missouri (⧉); San Jose, California (⧉); Metuchen, New Jersey (⧉); Lorain, Ohio (⧉); Milpitas, California (⧉); Atlanta, Georgia (⧉); Oakville, Ontario, Canada (⧉); Flemington, New South Wales, Australia (⧉); Lower Hutt, New Zealand (⧉); General Pacheco, Argentina (⧉)

Body and chassis
- Class: Full-size (1955–1961); Mid-size (1962–1970)
- Body style: two-door hardtop two-door convertible two-door sedan four-door sedan four-door hardtop four-door station wagon
- Layout: FR layout

Chronology
- Predecessor: Ford Crestline
- Successor: Ford Galaxie (full-size); Ford Torino (mid-size)

The Ford Fairlane is an automobile model that was sold between the 1955 and 1970 model years by Ford in North America. Taking its name from the Dearborn, Michigan estate of Henry Ford, the Fairlane nameplate was used for seven different generations of vehicles. Through its production, the model line would be marketed in a variety of body styles, including two-door and four-door sedans, two-door and four-door hardtops, station wagons, and both traditional and retractable-hardtop convertibles.

Initially introduced as the flagship of the full-size Ford range, the Fairlane marked the introduction of the Crown Victoria and 500 nameplates, both later becoming standalone full size model lines (the latter, as the Ford Five Hundred).

Following the introduction of the Ford Galaxie, the Fairlane 500 (and Fairlane) became Ford's base models, equivalent to the Chevrolet Bel Air and Biscayne respectively, until 1962, when it was repackaged as an intermediate-segment car (today, mid-size) from 1962 to 1970. For 1971, Ford expanded the Ford Torino nameplate across its entire intermediate range, dropping the Fairlane (and Falcon) nameplates in North America. In South America, the sixth generation Fairlane was marketed through 1981; Ford Australia used the nameplate on its own version of the Fairlane (a long-wheelbase Ford Falcon) through the 2007 model year.

== First generation (1955–1956) ==
First generation
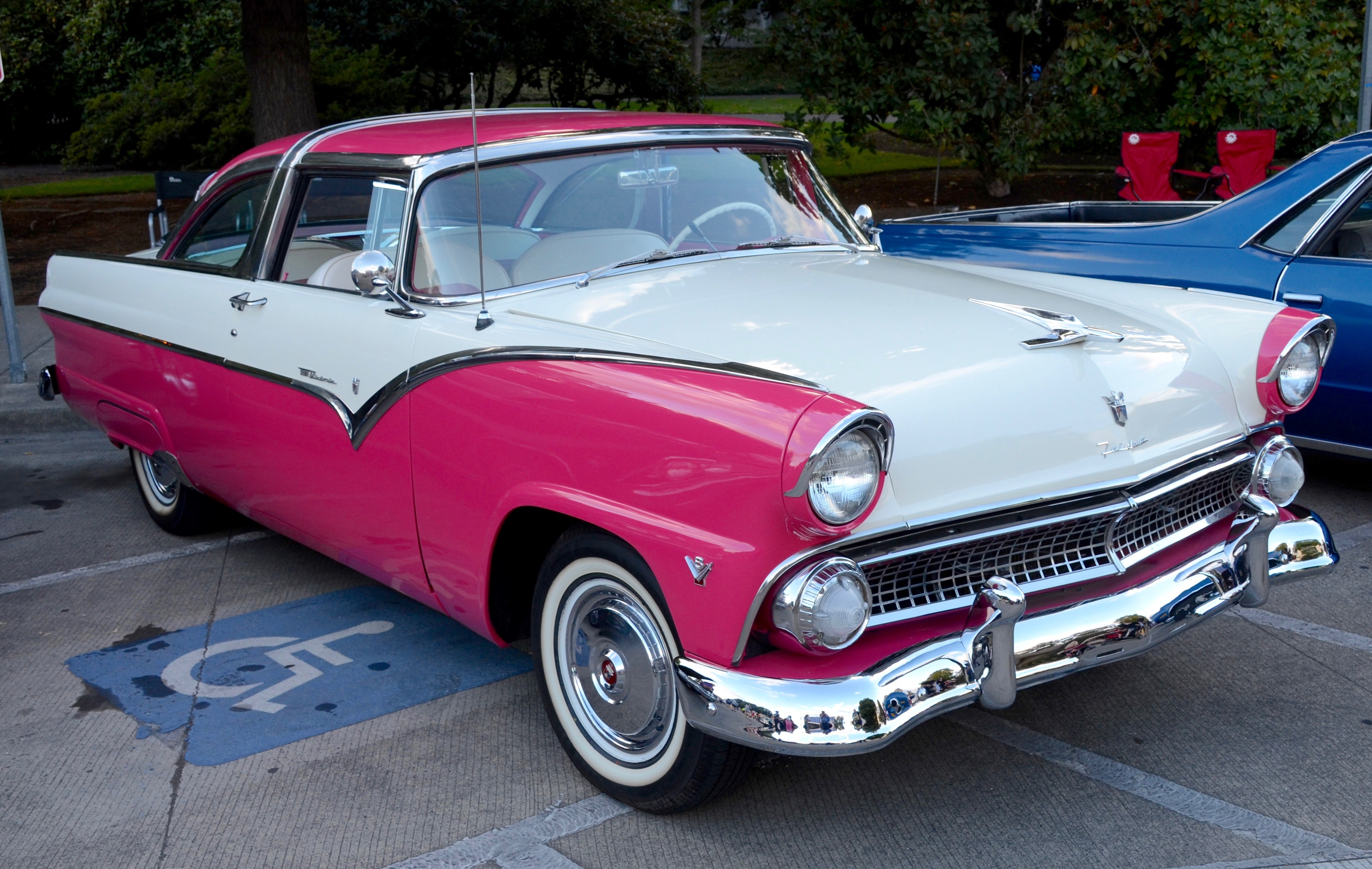
- 1955 Ford Fairlane Crown Victoria

Overview
- Production: 1955–1956

Body and chassis
- Body style: two-door hardtop four-door hardtop (1956) two-door convertible two-door sedan four-door sedan four-door station wagon
- Chassis: body-on-frame
- Related: Mercury Monterey; Ford Mainline; Ford Customline; Ford Ranch Wagon; Ford Country Sedan; Ford Country Squire; Ford Parklane; Ford Courier

Powertrain
- Engine: 223 cu in (3.7 L) I-Block I6; 272 cu in (4.5 L) Y-Block V8; 292 cu in (4.8 L) Thunderbird V8 (1956); 312 cu in (5.1 L) Thunderbird V8 (1956)
- Transmission: 3-speed manual 3-speed Fordomatic

Dimensions
- Wheelbase: 115.5 in (2,934 mm)
- Length: 198.5 in (5,042 mm)
- Width: 75.9 in (1,928 mm)
- Height: 61.0 in (1,549 mm)

For the 1955 model year the Fairlane name replaced the Crestline as Ford's premier full-sized offering. Six different body styles were offered, including the Crown Victoria Skyliner with a tinted, transparent plastic roof, the regular Crown Victoria coupe with much stainless steel trim, a convertible Sunliner, the Victoria hardtop coupe, and traditional sedans. All featured the trademark stainless-steel "Fairlane stripe" on the side. Power options were a 223 cu in (3.7 L) straight-6 engine and a 272 cu in (4.5 L) V8. The 292 cu in (4.8 L) Y-block was offered as an option and was called the Thunderbird V-8.

The Fairlane 4-door Town Sedan was the most popular sedan Ford sold that year, having manufactured 254,437 with a listed retail price of US$1,960 ($23,557 in 2025 dollars).

Few changes were made for 1956; a four-door Victoria hardtop and two new, more powerful V8 options, of 292 cu in (4.8 L) and 312 cu in (5.1 L), the latter available up to 225 bhp (168 kW; 228 PS), were introduced. The Lifeguard safety package was introduced. The two-door Victoria hardtop featured a new and slimmer roofline. A one-year only two-door station wagon, the 1956 Ford Parklane, featured Fairlane-level trim. It was marketed to compete against the Chevrolet Nomad.

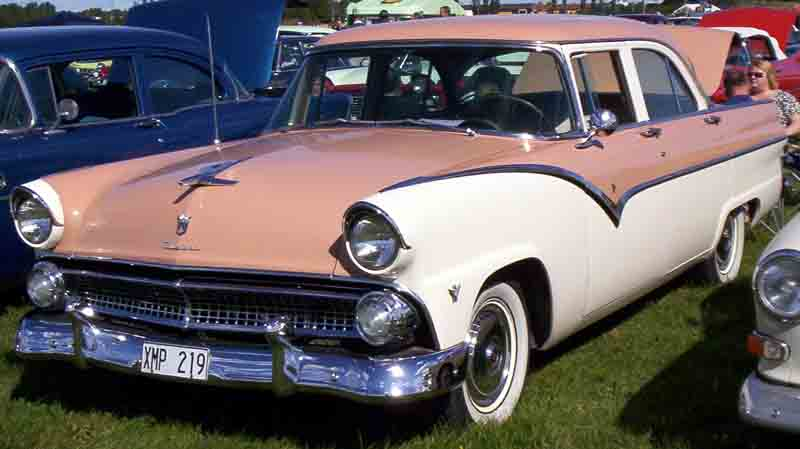
1955 Ford Fairlane Town Sedan

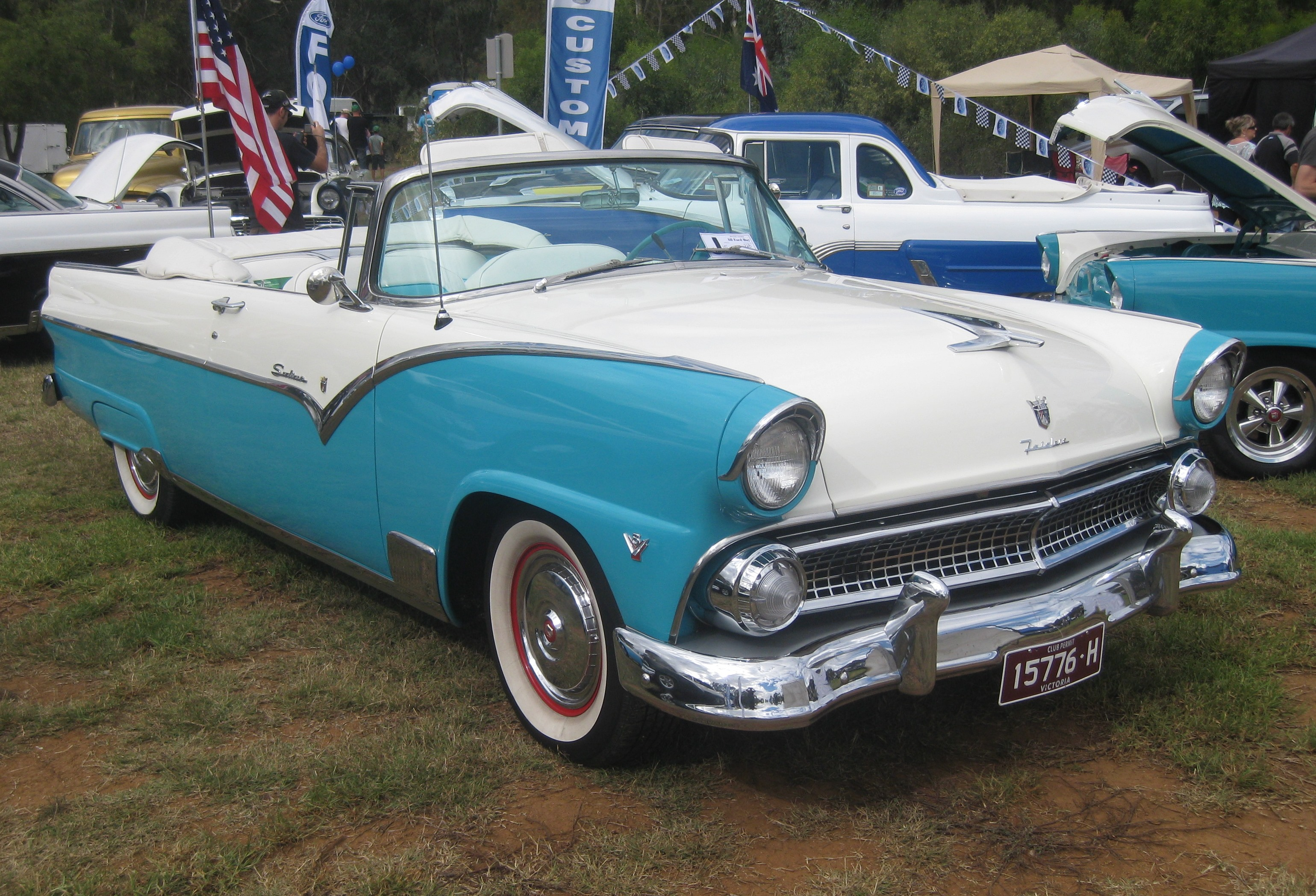
1955 Ford Fairlane Sunliner

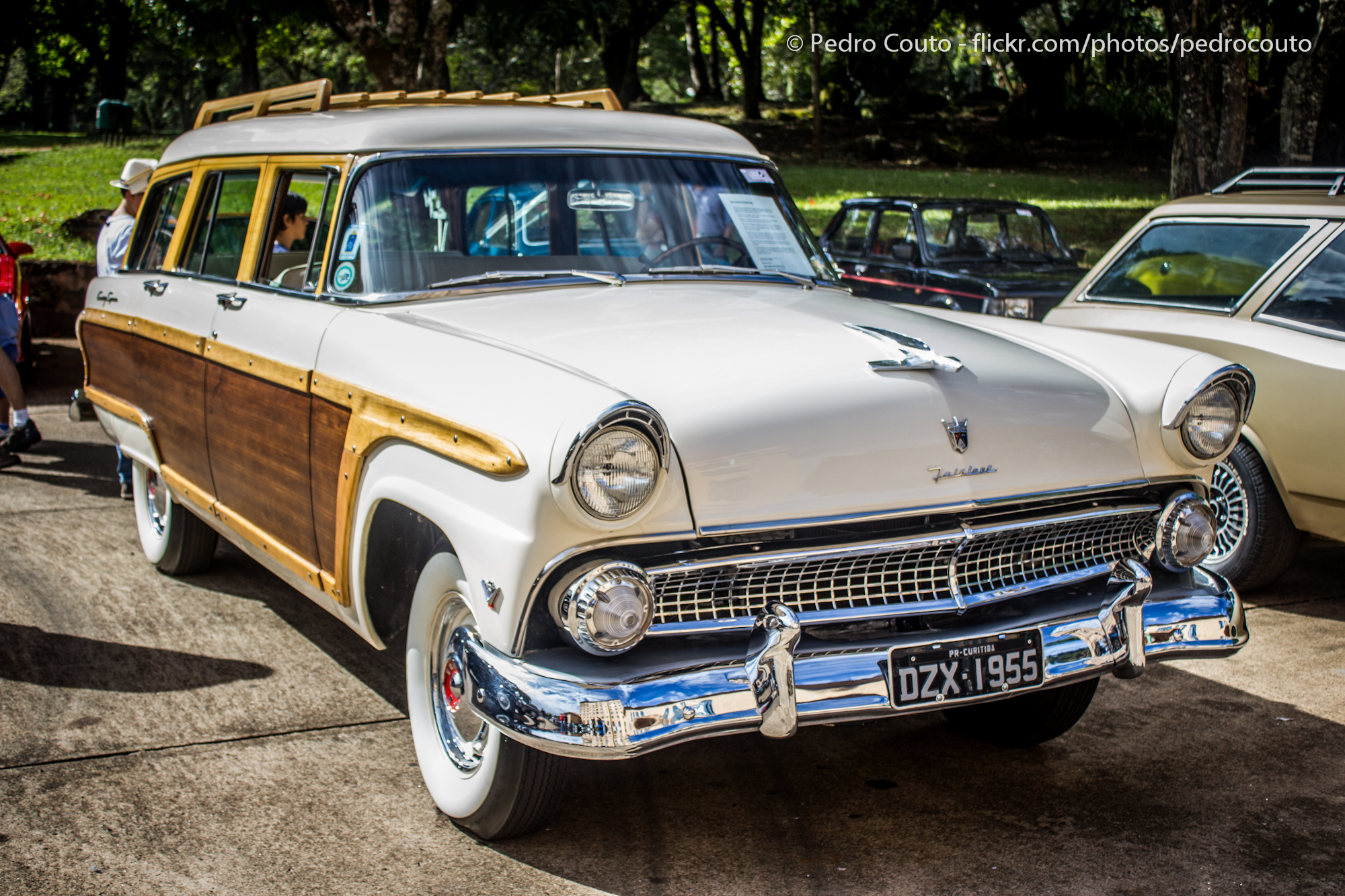
1955 Ford Fairlane Country Squire station wagon

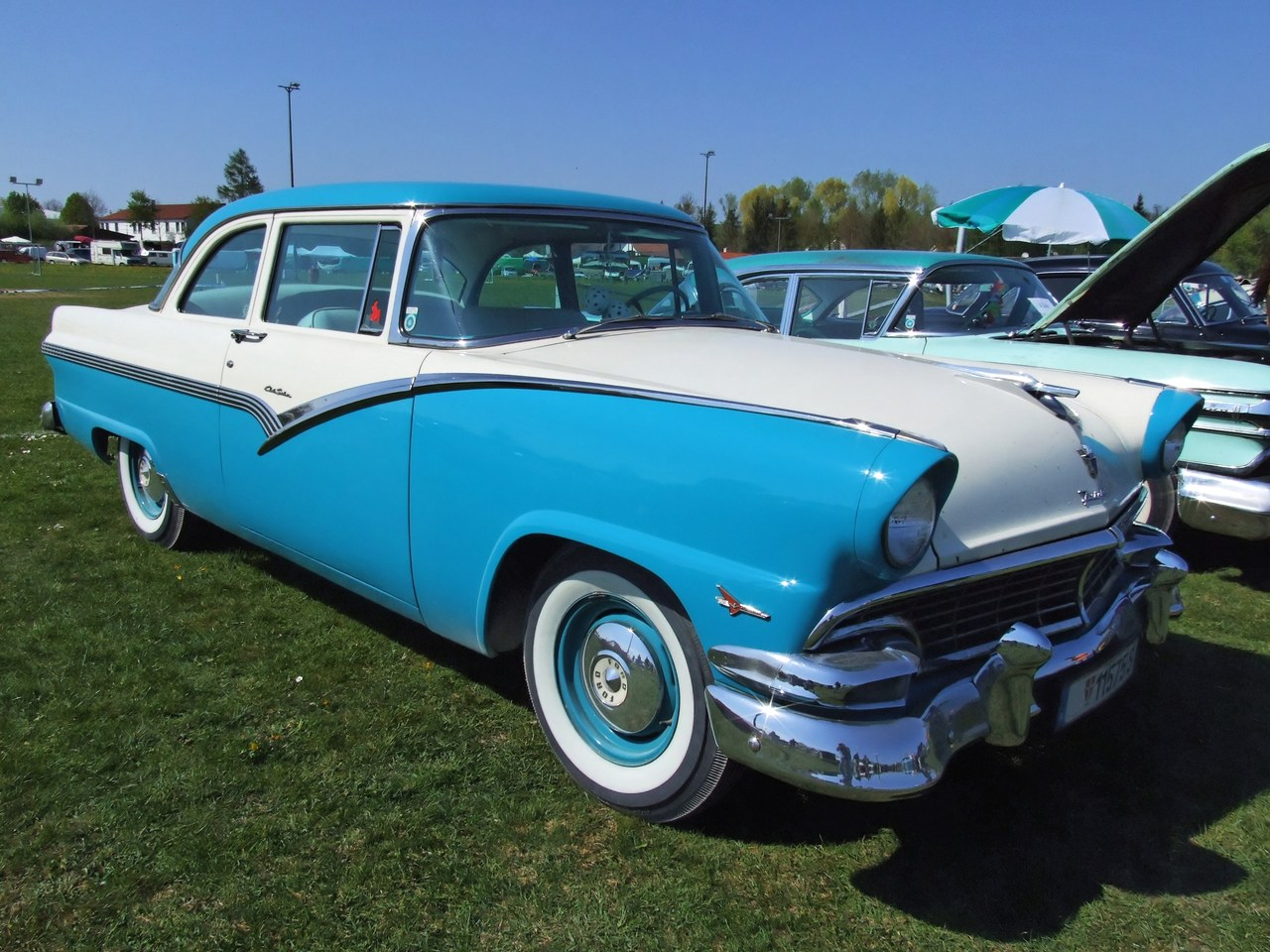
1956 Ford Fairlane Club Sedan

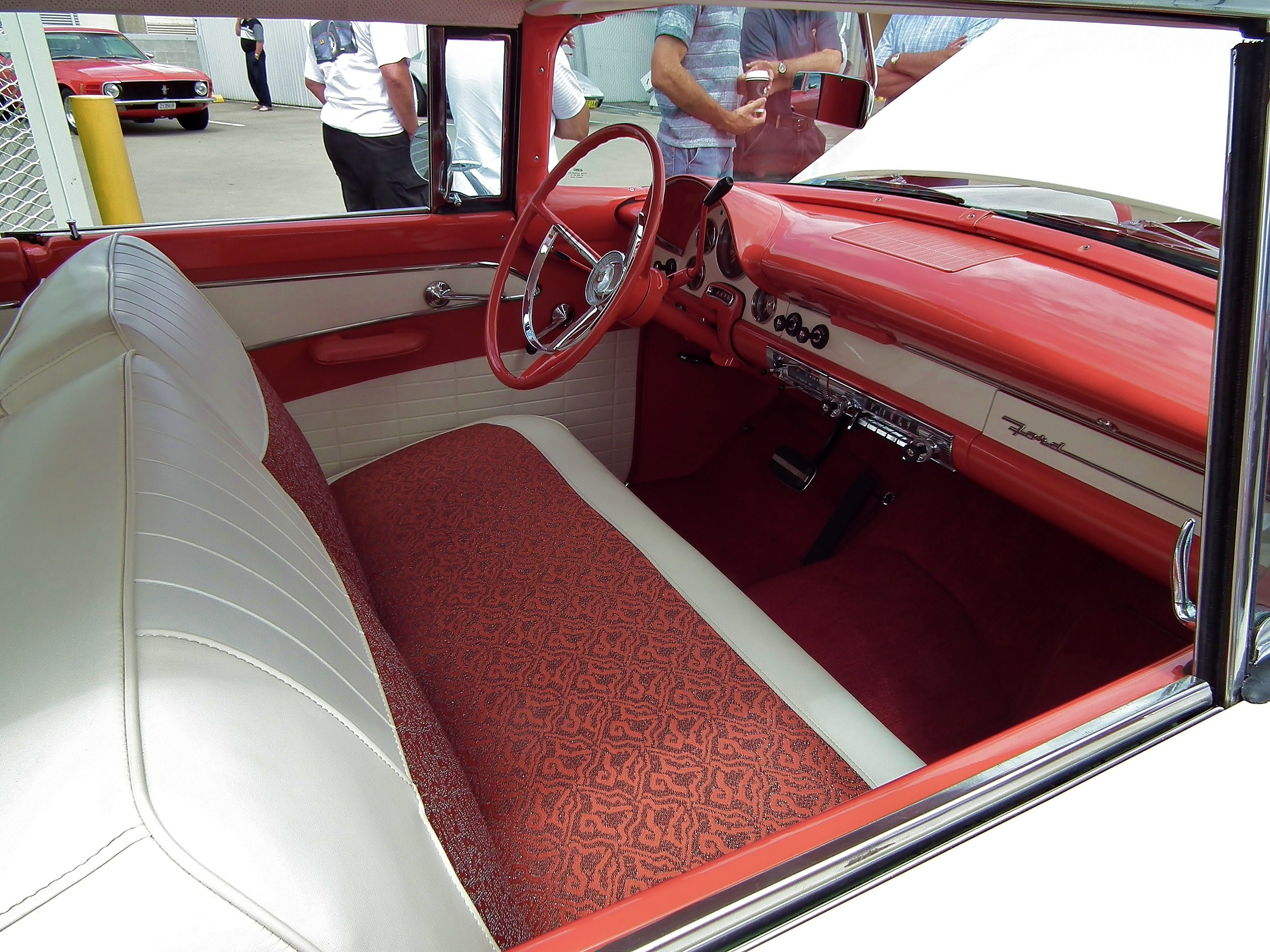
1956 Ford Fairlane Victoria coupe interior

== Second generation (1957–1959) ==
Second generation
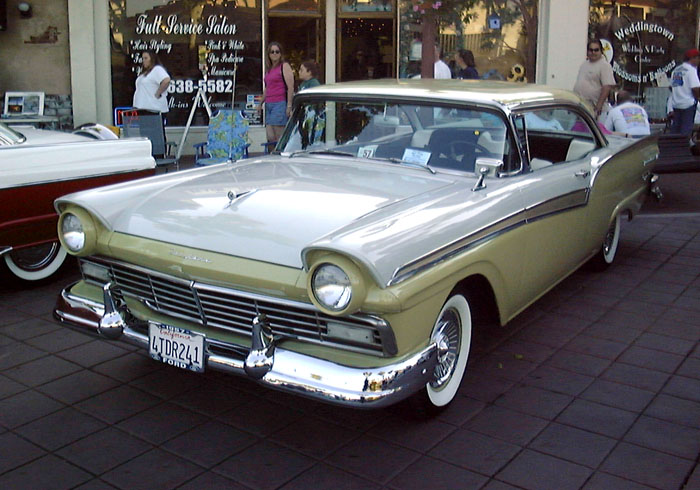
- 1957 Ford Fairlane 500 Victoria Club Coupe

Overview
- Production: 1957–1959

Body and chassis
- Body style: Two-door hardtop Two-door sedan Two-door convertible Two-door convertible Two-door retractable hardtop Four-door hardtop Four-door sedan Four-door station wagon Two-door coupe utility
- Chassis: body-on-frame

Powertrain
- Engine: 223 cu in (3.7 L) Mileage Maker I6; 292 cu in (4.8 L) Thunderbird V8; 312 cu in (5.1 L) Thunderbird V8 (1957); 332 cu in (5.4 L) Interceptor V8 (1958–1959); 352 cu in (5.8 L) Interceptor V8 (1958–1959)
- Transmission: 3-speed manual; 2-speed Fordomatic (1959); 3-speed Cruise-O-Matic (1958–1959); 3-speed Fordomatic (1957–1958)

Dimensions
- Wheelbase: 118 in (2,997 mm)
- Length: 201.7 in (5,123 mm)
- Width: 78.2 in (1,986 mm)
- Height: 58.9 in (1,496 mm)

For 1957, a new style gave a longer, wider, lower, and sleeker look with low tailfins. The new proportions and modern styling were a hit with customers to the extent that the Ford outsold Chevrolet in 1957 for the first time since 1935. A new top trim level, the Fairlane 500, was added to the Fairlane model line and the Country Squire continued to be the luxury station wagon while the Country Sedan was now added to the Fairlane model line, while engine choices were largely the same as the year before. The big news for 1957 was the introduction of the Fairlane 500 Skyliner power retractable hardtop, whose solid top hinged and folded down into the trunk space at the touch of a button, while the Ford Ranchero two-door coupe utility was also introduced.

Another facelift for 1958 had fashionable quad headlights, a grille that matched the 1958 Thunderbird, and other styling changes. New big-block FE V8s of 332 and 352 CID (5.4 L and 5.8 L) replaced the previous largest V8s, and a better three-speed automatic transmission was also available with a steering column transmission gear selector lever.

A new top-level full-sized model was introduced at mid-year 1959, the Ford Galaxie. The 1959 Galaxie displayed both "Fairlane 500" and "Galaxie" badging.

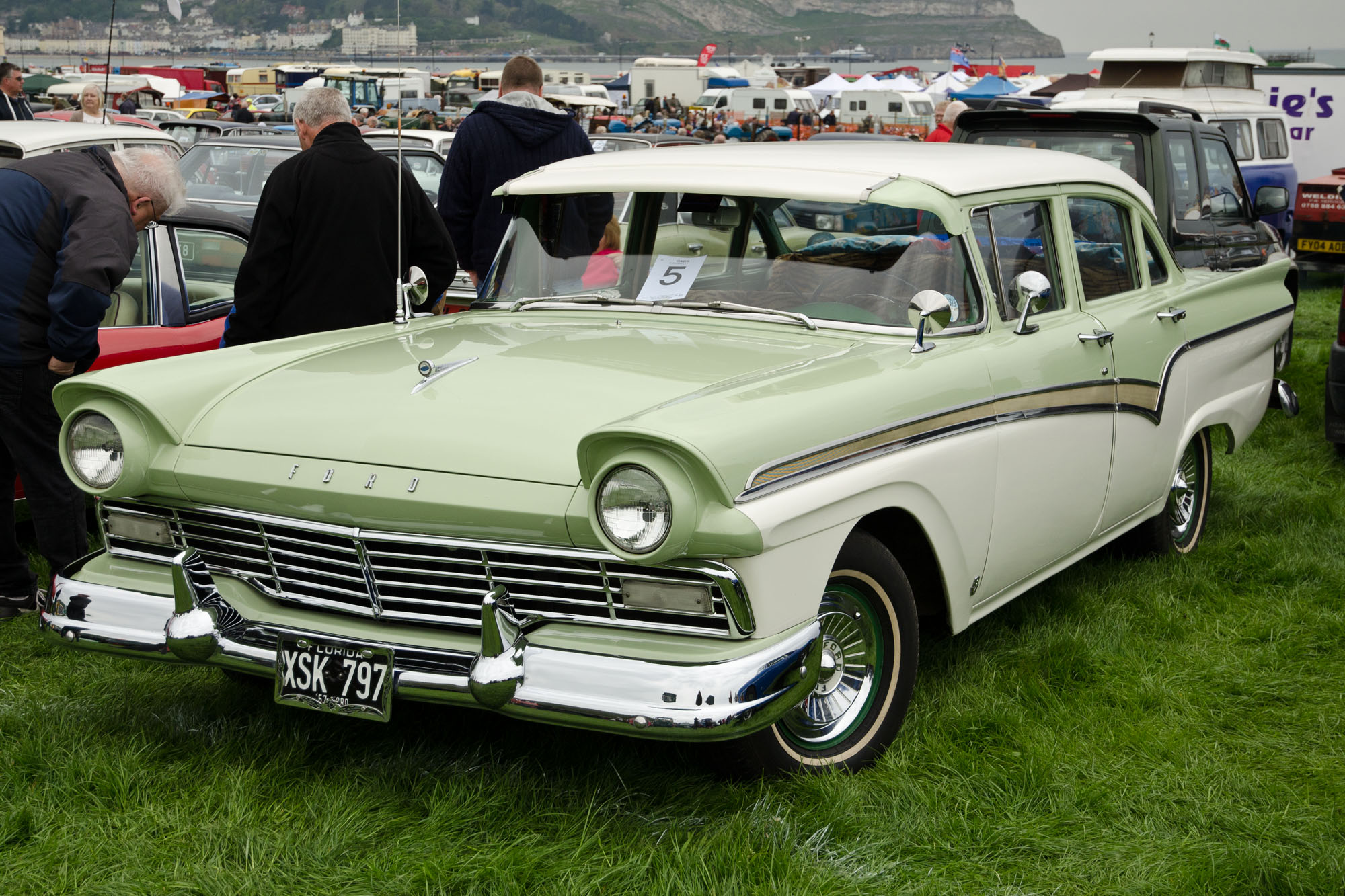
1957 Ford Fairlane 500 Town Sedan

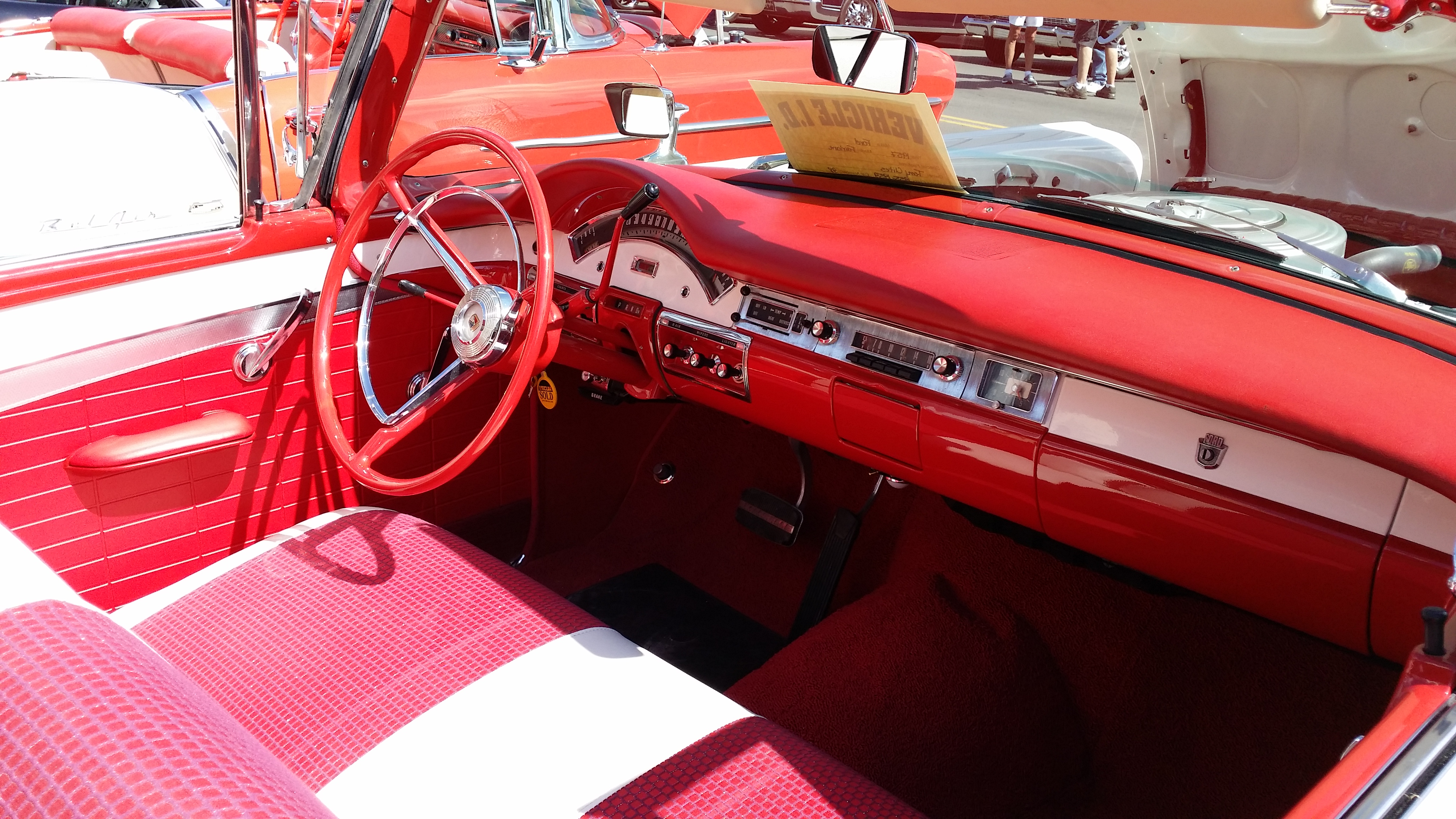
1957 Ford Fairlane 500 Skyliner interior

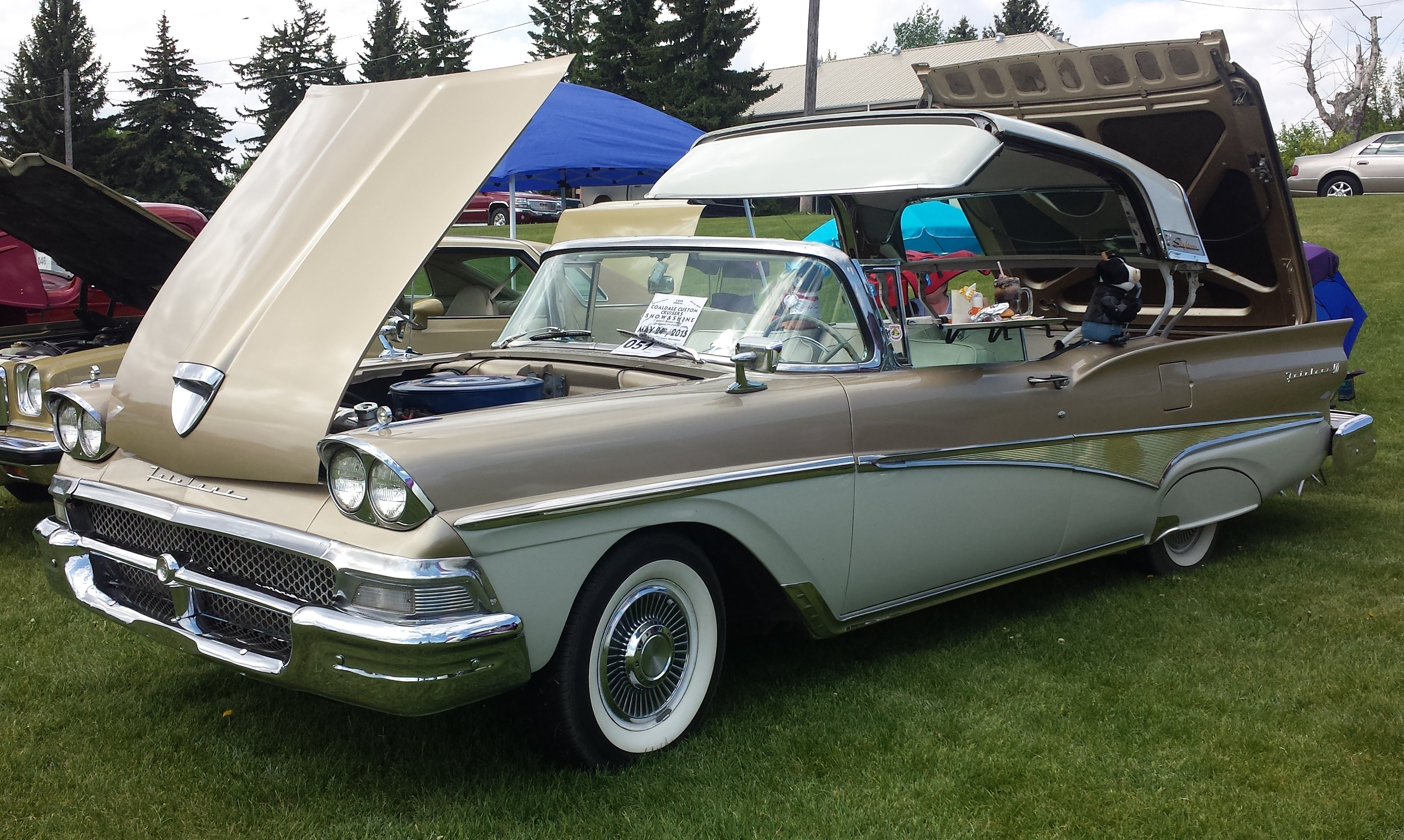
1958 Ford Fairlane 500 Skyliner showing the top mechanism in action

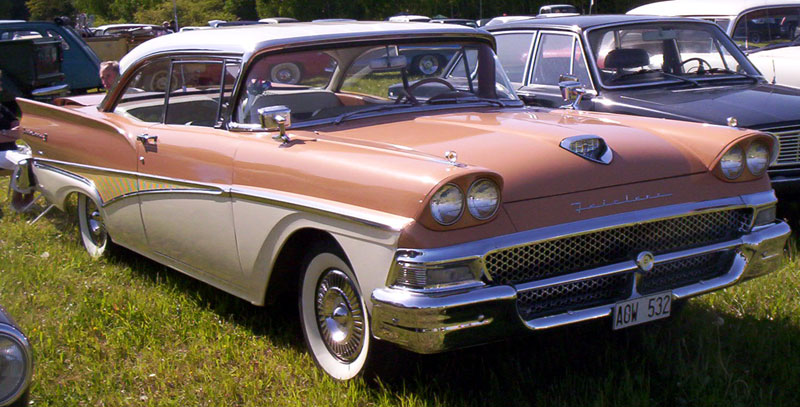
1958 Ford Fairlane 500 Victoria Club Coupe

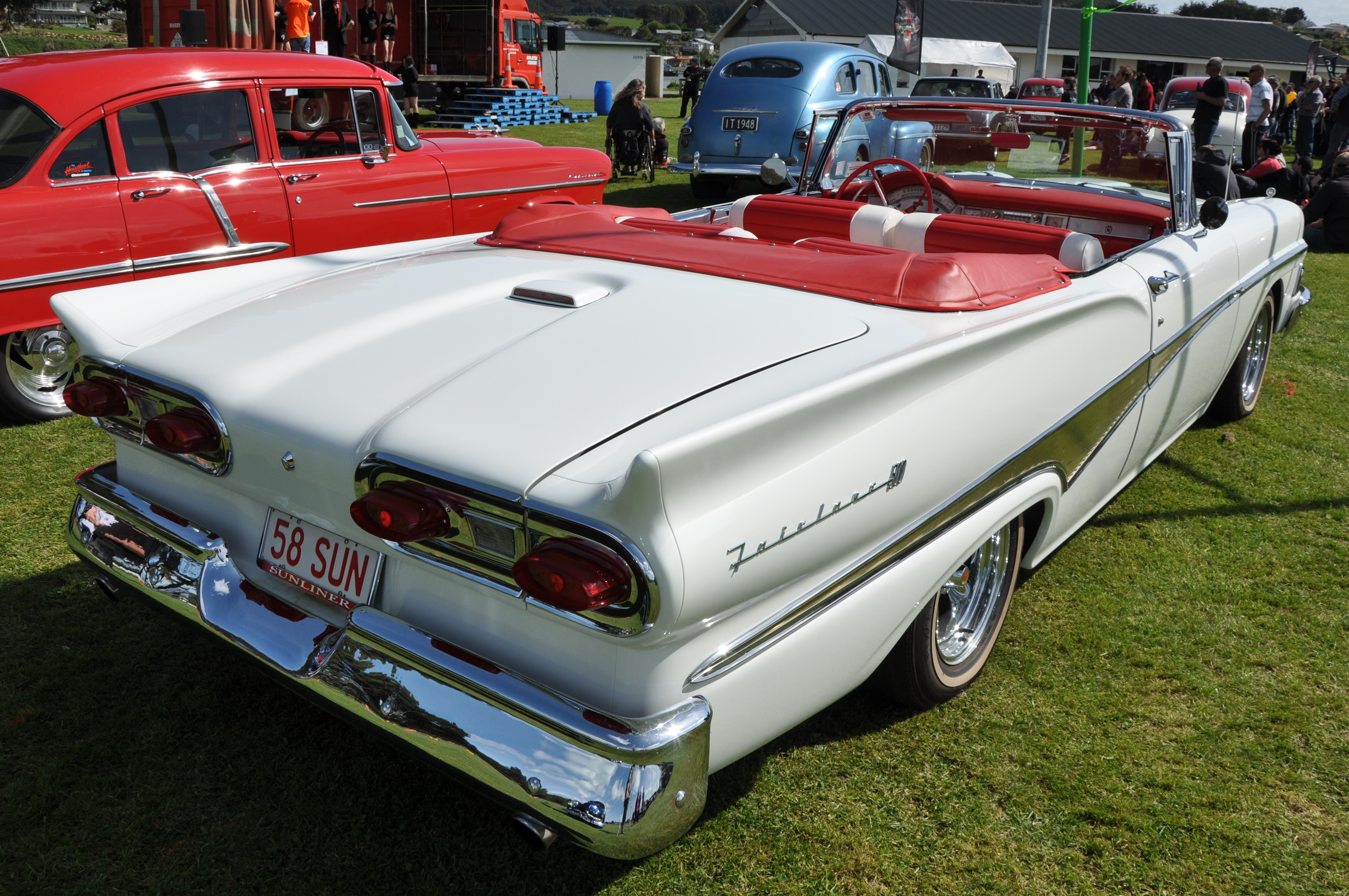
1958 Ford Fairlane Sunliner rear

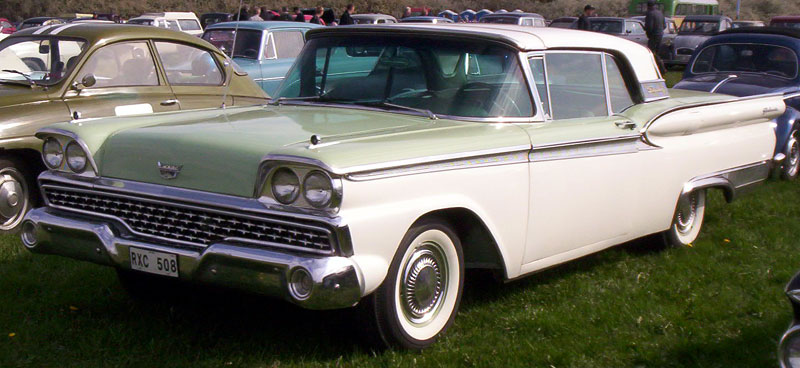
1959 Ford Fairlane 500 Skyliner

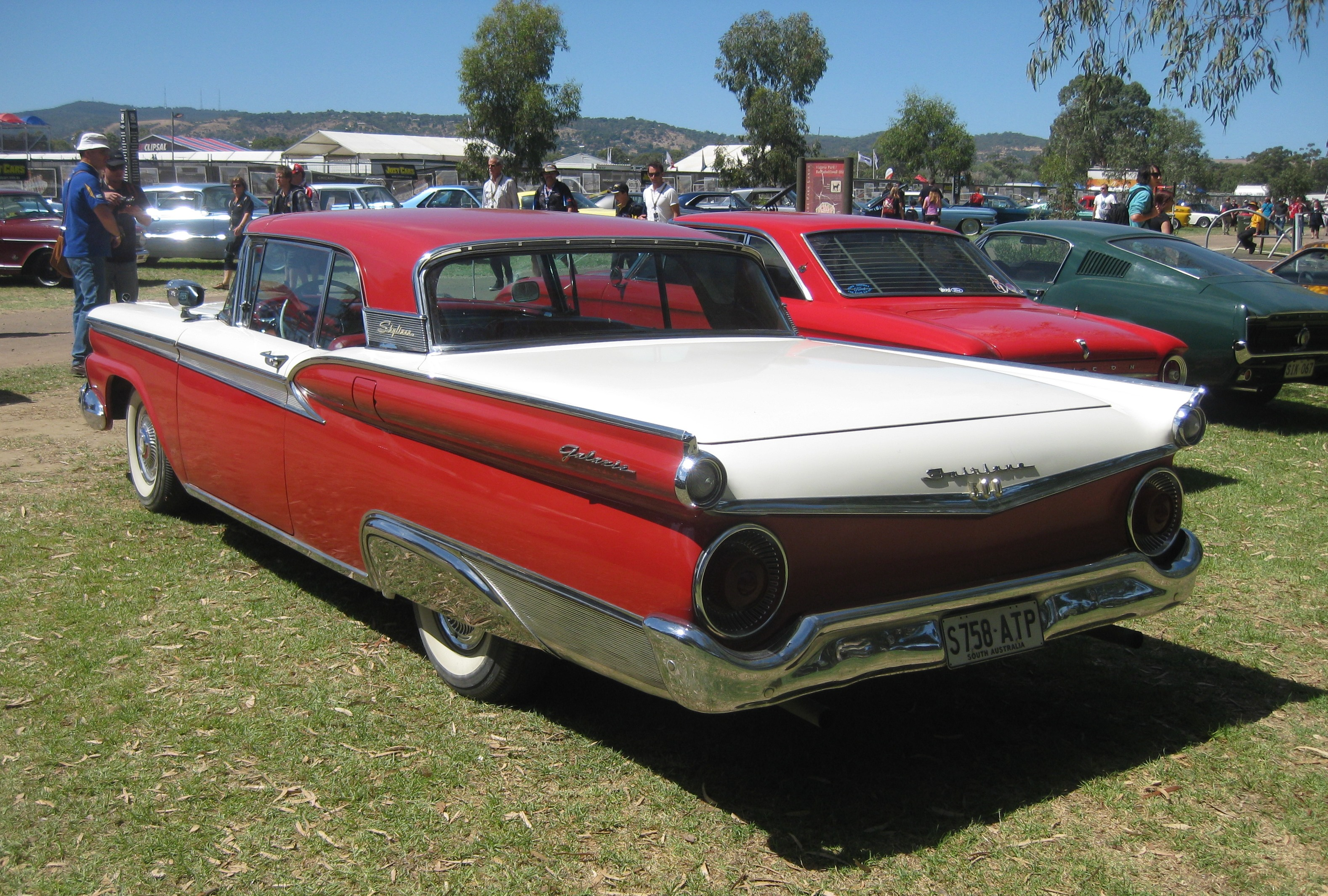
1959 Skyliner, the Ford Galaxie models displayed both "Fairlane 500" and "Galaxie" badges

== Third generation (1960–1961) ==
Third generation
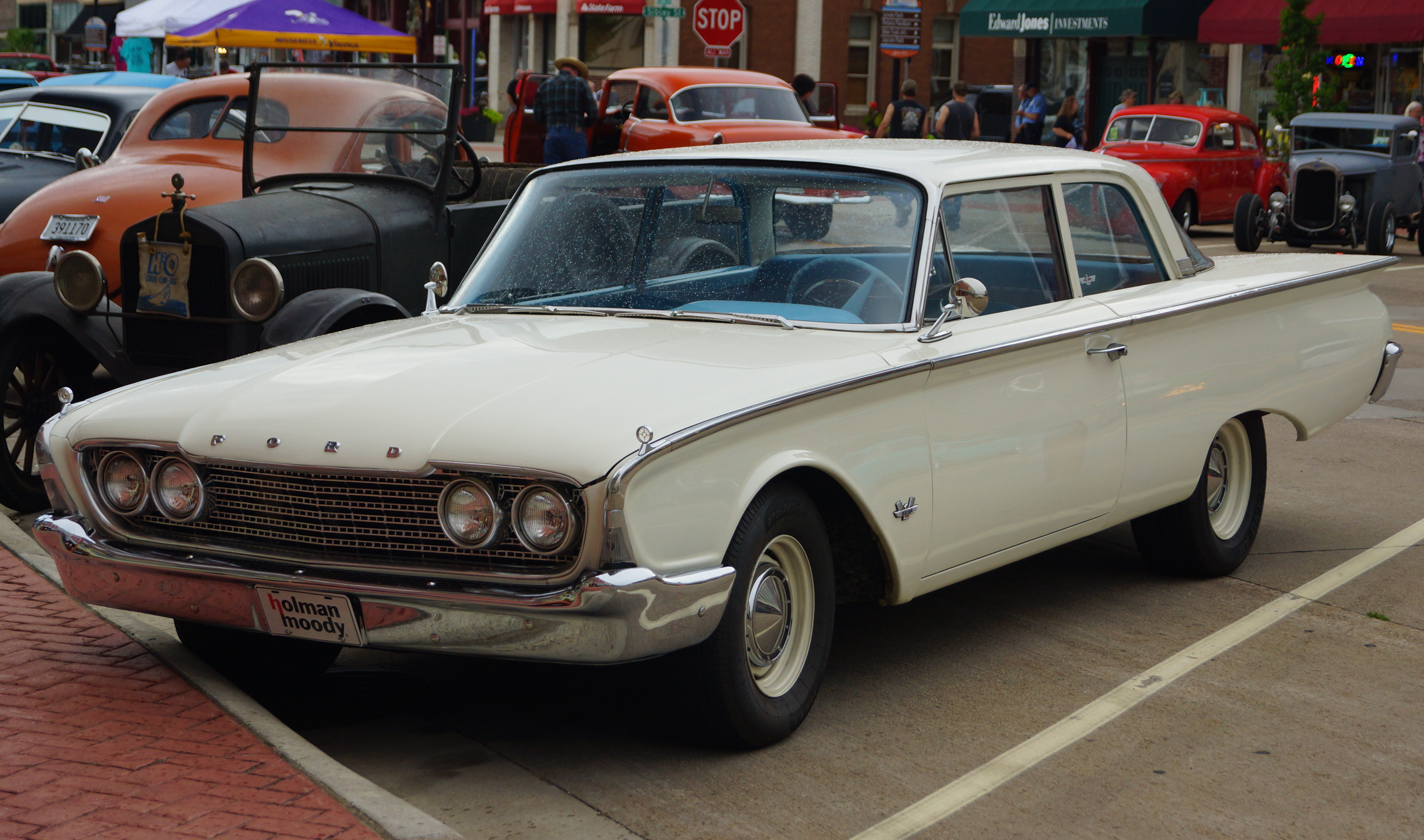
- 1960 Ford Fairlane 2-door sedan

Overview
- Production: 1960–1961

Body and chassis
- Body style: 2-door sedan 4-door sedan
- Chassis: body-on-frame
- Related: Ford Ranch Wagon; Ford Country Sedan; Mercury Meteor; Ford Galaxie

Powertrain
- Engine: 223 cu in (3.7 L) Mileage Maker I6; 292 cu in (4.8 L) Thunderbird V8; 352 cu in (5.8 L) Thunderbird V8; 390 cu in (6.4 L) Thunderbird V8 (1961)
- Transmission: 3-speed manual; 2-speed Fordomatic; 3-speed Cruise-O-Matic

Dimensions
- Wheelbase: 119 in (3,023 mm)

Full-sized Fairlane and Fairlane 500 models were restyled for 1960 and again for the 1961 model year. The Galaxie series continued as the top-of-the-line full-sized Ford. Fairlane 500s demoted to mid-level in the lineup and were equivalent to the Chevrolet Bel Air. Fairlanes were primarily sold as base level trim models for fleet use (taxi, police). Two bodystyles were available, a 2-door pillared sedan (Club Sedan and Business Sedan) and a 4-door pillared sedan (Town Sedan).

While the 1960 de luxe Galaxie and Fairlane 500 series sported a tri-color Ford crest on the hood, base Fairlanes had "FORD" in chrome block letters across their hoods. For 1961, all models got the block letters on their hoods.

The big-block 390 CID V8 was available in 1961 as the top-horsepower option, as the "horsepower wars" in Detroit continued.

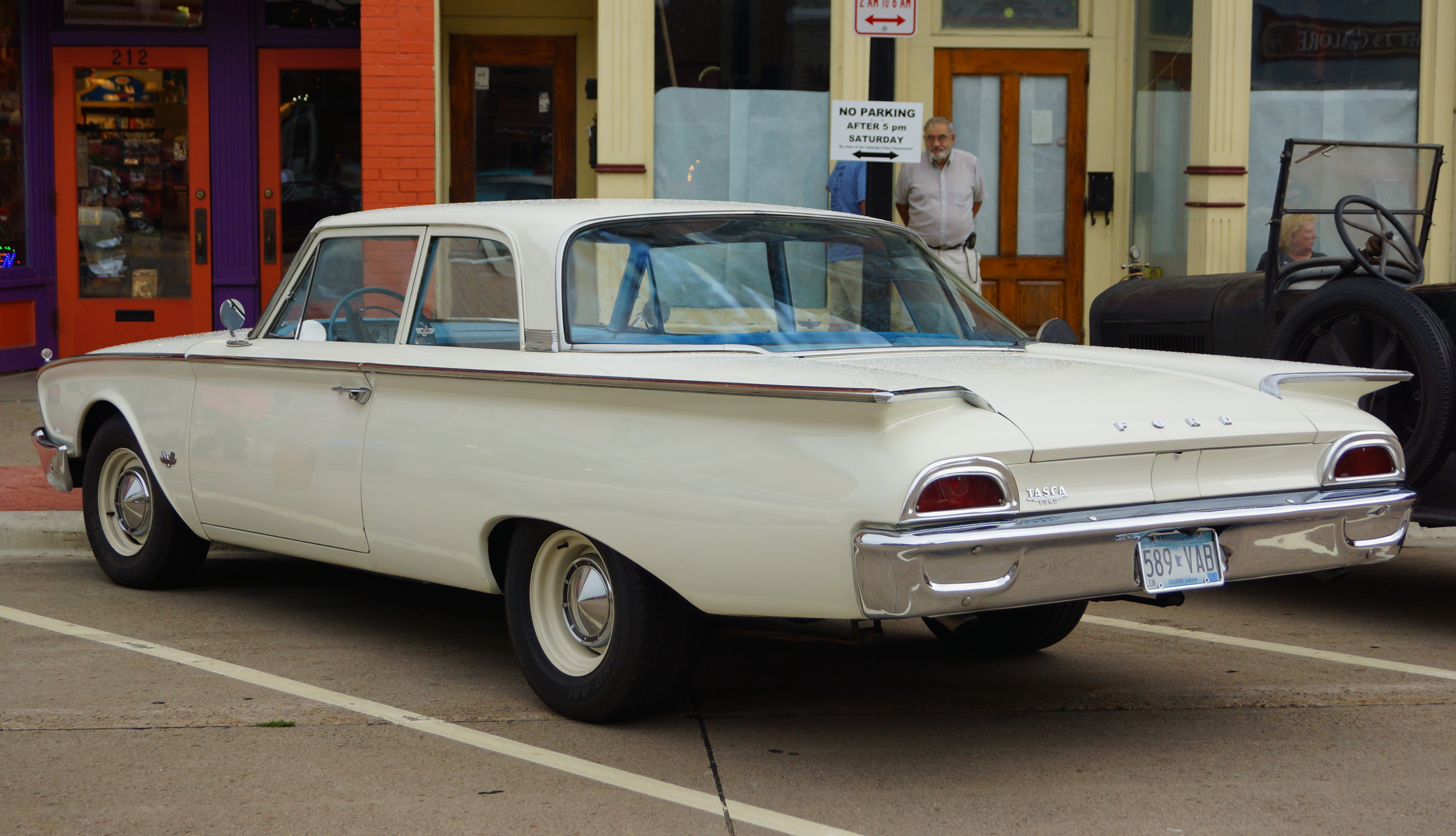
1960 Ford Fairlane Club Sedan rear

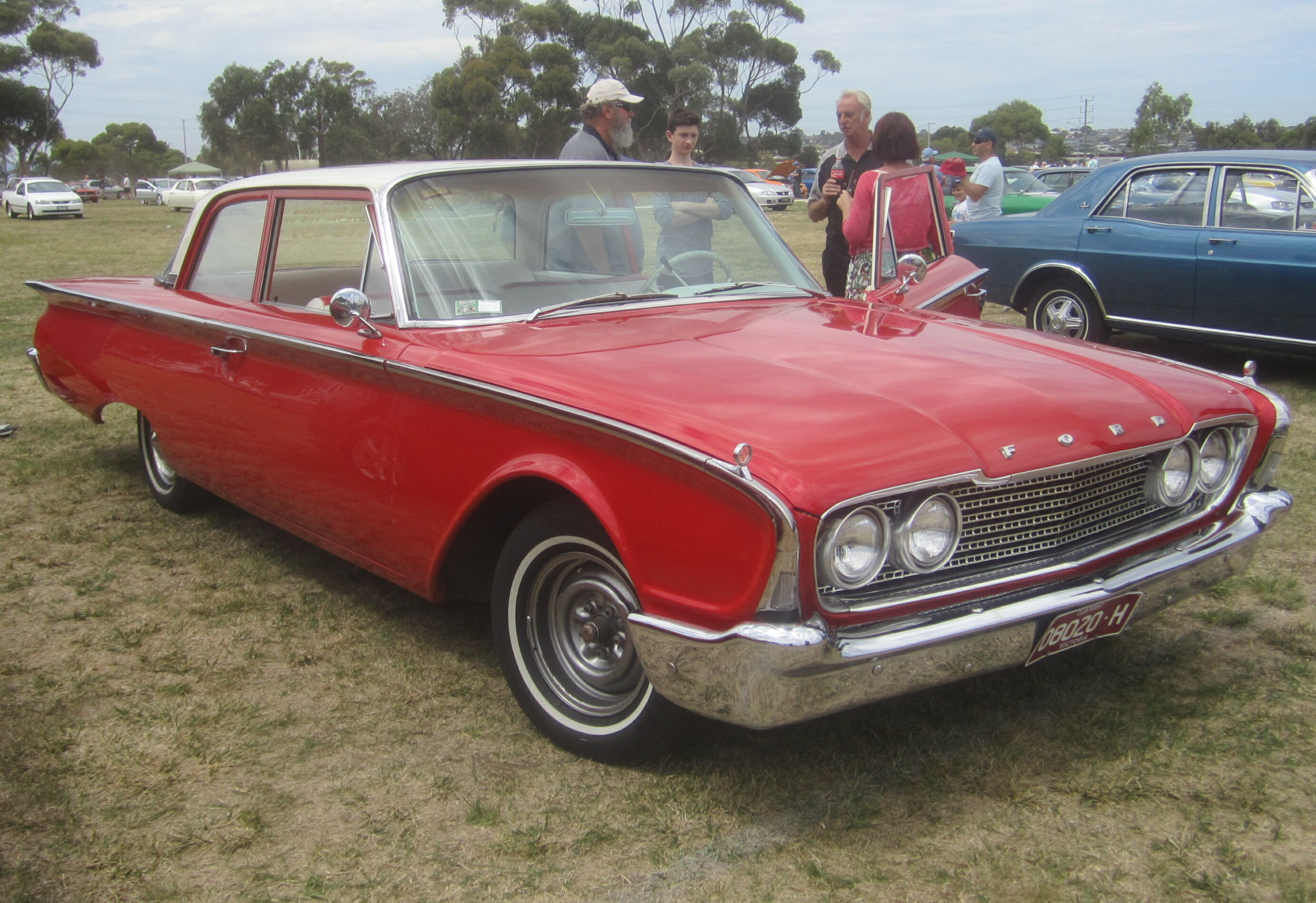
1960 Ford Fairlane Club Sedan

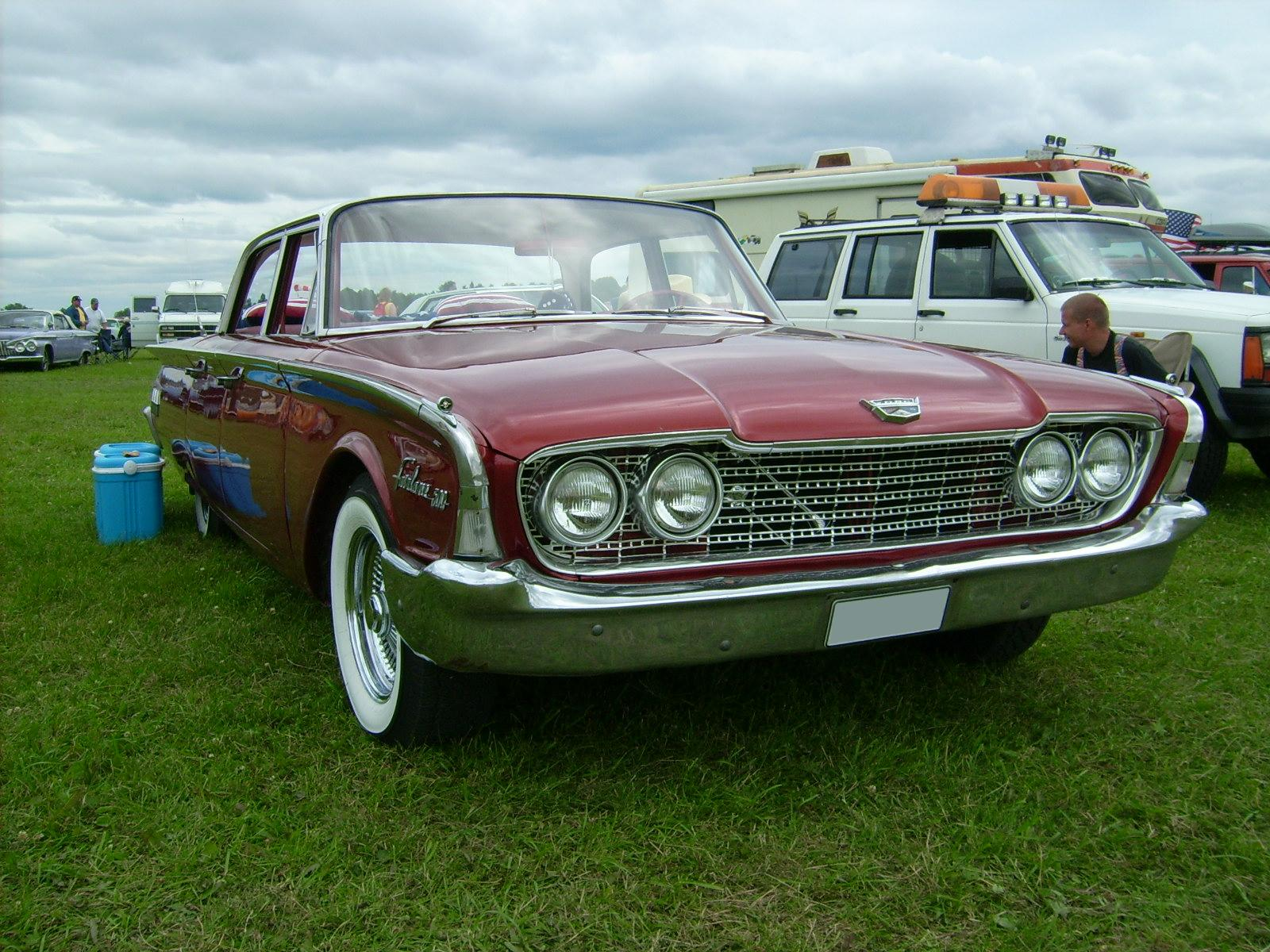
1960 Ford Fairlane 500 Town Sedan

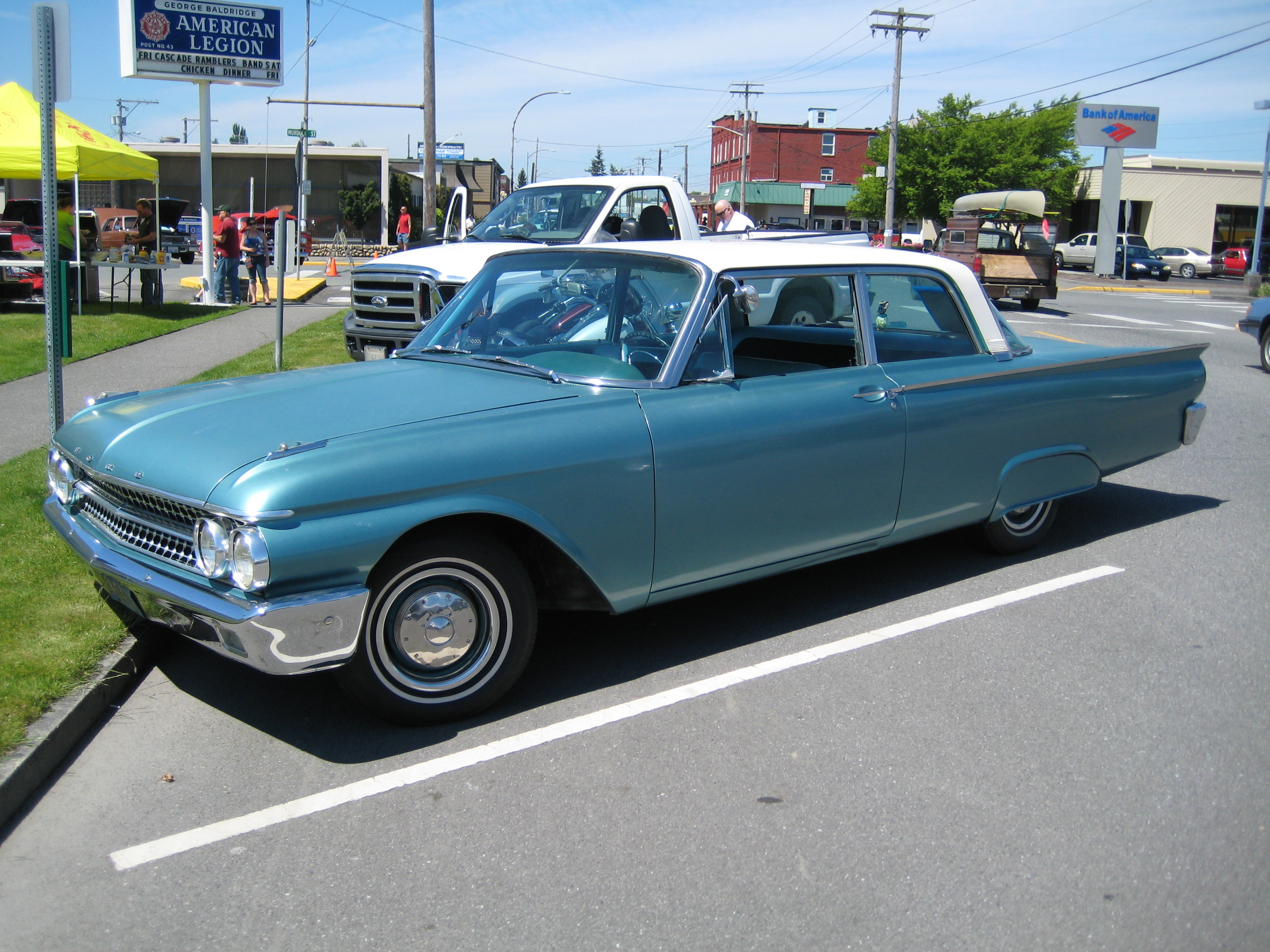
1961 Ford Fairlane 500 Club Sedan

== Fourth generation (1962–1965) ==
Fourth generation
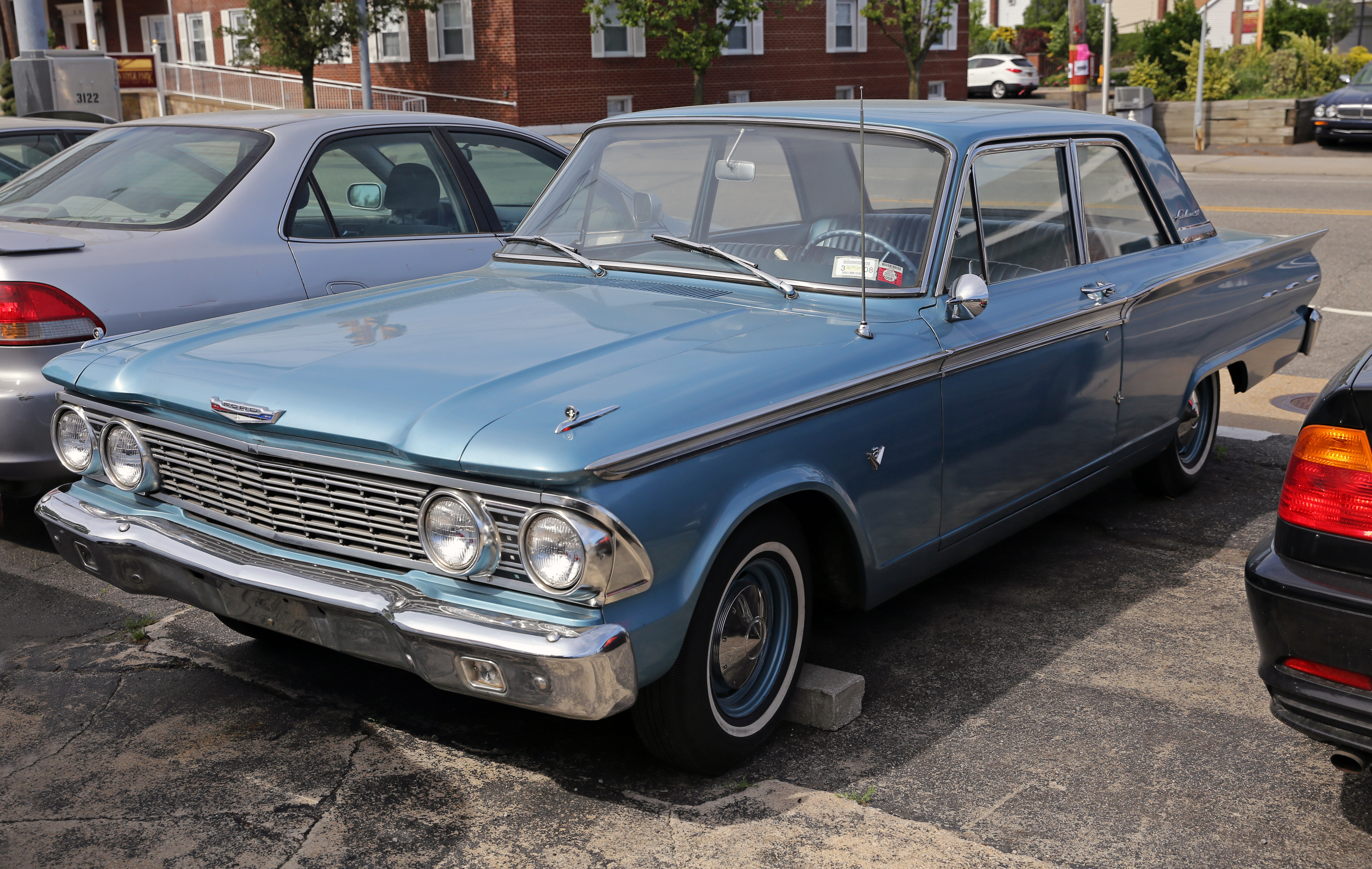
- 1962 Ford Fairlane 500 Club Sedan

Overview
- Production: 1962–1965
- Assembly: Metuchen, New Jersey; Lorain, Ohio; Milpitas, California; Oakville, Ontario, Canada; Flemington, Australia; Seaview, Lower Hutt, New Zealand

Body and chassis
- Body style: Two-door hardtop (1963–1965); Two-door sedan Four-door sedan Four-door station wagon (1963–1965)
- Chassis: unibody
- Related: Mercury Meteor; Ford Fairlane (Australia)

Powertrain
- Engine: 170 cu in (2.8 L) Fairlane I6 (1962–1964); 200 cu in (3.3 L) Fairlane I6 (1963–1965); 221 cu in (3.6 L) Challenger V8 (1962–1963); 260 cu in (4.3 L) Challenger V8 (1962–1964); 289 cu in (4.7 L) Challenger V8 (1963–1965); 427 cu in (7.0 L) FE V8 (1964)
- Transmission: 3/4-speed manual; 2-speed Ford-O-Matic (1962–1964); 3-speed Cruise-O-Matic (1964–1965)

Dimensions
- Wheelbase: 115.5 in (2,934 mm)
- Length: 197.6 in (5,019 mm)
- Width: 71.3 in (1,811 mm)
- Curb weight: 2,930–2,970 lb (1,329–1,347 kg)

The Fairlane name was moved to Ford's new intermediate, introduced for the 1962 model year, to bridge the gap between the compact Ford Falcon and the full-sized Galaxie, making it a competitor for GM's A-body "senior compacts", the Plymouth Belvedere, and the AMC Rambler. With an overall length of 197 in (5004 mm) and a wheelbase of 115.5 in (2934 mm), it was 16 in (406 mm) longer than the Falcon and 12.3 in (312 mm) shorter than the Galaxie. Wheel track varied from 53.5 in (1355 mm) to 56 in (1422 mm) depending on model and specification.

Like the Falcon, the Fairlane had a unibody frame, but the body incorporated an unusual feature Ford dubbed torque boxes, four boxed structures in the lower body structure designed to absorb road shock by moving slightly in the vertical plane. Suspension was a conventional short-long arm independent arrangement in front, with Hotchkiss drive in the rear. The Fairlane was initially offered only in two-door or four-door sedan body styles.

The Fairlane's standard engine was the 170 CID (2.8 L) six, but as an option, it introduced Ford's new, lightweight small-block Windsor V8, initially with a displacement of 221 CID (3.6 L) and 145 hp (108 kW); a 260 CID (4.2 L) "Challenger" version with an advertised 164 hp (122 kW) was added at mid-year. The Sports Coupe option débuted mid-year and featured bucket seats and a small floor console. The trim level supplemented the Fairlane and Fairlane 500 trim levels (the 500 model had more decorative trim, such as a wider chrome stripe down the side and three bullets on the rear quarter panels). The Challenger 289 CID engine was introduced in mid-1963, with solid lifters and other performance pieces helping the engine produce an advertised 271 hp (202 kW); however, it was equipped with single exhaust like the less powerful engines. This engine was coded "K" in the vehicle identification number. Exterior identification was by fender-mounted "V" badges that read "289 High Performance". That same year, station wagons arrived, called the Ranch Wagon and Ranch Custom Wagon. All 1962 Fairlanes had "B" posts despite the popularity of the pillarless hardtop and convertible styles in that era.

Ford saw the problem and introduced two pillarless hardtop coupes for 1963, in Fairlane 500 and Sports Coupe trim. For 1963 and later Sports Coupe models, the center console, which had come from the Falcon parts bin for 1962, was changed to be similar to that of the Galaxie. Sports Coupe models got a floor-mounted shift lever for the center console when Cruise-O-Matic or 4-speed manual transmissions were specified; however when the two-speed Fordomatic was ordered, the shift lever was installed on the steering column (and the console was the same without the shifter). Front-end styling for the 1963 models mimicked the big Galaxie models, but the rear end retained the small tailfins and "pieplate" tail lamp styling cues. The Squire wagon (a fake woodie) was available for 1963 only, including one model with front bucket seats. The "Swing-Away" steering wheel became an option in 1964.

The 1964 and 1965, Fairlane ranges consisted of similar body styles: base Fairlane and Fairlane 500 two-door coupes and four-door sedans, and Fairlane 500 and Sports Coupe two-door hardtops. As in 1963, the Sports Coupe got its own standard "spinner" wheel covers and extra exterior brightwork. Large "Sports Coupe" scripts graced the "C" pillars. The Fairlane Squire wagon was dropped, but the standard station wagon was continued. The 221 V8 was dropped after 1963, leaving the six as the base engine and the 260 as the base V8. The "K-code" 271-horsepower 289 V8 continued into 1964, gaining dual exhausts, while a 195 horsepower (145 kW) version of the 289 with a two-barrel carburetor and hydraulic lifters was introduced. The two-speed Fordomatic continued as the automatic transmission choice for the 260 in 1964, while 289 V8s got the three-speed Cruise-O-Matic transmission option. All 1965 models featured 14-inch (360 mm) wheels as standard, in place of the earlier 13-inch (330 mm) wheels, and Fordomatic was finally phased out, leaving the Cruise-O-Matic as the only automatic available for the Fairlane. The 260 was also dropped after 1964, leaving the two-barrel 289 as the base V8. Styling-wise, in 1964, a new grille and headlight bezels were introduced, the tail fins were dropped, some chrome decorating on the side was changed, and the shape of the trunk lid changed. Styling features for 1965 included body-color headlight bezels for the deluxe models and rectangular taillight lenses, a return to the 1962-1963 trunk lid, along with less chrome on the body and a small standup hood ornament.

Australian and New Zealand models had longer cut-outs in the rear bumper to accommodate their license plates.

Australian models had the "reverse light" tail light which was used for an amber rear turn signal.

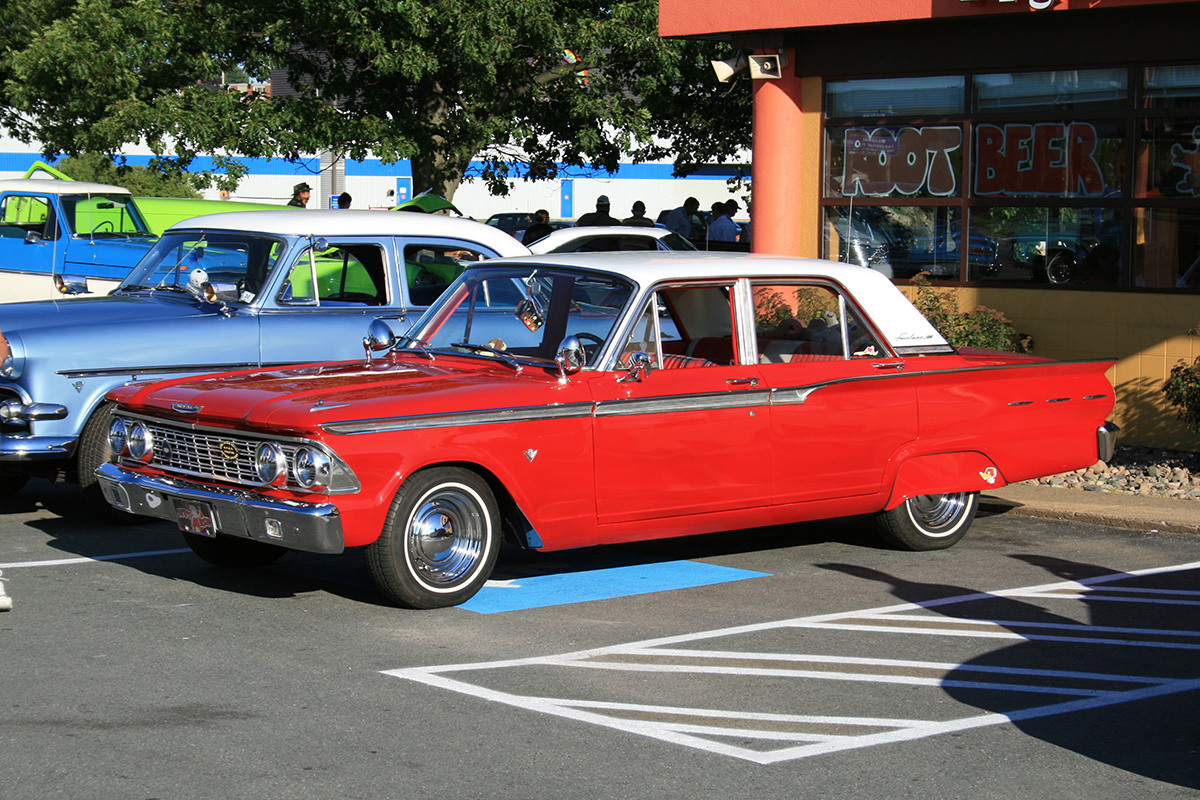
1962 Ford Fairlane 500 Town Sedan

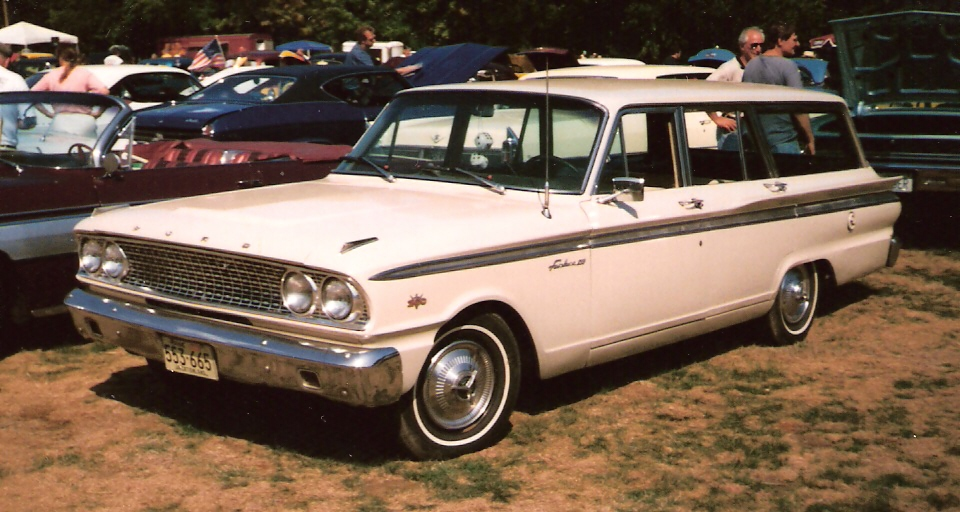
1963 Ford Fairlane 500 Custom Ranch Wagon

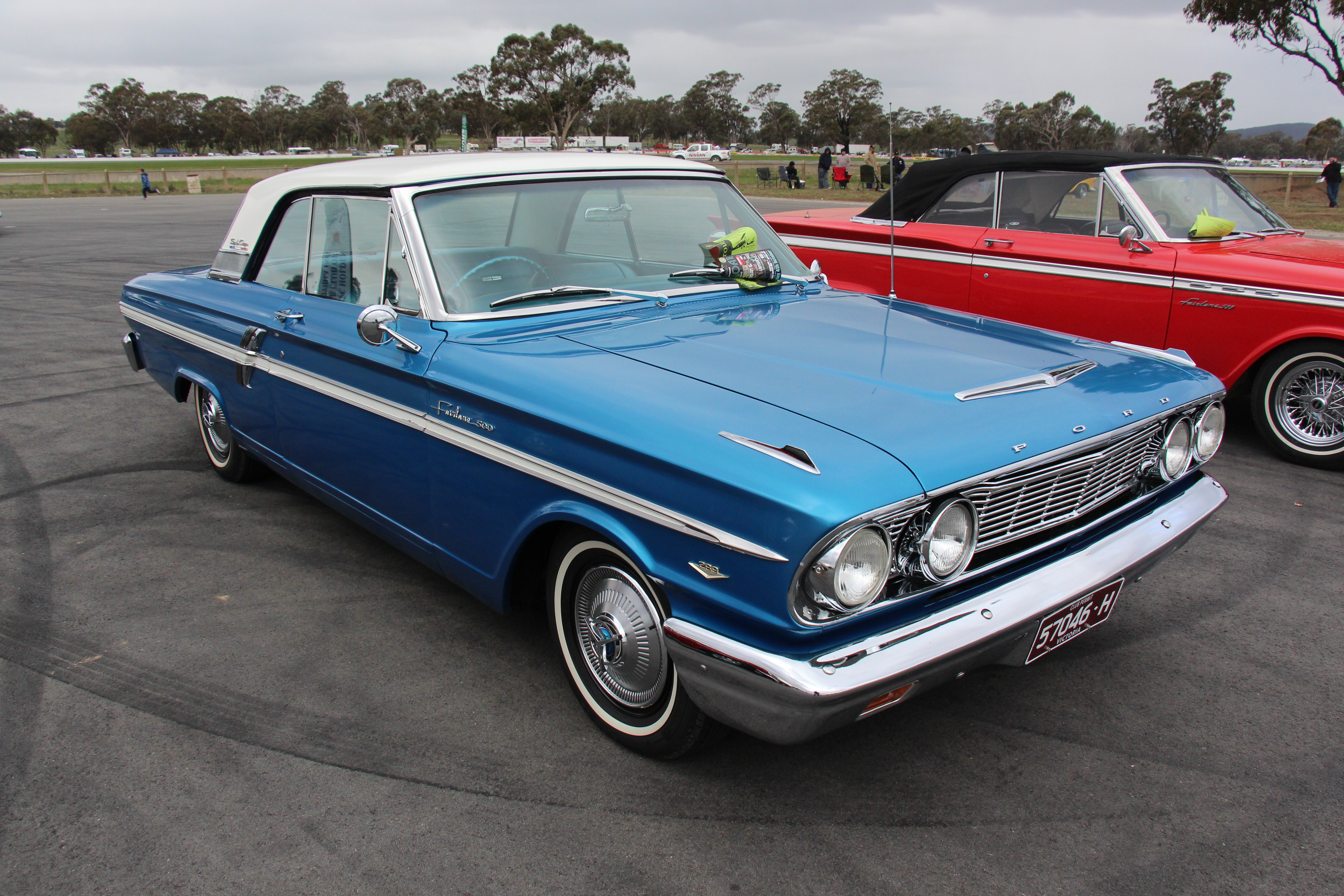
1964 Ford Fairlane 500 Sports Coupe. This example from Australia was modified to a right-hand drive model.

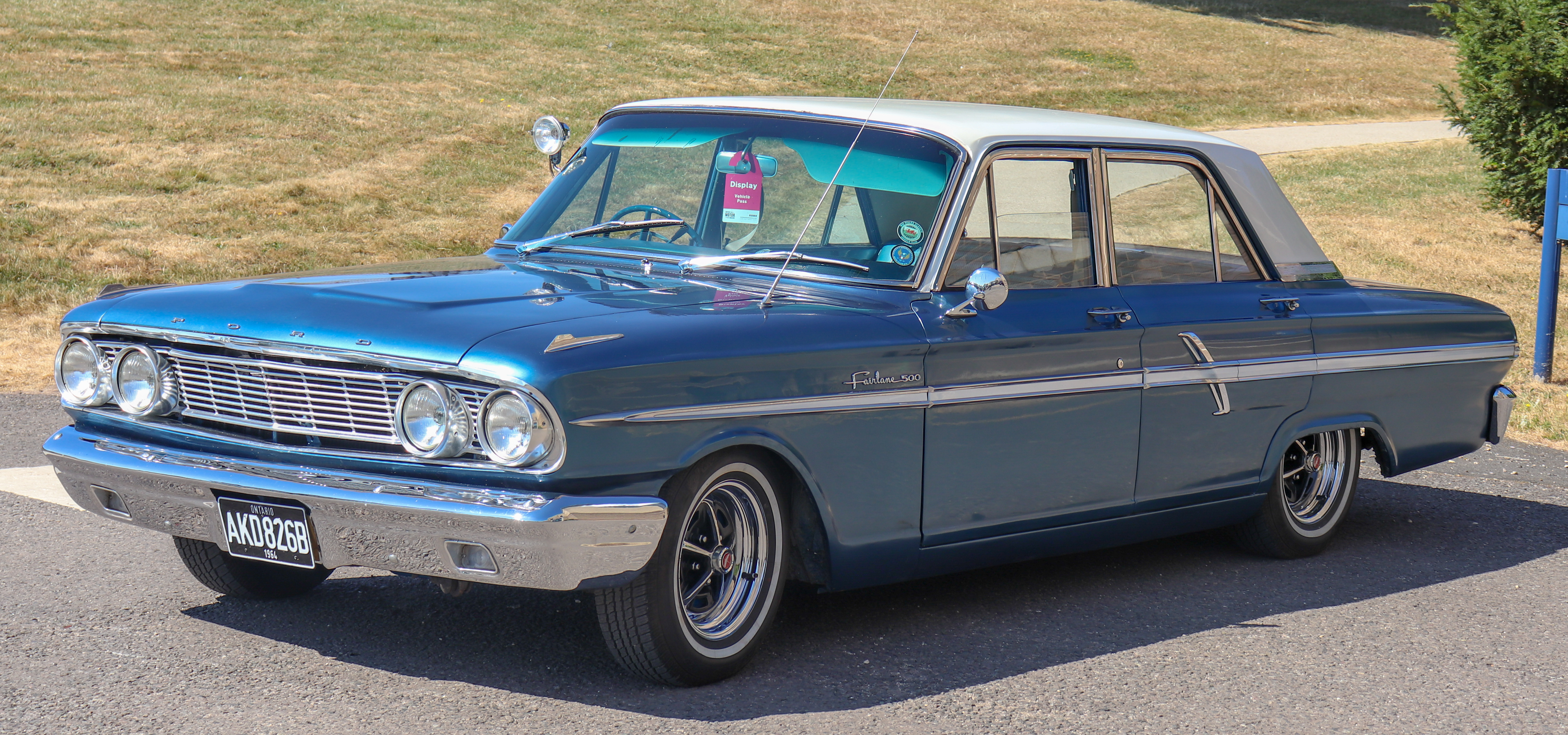
1964 Ford Fairlane 500 4-Door Sedan

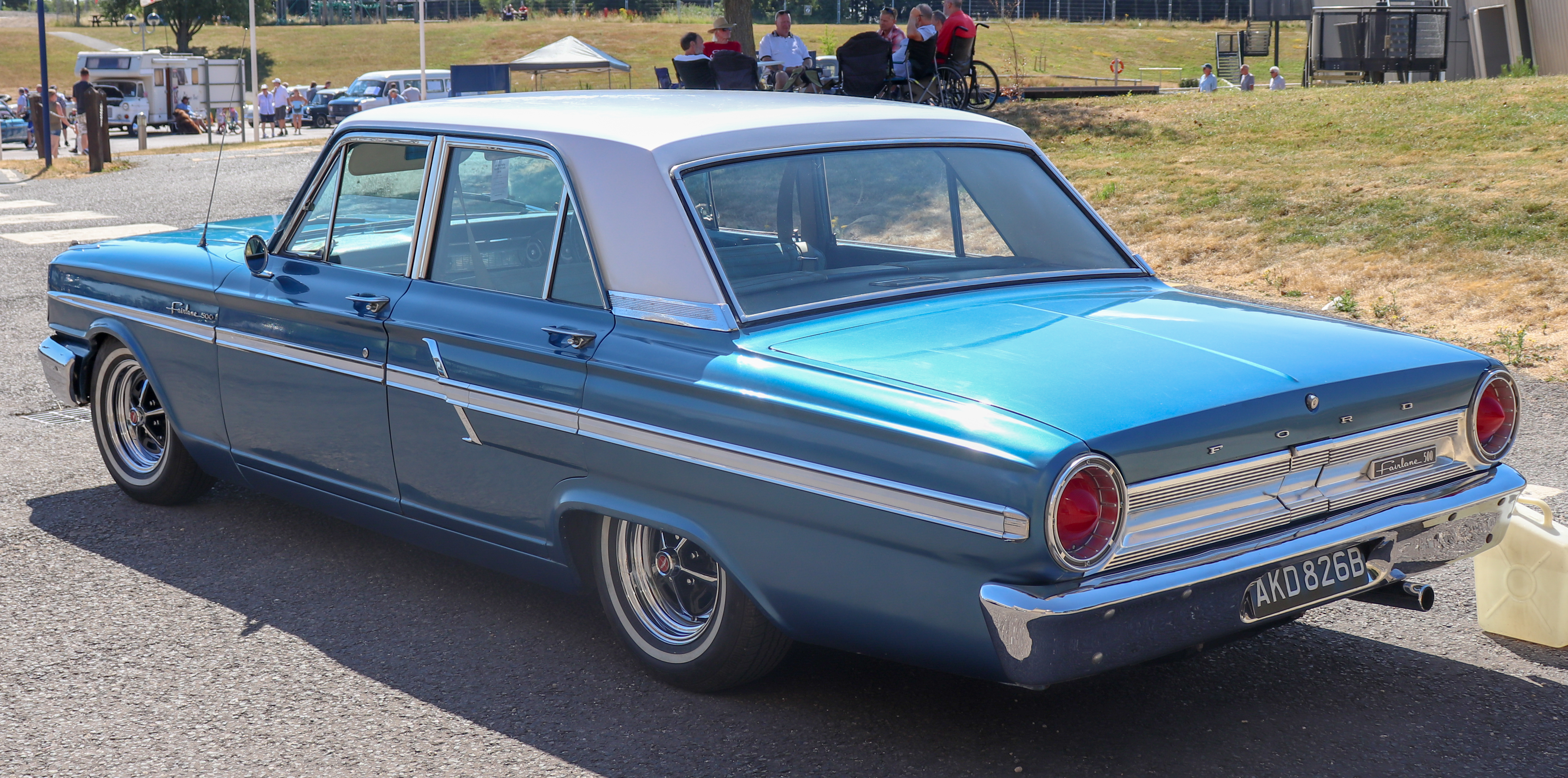
1964 Ford Fairlane 500 4-Door Sedan

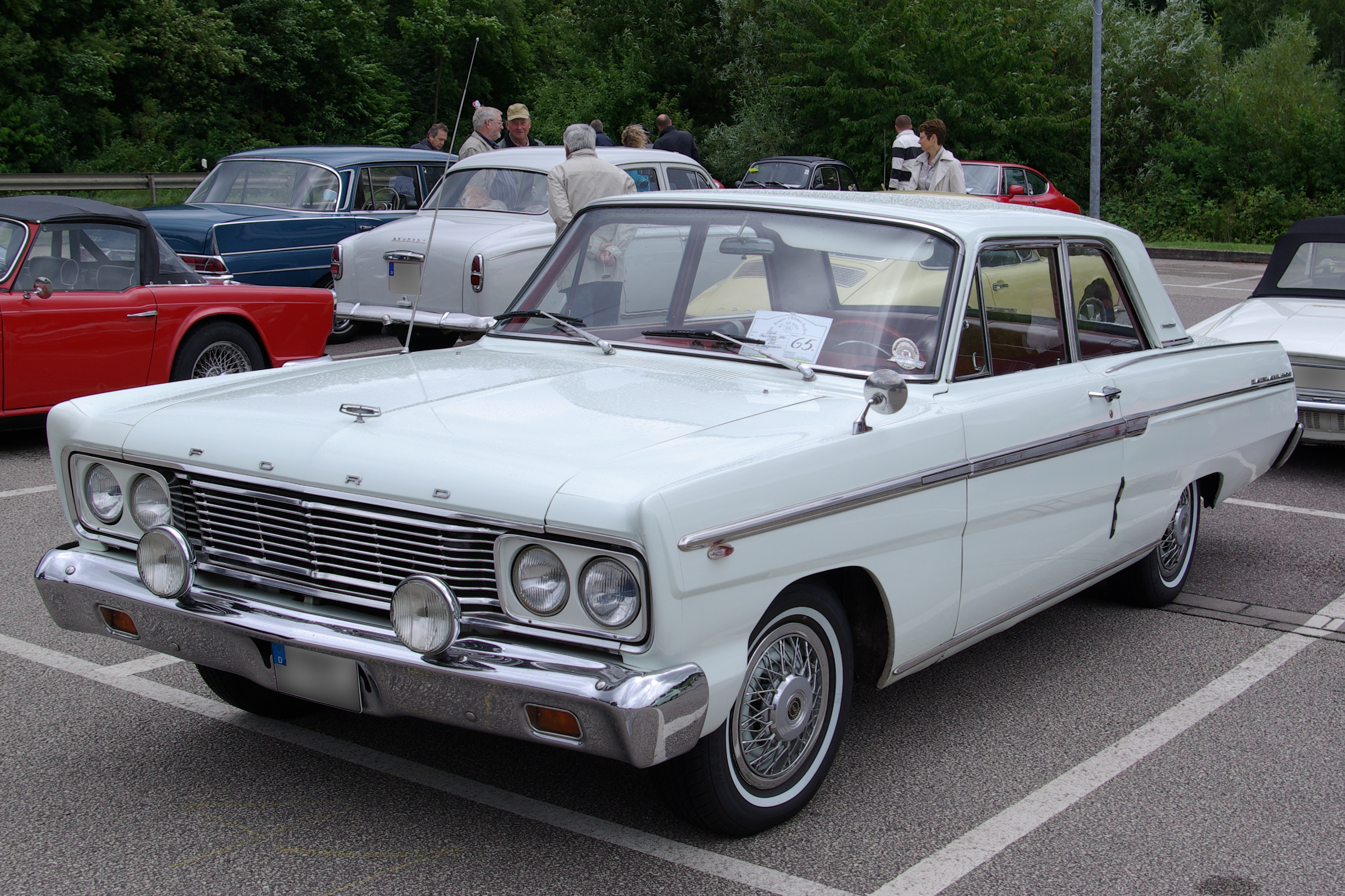
1965 Ford Fairlane 500 2-Door Sedan

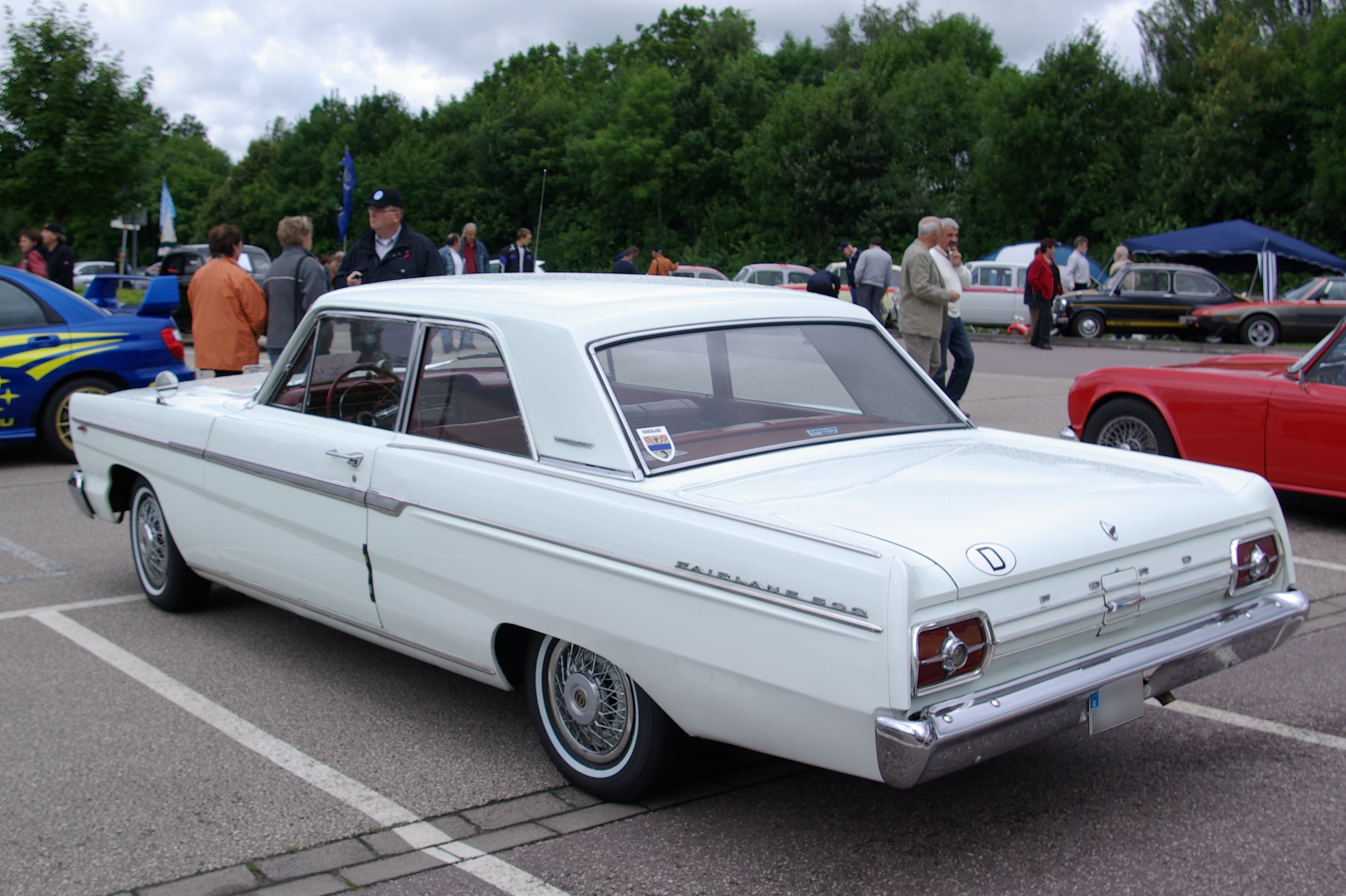
1965 Ford Fairlane 500 2-Door Sedan

=== Thunderbolt ===
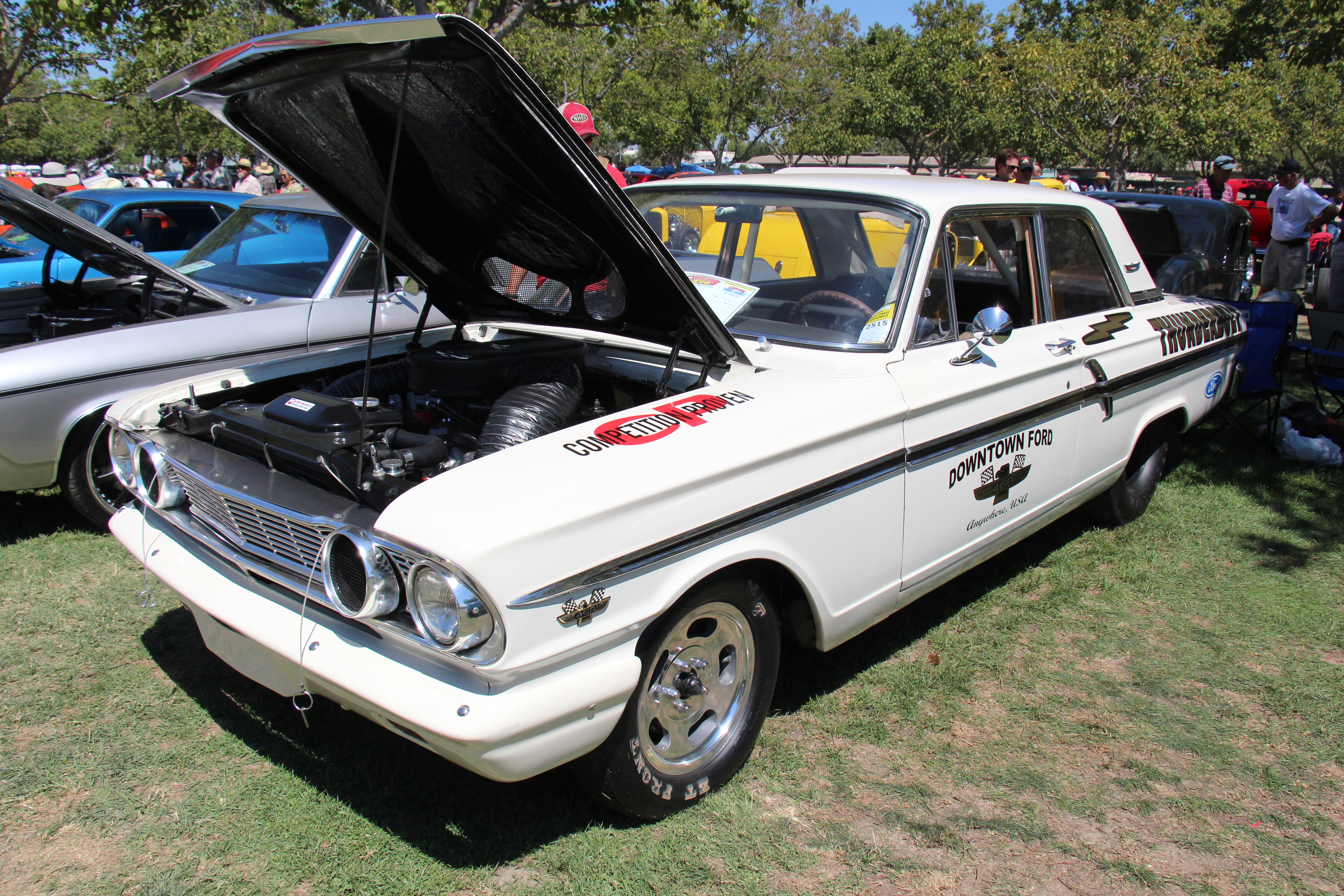
1964 Ford Fairlane Thunderbolt

As the muscle car market took shape, Ford built a small number of Fairlane two door sedans prepared for drag racing during the 1963 season. These cars were running the 289 and were set up at Dearborn Steel Tubing that built the special cars for Ford special vehicle operations. These soon evolved into the "Thunderbolts" for 1964. The racing Thunderbolt was a two-door post car, heavily modified to incorporate Ford's new 427 CID (7.0 L) V8 race engine with two four-barrel carburetors on a high-riser manifold, ram-air through the openings left by deleting the inboard headlights, equal-length headers, trunk-mounted battery, several fiberglass parts (hood, door skins, fenders, and front bumper), acrylic glass windows, and other lightweight options, including deleted rear-door window winders, carpeting, radio, sealant, sun visors, armrests, jack, lug wrench, heater, soundproofing, and passenger-side windshield wiper. The cars wore Fairlane 500 trim, and were only offered with the two-door sedan body. This special model, of which 111 to 127 total were made (sources disagree), delivered a rated 425 hp (317 kW) at 7,500 rpm.

Racing in NHRA Super Stock (which required only fifty cars be available to the public), on 7-inch (180 mm)-wide tires, the Thunderbolt was based on the midlevel Fairlane 500 two-door pillared sedan, and in 1964 set elapsed time and top speed records at 11.6 seconds and 124 mph (200 km/h). took the Super Stock title (with Gas Ronda taking the honors), and won the Manufacturer's Cup. The car as delivered was slightly too light to meet NHRA's 3200-lb (1451-kg) minimum weight unless it was raced with a full tank of gasoline, which would bring it to 3203 lb (1453 kg). NHRA rules at the time required a metal front bumper, so the cars began to be supplied with an aluminum bumper and previous purchasers were supplied with one.

Thunderbolt production was ended due to NHRA rule changes for Super Stock competition, requiring 500 vehicles be built to be entered in that class. Ford had been losing $1500 to $2000 on each Thunderbolt sold at the sticker price of $3900. The first 11 Thunderbolts were painted maroon (known as Vintage Burgundy in Ford literature), the rest white; 99 had manual transmissions. Many are still raced. About 50 similar Mercury Cyclones were also produced by Ford in 1964, destined to be modified to represent Ford in A/FX competition, which they dominated, as well. These vehicles varied greatly in wheel track due to customer options for varying suspension and wheel/tire combinations. Front tracks from 54 to 56 in and rear tracks from 53.5 to 55.5 in were common.

== Fifth generation (1966–1967) ==
Fifth generation
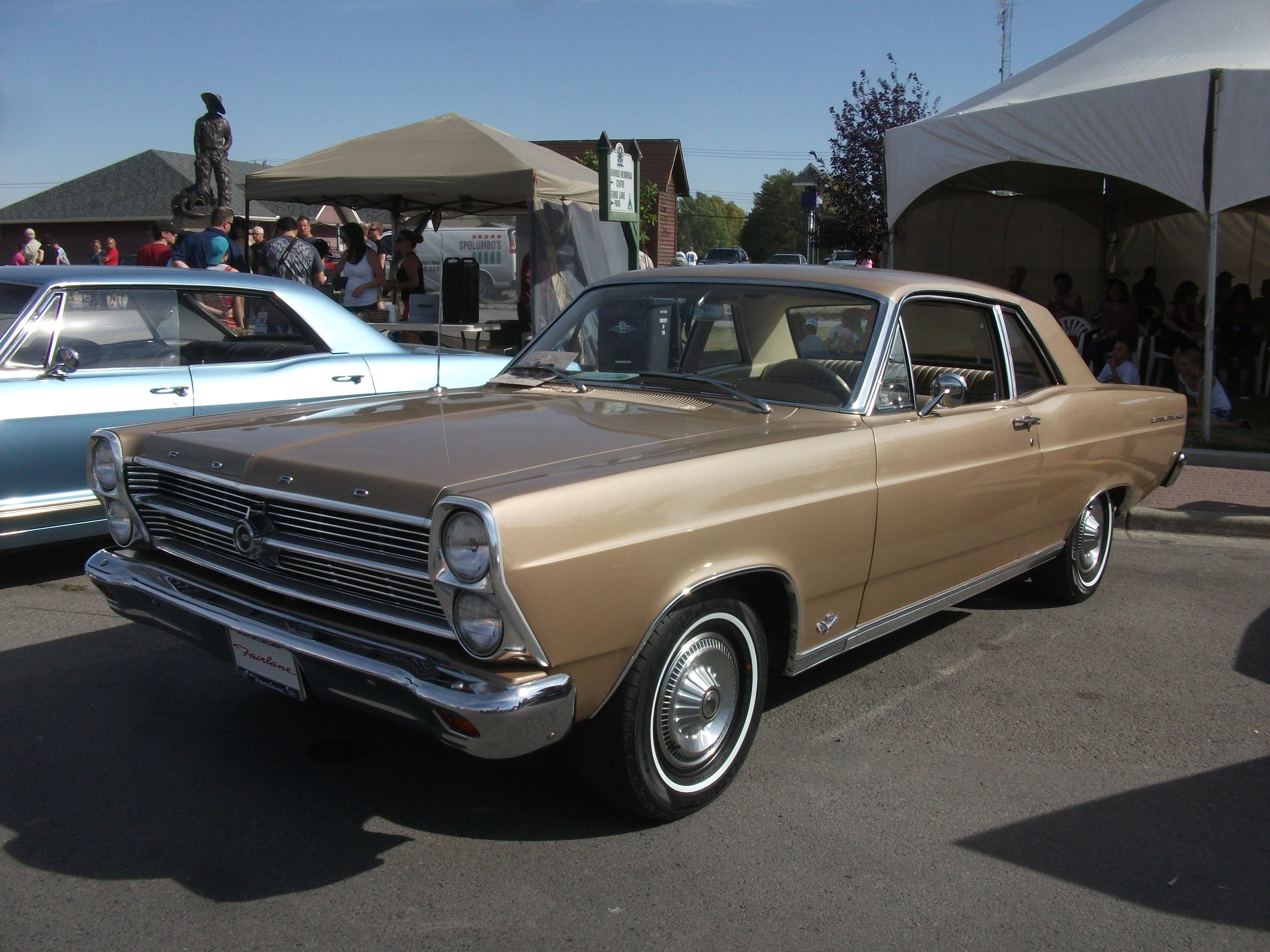
- 1966 Ford Fairlane 500 Club Coupe

Overview
- Production: 1966–1967
- Assembly: Metuchen, NJ; Lorain, OH; Milpitas, CA; Atlanta, GA

Body and chassis
- Body style: Two-door hardtop Two-door convertible Two-door sedan Four-door sedan Four-door station wagon
- Chassis: unibody
- Related: Ford Ranchero; Mercury Comet; Ford Fairlane (Australia)

Powertrain
- Engine: 200 cu in (3.3 L) Fairlane I6; 289 cu in (4.7 L) Challenger V8; 390 cu in (6.4 L) Thunderbird V8; 427 cu in (7.0 L) Cobra V8
- Transmission: 3/4-speed manual; 3-speed Cruise-O-Matic

Dimensions
- Wheelbase: 116 in (2,946 mm); 113 in (2,870 mm) (wagon)
- Length: 197 in (5,004 mm)
- Width: 74.4 in (1,890 mm)
- Curb weight: 2,747–3,493 lb (1,246–1,584 kg)

For 1966 the Fairlane became a long wheelbase longer body version of the revised Falcon platform with the mid size wagon bodies common to both model lines. The appearance was changed to match the full-sized Ford Galaxie, which had been restyled in the 1965 model year, and adopted vertically stacked dual headlights. The XL, GT, and GTA packages were introduced, as well as a convertible to join the existing range of sedans, hardtops, and station wagons. The "K-code" 289 CID engine was dropped this year. The GT featured a 390 CID FE V8 as standard, while the GTA also included the newly introduced the SportShift Cruise-o-Matic automatic transmission. The GT/GTA 390 CID engine developed 335 bhp (250 kW) with higher compression, and had a four-barrel carburetor. Mid year, Ford produced 57 special Fairlane 500 two-door hardtops with "R-code" 427 cu in (7.0 L) V8 engine rated at 425 bhp (431 PS; 317 kW) at 6000 rpm and 480 lb⋅ft (651 N⋅m) at 3700 rpm of torque, equipped with Ford's "Top-Loader" four-speed manual transmission. Built to qualify the engine/transmission combination for NHRA and IHRA Super Stock racing, they were white and had fiberglass hoods with a forward-facing hood scoop which ended at the edge of the hood. The Fairlane Squire wagon was reintroduced for 1966.

Minor trim changes were introduced for 1967 as the Fairlane was mildly facelifted. For the 1967 model year the Ranchero pickup based on the same platform switched from using the Falcon front end styling to the Fairlane front end design. The 289 CID small-block was the base V8, with a 200 CID six standard, with the 390 CID optional (with either two- or four-barrel carburetor, at 275 and 320 bhp (240 kW), respectively). The 427s were still available, either with a single four-barrel carburetor or dual quad carbs, developing 410 (W-code) and 425 bhp (R-code), 427s were available on XL models, but very few were built.

Adapted across the entire range of Ford models for 1967, Fairlanes included a number of federal government-mandated safety features, including a new energy-absorbing steering column with a large padded steering wheel hub, soft interior trim, four-way hazard flashers, a dual-chamber braking system, and shoulder belt anchors. The convertible had a tempered safety glass rear window.

Two different two-door coupe models were offered. The lower-end Fairlane Club Coupe had pillars separating the door glass and rear side glass, while the higher trim level Fairlanes were pillarless two-door hardtops, similar to the convertibles.

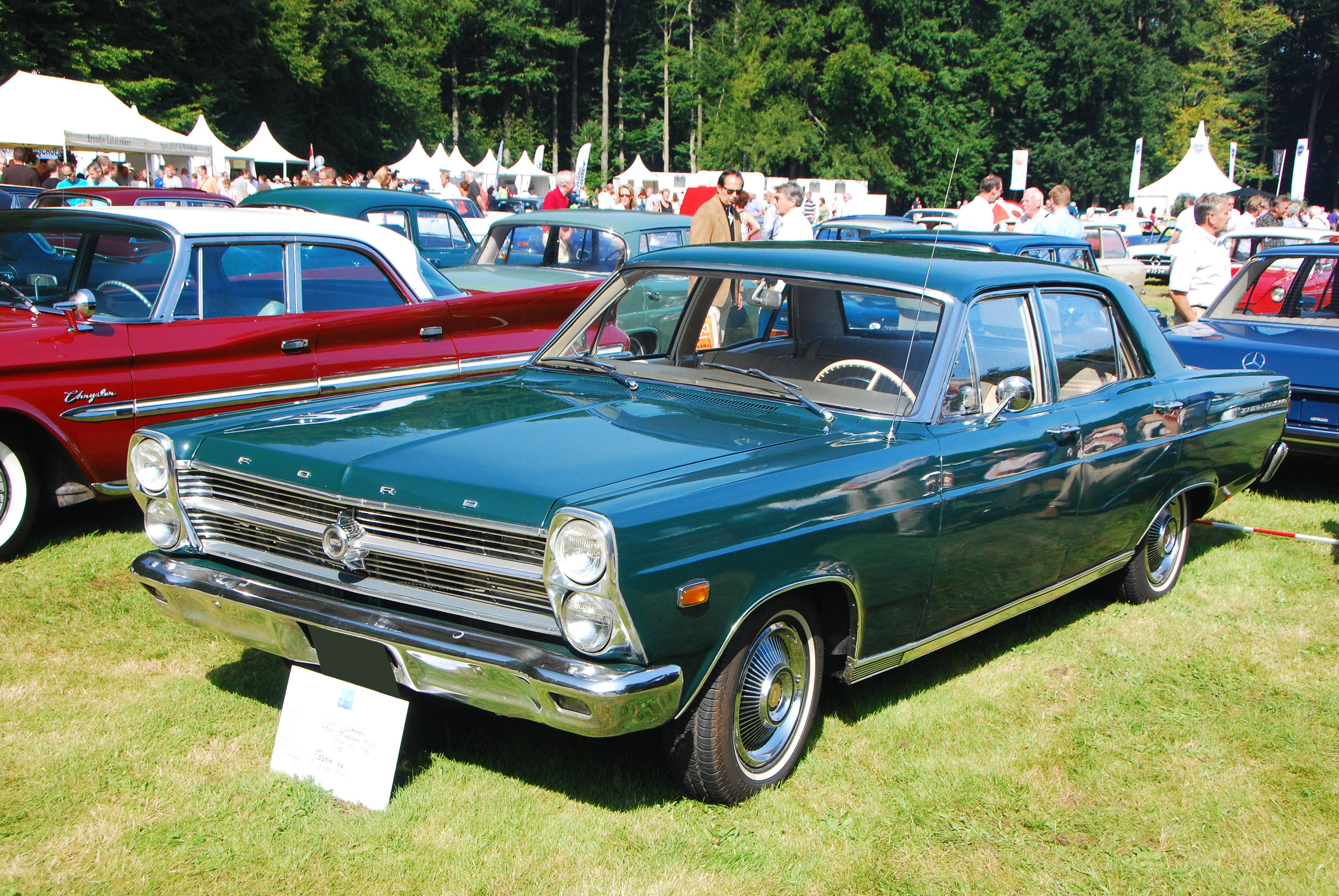
1966 Ford Fairlane 500 4-Door Sedan

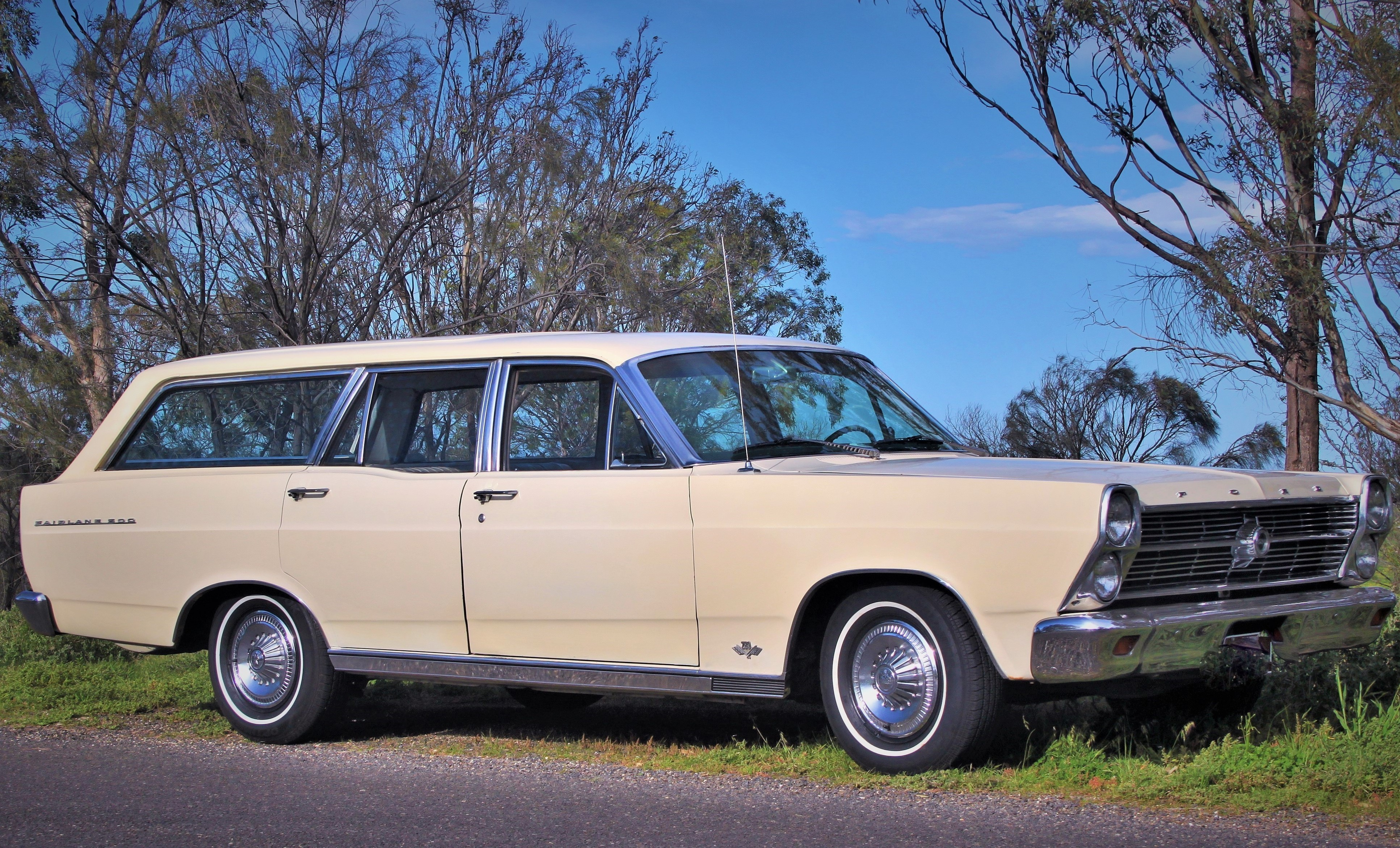
1966 Ford Fairlane 500 Wagon

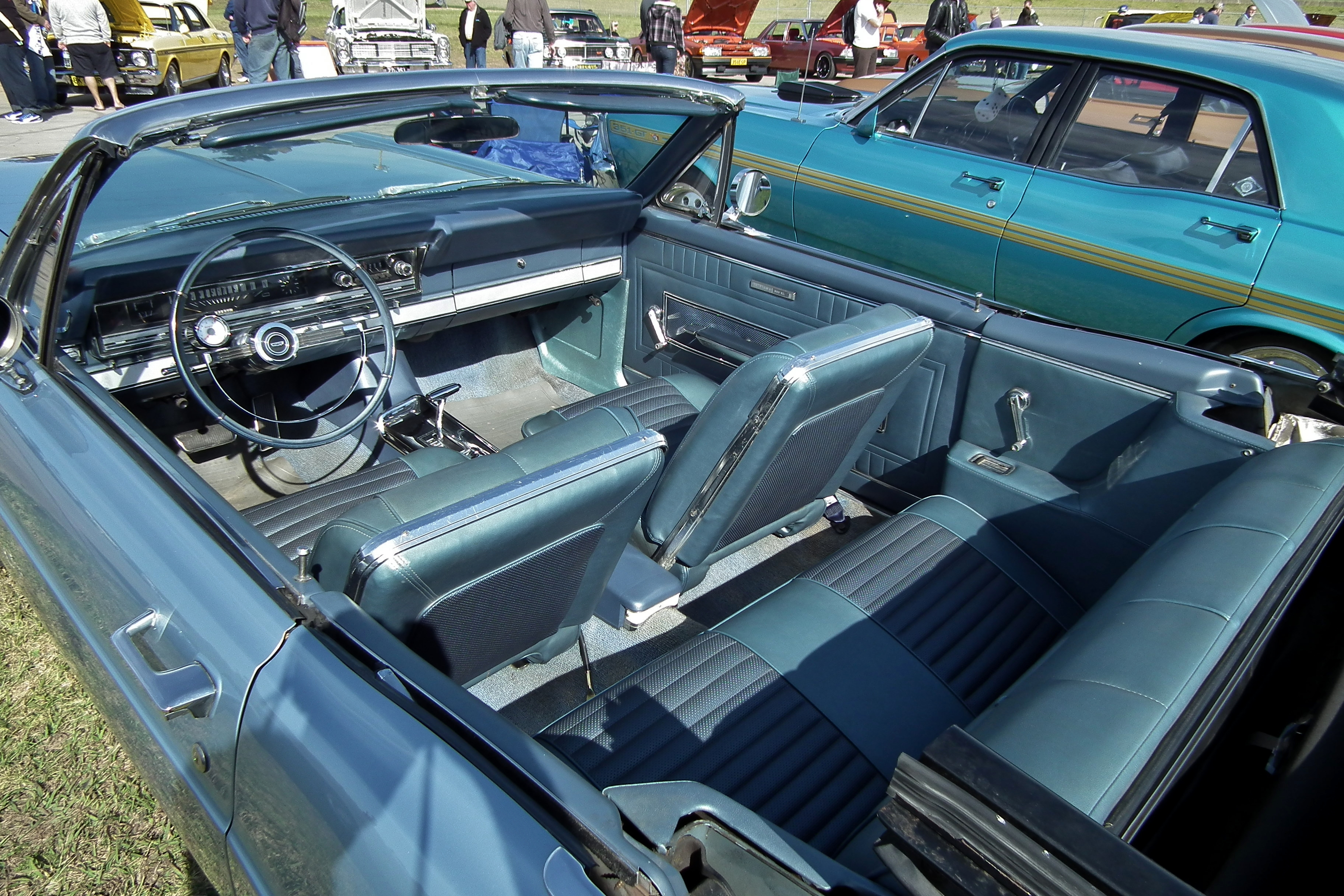
1966 Ford Fairlane 500 XL Convertible interior

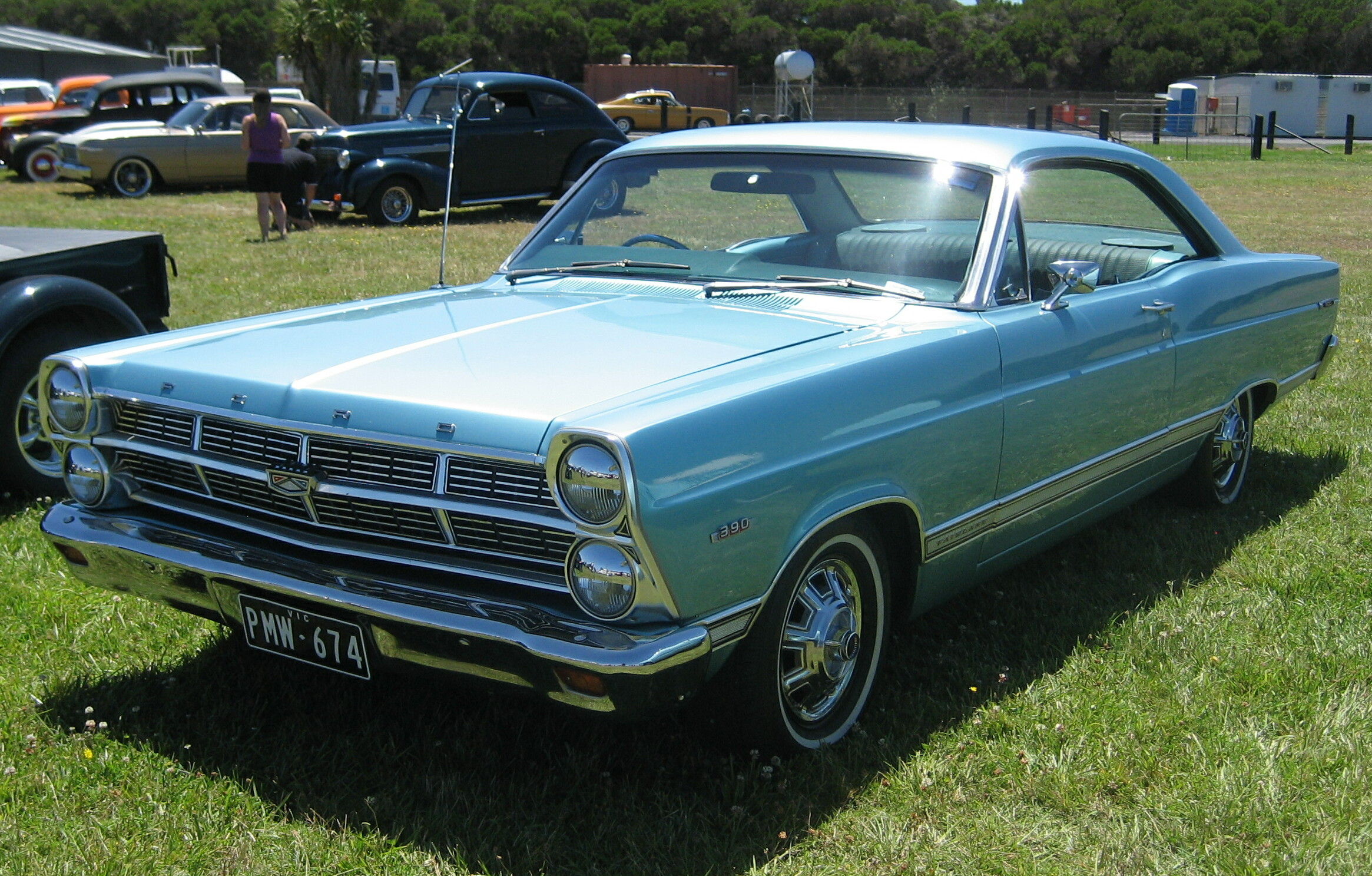
1967 Ford Fairlane 500 Hardtop

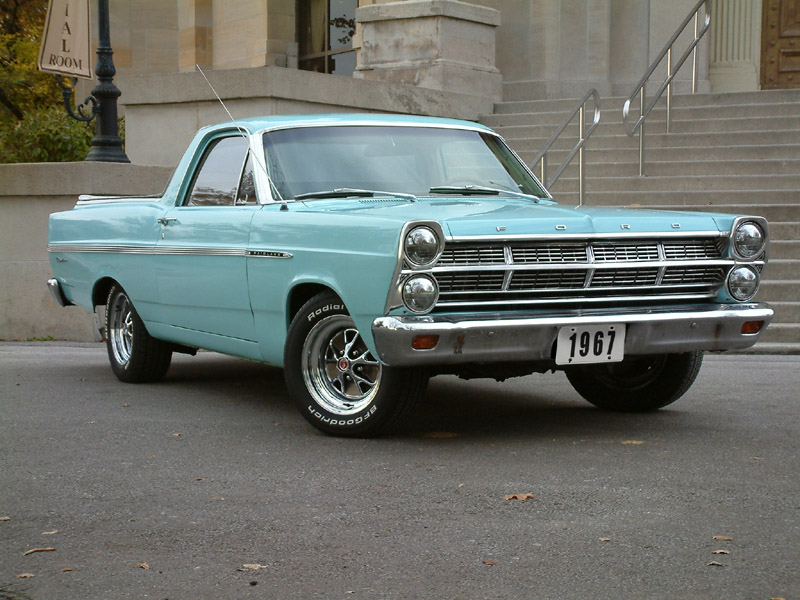
1967 Ford Fairlane Ranchero

== Sixth generation (1968–1969) ==
Sixth generation
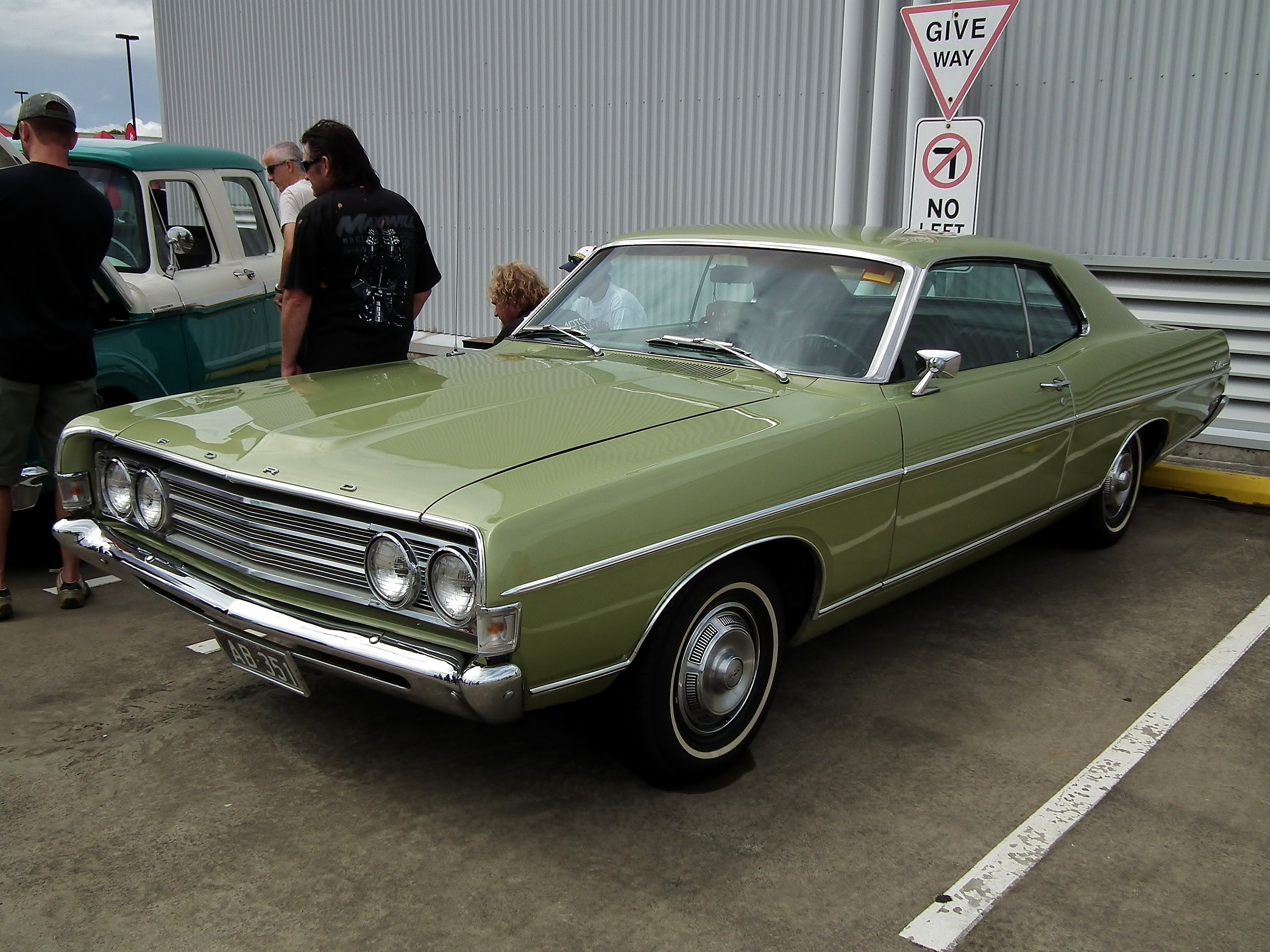
- 1969 Ford Fairlane 500 coupe

Overview
- Production: 1968–1969 (North America); 1969–1981 (Argentina)
- Assembly: Metuchen, New Jersey; Lorain, Ohio; Milpitas, California; General Pacheco, Argentina

Body and chassis
- Body style: Two-door fastback Two-door hardtop Two-door convertible Four-door sedan Four-door station wagon
- Related: Ford Torino; Ford Ranchero; Mercury Comet; Mercury Cyclone; Mercury Montego

Powertrain
- Engine: 200 cu in (3.3 L) Fairlane I6 (1968); 250 cu in (4.1 L) Fairlane I6 (1969); 289 cu in (4.7 L) Windsor V8 (1968); 302 cu in (4.9 L) Windsor V8; 351 cu in (5.8 L) Windsor V8 (1969); 390 cu in (6.4 L) Thunderbird V8; 428 cu in (7.0 L) FE V8 (1969)
- Transmission: 3/4-speed manual; 3-speed Cruise-O-Matic

Dimensions
- Wheelbase: 116.0 in (2,946 mm); 113.0 in (2,870 mm) (wagon)

A redesign was introduced for the 1968 model year, and continued the similarity to the Ford Galaxie series. The wheelbase remained at 116 in (2,946 mm), but it grew in other dimensions. They were about four inches (102 mm) longer and 200 lb (91 kg) heavier than the cars they replaced. A fastback Sportsroof model was introduced in the Fairlane 500 series, as well as a more luxurious Torino model at the top of the intermediate range, contributing 172,083 of the Fairlane's 371,787 units sold that year.

In a cost-saving decision, the station wagons carried over the 1966-67 bodies from the cowl back. The Ranch Wagon model name was deleted; Fairlane wagons had either the base or the 500 trim. Base hardtop sales more than doubled, to 44,683 units.

The base engine was the 200 cu in (3.3 L) six, with several optional V8s. Early production 1968 base V8 Fairlanes were equipped with the two-barrel 289 cu in (4.7 L), while later units came with the 302 cu in (4.9 L) unit. The GTs were part of the Torino range, with the 302 CID V8 standard, with optional engines being the 390 CID V8 in two- and four-barrel versions. The 390 four-barrel was supplanted mid-year as the top performance engine by the 428 cu in (7.0 L) Cobra Jet, developing 335 bhp (250 kW). There was also a 428 cu in (7.0 L) Super Cobra Jet. For 1969, the Fairlane 500, Ranchero, and Torino GT/GTA were also offered with the new 351W CID with a two-barrel producing 250 HP and only in the Torino GT/GTA the 351W four-barrel with 290 HP could be ordered.

The Ranchero coupe utility body style was available in standard, 500, and GT versions.

The Cobra was introduced in 1969 as a competitor for Plymouth's Road Runner. Basic models featured the 302 CID V8 and three-speed manual transmission as standard. Options included the 390 CID and two 428 cu in (7.0 L) V8s. The Cobras had a standard 428 CID V8 rated at 335 bhp (250 kW), while options included bucket seats, hood scoop, clock, tachometer, power disc brakes, and 4.30:1 rear axle gearing. "Regular" Fairlanes and Rancheros continued, all with bucket-seat options.

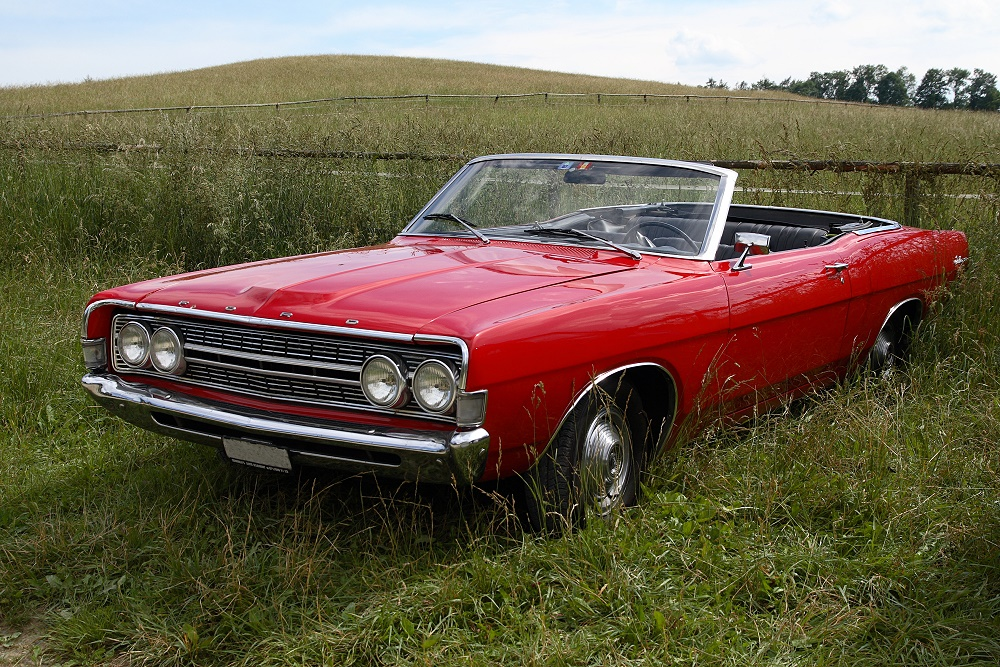
1968 Fairlane 500 convertible

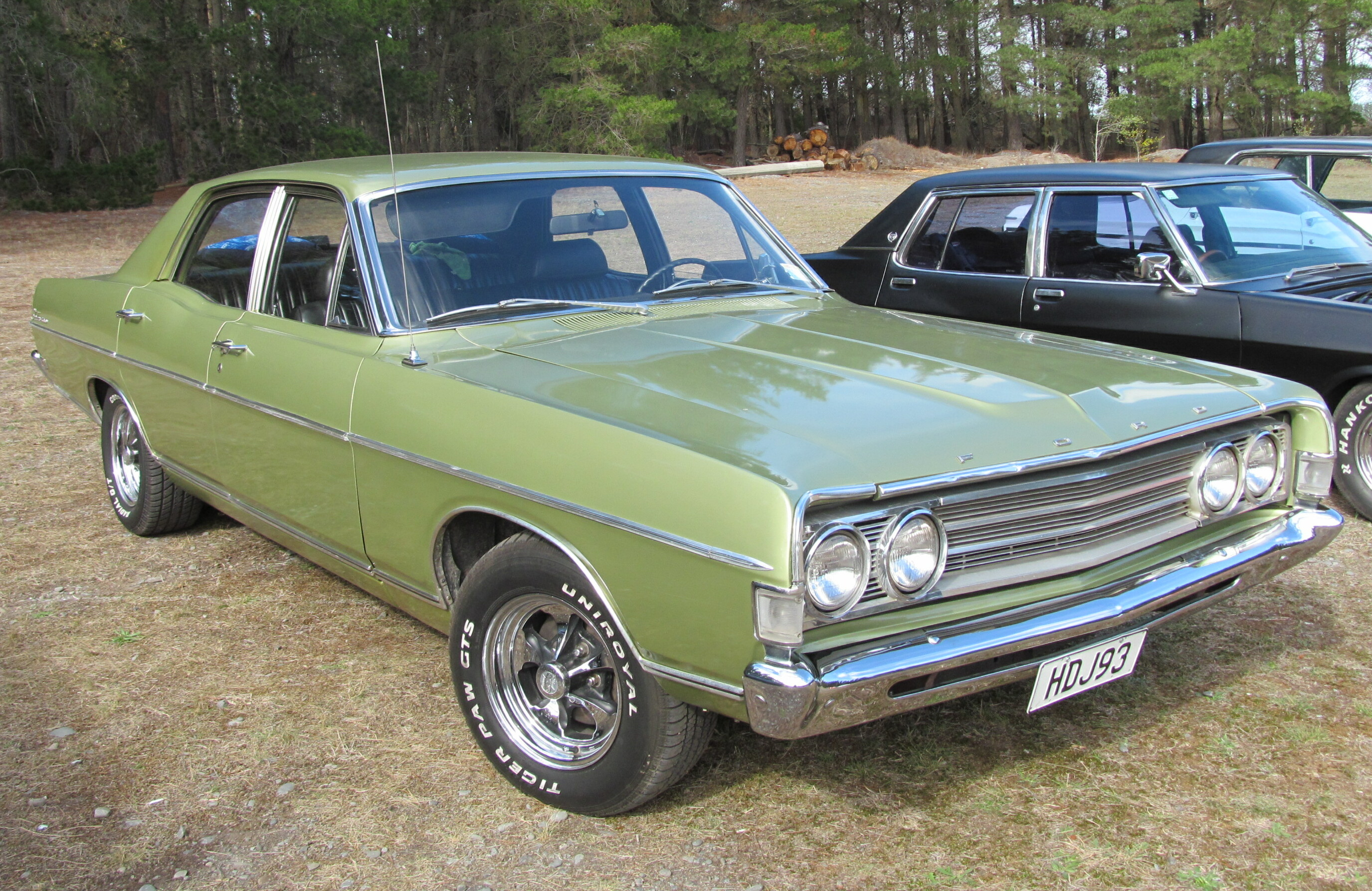
1969 Fairlane 4-door sedan

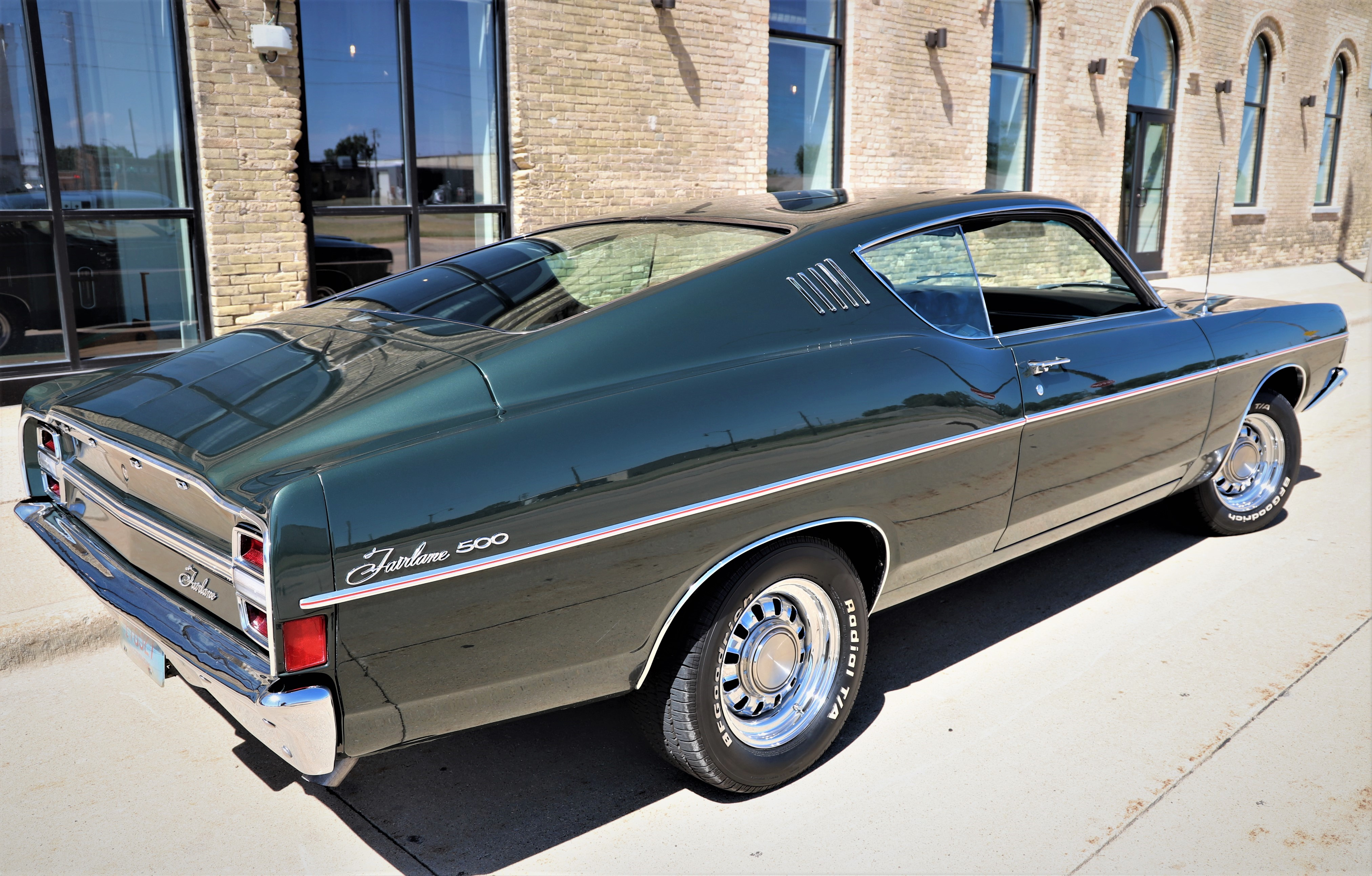
1968 Fairlane 500 Sportsroof (fastback)

== Seventh generation (1970) ==
Seventh generation
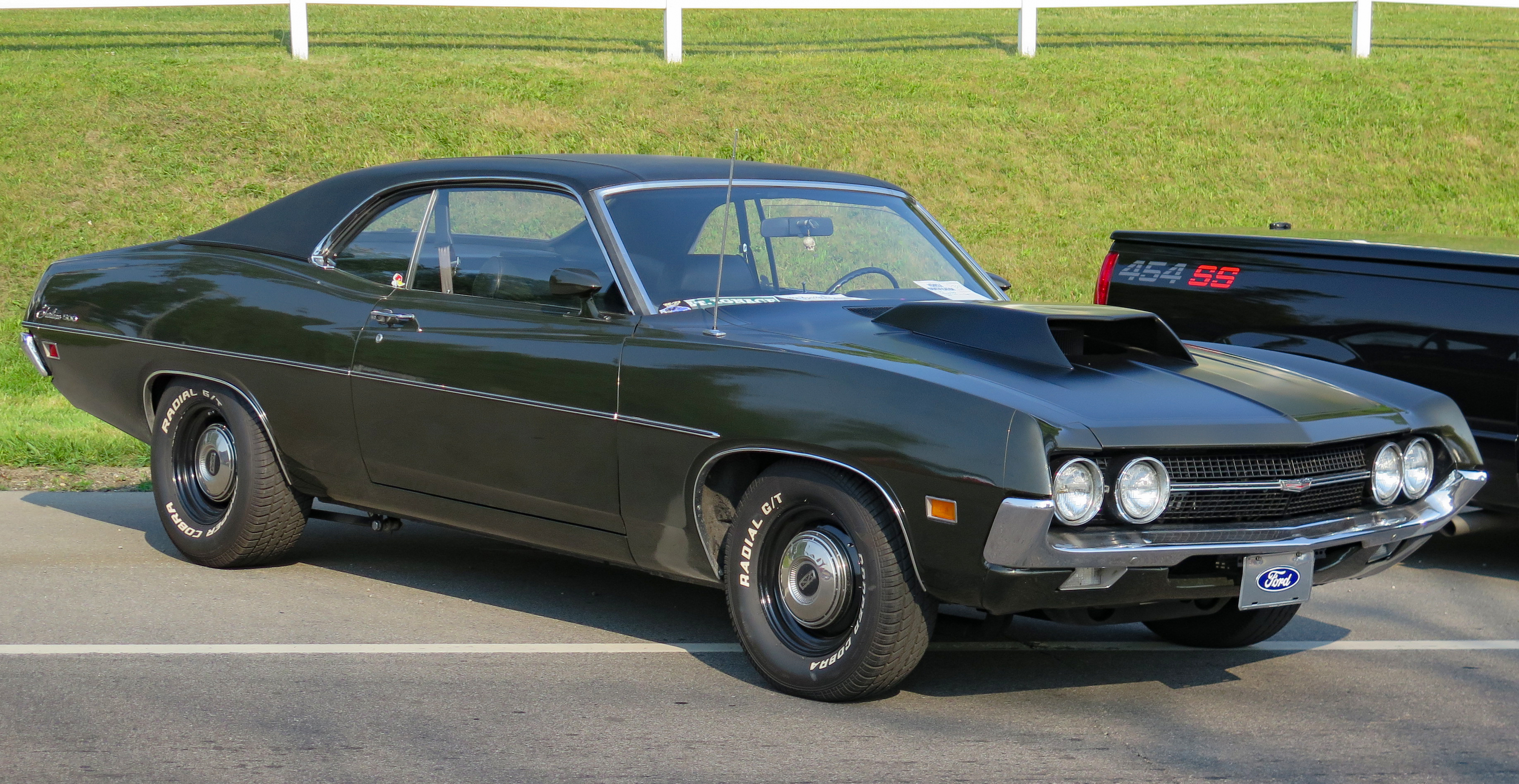
- 1970 Ford Fairlane 500

Overview
- Production: 1970
- Assembly: Metuchen, New Jersey; Lorain, Ohio; Milpitas, California

Body and chassis
- Body style: Two-door hardtop Four-door sedan Four-door station wagon
- Related: Ford Falcon; Ford Ranchero; Ford Torino; Mercury Comet; Mercury Montego

Powertrain
- Engine: 250 cu in (4.1 L) Fairlane I6; 302 cu in (4.9 L) Windsor V8; 351 cu in (5.8 L) Windsor V8; 351 cu in (5.8 L) Cleveland V8; 429 cu in (7.0 L) 385 V8
- Transmission: 3/4-speed manual; 3-speed Cruise-O-Matic

Dimensions
- Wheelbase: 117 in (2,972 mm); Wagon: 114 in (2,896 mm)

Ford's intermediates grew again in 1970, now with a 117 in (2,972 mm) wheelbase. At the start of the model year, only the Fairlane 500 remained as the base trim model in what was now effectively the Torino series.

The straight six-cylinder was the economy power, while largest engine was now a 429 cu in (7.0 L) with four-barrel carburetor and 360 bhp (270 kW). Different heads were optional and gave the Cobra 370 bhp (280 kW) and higher compression. Other options included the Cobra Jet Ram Air 429, though Ford quoted the same power output, and the Drag Pack rated at 375 bhp (280 kW). However, the 1970s were slower than the 1969s, and race teams were forced to run the older models.

The Falcon name was transferred from Ford's now discontinued (in North America) compact to a basic, even lower-trim version of the intermediate platform as a "1970 1/2" model on January 1, 1970. This series included a two-door sedan which was not available in the higher trim lines. For 1971, the Falcon and Fairlane 500 names were dropped, as all of the intermediate models took the Torino name. The Falcon and Fairlane names continued to be used in Australia through to the 21st century, while the Fairlane name continued to be used in Venezuela through 1978 on corresponding Ford Torino and LTD II models.

== Ford Fairlane in Argentina ==
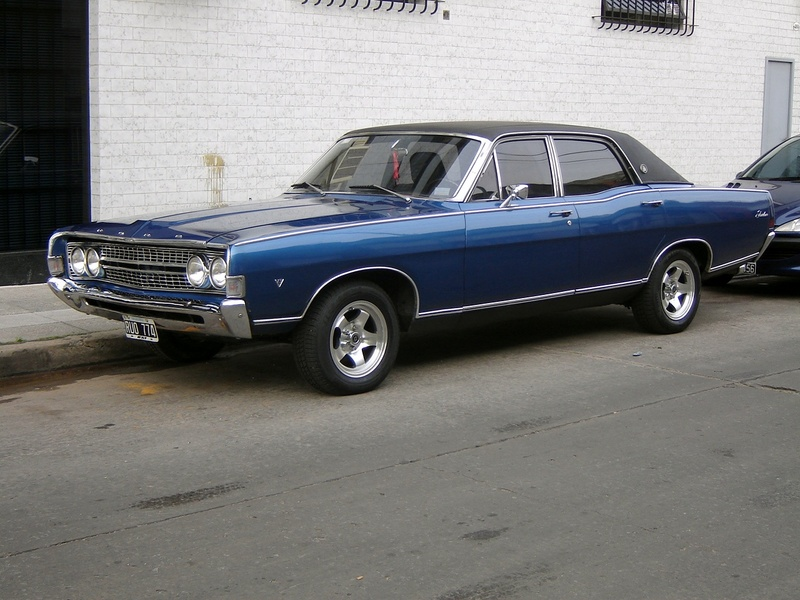
The Argentine Ford Fairlane

The four-door Fairlane sedan of the 1968 body style was built in Argentina from 1969 to 1973, followed by the 1969 body style which was built from 1973 to 1981. The Argentinian Fairlane came with three equipment packages: Standard, 500, or LTD. The car was similar to the American model except the engines: The two options were a 221 CID 6-cylinder with 132 hp (98 kW), and the old, phase I 292 CID "Y-block" V8 which had been last used in the 1964 F-Series truck; the V8 was rated at 185 hp (138 kW).

In 1971 the Ford Motor Company Argentina decided to improve the 292. The spark plugs were inclined towards the front of the engine, allowing them to be changed without removing the engine. The firing order was changede, as was the exhaust valve timing. Larger intake valves, from the Heavy Duty 292 engine used in the United States, were fitted, while the entire head and manifold was redesigned in a style very similar to that of the small block 289. The manifolds now had individual, full length runners. Buxton brand, higher compression pistons with ribbed skirts (from the 302 Windsor) were used, raising the compression ratio to 8 to 1. Claimed power was 185 hp (138 kW) at 4500 rpm. The distributorwas also redesigned. In 1978, the LTD "Elite" option was introduced as the most luxurious version to be made in Argentina. By the end of production in 1981, almost 30,000 Fairlanes had been made.

== Ford Fairlane in Venezuela ==
Ford manufactured the Torino in Venezuela marketed as the Fairlane and Fairlane 500. These cars were identical to the U.S. Torino through 1976 and both base Fairlane and upscale Fairlane 500 used the 1973–1974 Torino base model grille. For 1977–1978 the Fairlane was based on the American LTD II.

== 2005 concept ==
Ford Fairlane Concept
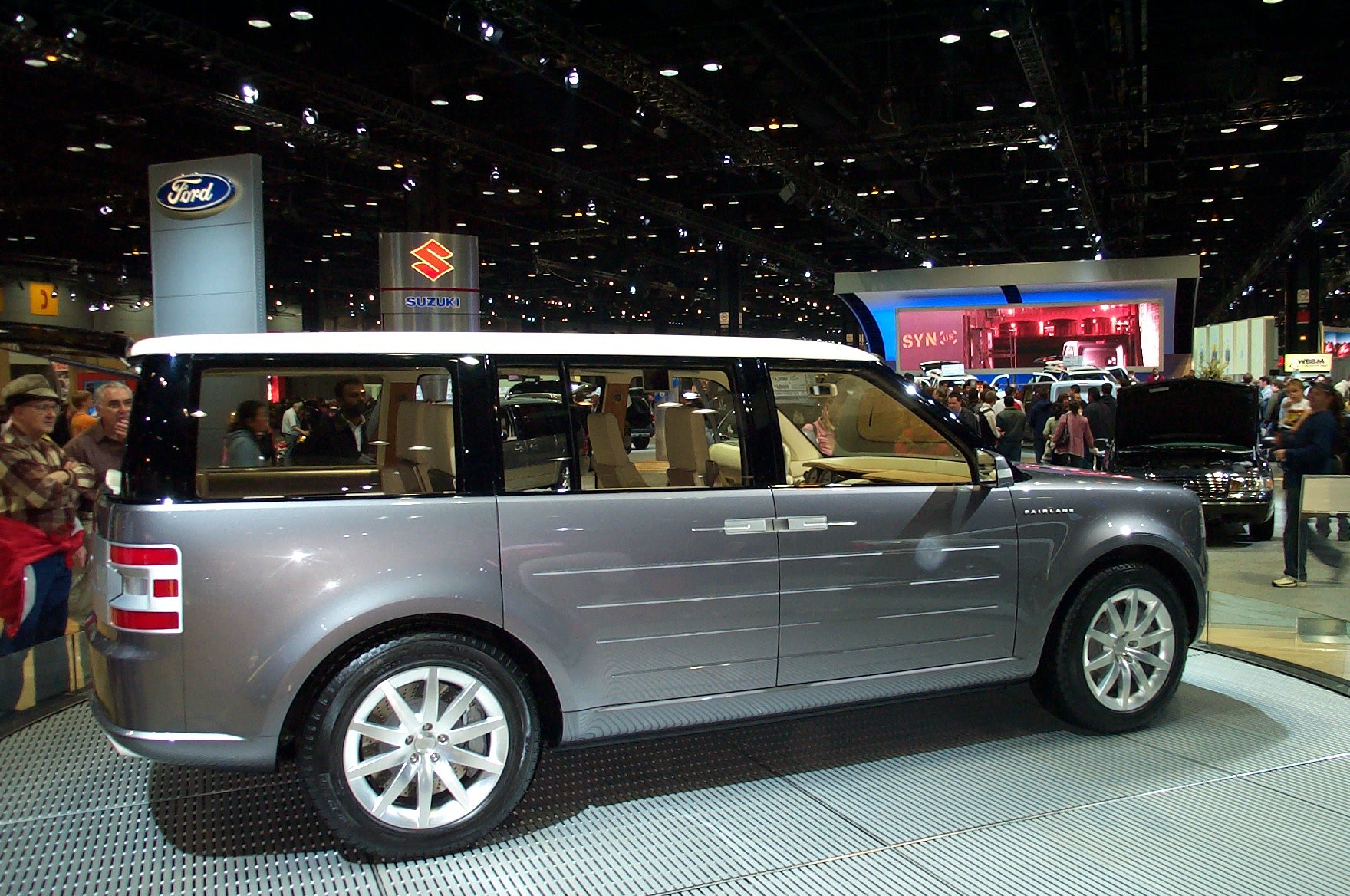
- The Ford Fairlane concept car at the 2005 Chicago Auto Show

Overview
- Production: 2005

Body and chassis
- Body style: 4-door SUV
- Layout: AWD
- Platform: Ford CD3 platform

Powertrain
- Engine: 3.0 L Duratec V6
- Transmission: 6-speed automatic

At the 2005 Auto Show circuit, Ford revealed a new concept car with the Fairlane nameplate. The "people-mover" Fairlane crossover utility vehicle concept featured three-row seating for six passengers, and previewed the chromed three-bar horizontal grille design, which also appeared on the 2006 Ford Fusion sedan and 2007 Ford Edge crossover utility vehicle."

=== Production model ===
See Ford Flex

A production version of the Fairlane concept, now called the Ford Flex, debuted at the 2007 New York Auto Show, and entered production for the 2009 model year in summer 2008. Unlike the concept, the production model comes with seven seats. It is built on the Ford D3 platform, which is also used by the Ford Taurus, and Mercury Sable. It is intended to replace the people-mover capability of the Ford Freestar minivan.
