= Edsel =

Automobile brand of the Ford Motor Company

- Type: Division
- Industry: Automotive
- Founded: November 19, 1956; 69 years ago
- Founder: Ford Motor Company
- Defunct: November 19, 1959; 66 years ago
- Fate: Dissolved after the "Edsel" model was discontinued
- Headquarters: Allen Park, Michigan, U.S.
- Area served: North America
- Key people: Richard E. Krafve (General Manager)
- Products: Automobiles
- Parent: Ford Motor Company

Edsel was a brand of automobiles produced by the Ford Motor Company from the 1958 to 1960 model years. Named after Edsel Ford, the Edsel line was developed to give Ford a fourth brand to compete with the broad selection from Chrysler and General Motors. Established as an expansion of the Lincoln–Mercury Division (re-christened Mercury–Edsel–Lincoln Division), Edsel shared a price range with Mercury and its auto bodies with both Mercury and Ford.

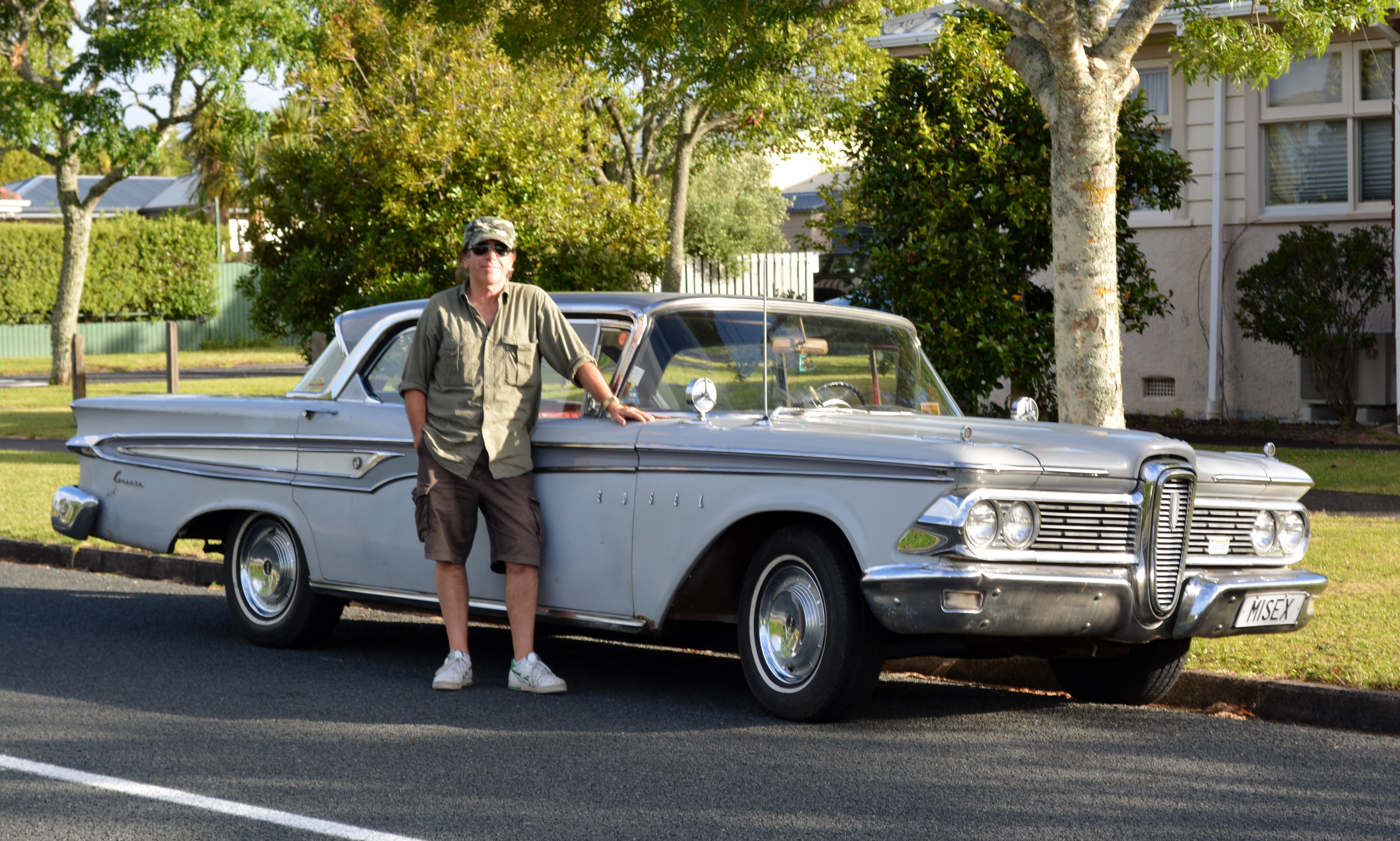
A 1959 Edsel Corsair

Competing against Buick, Oldsmobile, Pontiac, Dodge, and DeSoto, Edsel was the first new brand introduced by an American automaker since the 1939 launch of Mercury and the 1956 launch of Continental, which was soon retired and merged into Lincoln in 1957.

Ford prepared to launch the new brand with a year-long advertising campaign, marketing Edsels as the cars of the future. While 1958 Edsels introduced several advanced features which were novel for its price range, the model line became symbolic of commercial failure. Introduced in a recession that drastically reduced sales of all medium-priced cars, Edsels were considered overhyped, low quality, and unattractive, particularly the prominent vertical grille said to resemble a vagina or a horse collar.

Following a loss of over $250 million (equivalent to $2.72 billion in 2025 dollars) on development, manufacturing, and marketing, Ford discontinued the Edsel brand in November 1959, shortly after the 1960 model line was introduced.

== Background (1956–1957) ==
Ford Motor Company became a publicly traded corporation on January 17, 1956, and thus was no longer entirely owned by members of the Ford family. Freed of family control, Ford's new management was now able follow market trends in the postwar seller's market for automobiles. Comparing the company's roster of makes with that of General Motors and Chrysler, they concluded that Lincoln was competing not with Cadillac, but with Oldsmobile, Buick, and DeSoto. Ford developed a plan to move Lincoln upmarket, with the Continental broken out as a separate make at the top of Ford's product line, and to add new intermediate brands to fill the slot vacated by Lincoln.

Ford explained in 1958 that "The Edsel is new but it's actually the germination of an idea conceived by Edsel Ford who thought years ago that the company should have greater representation in the medium-price range. This idea was furthered by his son, Henry Ford II, in 1948 when another car was proposed to keep abreast of things in the automotive market."

Marketing research and development for the new intermediate line had begun in 1955 under the code name "E car", standing for "experimental car." Ford Motor Company eventually decided on the name "Edsel", in honor of Edsel Ford, son of the company's founder Henry Ford, despite objections from Edsel's son Henry Ford II. The proposed vehicle marque represented a new division, alongside the Ford and Lincoln–Mercury divisions, whose cars at the time shared the same bodies.

The company later claimed to have performed diligent, if not superior, product development and market research work in planning and designing the new vehicle. Ford assured its investors and the Detroit automotive press that Edsels were not only superior as machines to their Oldsmobile/Buick/DeSoto competition, but the their styling and specifications were guided by sophisticated market analysis and research and development, which would essentially guarantee their success.

Its elegance,
its engines,
its exciting new features,
make other cars
seem ordinary

— Edsel advertisement, 1957

In November 1956, the Edsel Division of Ford Motor Company opened a retail organization and dealer network, alongside its Ford and Lincoln–Mercury dealerships. The Continental Division had ceased to exist several months earlier. With a network of 1,187 Edsel dealers, Ford Motor Company now had approximately 10,000 dealerships among its three divisions, bringing it closer to Chrysler, with 10,000 dealers across five brands, and General Motors, with 16,000 across six brands.

=== Edsel name etymology ===
Edsel takes its name from Edsel Ford, son of Henry Ford and Ford company president from 1919 until his 1943 death. Once the "E car" began development, "Edsel" was proposed as a brand name, but was strongly opposed by the Ford family. Ford president/CEO Henry Ford II declared he "did not want his father's good name spinning around on thousands of hubcaps". Internal studies were started to come up with a name that would win the approval of company leadership, as well as seeking the opinion of the public, standing outside movie theaters to poll audiences on their several proposals. No conclusion was reached.

The company tuned to the advertising firm Foote, Cone & Belding. The agency issued a report citing over 6,000 possible names, causing Ford chairman Ernest Breech to complain that they had been hired to develop one name. Early favorites names included Citation, Corsair, Pacer, and Ranger; all four were ultimately chosen for the Edsel sedan lines, and each saw further use elsewhere in the American auto industry. David Wallace, Ford manager of marketing research, and coworker Bob Young unofficially consulted freethinker poet Marianne Moore, who made creative suggestions such as "Utopian Turtletop", "Pastelogram", "Turcotinga" "Resilient Bullet", "Andante con Moto", and "Mongoose Civique". (Note: Among Moore's suggestions was "Chaparral", which coincidentally was used for a make of race cars starting in 1962.)

At the urging of Ernest Breech, acting as chair of a board meeting in the absence of Henry Ford II, the name Edsel was finally selected. Overruling the founder's grandson, the board decided to imitate the naming tradition of the original Ford brand and its competitors Buick (David Dunbar Buick), Oldsmobile (Ransom E. Olds), Dodge (John and Horace Dodge), and Chrysler (Walter Chrysler).

== History ==
Edsels were introduced amid considerable publicity on "E Day", September 4, 1957. They were promoted by a top-rated television special, The Edsel Show, on October 13, but the promotional effort soon wilted under the adverse public reaction to the Edsel's styling and unconventional build.

The next day, Ford's stock declined by a point, with the new Edsel described as a "reborn LaSalle", a 1927-40 General Motors brand. For months, Ford had assured the industry press that its market research was certain of the great demand for the "entirely new kind of car" their publicity had promised. In reality, Edsels shared their engineering and bodywork with other Ford models, and the similarities were apparent once the vehicles were viewed firsthand.

=== 1958 ===
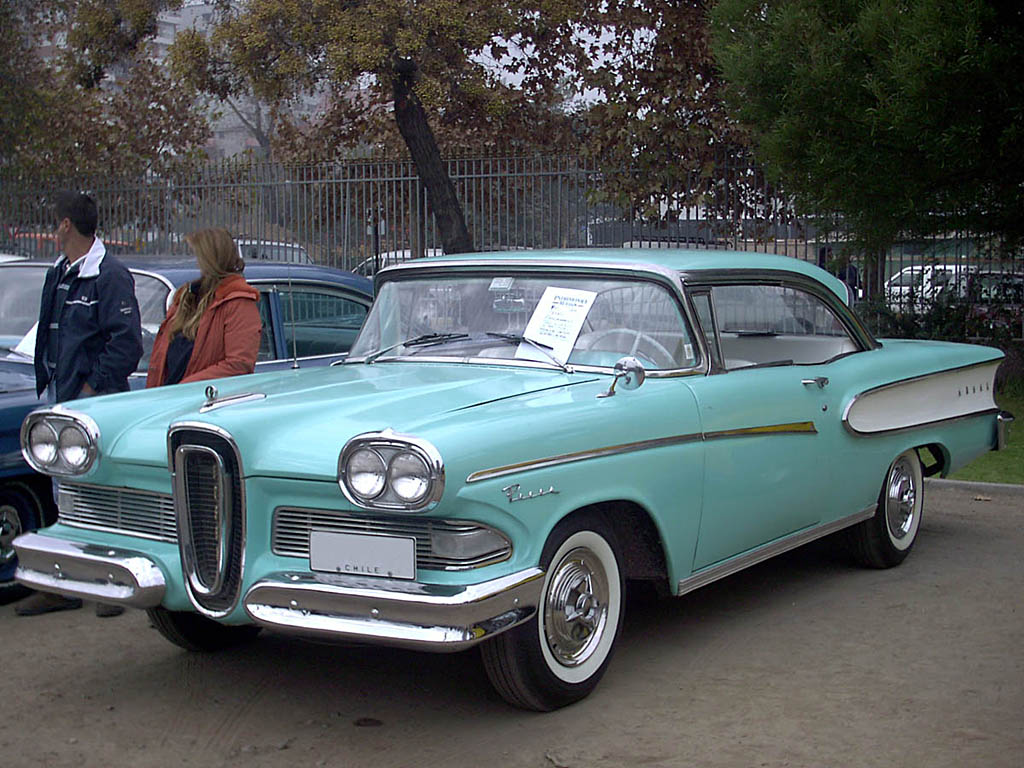
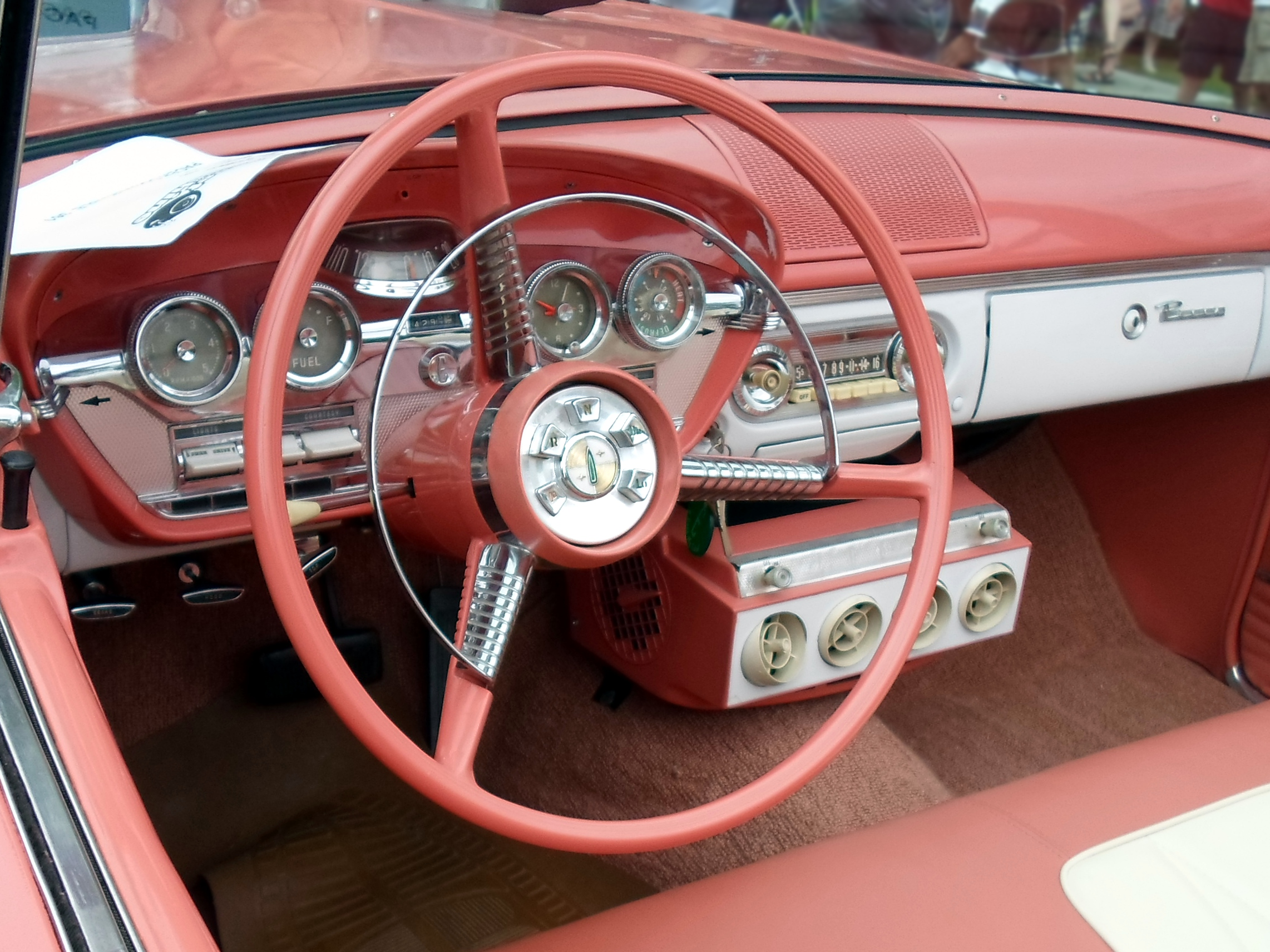
(Left): A 1958 Edsel Pacer two-door hardtop. (right): An Edsel Pacer interior, showing the Teletouch system and Rolling Dome speedometer

For its inaugural model year, Edsel introduced a seven-model product line, including four sedans and three station wagons. The lower-trim sedans included the Edsel Ranger and Edsel Pacer (Ford Fairlane-based) and the higher-trim Edsel Corsair and Edsel Citation (sharing bodies with the Mercury Monterey). Derived from Ford station wagons, the two-door Edsel Roundup and the four-door Edsel Villager and wood-trimmed Edsel Bermuda completed the line.

The line introduced several design innovations. In place of a horizontal strip or round dial, Edsel used a rotating dome for a speedometer. Imitating aircraft, the dashboard adopted warning lights for conditions such as low oil level, parking brake engaged, and engine overheating. As a predecessor to cruise control, Edsel introduced warning light on the speedometer if the driver exceeded a preset speed limit. While a standard column-mounted transmission shifter was offered, an alternative option was a new Teletouch push-button shifting system mounted in the steering wheel hub.

Edsel vehicles included many elements of the Ford Lifeguard safety package, including optional seatbelts, a deep-dish steering wheel, double-latched doors, and childproof rear door locks. They were among the first to introduce a remote-operated trunk latch and self-adjusting brakes.

In the first year, 63,110 Edsels were sold in the United States, and 4,935 in Canada. Though below expectations, this represented the second-largest launch for any new car brand to date, exceeded only by the DeSoto in 1929. One four-door Edsel Citation was purchased in October 1957 and deliverd to the United Kingdom for Ian Russell, 13th Duke of Bedford.

In January 1958, the free-standing Edsel division was merged with Lincoln–Mercury, with the re-christened Mercury–Edsel–Lincoln Division (M–E–L) conducting Edsel sales and marketing operations. As the model year progressed and sales fell below expectations, multiple Edsel-only dealers closed or expanded their brand offerings with the company's encouragement, including Lincoln–Mercury or imported Ford of Britain and Ford of Germany franchises.

=== 1959 ===
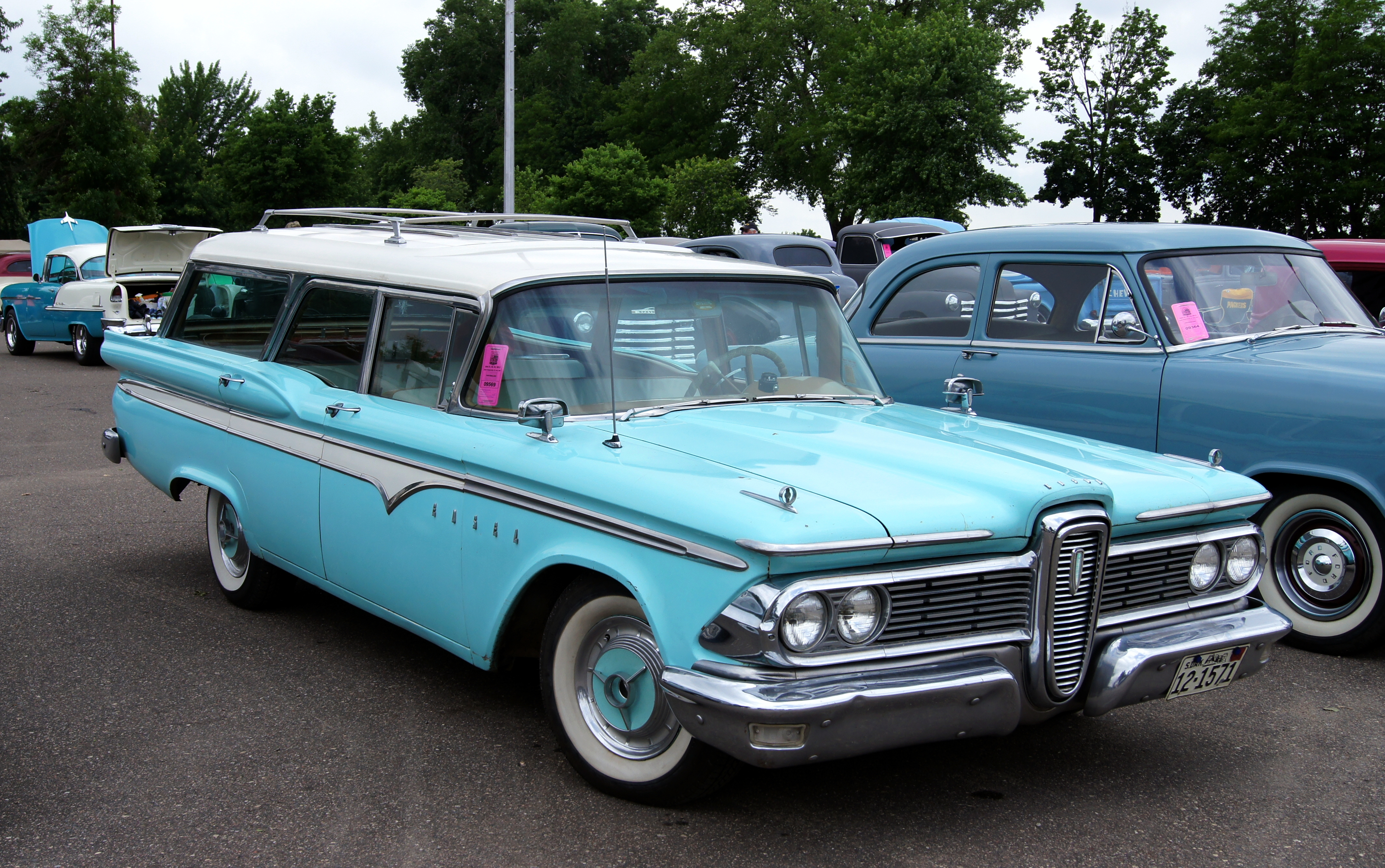
A 1959 Edsel Villager

For the 1959 model year, Ford's general sales manager announced the "repositioning of Edsel in the lower price field" and Ford's promotional literature noted that "Edsel is now priced down with many models of Chevrolet, Plymouth, and Ford." M-E-L made several corresponding changes to Edsel, withdrawing Mercury-based Edsel models. The Citation and the Pacer were discontinued, with the Corsair taking the place of the latter (now sharing bodies with the Ranger). The Edsel Villager became the sole Edsel station wagon. Though Edsel sedans all used a Ford body, they moved to a 120-inch wheelbase for 1959 (2 inches longer than Ford).

In mid-1959, Ford introduced the Ford Galaxie as a higher-trim version of the Fairlane 500; no Edsel equivalent of the Galaxie was introduced, further eroding its appeal as a medium-price automobile.

==== 1959 changes ====
In response to the widely negative market reception to the 1958 Edsel exterior design, the 1959 Edsels toned down the novelty. While the vertical center grille returned (de-emphasized with flush-mounted grille trim), a flattened hood repositioned the headlamps into a full-width grille, along with a larger front bumper fitting much closer to the grille. The rear enlarged and lowered the taillamp housings; in contrast to the Ford Fairlane, Edsel sedans did not have tailfins.

To increase its resemblance to Ford models, Edsel dropped several interior features, though it retained the distinct interior trim. The rotating-dome speedometer was discontinued, along with the unreliable Teletouch steering-wheel transmission control; however the optional climate control and padded dashboard continued. In contrast to Ford, the Edsel Corsair was fitted with a 70/30 split-bench seatback. While the seat base was full-width, the design was a forerunner of the 50/50 "Twin Comfort Lounge Seats" introduced in the 1967 Ford LTD; in various forms, the design was used until the 2012 Ford Crown Victoria.

In 1959, Edsel sold only 44,891 vehicles in the United States and 2,505 in Canada.

=== 1960 ===
On the verge of cancellation, Edsel saw its 1960 model line reduced solely to the Ranger and Villager. While largely orphaned in its market position, Edsel was again derived from Ford, sharing in its 1960 redesign. Sharing nearly its entire body with the redesigned Ford Galaxie, the 1960 Edsel shed its symbolic vertical grille for a split eggcrate grille closely resembling the 1959 Pontiac; for the first time, a full-width front bumper was used. The Ranger gained tailfins for the first time (previously only used on Edsel wagons), with Edsels distinguished from Fords by four oblong vertical taillamps.

Distinguished primarily by their grille and taillamps, the 1960 Edsels were fitted with model-specific hoods, bumpers, and body-side trim. The four-door Ranger hardtop had no direct Ford equivalent, as it combined the roofline of the Fairlane with the doors of the Galaxie. The two-door hardtop shared its body with the Ford Galaxie Starliner, minus the star emblems on the "C" pillar. In a design advance, the muffler was relocated from below the passenger compartment to the rear of the car, intended for better muffler protection and less heat and noise intrusion to the passenger compartment.

The 1960 Edsels were produced between October 15 and November 19, 1959. In total, 2,846 vehicles were produced at the Louisville Assembly in addition to pilot prototypes.

==== Discontinuation ====
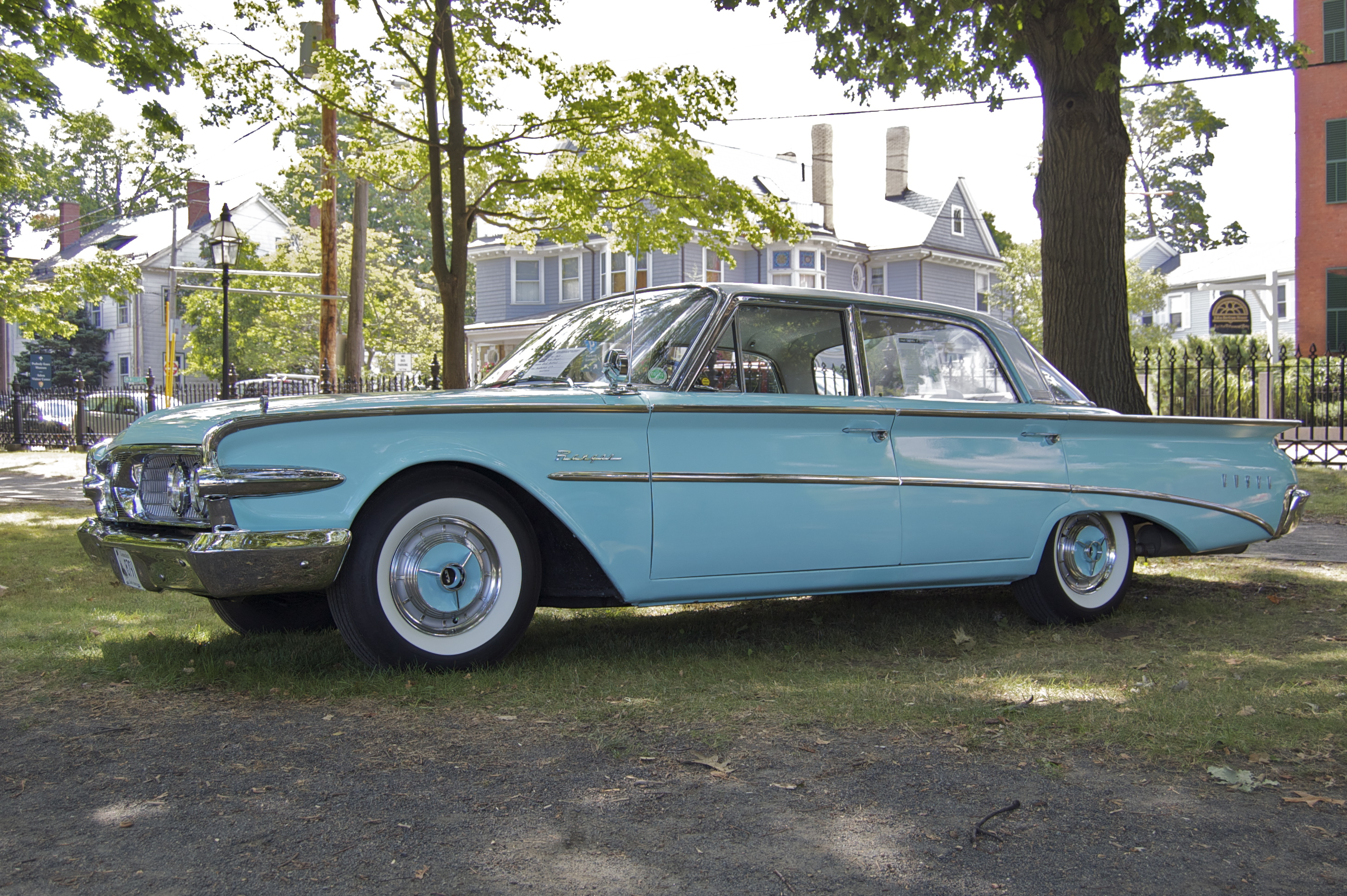
A 1960 Edsel Ranger sedan

Ford announced the end of the Edsel brand on November 19, 1959. Production continued until late November.

Total Edsel sales from September 1957 to November 1959 were approximately 116,000, less than half the projected break-even point. The company lost $350 million on the venture, the equivalent of $3 billion in 2025 dollars. Only 118,287 Edsels were built, including 7,440 produced in Oakville, Ontario, Canada. By U.S. auto industry standards, these were paltry production figures over three years.

On November 20, 1959, United Press International reported that immediately following the termination announcement, book values for used Edsels had declined by as much as $400. To offset the decreased values for customers who had purchased 1960 models or carryover 1959 models prior to the announcement, Ford announced it would distribute coupons valued at $300 to $400 toward the purchase of new Ford products. In some newspaper markets, dealers scrambled to renegotiate newspaper advertising contracts for the 1960 Edsel models, while others dropped the name from their dealerships' advertising entirely. The company issued credits to dealers for stock unsold or received following the announcement.

== Models ==
=== Edsel sedans ===
For its 1958 introduction, Edsel was created with a "two-tier" model range of four sedan lines. The lower-trim Edsel Ranger and Edsel Pacer shared bodies with Ford Fairlane sedans (118-inch (300 cm) wheelbase) while the higher-trim Edsel Corsair and Edsel Citation shared bodies with the Mercury Monterey and Mercury Montclair sedans (124-inch (310 cm) wheelbase). The Ranger was offered as either a two-door or four-door sedan or hardtop while the Pacer was offered as a two-door convertible and two-door and four-door hardtop (and sedan). The Corsair was offered solely as a two-door and four-door hardtop, and the Citation was offered as a two-door and four-door hardtop and a two-door convertible.

For 1959, Edsel dropped the Pacer and Citation and moved the Corsair to a Ford-based chassis. The Corsair lineup added a convertible and four-door sedan (essentially the same as the discontinued Pacer), becoming the flagship model line.

For 1960, Edsel dropped the Corsair, leaving only the Ranger. For its final year, the Ranger remained offered in a full range of body styles, including pillared sedans, hardtops, and a two-door convertible.

=== Edsel station wagons ===
In line with Ford and Mercury, Edsel created a distinct model range of station wagon lines, with all three model lines derived from a Ford chassis; Edsel station wagons were distinguished by standard two-tone exterior paintwork on all models. Sharing its body and 116-inch (290 cm) wheelbase with Ford station wagons, the Edsel wagon line included the two-door Edsel Roundup and the four-door Edsel Villager and Edsel Bermuda.

Sharing much of its body with the Ford Ranch Wagon, the two-door Edsel Roundup was offered only as a six-passenger vehicle with sliding rear side windows. The four-door Edsel Villager (derived from the Ford Country Sedan) was the station wagon counterpart of the Ranger and was offered with either six or nine-passenger interiors. The Edsel Bermuda (derived from both the Ford Country Sedan and Country Squire) was the station wagon counterpart of the Pacer and offered with either six or nine-passenger interiors; its exterior wood paneling lent it a "three-tone" exterior appearance.

For 1959, the Roundup and Bermuda were dropped, leaving the Villager (which outsold the other two combined by a large margin) as the sole station wagon line. For 1960, the Villager was redesigned alongside the Ranger, again derived from the Ford Country Sedan.

Model name	Years produced	Type	Divisional counterpart	Notes
Ford-based Edsels
Edsel Ranger	1958–1960	2-door convertible 2-door sedan 4-door sedan 2-door hardtop 4-door hardtop	Ford Fairlane	Namesake of Ford Ranger pickup truck Convertible sold only for 1960
Edsel Pacer	1958	2-door convertible 2-door hardtop 4-door sedan 4-door hardtop	Ford Galaxie	Namesake of AMC Pacer hatchback
Edsel Corsair	1959	2-door convertible 2-door hardtop 4-door sedan 4-door hardtop	Ford Galaxie	Namesake of Lincoln Corsair CUV Adopted Ford chassis for 1959.
Mercury-based Edsels
Edsel Corsair	1958	2-door hardtop 4-door hardtop	Mercury Montclair	Namesake of Lincoln Corsair CUV Sold only as hardtop.
Edsel Citation	1958	2-door convertible 2-door hardtop 4-door hardtop	Mercury Turnpike Cruiser	Namesake of Chevrolet Citation compact
Edsel station wagons (Ford-based)
Edsel Roundup	1958	3-door station wagon	Ford Ranch Wagon	Sliding rear side windows Two-row seating
Edsel Villager	1958–1960	5-door station wagon	Ford Country Sedan	Namesake of wood-panel Mercury station wagons Namesake of Mercury Villager minivan Two-tone exterior; two or three-row seating
Edsel Bermuda	1958	5-door station wagon	Ford Country Squire	Three-tone exterior (including standard wood paneling) Two or three-row seating

== Edsel's failure ==
Historians have advanced several theories in an effort to explain Edsel's failure. Popular culture often faults vehicle styling. Consumer Reports has alleged that poor workmanship was Edsel's chief problem. Marketing experts hold Edsels up as a supreme example of the corporate culture's failure to understand American consumers. Business analysts cite the weak internal support for the product inside Ford's executive offices. According to author and Edsel scholar Jan Deutsch, an Edsel was "the wrong car at the wrong time."

=== "The aim was right, but the target moved" ===
Edsels are most notorious as a marketing disaster. The name became synonymous with the real-life commercial failure of a predicted "sure-fire" product idea. Similar ill-fated products have often been mocked as "Edsels". Ford's own Sierra model, launched almost 25 years later, is often compared to Edsel owing to initial buyer antipathy to its radical styling, though it ultimately became a sales success. The Edsel's spectacular failure became a proverbial illustration of how not to market a product.

The Edsel's failure was shocking because Ford believed success was certain until after the cars had been designed and built, the dealerships established, and $400 million spent for development, advertising and launch. The company had invested $400 million, equivalent to well over $4 billion in 21st century dollars, but despite their claims, there had been no serious study of the product's market feasibility.

The pre-release advertising campaign promoted the cars as having "more YOU ideas". Teaser advertisements in magazines revealed only glimpses of the cars through a blurred lens or under tarps. Ford never test marketed the vehicles or their radical styling concepts with potential buyers. The cars were shipped to dealers under wraps, and remained so on the dealer lot until the full launch.

The public had difficulty placing the prestige of the Edsel because Ford made the mistake of pricing Edsels within Mercury's market price segment. Edsels were conceived to fit into Ford's marketing structure as a mid-price model between Ford and Mercury. However, when the cars debuted in September 1957, the least expensive Ranger was priced within $74 of the most expensive and best-trimmed Ford sedan, and $63 less than Mercury's base Medalist model. In their mid-range pricing, Edsel's Pacer and Corsair models were more expensive than their ostensibly higher-range Mercury counterparts. Edsel's top-of-the-line Citation hardtop sedan was the only model priced to correctly compete with Mercury's mid-range Montclair Turnpike Cruiser, as seen in the chart below. Edsel products were priced from $2,484 (equivalent to $27,033 in 2025) to $3,766 (equivalent to $40,985 in 2025).

1958 Ford Motor Company pricing (FOB) structure
Ford	Edsel	Mercury	Lincoln
			Capri $4,803–$4,951
			Continental $4,802–$4,927
			Premiere $4,334–$4,798
		Park Lane $4,280–$4,405	
	Citation $3,500–$3,766	Montclair $3,236–$3,597	
	Corsair $3,311–$3,390		
	Pacer $2,700–$2,993	Monterey $2,652–$3,081	
Galaxie 500 $2,410–$3,138	Ranger $2,484–$2,643	Medalist $2,547–$2,617	
Fairlane 500 $2,196–$2,407			
Custom 300 $1,977–$2,119			

Not only was Edsel competing against its own sister divisions, but model for model, buyers did not understand what the cars were supposed to be—a step above the Mercury, or a step below it.

After introduction to the public, Edsels did not live up to their preproduction publicity, even though many new features were offered, such as self-adjusting rear brakes and automatic lubrication. While Ford's market research had indicated that these and other features would make Edsels attractive to them as car buyers, their selling prices exceeded what buyers were willing to pay. Upon seeing the price for a base model, many potential buyers simply left the dealerships. Other customers were frightened by the price for a fully equipped top-of-the-line model.

=== "The wrong car at the wrong time" ===
One of the external forces working against the Edsel brand was the onset of an economic recession in late 1957.

Compounding Edsel's problems was that the car had to compete with well-established nameplates from the Big Three such as Pontiac, Oldsmobile, Buick, Dodge, and DeSoto, as well as with its sister division Mercury, which had never been a stellar sales success. To make matters worse, as a new make, Edsel had no established brand loyalty with buyers as its competing makes had.

Even if the 1957–1958 recession had not occurred, Edsel would have been entering a shrinking marketplace. In the early 1950s, when the "E" car was in its earliest stages of development, Ford Executive Vice President Ernest R. Breech had convinced Ford management that the medium-priced market segment offered great untapped opportunity. At the time, Breech's assessment was basically correct. In 1955, Pontiac, Buick, and Dodge sold a combined two million units. However, by the fall of 1957, when Edsels were introduced, the market had changed drastically. Independent manufacturers in the medium-priced field were drifting to insolvency.

Hoping to reverse its losses, Packard acquired Studebaker, which was also in financial difficulty. The board decided to stop production under the venerable Packard badge after 1958. The 1957–58 Packards were Studebaker bodied cars using much Packard styling, also known as "Packardbakers". Attempting to capitalize on the emerging consumer interest in economy cars, American Motors shifted its focus to its compact Rambler models and discontinued its pre-merger brands, Nash and Hudson, after the 1957 model year. Sales of Chrysler's DeSoto marque dropped dramatically from its 1957 high by over 50% in 1958. When DeSoto sales failed to rebound during the 1959 model year, plans were made in Highland Park to discontinue the nameplate by 1961.

Despite the presence and influence of the "whiz kids" in the Ford hierarchy and upon this car, the project epitomized the hazards of design by committee.

Sales for most car manufacturers, even those not introducing new models, were down. Among domestic makes, only Rambler and Lincoln produced more cars in 1958 than in 1957. Customers started buying more fuel-efficient automobiles, particularly Volkswagen Beetles, which were selling at rates exceeding 50,000 a year in the U.S. from 1957 onward. Edsels were equipped with powerful engines and offered brisk acceleration, but they also required premium fuel, and their fuel economy, especially in city driving, was poor even by late-1950s standards.

Ford Motor Company had conducted the right marketing study, but it came up with the wrong product to fill the gap between Ford and Mercury. By 1958, buyers had become fascinated with economy cars, and a large car like an Edsel was seen as too expensive to buy and own. When Ford introduced the Falcon in 1959, it sold over 400,000 units in its first year. Ford's investment in expanded plant capacity and additional tooling for Edsels helped make the company's subsequent success with the Falcon possible.

By 1965, the market for medium-priced cars had recovered, and this time, Ford had the right car, the Galaxie 500 LTD. The LTD's success led Chevrolet to introduce the Caprice as a mid-1965 upscale trim option on its top-of-the-line Impala four-door hardtop.

=== Reliability ===
Even though Edsels shared basic technology with other Ford cars of the era, a number of issues caused reliability problems, mostly with the 1958 models. Reports of mechanical flaws with the cars surfaced, due primarily to lack of quality control and confusion of parts with other Ford models. Ford never dedicated a stand-alone factory solely to Edsel model production. The 1958 Edsels were assembled in both Mercury and Ford factories. The longer-wheelbase models, Citation and Corsair, were produced alongside the Mercury products. The shorter-wheelbase models, Pacer and Ranger, were produced alongside Ford products.

Workers assembling Fords and Mercurys often found the task of assembling the occasional Edsel that moved down the production line burdensome, because it required them to change tools and parts bins, then switch back to resume assembling Fords or Mercurys after completing assembly on Edsels. The workers were also expected to accommodate Edsel assembly with no adjustment in their hourly quota of Ford and Mercury production. Consequently, the desired quality control of the different Edsel models proved difficult to achieve, even when the Fords and Mercurys were satisfactorily assembled on the same lines. Many Edsels actually left the assembly lines unfinished. Uninstalled parts were placed in the trunks along with installation instructions for dealership mechanics, some of whom never installed the additional parts at all. Some dealers did not even receive all the parts.

In the March 1958 issue of Popular Mechanics, 16% of Edsel owners reported poor workmanship, with complaints ranging from faulty welding to power steering failure. In its test car, Popular Mechanics tested for these problems and discovered others, notably a badly leaking trunk during rain, and the odometer showing fewer than actual miles traveled.

=== Design controversies ===
==== Body design ====
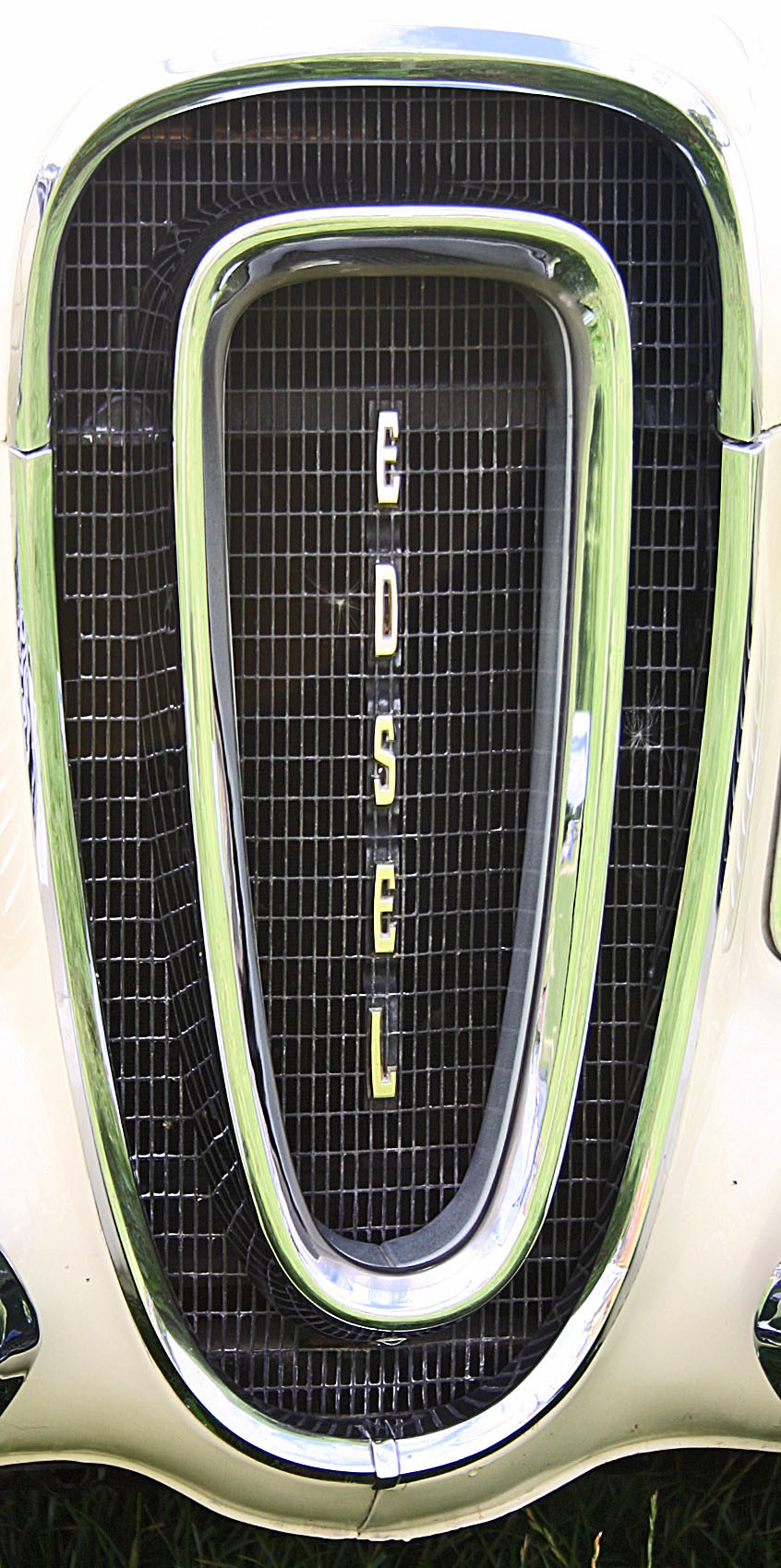
The infamous center grille of 1958 Edsels

Edsel's most memorable design feature was its trademark "horsecollar" grille, which was distinct from that of other cars of the period. According to a popular joke at the time, Edsels "resembled an Oldsmobile sucking a lemon".

According to Thomas E. Bonsall's 2002 book, Disaster in Dearborn, it was assistant stylist Bob "Robin" Jones who suggested a vertical motif for the front end of the "E-car".

Edsel's front end bore little resemblance, if any, to the original concept. Roy Brown, the original chief designer on the Edsel project, had envisioned a slender, almost delicate opening in the center. Engineers, fearing engine cooling problems, vetoed the intended design, so a ring design was suggested. Ernest Breech then demanded that the grille be taller and wider, which led to the "horsecollar". The vertical grille, after being improved for the 1959 models, was discontinued for the 1960 models, which were similar to Ford models of the same year, although coincidentally, the new front end was very similar to that of the 1959 Pontiac.

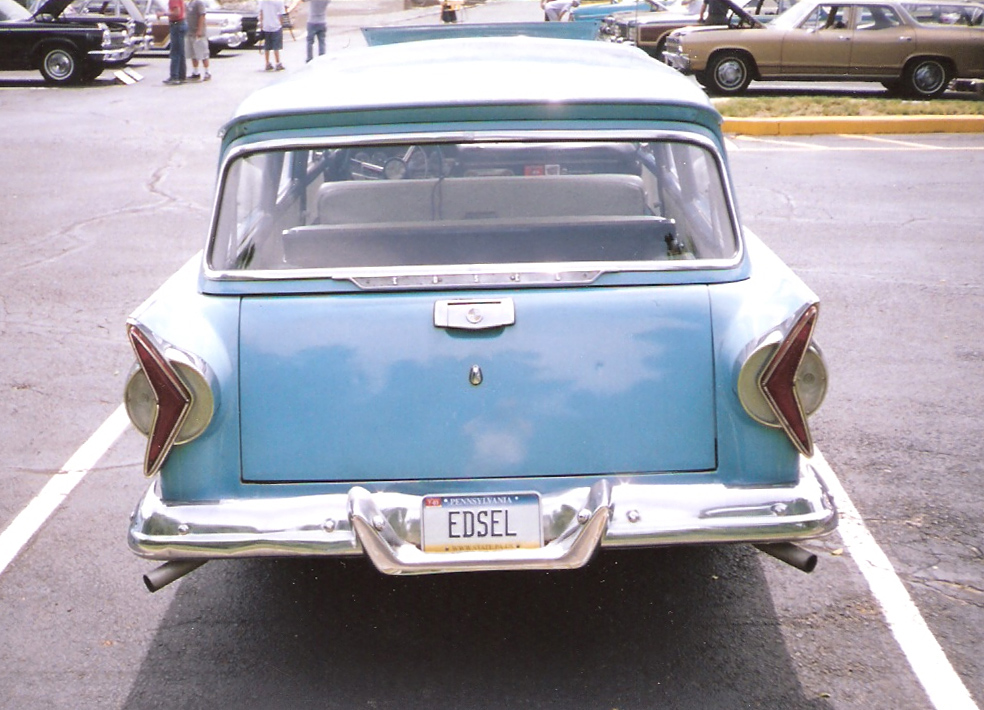
The tail lights on a 1958 Edsel Villager station wagon

Complaints also surfaced about the taillights on 1958 Edsel station wagons. The lenses were boomerang-shaped and placed in a reverse fashion. At a distance, they appeared as arrows pointed in the opposite direction of the turn being made. When the left turn signal flashed, its arrow shape pointed right, and vice versa. However, there was little that could be done to give the Ford-based station wagons a unique appearance from the rear, because corporate management had insisted that no sheetmetal could be changed. Only the taillights and trim could be touched.

==== Powertrain features ====
The Teletouch pushbutton automatic transmission selector was an extremely complex feature. It proved problematic in part because the steering wheel hub, where the pushbuttons were located, was the traditional location of the horn button. Some drivers inadvertently shifted gears when they intended to sound the horn. While Edsels were fast, the location of the transmission pushbuttons was not conducive to street racing. There were also jokes among stoplight drag racers about the buttons: D for Drag, L for Leap, and R for Race, instead of Drive, Low and Reverse.

The control wires for Teletouch were also routed too close to the exhaust manifold, which often caused unpredictable movement of the selector mechanism and, in some cases, complete failure. The electrical design required drivers to shift from Park to Reverse to Neutral to Drive, in that order, to avoid overloading the Teletouch motor. The motor was also not powerful enough to bring the car out of Park while on a hill, so dealerships would instruct drivers to set the parking brake before pushing the Park button.

Mechanics of the time were wary of the 410-cubic-inch Edsel "E-475" engine because its perfectly flat cylinder heads lacked distinct combustion chambers. The heads were set at an angle, with "roof" pistons forming both a squish zone on one side and a combustion chamber on the other. Combustion thus took place entirely within the cylinder bore. This design was similar to Chevrolet's 348-cubic-inch "W" engine, which was also introduced in 1958. While the design reduced the cost of manufacture and may also have helped minimize carbon buildup, it was also unfamiliar to many mechanics.

=== Company politics and the role of Robert McNamara ===
Following World War II, Henry Ford II retained Robert McNamara as one of the 10 Ford "Whiz Kids" to help turn Ford around. McNamara's cost-cutting and cost-containment skills helped Ford emerge from its near-collapse after the war. As a result, McNamara eventually amassed a considerable amount of power at Ford. McNamara's priorities were very much reminiscent of Henry Ford in that, like the elder Ford, McNamara was committed to the Ford marque to the almost total exclusion of the company's other products. Thus, McNamara had little use for the Continental, Lincoln, Mercury and Edsel brand cars made by the company.

McNamara opposed the formation of the separate divisions for Continental, Lincoln, Mercury, and Edsel cars, and moved to consolidate Lincoln, Mercury, and Edsel into the M-E-L division. McNamara saw to it that the Continental program was canceled and that the model was merged into the Lincoln range for 1958. He next set his sights on Edsel by maneuvering for elimination of the dual wheelbases and separate bodies used for 1958. Instead, Edsels would share the Ford platform and use Ford's inner body structure for 1959.

By 1960, Edsels emerged as little more than a Ford with different trim. McNamara moved to reduce Edsel's advertising budget for 1959, and for 1960, he virtually eliminated it. The final blow came in the fall of 1959, when McNamara convinced Henry Ford II and the rest of Ford's management that Edsel was doomed and that it was time to end production before Edsel bled the company dry. McNamara also attempted to discontinue the Lincoln nameplate, but that effort ended with Elwood Engel's now classic redesign of 1961. McNamara left Ford when he was named Secretary of Defense by President John F. Kennedy.

During the 1964 presidential election, Republican nominee Barry Goldwater blamed McNamara, then Secretary of Defense, for Edsel's failure. Eventually, Ford's former executive vice president Ernest R. Breech, who was a financial contributor to Goldwater, wrote to the Senator's campaign, explaining that "Mr. McNamara ... had nothing to do with the plans for the Edsel car or any part of the program." However, the charge continued to be leveled against McNamara for years. During his time as head of the World Bank, McNamara instructed his public affairs officer to distribute copies of Breech's letter to the press whenever the accusation was made.

The Ho Chi Minh Museum in Hanoi features an Edsel crashing through a wall, intended to symbolically represent US military failure in the Vietnam War. McNamara became the US Secretary of Defense after his career at Ford, and oversaw the escalation of the US military presence in Vietnam.

== Epilogue ==
=== Edsels as Mercurys ===
==== Comet ====
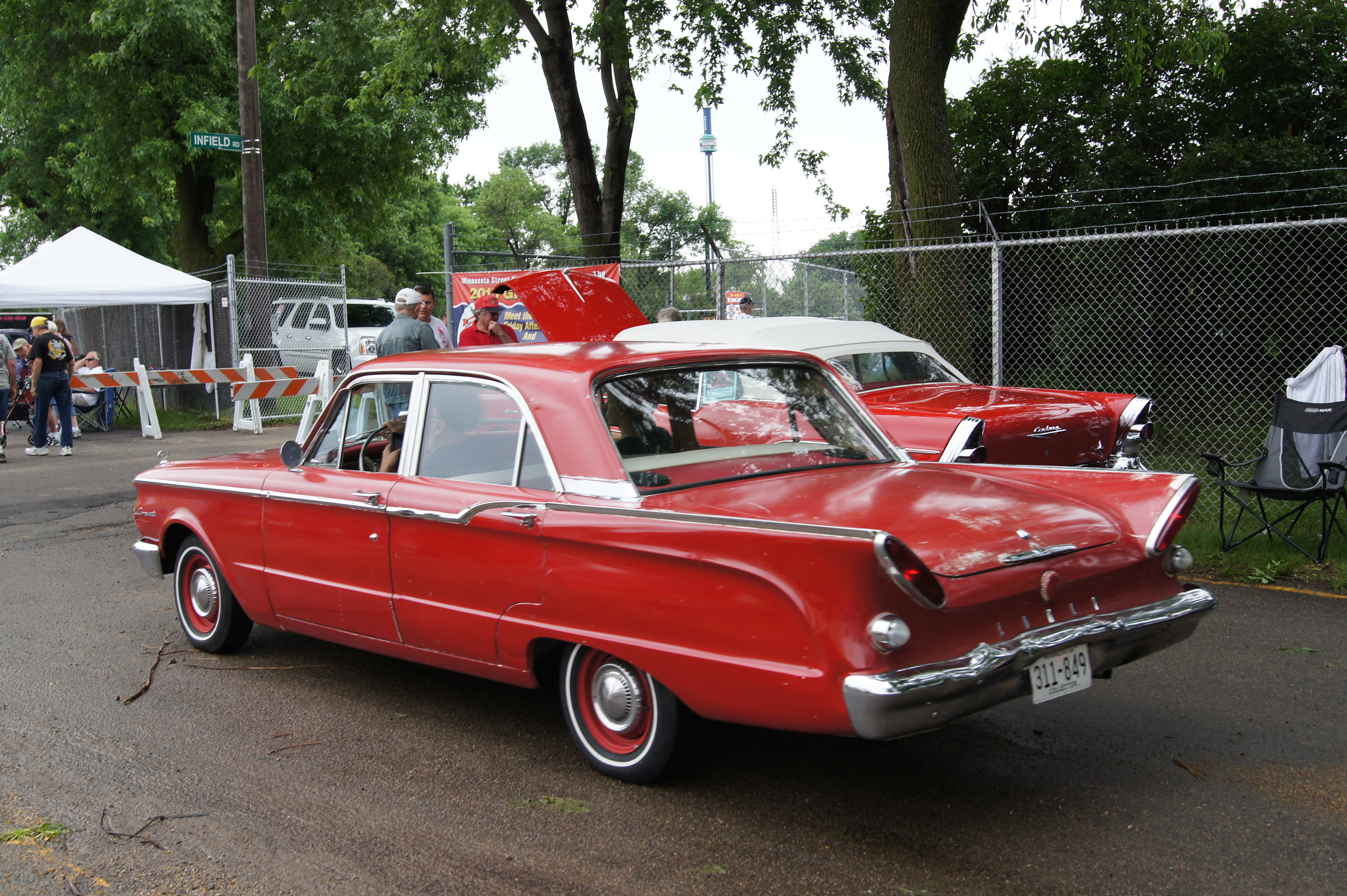
A 1960–1961 Comet, showing similarity to a 1960 Edsel Ranger

While Edsel cost Ford over $250 million in 1958 dollars, the project saw longer-term benefits for the company, as Ford invested over $100 million to build compact cars over the 1960s.

Prior to the closure of the Edsel division, the brand was intending to release the Edsel Comet compact for the 1960 model year, sharing a body with the Ford Falcon. Running prototypes of sedans and station wagons were developed into November 1959, only days before the closure of Edsel. The design was approved for production, with the Comet sold by Lincoln–Mercury under no divisional branding. Though sharing chassis underpinnings and many body stampings with the Falcon, the Comet was stretched to a 114-inch (290 cm) wheelbase, longer than the GM Y-body "senior compacts". The Comet adopted multiple design features from the full-size Edsel line, including its oblong taillamp lenses, though canted diagonally, creating its rear tailfins, along with the instrument cluster. Comet keys were styled like Edsel keys, restyling the "E" emblem as a "C".

While sold without divisional branding, the Comet proved successful; Lincoln–Mercury sold more 1960 Comets than the entire Edsel model line sold through its 1958–1960 existence. For 1962, the Comet was branded as a Mercury; the model line was produced through 1977.

==== Meteor ====
For 1961, Lincoln–Mercury introduced the Mercury Meteor as its entry-level full-size sedan, slotted below the Mercury Monterey. Beginning life as a design for the 1961 Edsel Ranger, the base trim of the Meteor was designed with oblong taillamps, switching to a horizontal layout, derived from the 1960 Ranger and Comet, designed as an Edsel. For 1962, the full-size Meteor was discontinued, with Mercury shifting the nameplate to its newly introduced intermediate car line, becoming a counterpart of the Ford Fairlane to 1963.

=== Design influence ===
While the Edsel trademark vertical grille saw a nearly universal negative response by contemporary buyers and critics, multiple subsequent automobile manufacturers have employed narrow vertically oriented grilles with greater success in the marketplace, including Pontiac, Jaguar, Subaru, Lancia, Alfa Romeo, and Saab. The BMW 4 Series (G22) is a contemporary model line with a vertical grille, generating a negative critical response similar to the Edsel.

Through technological advances, multiple features introduced by Edsel cars, including self-adjusting brakes, automatic climate control, steering wheel-mounted transmission controls, and childproof rear door locks are no longer impractical ideas, but included in many current production features as options or standard equipment.
