= Edsel Citation =

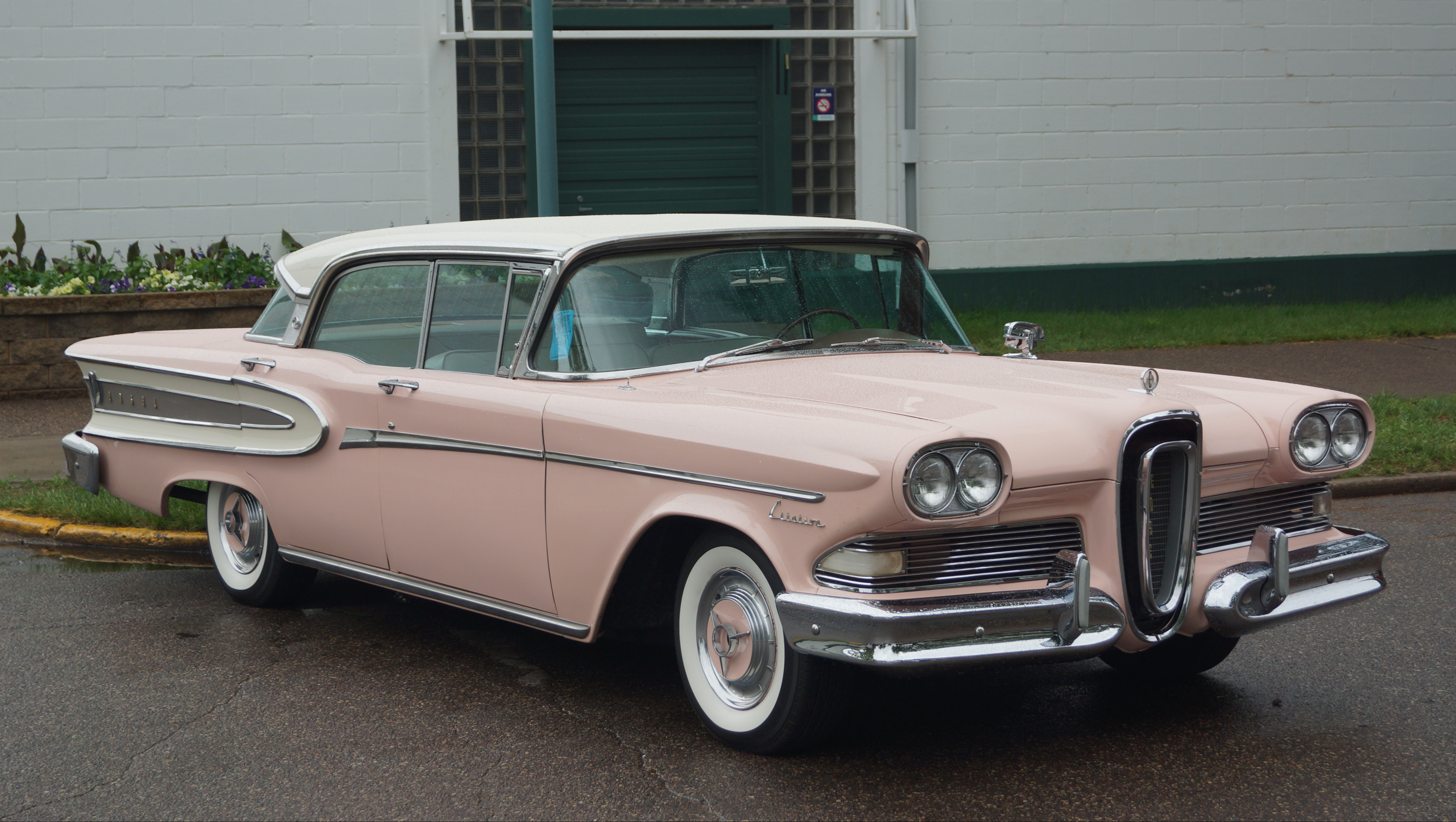

Overview
- Manufacturer: Edsel (Ford)
- Model years: 1958
- Assembly: Wayne Stamping & Assembly, Wayne, Michigan; Somerville Assembly, Somerville, Massachusetts; Los Angeles Assembly, Pico Rivera, California; Oakville Assembly, Oakville, Ontario, Canada
- Designer: Roy Brown Jr.

Body and chassis
- Class: Full-size
- Body style: 2-door convertible 2-door hardtop 4-door hardtop
- Chassis: Body-on-frame
- Related: Edsel Corsair; Mercury Turnpike Cruiser; Mercury Montclair; Mercury Monterey

Powertrain
- Engine: Ford 410 cu in (6.7 L) MEL V8
- Transmission: Ford 3-speed Cruise-O-Matic MX automatic

Dimensions
- Wheelbase: 124 in (3,150 mm)
- Length: 218.9 in (5,560 mm)
- Width: 79.8 in (2,027 mm)
- Curb weight: 4,300–4,500 lb (1,950–2,041 kg)

Chronology
- Successor: Edsel Corsair (1959)

The Edsel Citation is an automobile that was produced by the Edsel division of Ford for the 1958 model year. The flagship Edsel model line, the Citation was offered as two and four-door hardtop sedans as well as a two-door convertible. Slotted above the Corsair, the exterior of the Citation was distinguished by additional stainless steel trim and a gold-anodized aluminum cove panel (emulating the Mercury Turnpike Cruiser).

In total, 8,574 Citations were produced by Edsel, of which 930 were convertibles, making the Citation convertible the second-rarest 1958 Edsel (following the nine-passenger Edsel Bermuda station wagon with 779 produced).

== Model overview ==
When Edsel debuted for the 1958 model year, in place of a brand-specific body and chassis, its lower-cost model lines (the Ranger and Pacer, and all Edsel station wagons) shared their chassis with the Ford Fairlane, while its premium lines (Corsair and Citation) shared their underpinnings with the Mercury Monterey and Montclair.

The Citation was produced solely for 1958. For 1959, Edsel consolidated its model offerings to Ford-based vehicles, including the Ranger, Villager wagon, and Corsair (shifting to a Ford chassis).

=== Chassis ===
Alongside the Edsel Corsair, the Edsel Citation shared its chassis with Mercury, extended to a 124-inch wheelbase. Using a body-on-frame layout, the Citation shared design commonality with Mercury and Ford, using a leaf-sprung rear axle and independent ball-joint front suspension with coil springs.

The Citation was powered by a 410 cu in (6.7 L) MEL V8. Introduced for 1958 for Mercury, Edsel, and Lincoln, the 410 was exclusive to the Corsair and Citation (and no Lincoln-Mercury models), producing 345 hp. A 3-speed automatic was standard, paired with Teletouch steering wheel transmission controls.

1958 Edsel Citation powertrain details
Engine	Configuration	Fuel system	Output		Transmission
Engine	Configuration	Fuel system	Horsepower	Torque	Transmission
E-475 V8 (Ford MEL)	410 cu in (6.7 L) OHV V8	4-bbl carburetor	345 bhp (257 kW)	475 lb⋅ft (644 N⋅m)	Ford 3-speed Cruise-O-Matic MX/FX

=== Body ===
The Citation was offered as a two-door and four-door hardtop and as a two-door convertible. Among 1958 Edsels, the Citation was the sole Mercury-based model line offered as a convertible. In contrast to other Edsels, the Citation was fitted with the most exterior stainless steel trim and a gold-anodized aluminum cove panel. Multiple paint combinations were available, with two-tone paint (roof and cove panel contrast) or three-tone paint (cove panel painted to contrast the body and the roof).

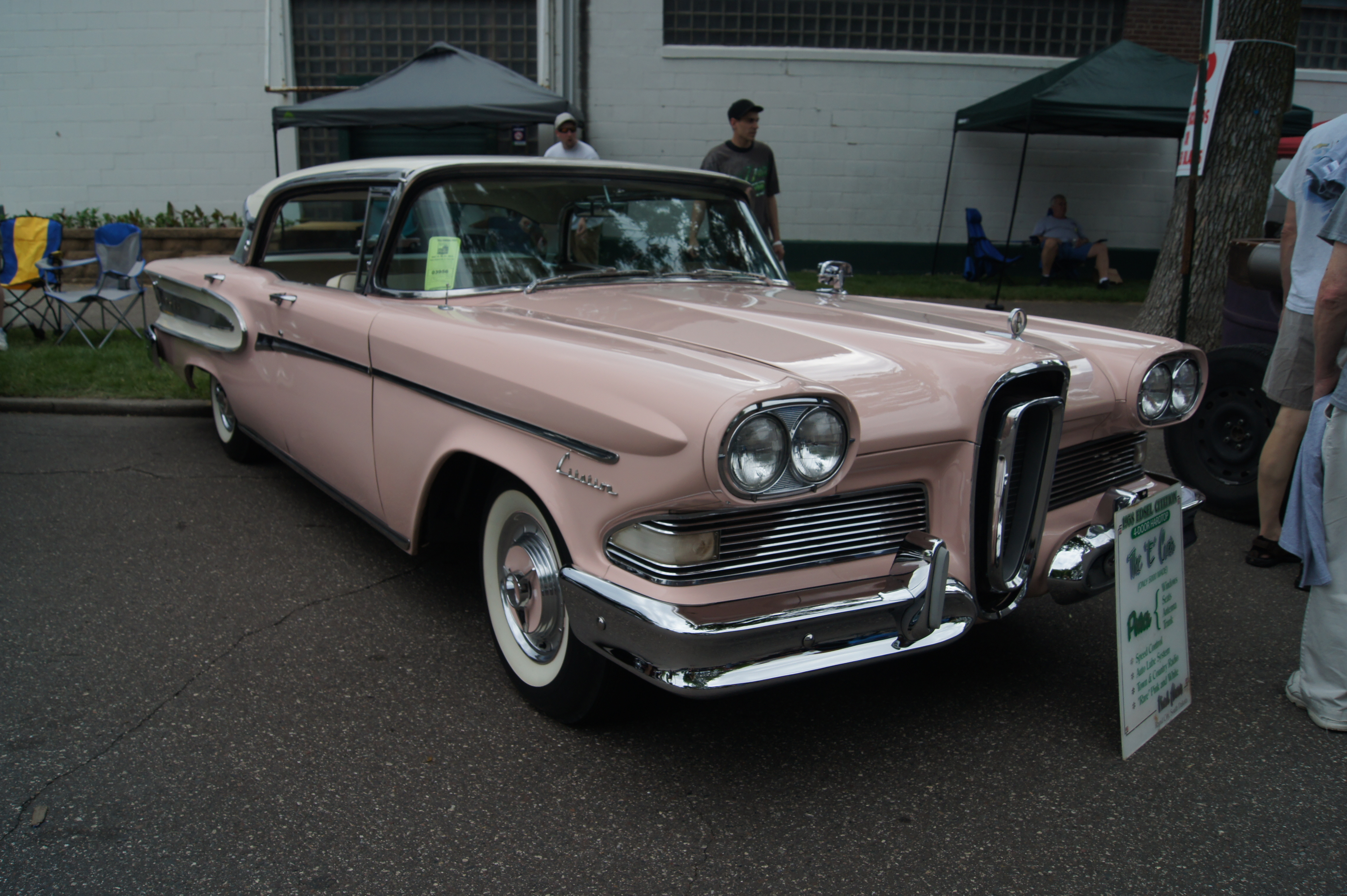
1958 Edsel Citation 4-door hardtop

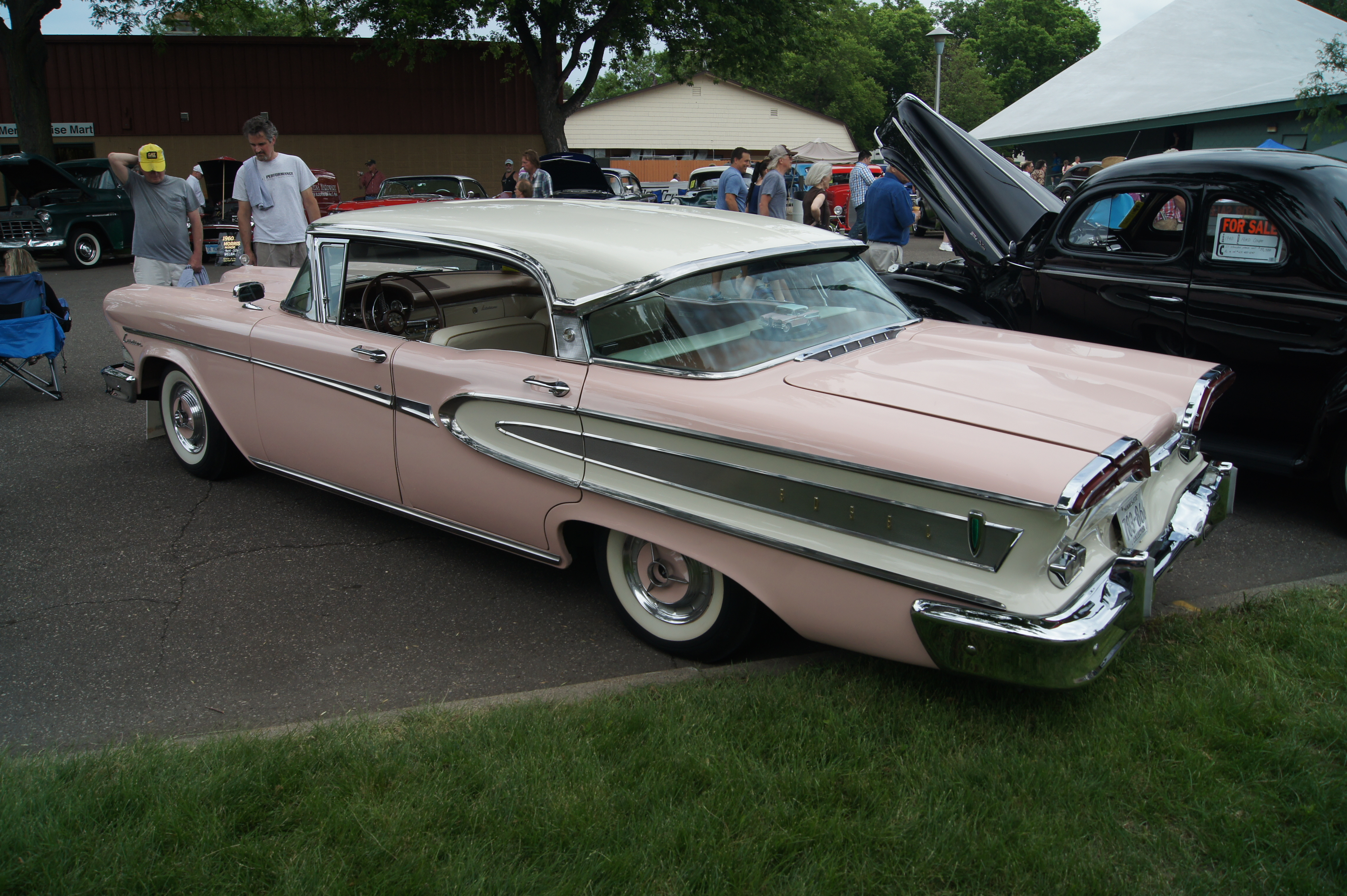
1958 Edsel Citation 4-door hardtop (rear view)

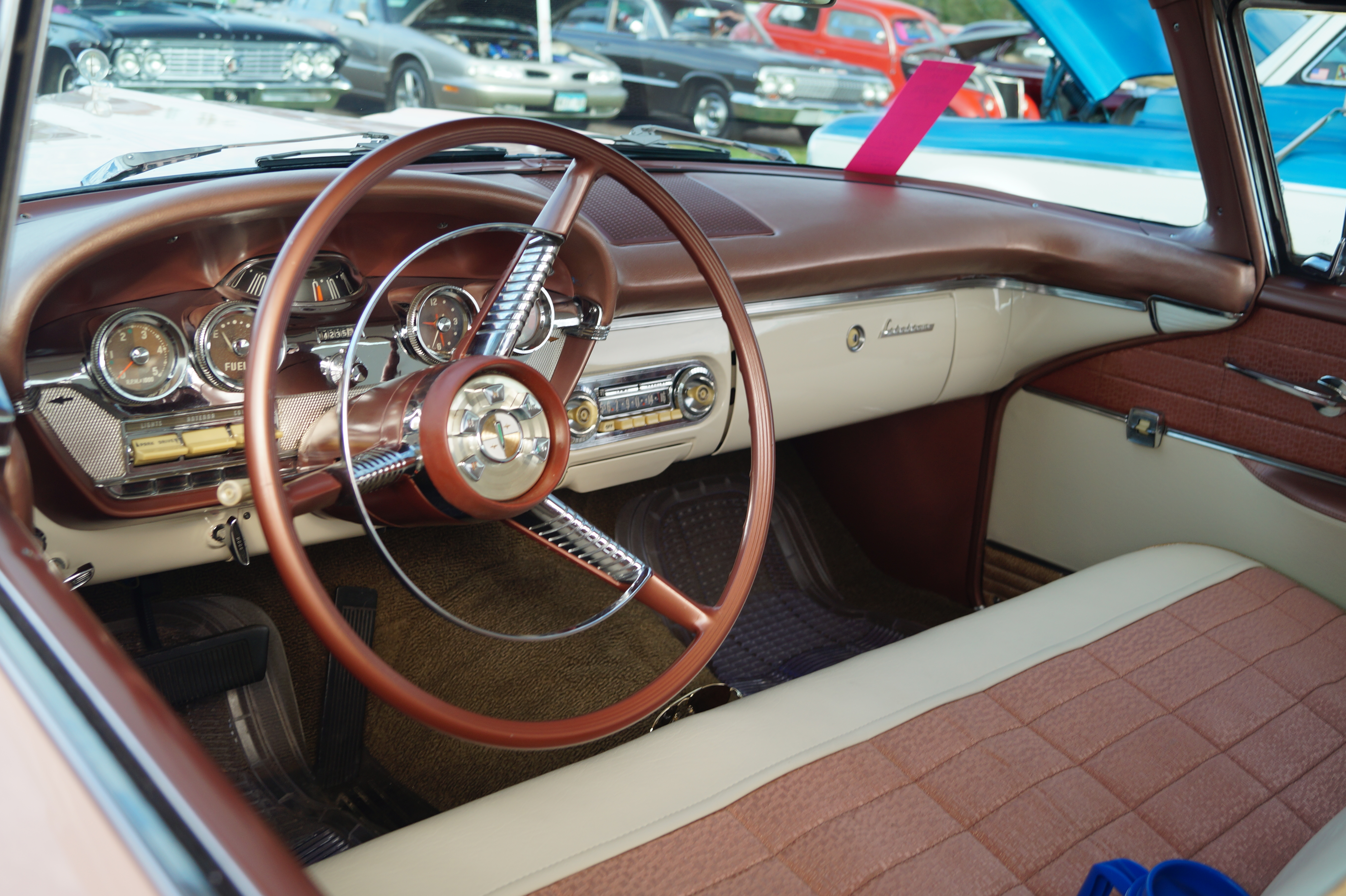
Dashboard image, 1958 Edsel Citation 4-door hardtop

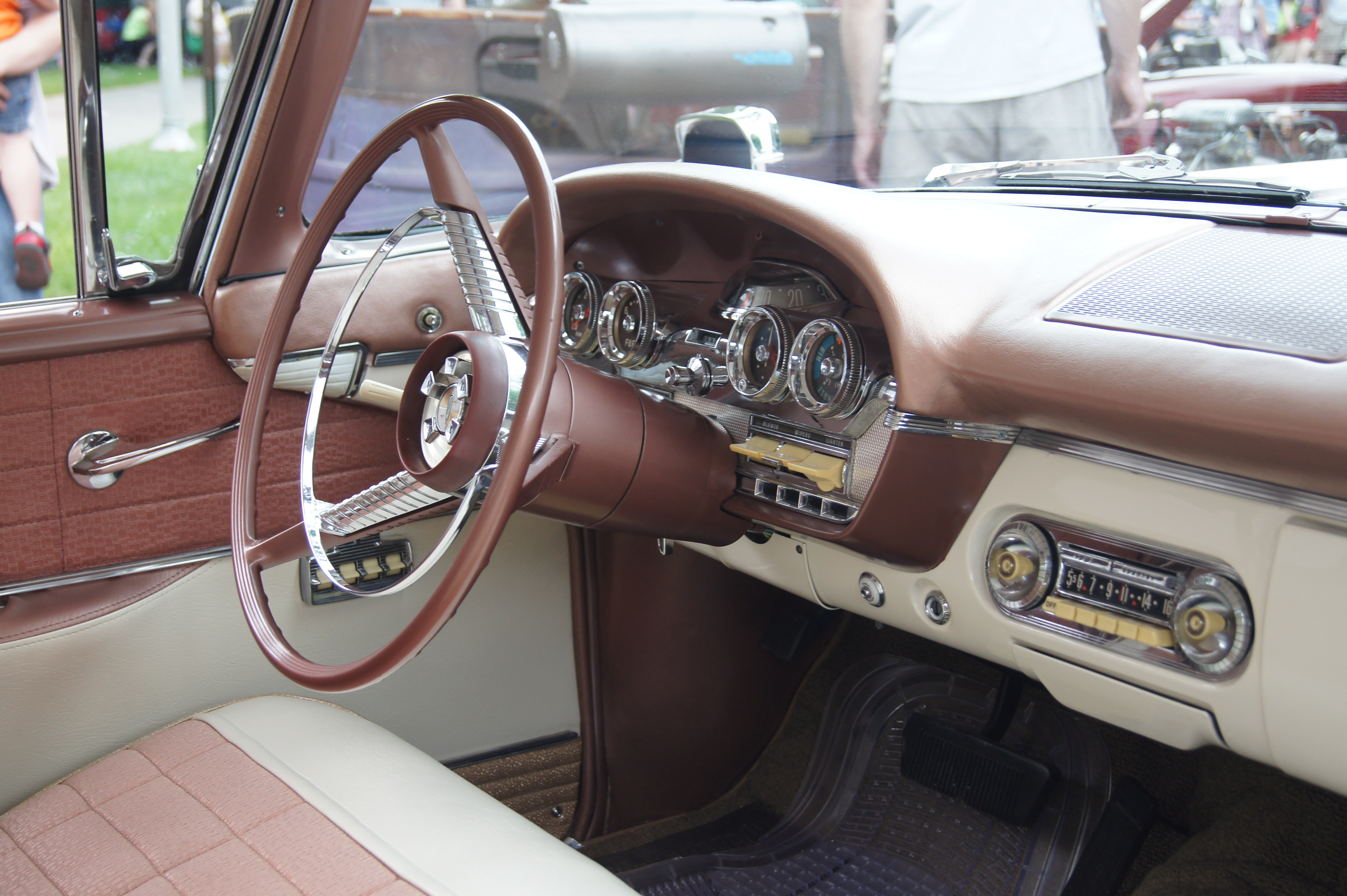
1958 dashboard

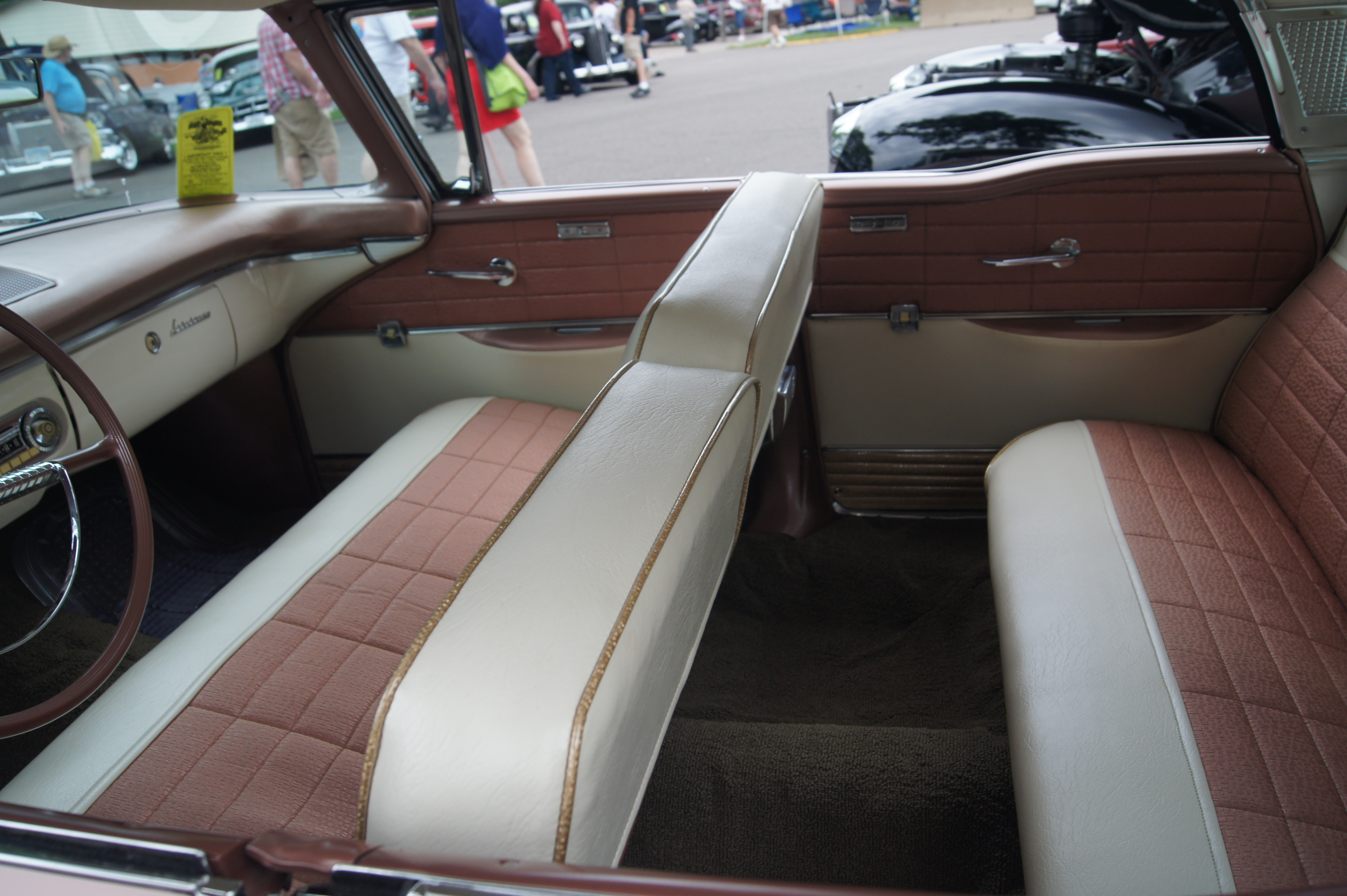
1958 Edsel Citation, front and rear seats

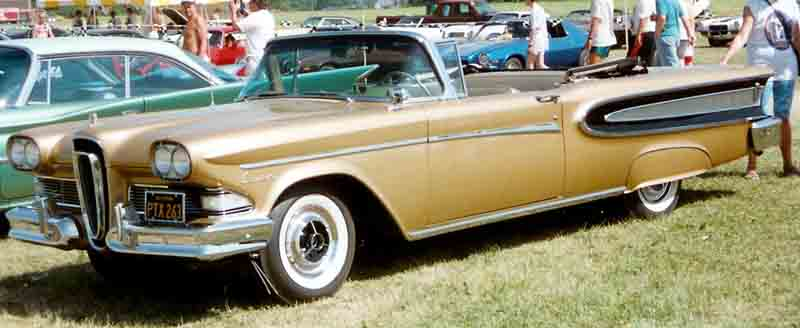
1958 Edsel Citation convertible

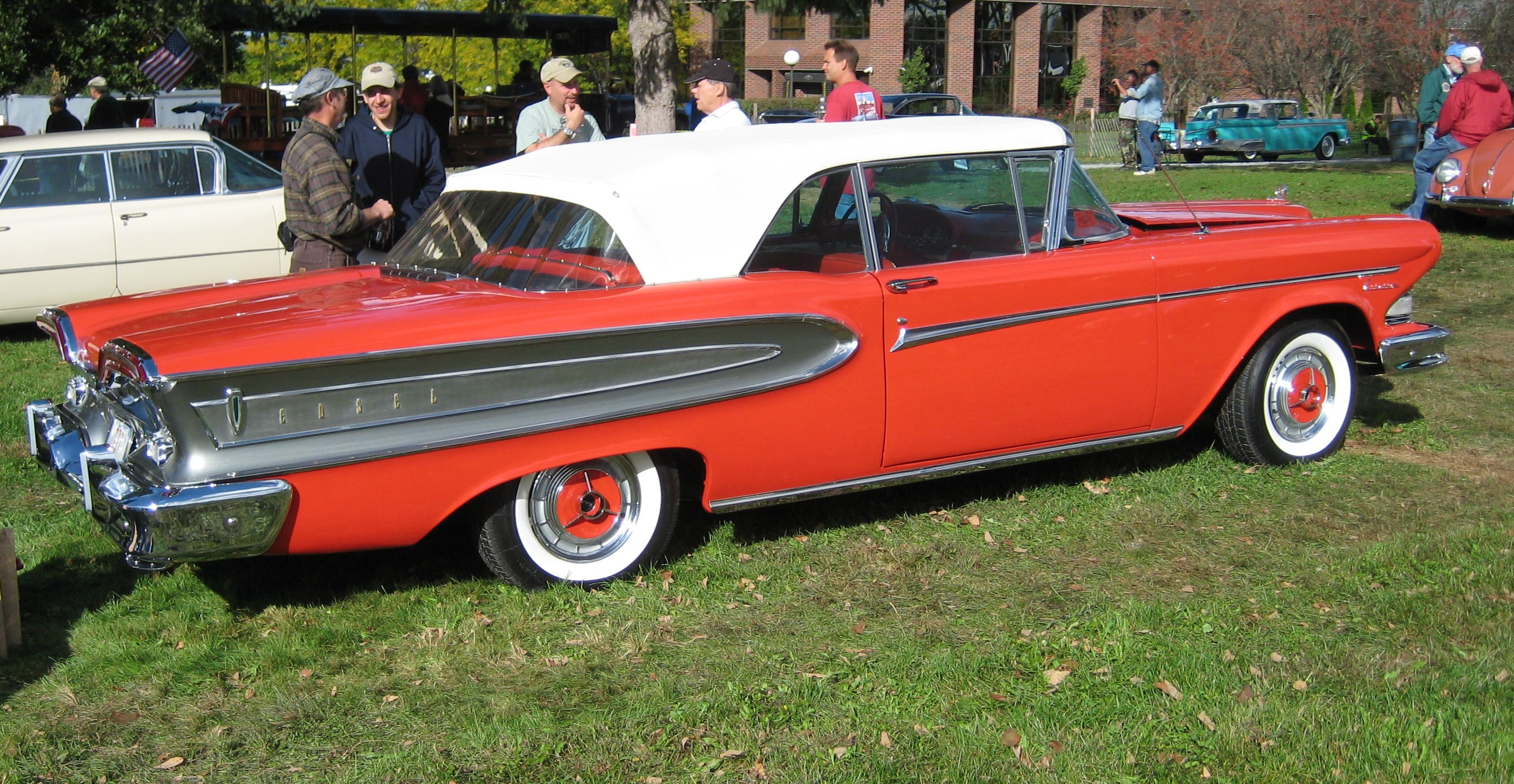
1958 Edsel Citation convertible

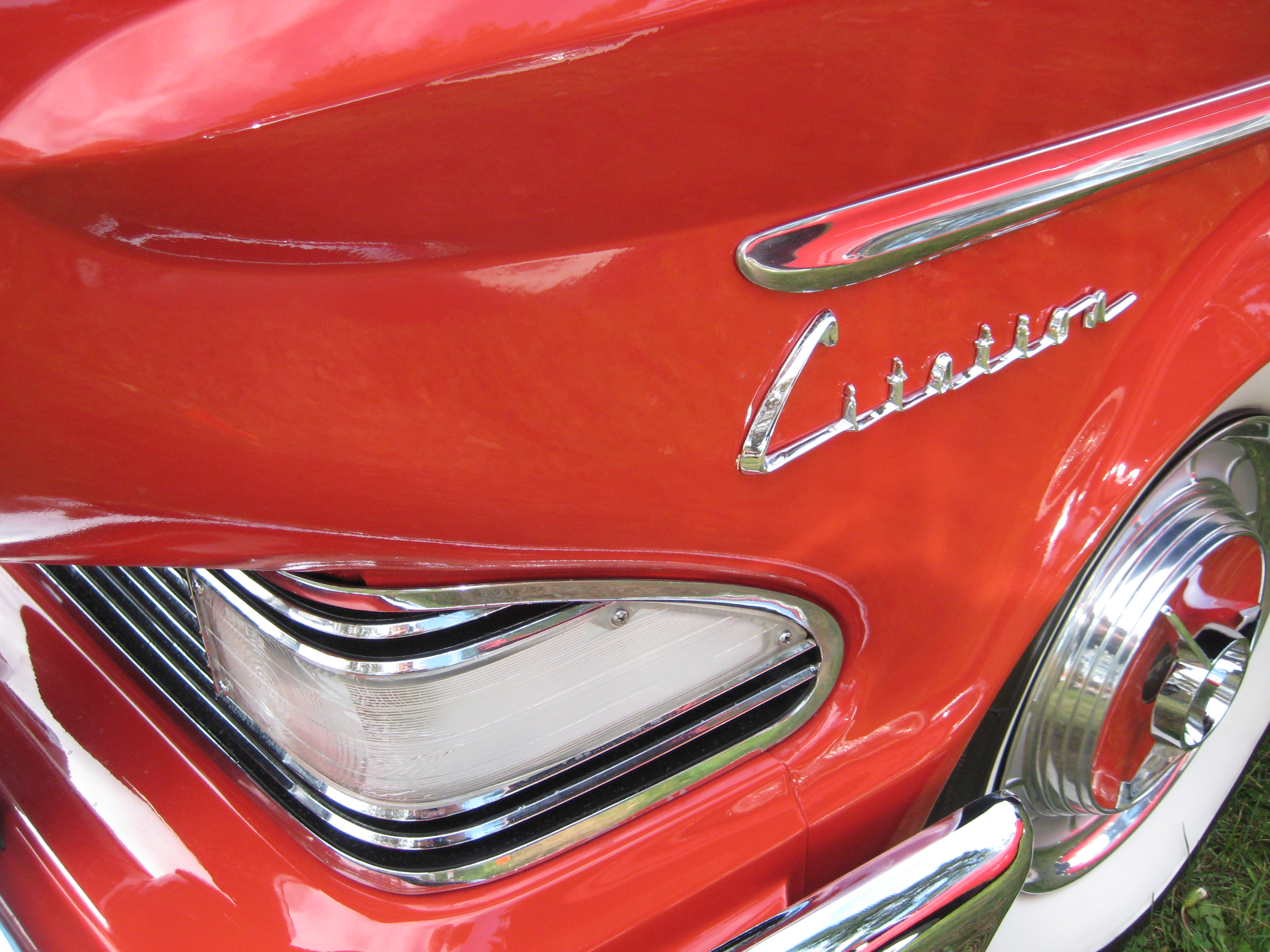
1958 Edsel Citation, close up of fender badging

=== Features ===
For the time of its 1958 launch, the Citation offered a number of innovative safety and design features. Intended to keep driver hands on the steering wheel, the Teletouch system (relocating transmission controls to the steering wheel hub) was standard on the Citation & Corsair (optional on the Ranger and Pacer). The instrument panel centered its gauges in front of the steering wheel, including a thermostat-style control for the heating system (air conditioning was an option) and a compass; a tachometer was an option. Along with being one of the first vehicles to feature warning lights to monitor multiple vehicle functions, the speedometer of the Citation indicated a warning if a preset speed was exceeded. A unique option was "Edsel Lubricator", allowing the car to lubricate itself by the touch of a dashboard button (presuming the owner kept the reservoir filled). Along with power brakes, power steering, and power windows, the Citation offered internal releases for the trunk and hood.

The Citation adopted several elements of the Ford Lifeguard safety system, standardizing a padded dashboard, deep-dish steering wheel and double-latched doors; options included seat belts and an early form of childproof door locks.

== Production ==
Production Figures for 1958 Edsel Citation
Body Style	Units
2-Door Convertible	930
2-Door Hardtop	2,532
4-Door Hardtop	5,112
Total	8,574
