= Doraemon (disambiguation) =

Doraemon is a Japanese manga series written and illustrated by Fujiko F. Fujio.

Doraemon may also refer to:

- Doraemon (character), a robotic cat from the future
- Doraemon (1973 TV series), which ran from April to September 1973
- Doraemon (1979 TV series), which ran from 1979 to 2005
- Doraemon (2005 TV series), which has run since 2005
- Doraemon (2014 TV series), which ran from 2014 to 2015
- Doraemon (1986 video game), by Hudson Soft
- Doraemon: Nobita to Mittsu no Seireiseki, a 1997 Nintendo 64 video game
