= David Wallace =

David or Dave Wallace may refer to:

== Arts and entertainment ==
- David Foster Wallace (1962–2008), American novelist and essayist
- David Rains Wallace (born 1945), author on conservation and natural history
- David Wallace (American actor) (born 1958), American actor
- David Wallace (Scottish actor), Scottish actor and theatre director
- David Wallace (The Office), fictional CEO of Dunder Mifflin on the US TV series The Office

== Politics ==
- David Euan Wallace (1892–1941), British Conservative member of parliament
- David G. Wallace, American businessman and politician, mayor of Sugar Land, Texas
- David J. Wallace (Oklahoma politician), state legislator who was African American
- David Wallace (Arkansas politician), U.S. Army officer and member of the Arkansas Senate
- David Wallace (Indiana politician) (1799–1859), American politician, governor of the state of Indiana
- David Wardrope Wallace (1850–1924), Canadian MP for Russell, 1903–1904

== Sports ==
- Dave Wallace (baseball) (born 1947), coach and player
- Dave Wallace (cricketer), American cricketer
- David Wallace (catcher) (born 1979), American professional baseball player
- David Wallace (footballer) (died 2023), New Zealand international football (soccer) player
- David Wallace (rugby union) (born 1976), Irish rugby union player

== Other ==
- David Frederick Wallace (1900–1957), architect and brother of First Lady of the United States Bess Truman
- David A. Wallace (1917–2004), urban planner and architect
- David R. Wallace (1942–2012), American software engineer and inventor
- David Wallace (executive) (1908–1974), Ford executive
- Sir David Wallace (physicist) (born 1945), British physicist and Master of Churchill College, Cambridge
- Sir David Wallace (surgeon) (1862–1952), Scottish surgeon
- David Wallace (medievalist), British scholar of medieval literature

== See also ==
- David Wallis Reeves (1838–1900), composer
- David Wallace-Wells, American journalist
