= Doraemon (2014 TV series) =

Japanese anime series or program

- Also known as: Doraemon: Gadget Cat From the Future
- Genre: Science fiction
- Created by: Fujiko F. Fujio
- Based on: Doraemon by Fujiko F. Fujio
- Written by: Manami Sakurai; Higashi Shimizu; Kimihito Ito; Yosuke Suzuki; Isao Murayama; Teruko Uchiumi
- Directed by: Kristi Reed; Wendee Lee
- Voices of: Mona Marshall; Johnny Yong Bosch; Cassandra Lee Morris; Kaiji Tang; Brian Beacock; Wendee Lee
- Music by: Joseph Bauer
- Country of origin: United States
- Original language: English
- No. of seasons: 2
- No. of episodes: 52 (104 segments)

Production
- Editor: Victor Sgroi
- Running time: 22 minutes
- Production companies: TV Asahi; Shin-Ei Animation; Bang Zoom! Entertainment

Original release
- Network: Disney XD
- Release: July 7, 2014 – September 1, 2015

Related
- 2005 anime; 1979 anime; 1973 anime

Doraemon is the most recent anime series based on Fujiko F. Fujio's manga of the same name. Produced by Shin-Ei Animation, it began airing on TV Asahi on April 15, 2005. The series' edited American dub is produced by Bang Zoom! Entertainment and premiered July 7, 2014, on Disney XD at 12:30 PM EST during the Animication block.

== Synopsis ==
Noby's life is changed forever the day Doraemon—a "cat-type robot" from the 22nd century—pops out of a time portal in Noby's top desk drawer. Doraemon has been sent back in time by Noby's great-great grandson Soby to change Noby's life for the better, and thus improve the life of all his descendants. Unfortunately, Noby seems to cause a great deal of his own misfortune, and the addition of an endless supply of futuristic gadgets from Doraemon's "4th-Dimensional Secret Gadget Pocket" tends to create even more trouble.

== Characters ==
- Doraemon is a "cat-type" robot, "born" on September 3, 2112, and sent back in time to protect and assist Noby, and generally make sure his legendarily tragic life turns out for the better. To help him in this effort, Doraemon can produce an infinite array of futuristic secret gadgets from the 4th-Dimensional Secret Gadget Pocket on his tummy. Unfortunately, Noby's propensity for misusing these gadgets—combined with Doraemon's occasional lapses in judgment—usually causes even more trouble.
- Noby is a 10-year-old, lazy, uncoordinated, and a terrible student... but at least his heart is in the right place. When his great-great grandson Soby arrives from the future and tells him about the misfortunes awaiting him later in life, Noby resolves to change his ways in hopes of making things turn out better for him and his descendants. With Doraemon's help, Noby tries his best... but it's an uphill struggle, and life with a gadget-carrying robot cat from the future is fraught with temptation! Noby himself often comically laments, "Why do I make such poor choices?"
- Sue is a popular girl in Noby's school. One of Noby's best friends, she sees beyond his shortcomings and is quick to come to his defense. When she's not studying or playing sports, she can usually be found practicing violin... and boy, does she need practice!
- Big G plays a little rough, and some might even call him a bully, but deep down, Big G is a simple guy with a big heart. He harbors a not-so-secret passion to be a great singer, and doesn't let his complete lack of talent stop him... much to the dismay of his friends and neighbors! He is intensely protective of his sister, Little G, but terrified of his strong-willed mother.
- Sneech is well-spoken, artistic, and above all, extremely proud of his family's wealth. He's constantly showing off the very latest toy or video game that he's acquired, usually before it's even available in stores. Secretly a bit insecure about his height, Sneech dreams of being a singing idol and a movie star. Not that he has any interest in singing or acting, mind you. He just wants public adoration and fame to match his fortune.
- Tammy is Noby's bespectacled, stay-at-home mother, and the one Noby inherits his appearance from. She can be extremely strict and she is often seen scolding Noby for his actions, such as failing the exam, playing all day instead of studying, being lazy all day, or doing something stupid. Sometimes she goes too far leading Noby in several episodes trying to avoid his mother's scolding by using Doraemon's gadgets.
- Toby is Noby's father and laid-back salaryman. He appears to be an easy-going father, often seen arriving home from work to soothe Tammy's anger towards Noby. He has trouble quitting smoking and is self-conscious about his inability to pass the driving test. He also has a poor memory. He likes to drink, and sometimes arrives home drunk from nightly business meetings. Toby often goes to golf which most Japanese businessmen and employees play.
- Dorami is Doraemon's younger sister, and thus also a robot cat like him. She only appears in "Doraemon Squared"
- Soby is the great-great-grandson of Noby. He came to the present world to help Doraemon to help Noby with his future problems.
- Ace Goody is Noby's classmate and friendly rival as he is a good friend of Sue's. He is very intelligent and has a photographic memory. Ace is the perfect all-round student, consistently getting A+'s in class and also being highly capable in sports.
- Little G is Big G's younger sister, and also the only child Big G treats well in the whole story, and Little G too loves her elder brother. In earlier stories, she had bad tempers when something did not go as she pleases, though she mellows down in later stories.
- Mr. S is a strict unnamed teacher at Noby's school who often scolds Noby for not completing his homework, arriving late at school, forgetting his homework, falling asleep during class, and getting worse marks on his tests.
- Sneech's Mom is a fox-faced woman from whom Sneech himself has inherited his physical traits. She can often be seen with expensive jewelry, and she likes to spoil Sneech and give him things without thinking whether it is good for him or bad for him.
- Big G's Mom is the owner of a small but successful store, "Goda's Goods"
- Big G's Dad is a large-sized man with a crew cut.
- Mr. Rumbleton is an old man living next to the Empty Lot where Noby and his friends play. Often the glass of Mr. Rumbleton's windows are broken by their baseballs and footballs.

== Voice cast ==
- Mona Marshall as Doraemon
- Johnny Yong Bosch as Noby
- Cassandra Lee Morris as Sue
- Kaiji Tang as Big G
- Brian Beacock as Sneech
- Mari Devon as Tammy
- Tony Oliver as Toby
- Wendee Lee as Dorami, Guiding Angel, Sue's Mom
- Max Mittelman as Soby
- Spike Spencer as Ace Goody
- Minae Noji as Little G
- Keith Silverstein as Mr. S, Chester Nobi
- Dorothy Elias-Fahn as Sneech's Mom
- Jessica Gee-George as Big G's Mom
- Kirk Thornton as Big G's Dad
- Cristina Valenzuela as Mini-Doraemon
- Todd Haberkorn as Mr. Rumbleton
- Stephanie Sheh as Mimi
- Derek Stephen Prince as Stan
- Mela Lee as Sera Ivy
- Joe J. Thomas as Mr. Saucer
- John DeMita as Mr. Simmons
- Kari Wahlgren as Cosmo
- Anthony Hansen as Pork Chop
- Dave Wallace as George
- Crispin Freeman as Devlin
- Lex Lang as Bengal
- Doug Stone as Gaozook
- Patrick Seitz as Dice

The following is a list of English-dubbed episodes of the anime television series Doraemon (2005 anime), specifically the US version. which was recorded at Bang Zoom! Entertainment and licensed by Viz Media and aired from 2014–2017 on Disney XD.

== Series overview ==
Season	Episodes	Originally aired (US dates)	
Season	Episodes	First aired	Last aired
1	26	July 7, 2014	August 29, 2014
2	26	June 15, 2015	September 1, 2015

== Episodes ==
=== Season 1 (2014) ===
No.	Title	Original release date
1	"All the Way From the Future World / The Mecha-Maker"	July 7, 2014
2	"Transformade / Battle of the Dueling Nobys!"	July 8, 2014
3	"Memory Bread / Lost-and-Found Fishing Pond"	July 9, 2014
4	"Noby, the Great Illusionist / My Best Friend Doraemon"	July 10, 2014
5	"The Not So Lucky, Lucky Cards! / Big G: Master Chef"	July 11, 2014
6	"The Woodcutter's Pond / My Pet Rock"	July 14, 2014
7	"Doraemon's Time Capsule"	July 15, 2014
8	"Machine Copy Machine! / My Own Golden Cloud"	July 16, 2014
9	"Vacuum Cleaner Super Car / Dad's Day Off"	July 17, 2014
10	"Invasion of the Body Swappers! / Livin' the Dream"	July 18, 2014
11	"Escape From Score Zero / Go to the Doctor, Doraemon!"	July 21, 2014
12	"The Skyhorse! / Action Quiz!"	July 22, 2014
13	"A-maze-ing House / Worst Birthday Ever"	July 22, 2014
14	"Sequence Spray / The Connection Cap"	July 24, 2014
15	"Black Hole, White Hole / Surfin' the Dream Channels"	July 28, 2014
16	"Doraemon, Squared / Dinosaur Alert!"	July 29, 2014
17	"Instant Delivery Magic! / The Genie-less Magic Lamp"	July 30, 2014
18	"The Evo-Devo Beam / The Action Planner"	August 18, 2014
19	"Experimental Dream Schemes"	August 19, 2014
20	"Noby's Turn at Bat / The House of Forced Fitness"	August 20, 2014
21	"Werewolf Cream / Monsters in the House"	August 21, 2014
22	"King of the Cavemen / The Moodmaker Orchestra"	August 25, 2014
23	"Time Kerchief / A Good Deed in a Weary World"	August 26, 2014
24	"Makin' Tracks / Noby the Robot"	August 27, 2014
25	"U.F.Yo! / What Day is Today?"	August 28, 2014
26	"A Visitor From the Future"	August 29, 2014

=== Season 2 (2015) ===
No. overall	No. in season	Title	Original release date
27	1	"Calm Down, Big G! / Hello Martians"	June 15, 2015
28	2	"Attaboy, Noby! / Treasure Huntin' Pork Chop"	June 16, 2015
29	3	"Erase Your Face / Doraemon, Doraemon, Everywhere"	June 17, 2015
30	4	"Doraemon and the Space Shooters"	June 18, 2015
31	5	"Guiding Angel / Big G's Pizza of Terror"	June 18, 2015
32	6	"Invasion of the Goat Aliens"	June 22, 2015
33	7	"Animal Transformation Crackers / Deluxified"	June 23, 2015
34	8	"Feeling Crabby / Rock Your World Record"	June 24, 2015
35	9	"Noby Goes Off the Rails / The UnNoby"	June 29, 2015
36	10	"Elementary, My Dear Doraemon / Kernels of Wrath"	June 30, 2015
37	11	"Attack of the Clones / Hole Away From Home"	July 1, 2015
38	12	"Bug Hero Fix / Snowkid on the Block"	July 6, 2015
39	13	"Blowback Bobby / When the Last Leaf Falls"	July 7, 2015
40	14	"Gorgon's Spell / Snow Melt"	July 8, 2015
41	15	"It's the End of the World As We Know It / The Horizon Tape"	July 14, 2015
42	16	"The Galaxy Grand-Prix"	July 15, 2015
43	17	"See You Go Round / The Puppet Master's Camera!"	July 20, 2015
44	18	"SuperBaby Panic / A Hurricane is a Boy's Best Friend"	August 13, 2015
45	19	"I Saw a Ghost!"	August 14, 2015
46	20	"G-Tastic G to the Rescue! / Noby's Tough to Stomach"	August 18, 2015
47	21	"Rub-a-Dub-Dub, See the World from a Tub! / Big Boys Do Cry"	August 19, 2015
48	22	"What's on the Robo-Catwalk? / The Greatest Little Town in the World"	August 20, 2015
49	23	"Noby's Home is His Castle"	August 25, 2015
50	24	"A Little Adventure"	August 27, 2015
51	25	"Noby! Noby! He's Our Man! / Gone with the Sneeze"	August 28, 2015
52	26	"Let Cat's Cradle Rule the World / Big G's Big Show"	September 1, 2015
