= Edsel Corsair =

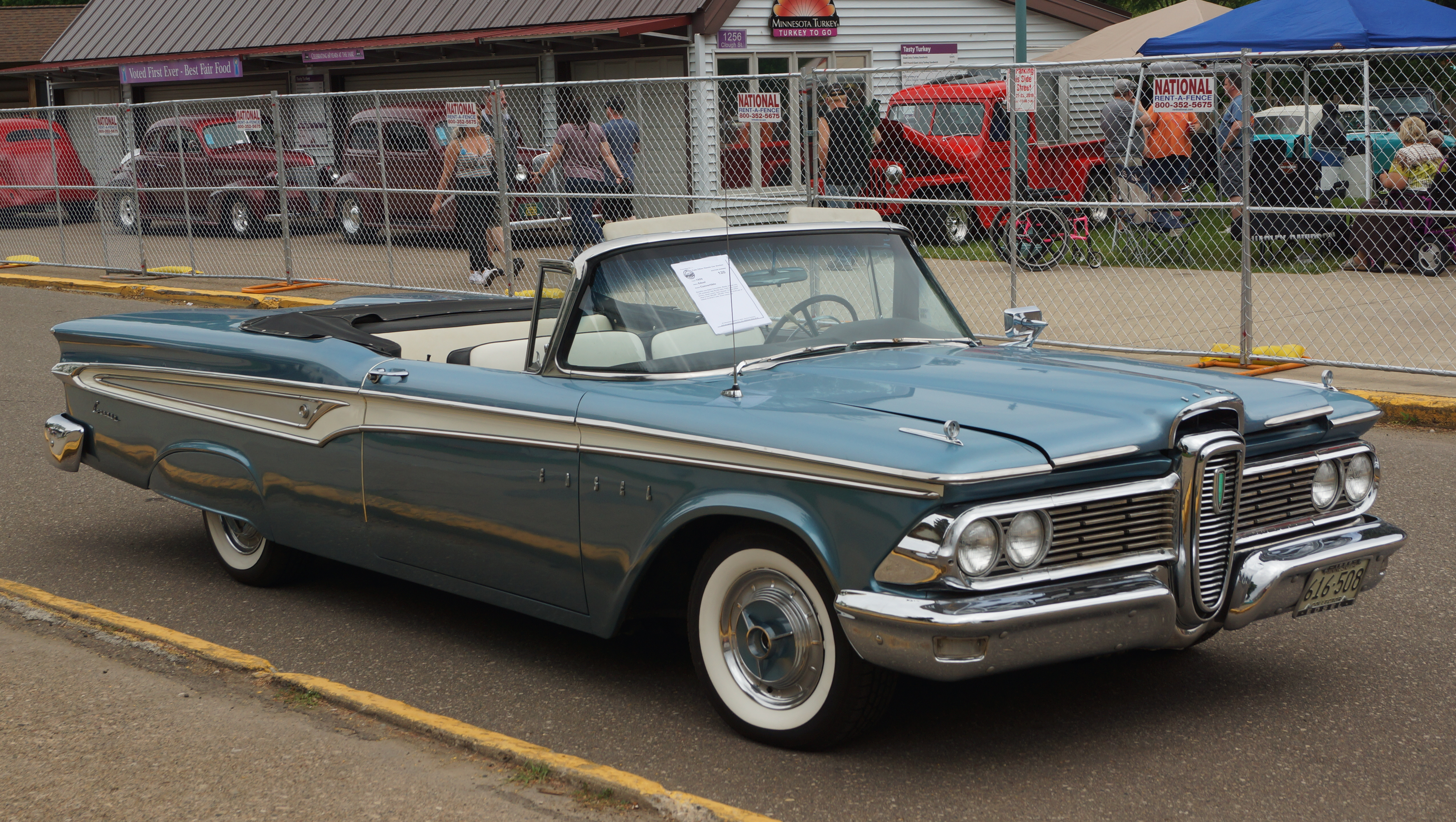
- 1959 Edsel Corsair convertible

Overview
- Manufacturer: Edsel (Ford Motor Company)
- Production: 1958–1959
- Designer: Roy Brown Jr.

Body and chassis
- Class: Full-size
- Layout: FR layout

Chronology
- Predecessor: Mercury Monterey
- Successor: Mercury Meteor

The Edsel Corsair is an automobile that was produced and sold by Edsel in 1958 and 1959. For 1958, the Corsair was built on the longer, wider Edsel platform shared with Mercury. For 1959, the Corsair shared the shorter, narrower Ranger platform with Ford.

== 1958 ==
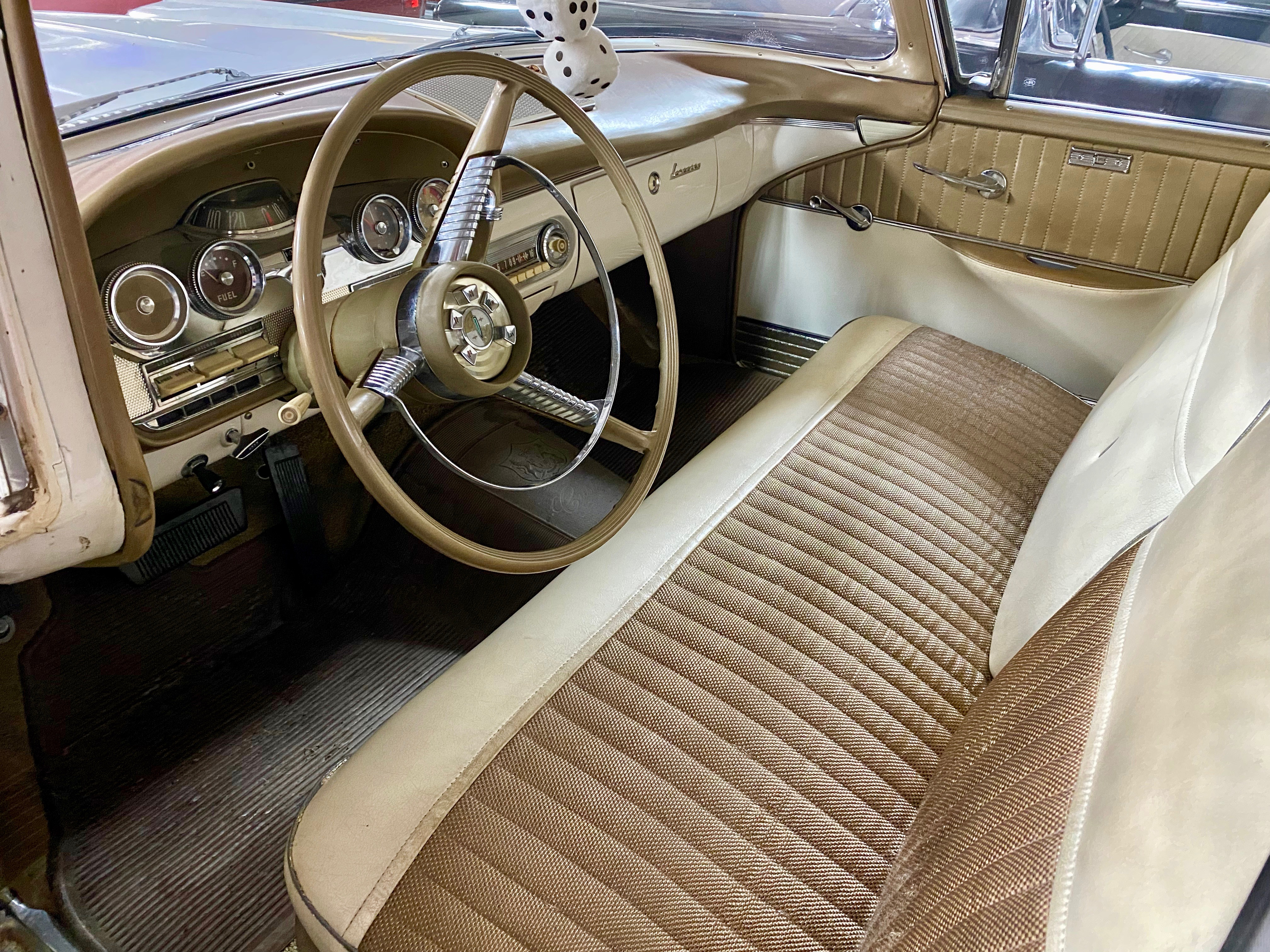
1958 Edsel Corsair interior

First generation
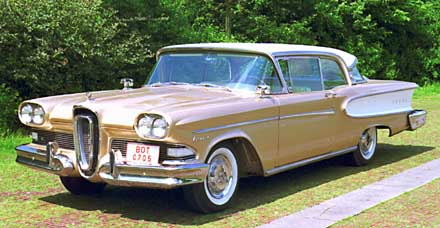
- 1958 Edsel Corsair 2-door hardtop

Overview
- Model years: 1958
- Assembly: Wayne Stamping & Assembly, Wayne, Michigan; Somerville Assembly, Somerville, Massachusetts; Los Angeles Assembly, Pico Rivera, California; Oakville Assembly, Oakville, Ontario, Canada

Body and chassis
- Body style: 2-door hardtop 4-door hardtop
- Related: Mercury Turnpike Cruiser; Mercury Park Lane; Mercury Montclair; Mercury Monterey; Mercury Colony Park; Mercury Voyager; Mercury Commuter; Edsel Citation

Powertrain
- Engine: 410 cu in (6.7 L) MEL V8
- Transmission: 3-speed automatic

Dimensions
- Wheelbase: 124.0 in (3,150 mm)
- Length: 218.9 in (5,560 mm)
- Width: 79.8 in (2,027 mm)
- Height: 56.8 in (1,443 mm)
- Curb weight: 4,300–4,400 lb (2,000–2,000 kg)

The Corsair represented the next-to-highest trim level available within the Edsel brand. It rode on Edsel's 124 in (3150 mm) wheelbase. In addition to higher-grade interior appointments, the Corsair also received additional stainless steel trim and deluxe wheel covers. Available either as a two-door or four-door hardtop, the Corsair, like the premium Citation, shared its roof lines with Mercury models, as well as internal body components. Body parts between the Corsair and Citation models could not be shared with either the Ranger or Pacer, which were built on the shorter, narrower Ford frames. A deep-dished safety steering wheel was standard.

Like the Citation, the Corsair was powered by the 345 bhp (257 kW) 410 cu in (6.7 L) MEL V8 (with four-barrel {four choke} carburetor), and came equipped with Edsel’s Teletouch automatic as standard. (This was a US$231 option on Ranger and Pacer models.) Unlike other Ford models that used a column-mounted gear selector, Teletouch placed its drive-selection buttons in the steering wheel hub where drivers were accustomed to finding the horn button. In emergency situations, damage to the transmission that might occur if the driver hit the Teletouch unit instead of the steering wheel's horn ring was prevented by an electro-hydraulic switch activated by internal transmission fluid pressure. A basic heater (as a US$92 option) and radio (at US$95) were available, and air conditioning was optional as well (at US$460). Also optional were an automatic trunk release, a tachometer, an automatic lube system, seat belts, a padded dash board, warning lights for low oil level and parking brake on, plus rear door safety locks to prevent young kids from opening them while the car is moving.

While their rollout was highly publicized in the fall of 1957, Edsels were a marketing disaster for Ford and Ford's corporate strategy for meeting General Motors' product line for product line. Total Corsair output for the model stood at 9,987 units, only slightly better than the Citation. Of these units, 3,632 were hardtop coupes (3,312 U.S. and 320 Canadian-built) and 6,355 were four-door hardtops (5,880 U.S. and 475 Canadian-built). Prices for the Corsair in 1958 ranged from US$3,311 ($36,948 in 2025 dollars) to $3,390 ($37,830 in 2025 dollars).

Production Figures for 1958 Edsel Corsair
| Body Style | Units |
|---|---|
| 2-Door Hardtop | 3,632 |
| 4-Door Hardtop | 6,355 |
| Total | 9,987 |

== Different platforms ==
The model year of Edsel's introduction was a post-WW II high point of sorts for the Ford Motor Company. Three full-sized platforms of distinctly different interior widths were in use each by Lincoln, Mercury, and Ford, a situation that lasted until Ford received a much wider platform in 1960. Edsel shared both Mercury's and Ford's platforms in 1958, so offers an insight into their differing interior dimensions.

| 1958 comparison | Edsel Citation/Corsair | Edsel Pacer/Ranger |
|---|---|---|
| Wheelbase | 124.0 in (3,150 mm) | 118.0 in (2,997 mm) |
| Overall length | 218.9 in (5,560 mm) | 213.2 in (5,415 mm) |
| Width | 79.8 in (2,027 mm) | 78.8 in (2,002 mm) |
| Height | 56.8 in (1,443 mm) | 56.2 in (1,427 mm) |
| Front headroom | 33.9 in (861 mm) | 33.2 in (843 mm) |
| Front legroom | 44.2 in (1,123 mm) | 43.1 in (1,095 mm) |
| Front hip room | 63.5 in (1,613 mm) | 60.0 in (1,524 mm) |
| Front shoulder room | 59.7 in (1,516 mm) | 57.3 in (1,455 mm) |
| Rear headroom | 32.8 in (833 mm) | 33.6 in (853 mm) |
| Rear legroom | 43.4 in (1,102 mm) | 40.7 in (1,034 mm) |
| Rear hip room | 63.5 in (1,613 mm) | 60.1 in (1,527 mm) |
| Rear shoulder room | 59.7 in (1,516 mm) | 57.0 in (1,448 mm) |

== 1959 ==
Second generation
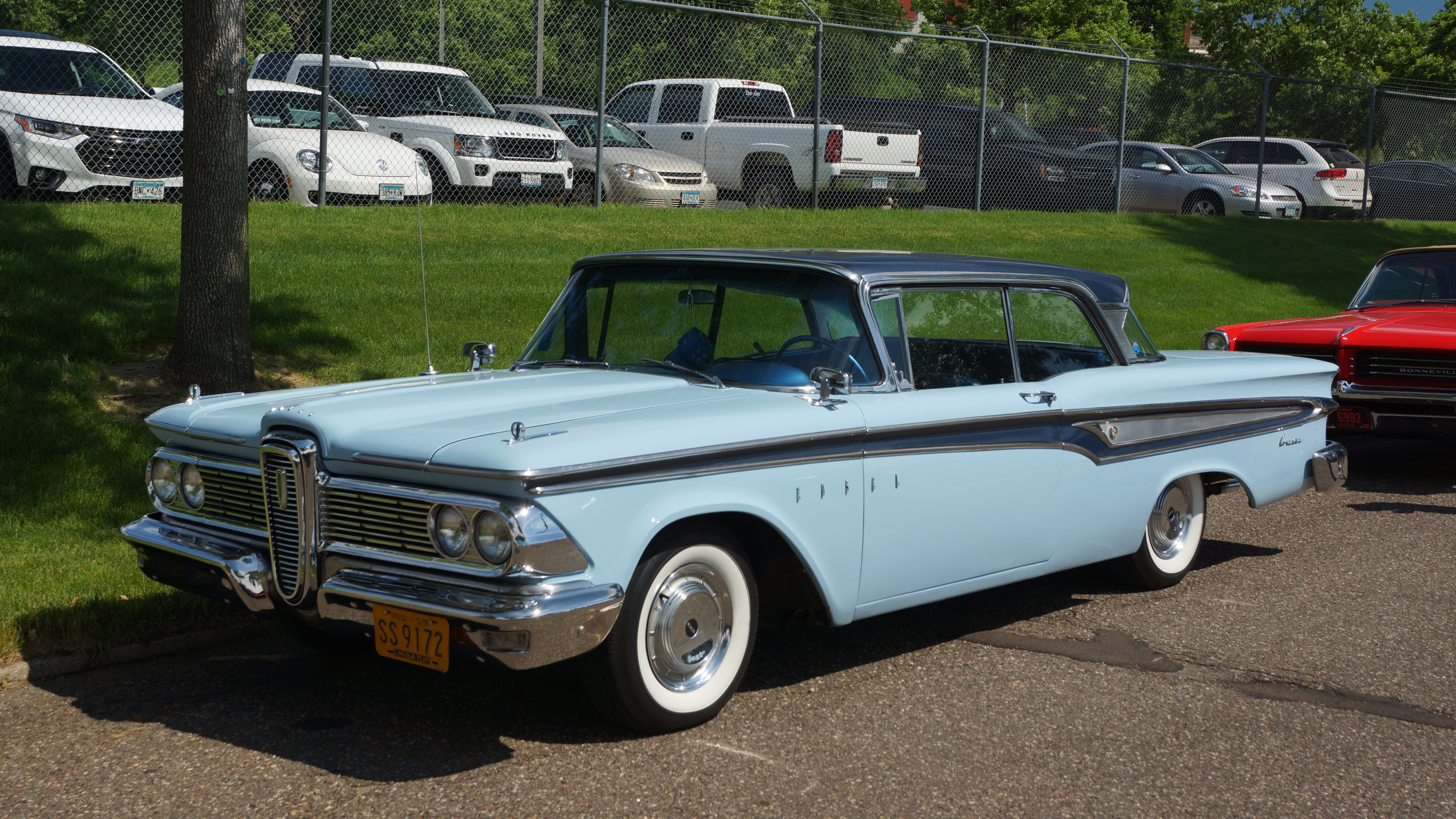
- 1959 Edsel Corsair 2-door hardtop

Overview
- Model years: 1959
- Assembly: Louisville, Kentucky USA; Oakville, Ontario, Canada

Body and chassis
- Body style: 2-door convertible 2-door coupe 2-door hardtop 4-door hardtop 4-door sedan
- Related: Edsel Ranger; Edsel Villager; Ford Galaxie; Ford Fairlane; Ford Custom; Ford Country Squire

Powertrain
- Engine: 332 cu in (5.4 L) FE V8
- Transmission: 3-speed manual 2-speed automatic

Dimensions
- Wheelbase: 120.0 in (3,048 mm)
- Length: 210.9 in (5,357 mm)
- Width: 79.8 in (2,027 mm)
- Height: 56.2 in (1,427 mm); Convertible: 56.7 in (1,440 mm)

The 1959 Edsels were introduced in the fall of 1958. However, for the 1959 model year, the Citation and Pacer models were dropped from Edsel's model range for 1959, as was the trouble-prone Teletouch system.

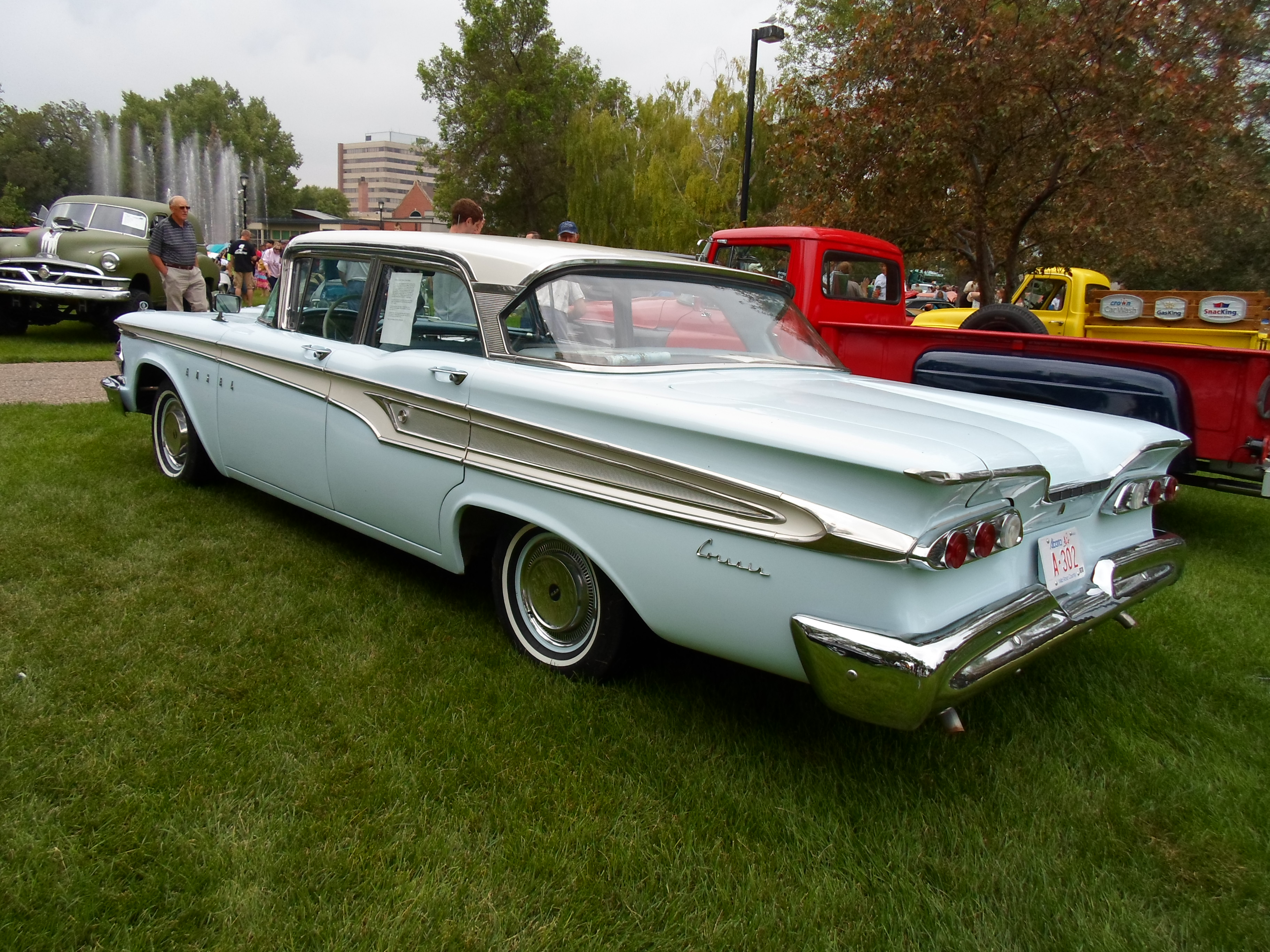
1959 Edsel Corsair 4-door sedan rear

The 1959 Edsel styling was significantly toned down, as was the vertical grille assembly, which now featured a fine bar pattern. The Corsair now represented the premium Edsel model range, replacing the discontinued Citation. Unlike in 1958, the Corsair now shared its body panels with the Ranger - the two being differentiated by trim and options. The Corsair also gained four-door sedan and convertible versions. The entire series was based on the 1959 Ford Fairlane 500.

The 1959 Corsair rode on a 120-in (3048-mm) wheelbase and the 361 cu in (5.9 L) FE V8 was standard in sedans, with either a two- or four-barrel carburetor as was a three-speed manual transmission. Replacing the Teletouch transmission was the Mile-O-Matic, a two-speed automatic, or Dual-Power Drive three-speed automatic (only available with the 361). The heater, defroster, and radio remained optional, as well.

With total 1959 Corsair output at 9,318, the Corsair was discontinued. For 1959, 2,468 hardtop coupes (2,315 U.S./153 Canada), 1,812 four-door hardtops (1,694 U.S./118 Canada), 1,343 convertibles (all U.S.) and 3,695 four-door sedans (3,301 U.S./394 Canada), were produced; hardtop sales were down 31% in two-doors and 71% in four-doors against 1958. Prices ranged from US$2,812 to $3,072, down some 15% from the previous year.

Production Figures for 1959 Edsel Corsair
| Body Style | Units |
|---|---|
| 2-Door Convertible | 1,343 |
| 2-Door Hardtop Coupe | 2,468 |
| 4-Door Hardtop | 1,812 |
| 4-Door Sedan | 3,694 |
| Total | 9,318 |

== 1960 prototype ==
Although a 1960 Corsair was never produced, Ford did originally consider offering it as a deluxe upgrade from the Ranger series. At least one prototype was produced, a two-door hardtop based on the Ford Galaxie Starliner. The prototype featured the 1960 Edsel grille, but with a huge vertical chrome bar at its center, rising above the hood line. Extra chrome trim along the sides (allowing for two-toning or a wide bright insert) was added, and the interior featured upgraded, contoured seats.

Although the 1960 Corsair was cancelled before production, the upgraded interior was available as an option on Rangers.
