= Teletouch =

Transmission controls on Ford Edsel cars

Teletouch is the trade name for the transmission controls found on many Edsel brand automobiles manufactured by the Edsel and Mercury-Edsel-Lincoln (M-E-L) Divisions of the Ford Motor Company. The significance of the Teletouch systems lies in its conception, design and symbolism for American automobiles produced in the 1950s, and the gadgets designed into them. The main distinguishing feature of the system was its use of push buttons on the steering wheel to shift gears as opposed to a gear stick.

== Conception ==
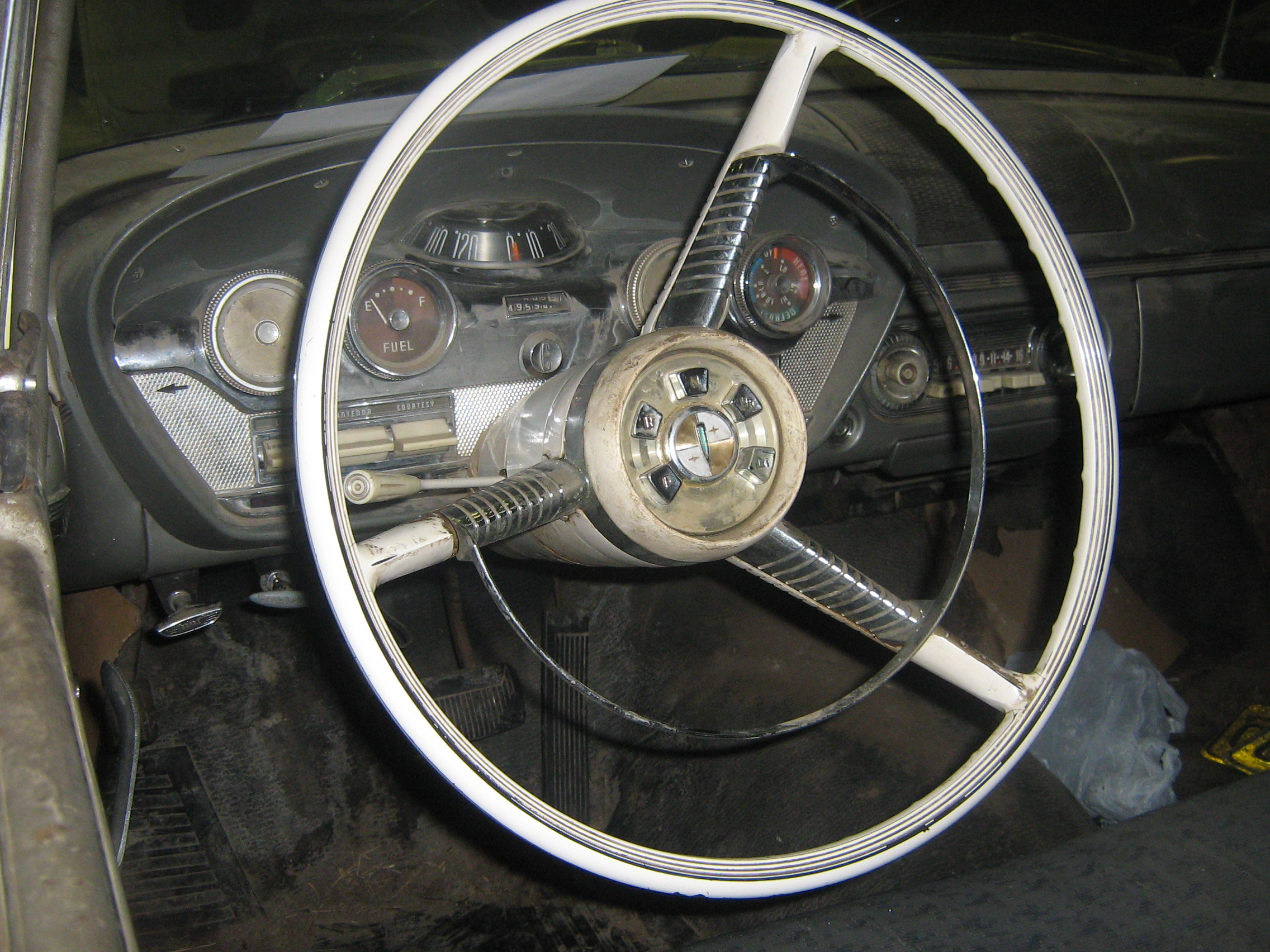
Edsel Ranger interior, showing the Teletouch system

Conception of the Edsel began in the early 1950s when Ford Motor Company attempted to outflank industry leader General Motors through altering its production, pricing and its make and model ranges. One of the results of this plan was the E-car program that resulted in the ill-fated Edsel.

From the beginning, the Edsel was promised to be something very different from the cars that Detroit was turning out at the time. However, development costs required that Edsel share the basics of other established Ford brands on the market. In this climate, the Edsel emerged as a five-model, three-wheelbase automobile line. Senior Edsels would share their chassis with Mercury, junior models would share their chassis with Ford passenger vehicles, and station wagons would share their chassis and body structure with Ford's station wagon range.

The distinction offered by the Edsel, therefore, was in the styling details. While the famed 'horse collar' grille and 'boomerang' tail lights made the Edsel visually unique, the Teletouch transmission and saucer-like spinning speedometer emerged as two of the better-remembered interior details.

== Design ==
The first electrical gear shift mechanism sold on new automobiles was the Vulcan electric gear shift system, a solenoid-driven transmission shift device for a standard sliding gear gearbox introduced in the summer of 1913. Among the automakers to offer the Vulcan system were the Haynes Automobile Company of Kokomo, Indiana; the S.G.V. Company of Reading, Pennsylvania; and the Norwalk Motor Car Company of Martinsburg, West Virginia. While the Vulcan shifter was often advertised as standard equipment on the Haynes car, a common floor shift was also available for $200 less.

Norwalk made the Vulcan system available on their products, such as the Underslung Six, as an option. Approximately 25 of those cars were so equipped. A large nickel-plated box was attached to the right side of the steering column which housed the push button mechanism. It utilized six buttons – first through third gear, reverse, neutral and park. There was a "signal" button which was the horn. A housing containing four large solenoids was mounted at the transmission which acted on the steel transmission shift control rods. The driver was free to select any gear at will, enabling the bypassing of gears, such as jumping from first to third gear without going through second gear.

There was a cautionary advisory with the car that one must use care when placing the selector into reverse, only doing so when the car was completely stopped. Pushing a button on the shift control preselected the chosen gear. The electrical circuit was closed only after the driver fully depressed the clutch pedal. This energized the appropriate transmission mounted solenoids necessary for returning the transmission to neutral and then completing engagement of the preselected gear. The driver would then release the clutch pedal to continue onwards.

These seemed to have been very advanced automotive systems. The Vulcan Electric Shift Company was located in Philadelphia, Pennsylvania and was eventually bought out by Cutler-Hammer. The model year 1914 was the only year that Norwalk used this system. Only one known Norwalk Motor Car survives today, which is owned by the friends of the Norwalk Foundation, Inc. in Martinsburg. Haynes was evidently the only automaker of note to place the push-buttons in the center of the steering wheel. The Vulcan electric gear shift system probably didn't survive past the early 1920s, since nothing regarding it has been found in the automotive engineering literature past 1921, and a 1919 Haynes print ad has been found with no mention of the electric shifting system.

Chrysler Corporation automobiles introduced pushbutton automatic transmission controls for their PowerFlite and Torqueflite transmissions for the 1956 model year. Instead of the traditional placement of a gear selector on the column, Chrysler's system mounted the gear buttons in dashboard pods to the left of the steering wheel, becoming the first U.S. carmaker to offer such a system. This system was mechanical. Packard also introduced a steering-column-mounted electro-mechanical pushbutton transmission control pod in its "Touch Button Ultramatic" in 1956, placed off to the right of the column about 6 in (15 cm). Using technology that it purchased from a Packard supplier, Auto-Lite, this push-button system proved problematic as the electric motor was insufficient to move the car out of Park on a steep hill, and would pop the circuit breaker; electrical contact problems, wiring problems and other issues were prevalent even when new; and the problems worsened with age.

The Mercury Division of Ford Motor Company, later, in 1957, the Lincoln-Mercury Division, followed suit with its purely mechanical push-button transmission control system in 1957 called "Keyboard Control" then in 1958 it was revised and called "Multi-Drive".

When the 1958 Edsel launched in the late summer of 1957, the Edsel became the first and only Ford division to launch an electro-mechanical push-button transmission system, which it trademarked as Teletouch. Teletouch placed the transmission buttons in a ring within the center of the steering wheel. Edsel's marketing department promoted the Teletouch as a logical progression in the process of making the steering wheel the central command center for controlling cars. Marketing also pointed out that more of the dashboard view was unrestricted to the driver with the gear handle removed. Edsel even issued a Teletouch "face-mask" for dealers to wear and pass out as an advertising premium promoting the system to would-be buyers.

While a standard gear selector was available as a reduced-cost option for the automatic transmission on the Edsel Ranger, Pacer and station wagon models, Corsair and Citation models came standard with Teletouch.

== Execution ==
In theory, the idea of the Teletouch system made sense, but in its execution, the system quickly became the bane of the Edsel and its owners. Many new car buyers, and most automotive writers, found Teletouch to be a gimmick, while others found it distracting or confusing. Despite its marketing talking points, it required the driver to remove a hand from the steering wheel rim to push a center-pod button.

Reliability proved poor due to the servo motor's hot, wet and dirty operating environment between the bell housing and the exhaust pipe just above the road surface, and the somewhat troublesome associated relays, switches, wiring and connectors. On the other hand, the wiring inside the steering column did not move and was extremely reliable, since the pod containing the buttons did not turn with the wheel. The electric control current flowed through a set of slip rings and brush contacts, while the Teletouch buttons were held in the correct position with Neutral at 12 o'clock through a set of planetary gears in the steering column. The steering wheel was directly coupled to the steering linkage as with conventional steering columns.

Eventually, all push-button transmission selectors became a safety issue due to lack of industry-wide standardization. In addition, since the 1920s the center of the steering wheel had typically held the horn button. While some cars of the late 50s had horn rings, some drivers instinctively hit the steering wheel center in an emergency, sometimes causing them to either damage the controls or cause an unexpected, hazardous gear change, occasionally causing transmission damage. The Edsel's system included an electro-hydraulic inhibitor switch activated by transmission fluid pressure which virtually eliminated the possibility of this happening.

The single circumstance under which a Teletouch could be put into gear with the car moving at greater than three to five miles per hour was if the neutral button was depressed first, thereby removing hydraulic pressure from the inhibitor switch, and then the reverse or park button pushed. These actions would, as a result, either shear off the parking pawl or suddenly set the rear wheels turning in the reverse direction, effectively locking them up against the road surface and possibly damaging the reverse bands in the transmission. Ironically, the failed Autolite Packard system protected against this set of circumstances by locking out not only reverse and park, but also neutral while the car was moving with any significant speed.

For the 1959 model year, Edsel dropped Teletouch as an option, and began the process of abandoning the automotive market by dropping its Mercury-based cars, and eliminating the Citation, and Pacer cars as well as the Bermuda and Roundup station wagons.

Steering wheel-mounted transmission controls have made a comeback since the mid-1990s introduction of Porsche's Tiptronic system, although the controls for the selection of park, reverse, and neutral are almost always located elsewhere. They also invariably have the buttons or "paddles" for the functions that are on the steering wheel quite near the rim, for true "both-hands-on-the-wheel" functionality.
