= David Wallace (executive) =

David Wallace (October 6, 1908 – October 6, 1974 in Taormina, Sicily), was hired in 1955 by Ford Motor Company as manager of product planning and merchandising for its major new car line debuting in 1957. At the end the name chosen was Edsel.

Given the responsibility of researching potential names and being frustrated by conventional research, Wallace secured the aid of poet Marianne Moore who did not disappoint with such suggestions as Mongoose Civique, Resilient Bullet, Andante con Moto and Utopian Turtletop among others. The entire correspondence was later reproduced in The New Yorker (April 13, 1957, p. 130–136). It was up to Wallace to inform Moore of Ford's final choice which he did in this pungent letter:

November 8, 1956

Dear Miss Moore,

Because you were so kind to us in our early and hopeful days of looking for a suitable name, I feel a deep obligation to report on events that have ensued.

And I feel I must do so before the public announcement of same come Monday, November 19.

We have chosen a name out of the more than six thousand-odd candidates that we gathered. It has a certain ring to it. It fails somewhat of the resonance, gaiety, and zest we were seeking. But it has a personal dignity and meaning to many of us here. Our name, dear Miss Moore, is—Edsel.

I hope you will understand.

Cordially,

David Wallace,

Special Products Division

Wallace later wrote of his experiences with Ford Motor Co. in Automotive Quarterly, "Something went wrong. History had never witnessed anything like it before. More money was spent in its launching than any other previous product offered upon the consumer market anywhere – a quarter of a billion dollars. It was to be the most perfectly conceived automobile the world had ever seen – every part of its planning guided by public opinion polls, motivational research, Science. It did not work out that way". (Automobile Quarterly, 1975, Vol. XIII, No. 2, "Naming the Edsel", p. 182–191)

== Career ==
- Time magazine, manager of promotion research, 1939–1949
- Ford International, manager of foreign marketing research, 1949–1951
- Crossley Inc., vice president 1952–1953
- Ogilvy, Benson & Mather, Inc., advertising agency, manager of market research, 1954–1955
- Ford Motor Co. (Edsel Division), manager of marketing research of product planning and merchandising of the Special Products Division, 1955–1958
- President of the American Association for Public Opinion Research, 1958–1959
- In 1962, Wallace earned his PhD in sociology from Columbia University and returned to the world of academia

== Publications ==
- First Tuesday: A Study of Rationality in Voting, (Doubleday, 1964), a statistical study of the voting habits of the citizens of Westport, Connecticut.
- American Journal of Sociology, LXIX, (September 1963), "A Tribute to the Second Sigma" (presidential address to the American Association for Public Opinion Research), Public Opinion Quarterly, Fall 1959, p 311-325
- Letters From and To the Ford Motor Company, Marianne Moore, David Wallace, The Pierpont Morgan Library, 1958
- Automobile Quarterly, 1975, Vol. XIII, No. 2, "Naming the Edsel", p. 182-191

== Sources ==
- The New Yorker, April 13, 1957, pp 130–136
- Ford, The Men and the Machine, Robert Lacey, 1986, Ballantine Books, NY, p 504-511
- Time, April 22, 1957, Vol. LXIX, No 16k, p 96
- Madison Avenue USA, Martin Mayer, Pocket Books, Inc. 1958 (orig. published by Harper & Brothers), p 109, 111-113, 118, 122, 184
- Carlson, Peter (September 4, 2007). "The Flop Heard Round the World; That Name. That Grille. Ford Had High Expectations, but When the Edsel Debuted in 1957, It Became America's Most-Hyped Failure". The Washington Post. Archived from the original on November 18, 2018 – via HighBeam Research.
