= Lifeguard (automobile safety) =

Safety upgrade package offered from 1956 by Ford Motor Company

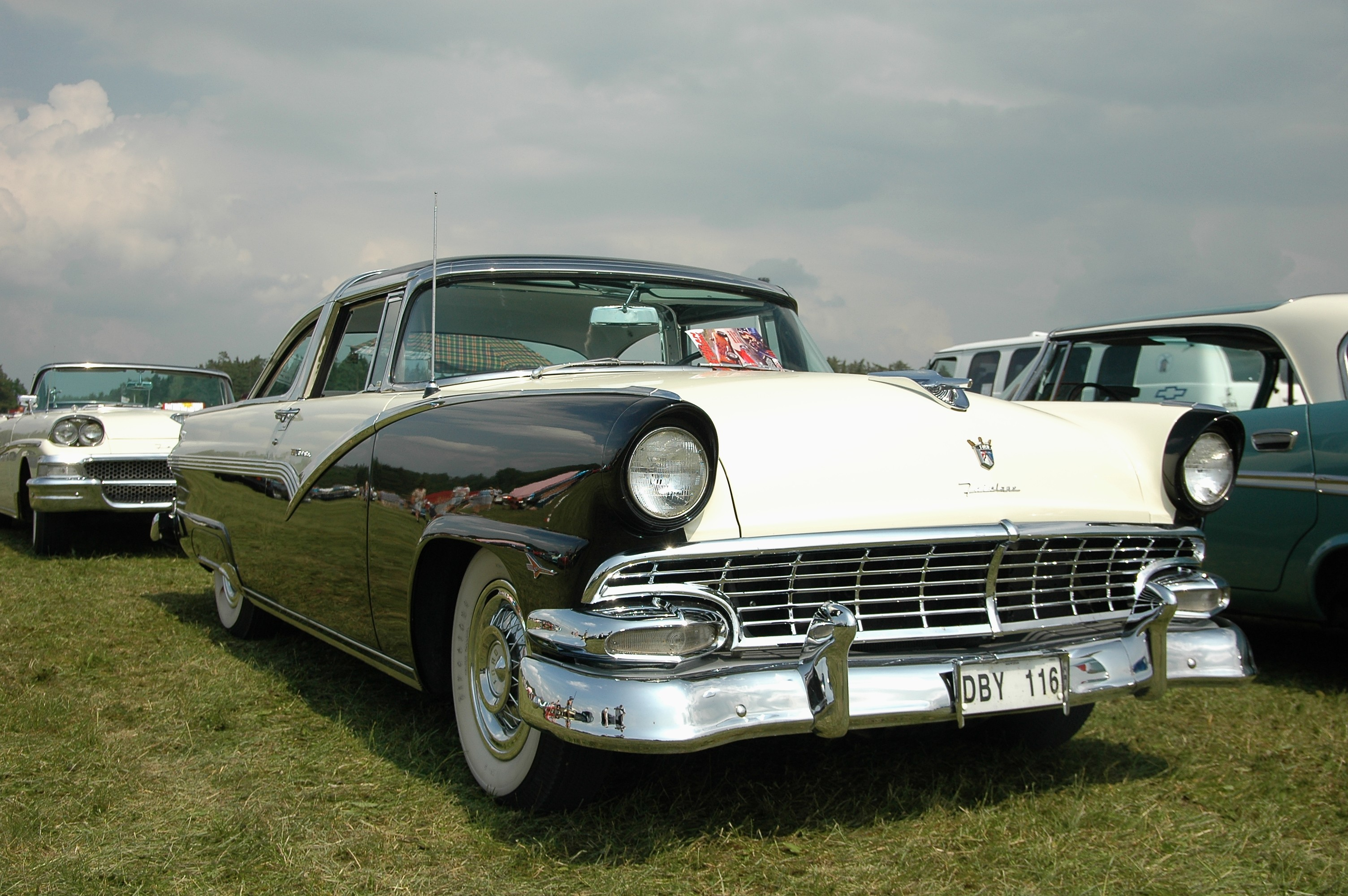
A 1956 Ford Fairlane Crown Victoria. The Lifeguard package was available for this model.

Lifeguard was the name of a 1956 safety package marketed by the Ford Motor Company. It received an additional update in 1957.

== Features ==
Spurred by Robert McNamara, the Cornell University crash research program and the first year of Ford's own crash testing in 1955, the Lifeguard package included:

- Three standard features:
  - A safety "deep-center" steering wheel with spokes that would flex.
  - Safety "double-grip" door latches to prevent occupant ejection in case of a crash.
  - A safety rearview mirror to reduce broken glass if shattered.
- Two optional features:
  - Front and rear lap only seat belts, first offered by Ford in 1955.
  - Padded dashboard and sun visors. The padding was advertised as being more absorbent than foam rubber. The instruments were recessed to minimize injury potential.

According to some, the buying public was unresponsive to the Lifeguard package, prompting Henry Ford II to say: McNamara is selling safety, but Chevrolet is selling cars. However, Ralph Nader and Joan Claybrook dispute this, claiming that the package was extremely popular.

== 1957 update ==
In 1957, Ford updated the Lifeguard safety package with a new frame that bowed out to provide greater coverage of the passengers, rear child-proof door locks, a front hinged hood to protect against the hood flying up in the wind, and recessed knobs.

== Sources ==
- 1956 Crown Victoria
- The Outsider. How Robert McNamara changed the automobile industry
- Lifeguard Design, original publicity shots
