= Edsel Bermuda =

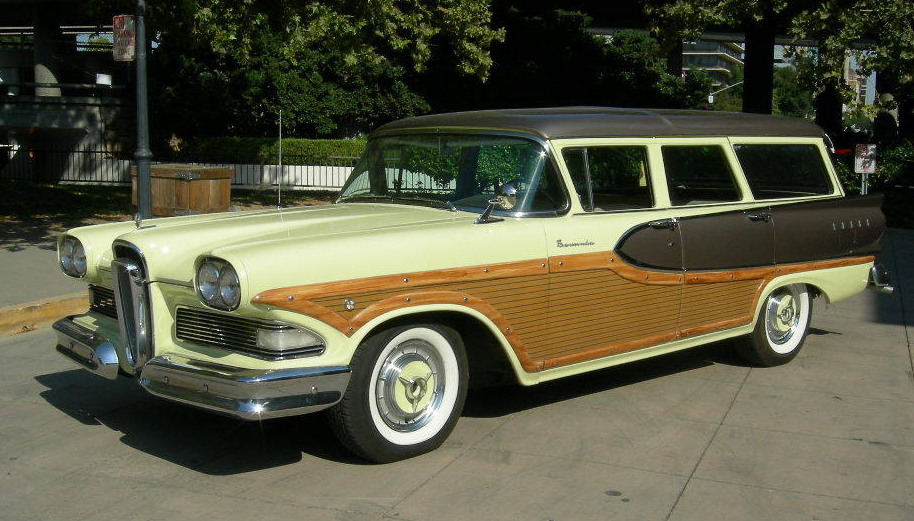

Overview
- Manufacturer: Edsel (Ford)
- Model years: 1958
- Assembly: Mahwah, New Jersey; Louisville, Kentucky; San Jose, California
- Designer: Roy Brown Jr.

Body and chassis
- Class: Full-size
- Body style: 4-door station wagon
- Related: Edsel Pacer; Edsel Ranger; Edsel Villager; Edsel Roundup; Ford Fairlane; Ford Custom; Ford Country Squire

Powertrain
- Engine: 361 cu in (5.9 L) FE V8
- Transmission: 3-speed manual 3-speed automatic

Dimensions
- Wheelbase: 116 in (2,946 mm)
- Curb weight: 4,100 lb (1,860 kg)

The Edsel Bermuda is a station wagon that was produced and sold by Edsel in 1958. Like the Edsel Villager and Edsel Roundup station wagons, the Bermuda was built on a 116-inch (2,946 mm) wheelbase shared with Ford's station wagons, as well as core body stampings.

== Overview ==
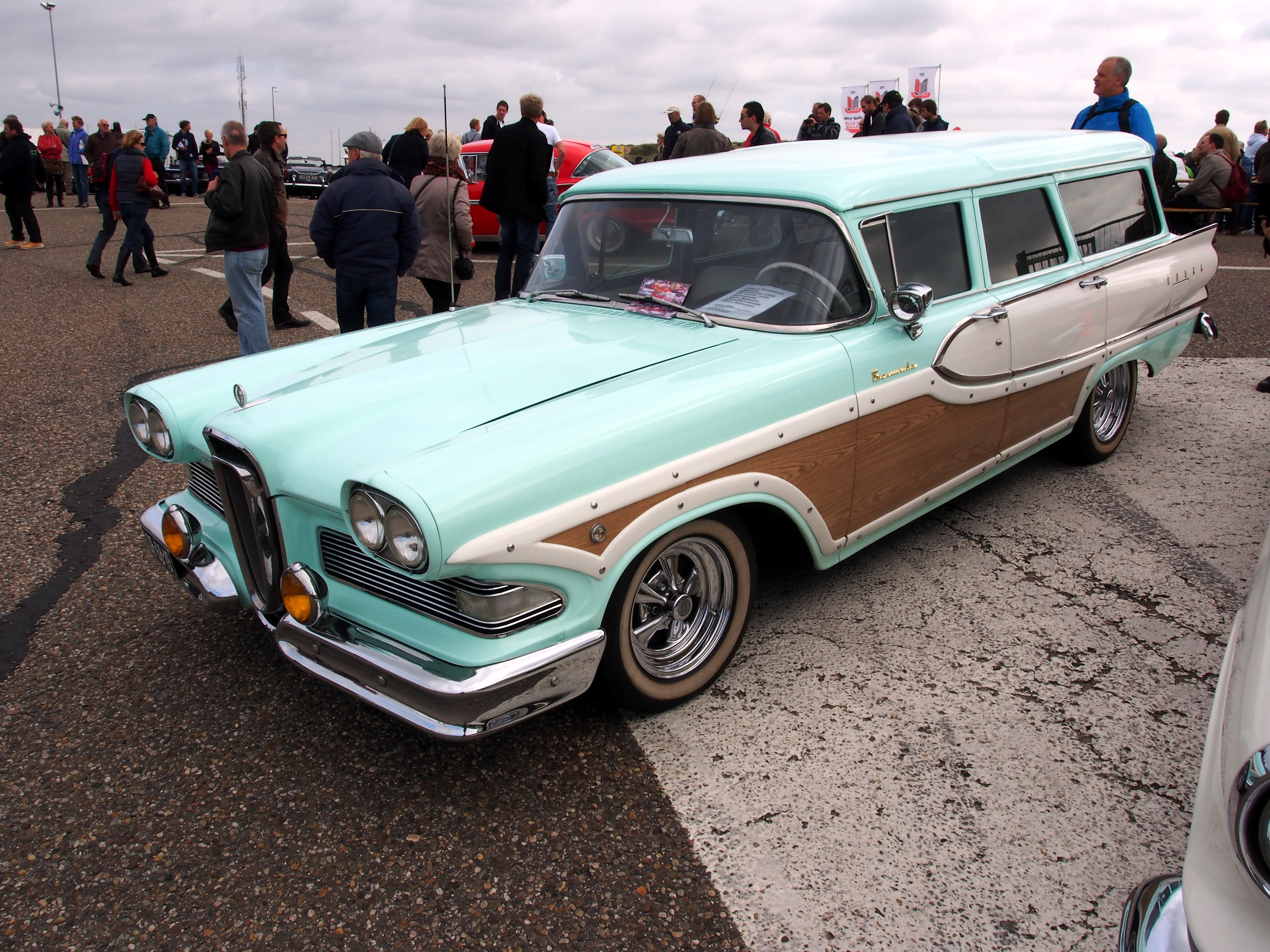
1958 Edsel Bermuda

The Bermuda represented the highest trim level available within the Edsel brand for a station wagon, and was only available during Edsel's introductory year of 1958. In addition to deluxe interior appointments, the Bermuda also was outfitted with simulated wood panels and frames, a hallmark of premium station wagon models produced by Ford and Mercury. The Bermuda came in six and nine-passenger configurations. To separate the Bermuda from Ford models, the Bermuda received Edsel's front fascia and vertical grille assembly as well as unique boomerang-shaped taillights. The shape of the taillights posed a problem when used as turn indicators – the left hand taillight appeared as an arrow pointing right and vice versa from a distance.

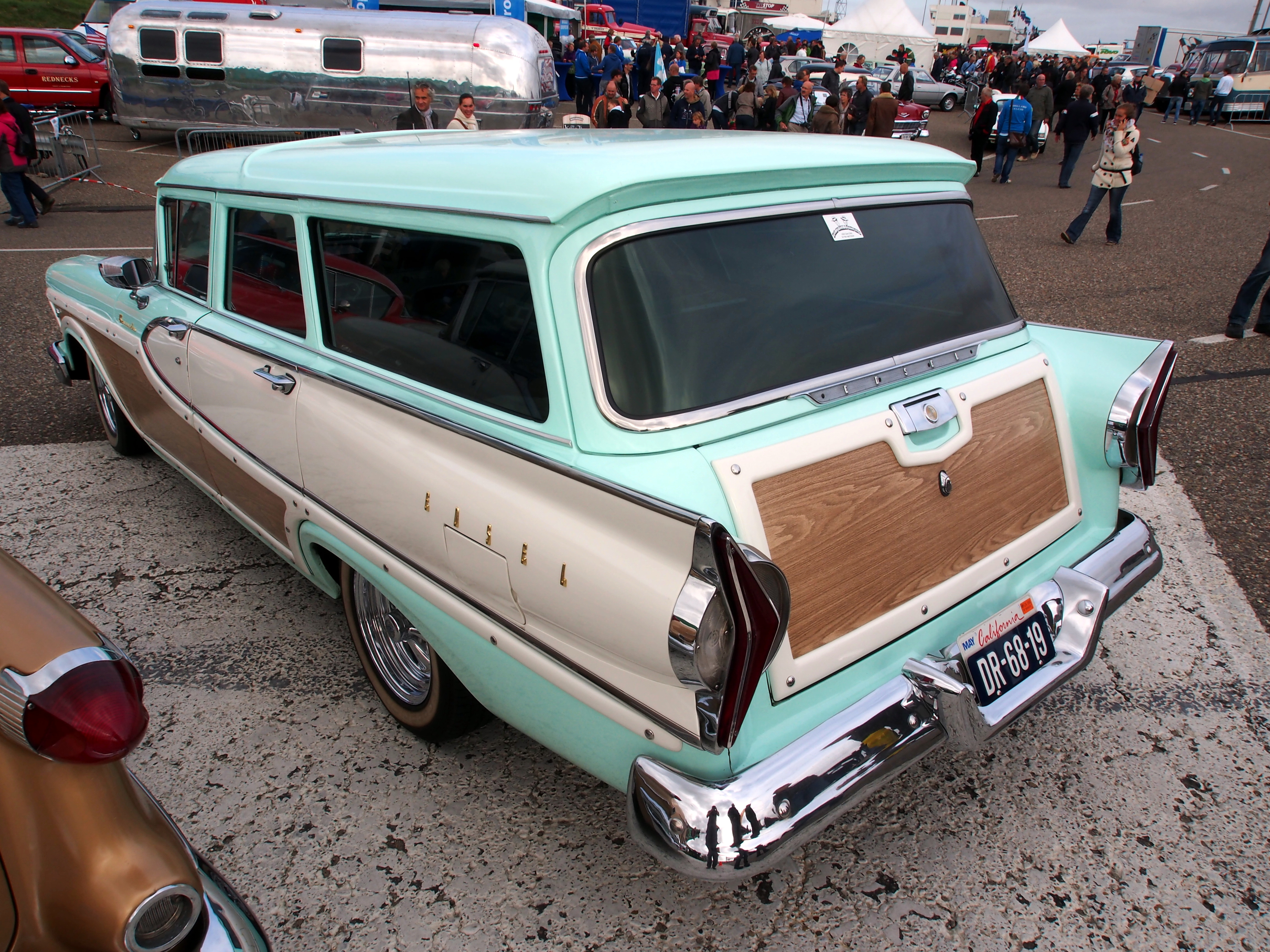
Edsel Bermuda rear view

All station wagons shared the Edsel Ranger's engine availability with a 361 cu in (5.9 L) V8 as standard, as was a three-speed manual transmission. Buyers also had the option of a three-speed automatic transmission with a standard column-mounted gear selector, or could choose Edsel's highly promoted but trouble-prone Teletouch automatic, which placed its drive-selection buttons in a stationary steering wheel hub that the steering wheel rotated around.

While their roll-out was highly publicized in the fall of 1957, Edsels were a marketing disaster for Ford. Total Bermuda station wagon was 2,235 units, of which 1,456 were six-passenger models with a base price of $3,155 ($36,167 in 2025 dollars) and 779 were nine-passenger versions priced at $3,212 ($36,820 in 2025 dollars). This made the nine-passenger Bermuda the rarest 1958 Edsel model.

For the 1959 model year, the Bermuda and Roundup station wagons were dropped (as was the trouble-prone Teletouch system), leaving only the Villager as Edsel's sole station wagon model.

== Production numbers ==
Body Style	1958
6-Passenger Station Wagon	1,456
9-Passenger Station Wagon	779
Total	2,235
