= Edsel Roundup =

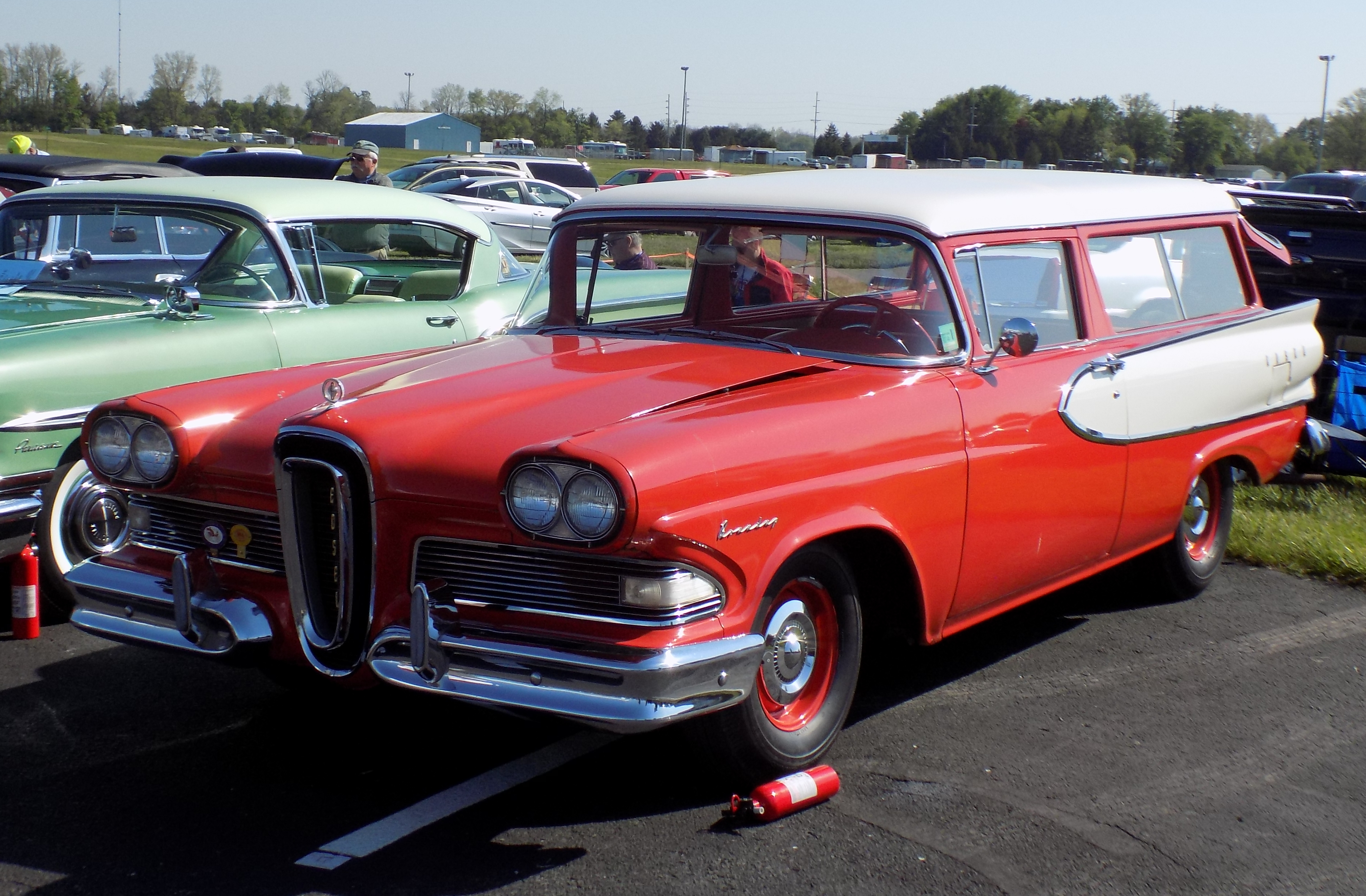

Overview
- Manufacturer: Edsel (Ford)
- Production: 1958
- Assembly: Mahwah, New Jersey; Louisville, Kentucky; San Jose, California
- Designer: Roy Brown Jr.

Body and chassis
- Class: Full-size
- Body style: 2-door station wagon
- Related: Edsel Pacer; Edsel Ranger; Edsel Bermuda; Edsel Villager; Ford Fairlane; Ford Custom; Ford Country Squire

Powertrain
- Engine: 361 cu in (5.9 L) FE V8
- Transmission: 3-speed manual 3-speed automatic

Dimensions
- Wheelbase: 116 in (2,946 mm)

The Edsel Roundup is a station wagon that was produced and sold by Edsel in 1958. Like the Villager and Bermuda station wagons, the Roundup was built on a 116-inch (2,946 mm) wheelbase shared with Ford's station wagons, as well as core body stampings. It had an approach angle of 21° and an overall length of 205.42 in.

The Roundup represented the base trim level available within the Edsel brand for a station wagon, and was only available during Edsel's introductory year of 1958. The Roundup was available only as a six-passenger two-door station wagon. The Roundup came with black rubber flooring, armrests, front and rear ashtrays, dome and courtesy lights, and a white vinyl headliner. A split-back front seat was standard to allow access to the back seat. In place of roll-down rear windows, the Roundup used sliding windows.

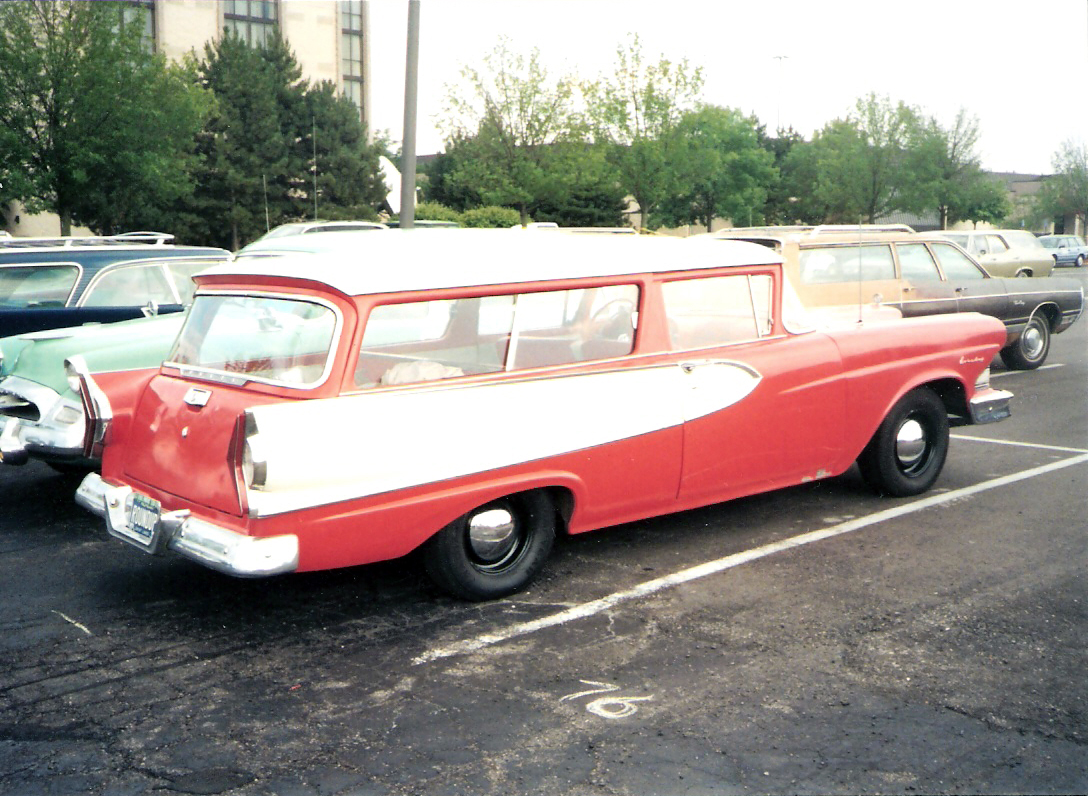
Rear view of the Edsel Roundup

To further separate the Roundup from the Ford Ranch Wagon on which it was based, the Roundup received Edsel's front fascia and grille assembly, as well as unique boomerang-shaped taillights. The shape of the taillights posed a problem when used as turn indicators – the left hand taillight appeared as an arrow pointing right and vice versa from a distance. All station wagons shared the Edsel Ranger's engine availability, with a 361 cubic inch V8 as standard, as was a three-speed manual transmission. Buyers also had the option of a three-speed automatic transmission with a standard column-mounted gear selector, or could choose Edsel's highly promoted but trouble-prone Teletouch automatic, which placed its drive-selection buttons in the steering wheel hub.

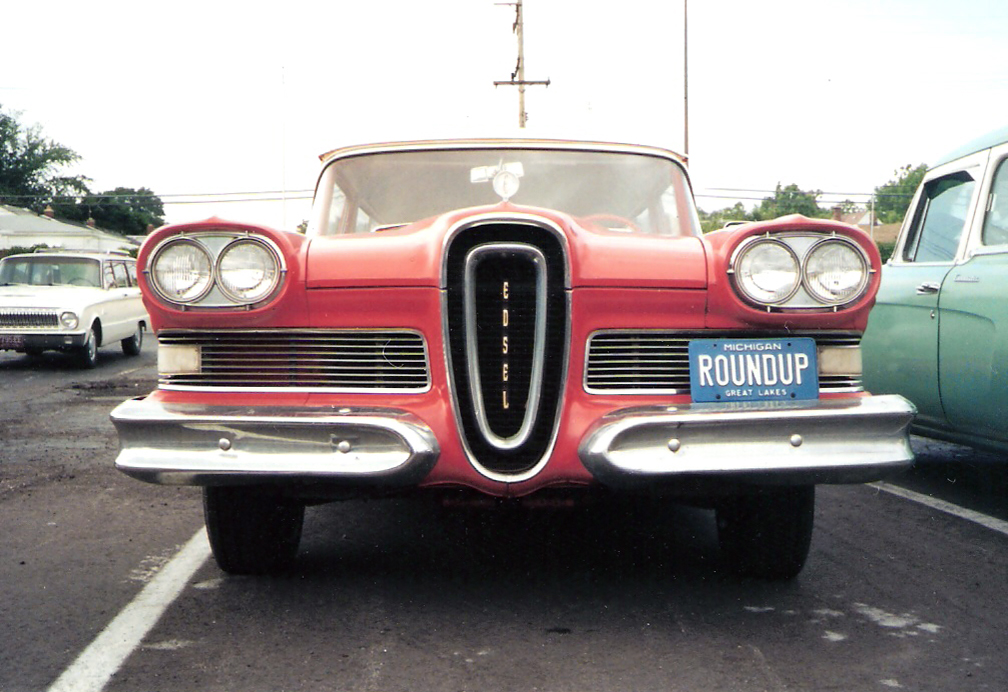
Front view of the Edsel Roundup, showing its controversial "horse collar" grille

While their roll-out was highly publicized in the fall of 1957, Edsels were a marketing disaster for Ford. Total output for the Roundup stood at 963 units. The low output number could be attributed to the declining popularity of two-door wagons in the American market and the Edsel's overall lack of consumer appeal. For the 1959 model year, the Roundup and the premium Bermuda station wagons were dropped, leaving the mid-value Villager as Edsel's sole station wagon model.
