= Edsel Villager =

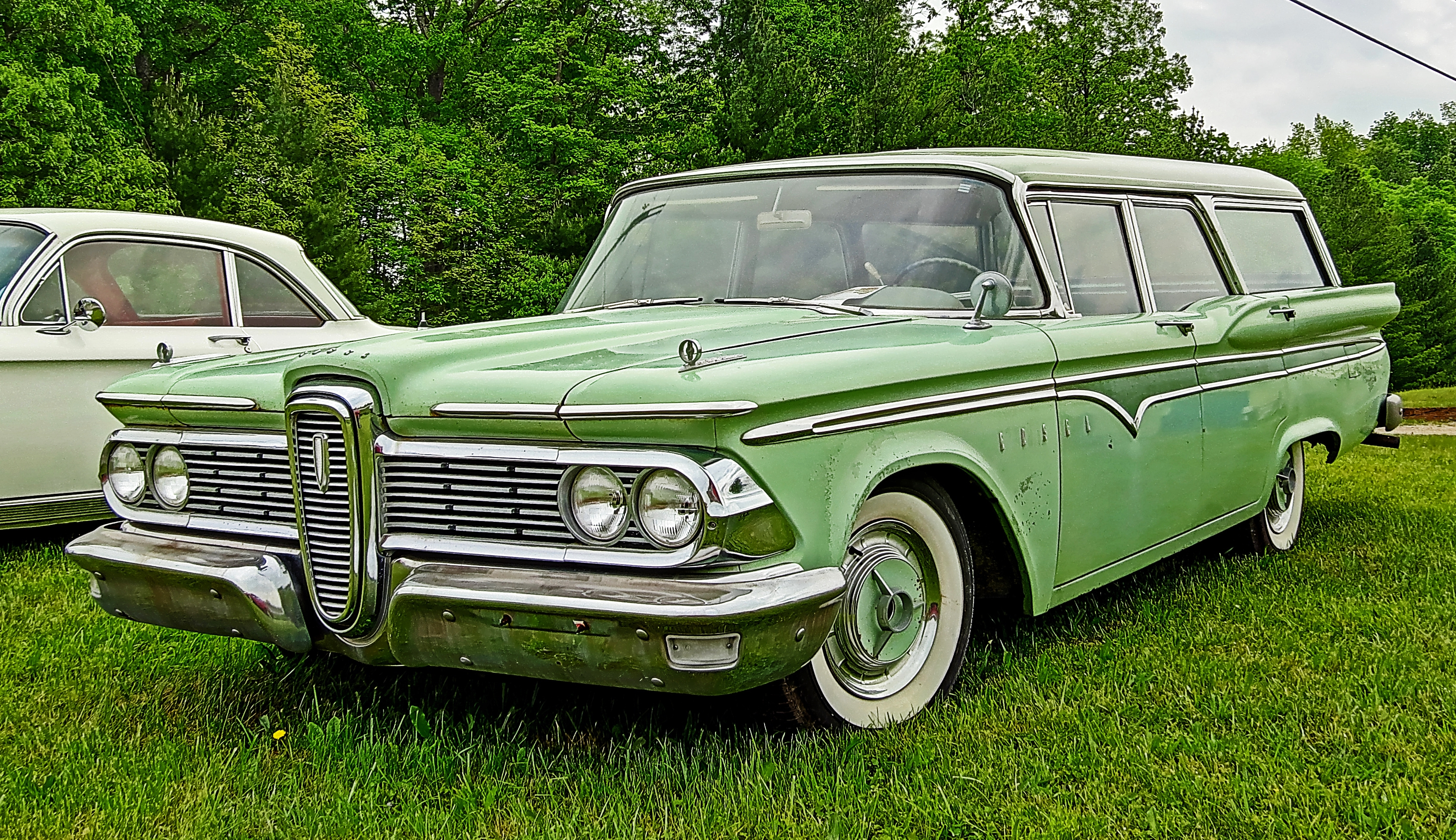
- 1959 Edsel Villager

Overview
- Manufacturer: Edsel (Ford)
- Production: 1958–1960
- Assembly: Mahwah, New Jersey; Louisville, Kentucky; San Jose, California
- Designer: Roy Brown Jr.

Body and chassis
- Class: Full-size
- Body style: 4-door station wagon
- Related: Edsel Ranger; Edsel Bermuda; Edsel Roundup; Ford Fairlane; Ford Country Sedan

Powertrain
- Engine: 361 cu in (5.9 L) FE V8
- Transmission: 3-speed manual 3-speed automatic

Dimensions
- Wheelbase: 1958–1959: 116.0 in (2,946 mm); 1960: 120.0 in (3,048 mm)

The Edsel Villager is a station wagon that was produced and sold by Edsel from 1958 to 1960. Introduced using the narrower Ford station wagon body, the Villager was a divisional counterpart of the Ford Country Sedan. As the Edsel Ranger was derived from the Ford Fairlane, the Villager shared much of its body stampings with the Country Sedan wagon.

Alongside the Ranger, the Villager was the only nameplate to survive Edsel's entire three-year lifespan as a Ford automobile brand. As with nearly every other Edsel nameplate, the Villager name saw further use in automotive production.

In addition to Louisville Assembly (the primary source of Edsels), the Villager was also assembled by Mahwah Assembly (Mahwah, New Jersey) and San Jose Assembly.

== Model overview ==
For its introduction, the Villager represented the intermediate Edsel station wagon offering; for much of its development, Ford originally had planned on using the Caravan nameplate. Slotted between the two-door Roundup and the premium Bermuda, the Villager was marketed only with a four-door body; six-passenger and nine-passenger versions were offered.

With Edsel wagons matched to Ford-based Edsel sedans (on a 116-inch station wagon wheelbase), the Villager was a counterpart of the Edsel Ranger, sharing its interior and exterior appointments. Like all other Edsel wagons, the Villager came with a two-piece tailgate. Seat belts were optional.

=== 1958 ===
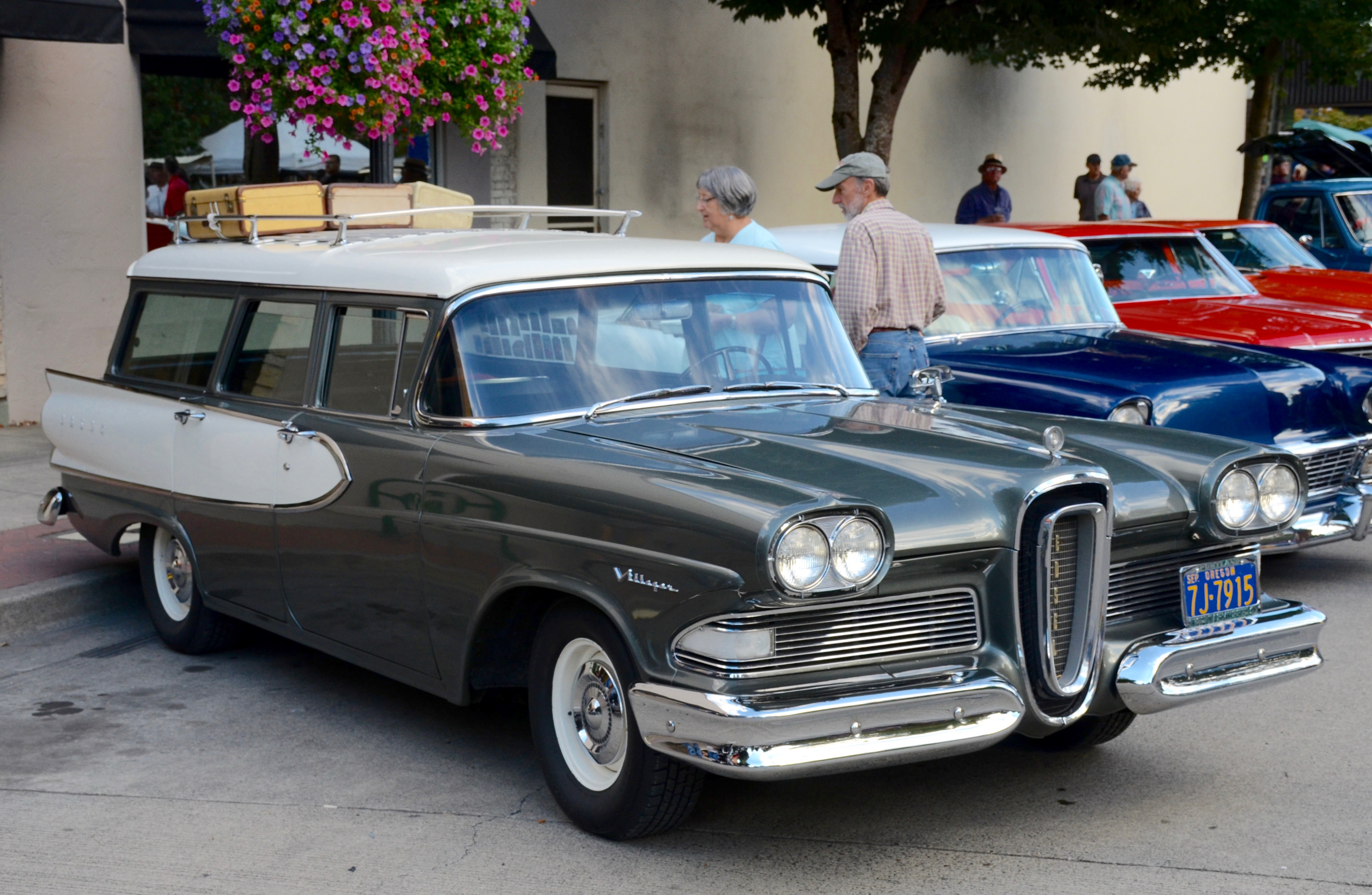
1958 Edsel Villager

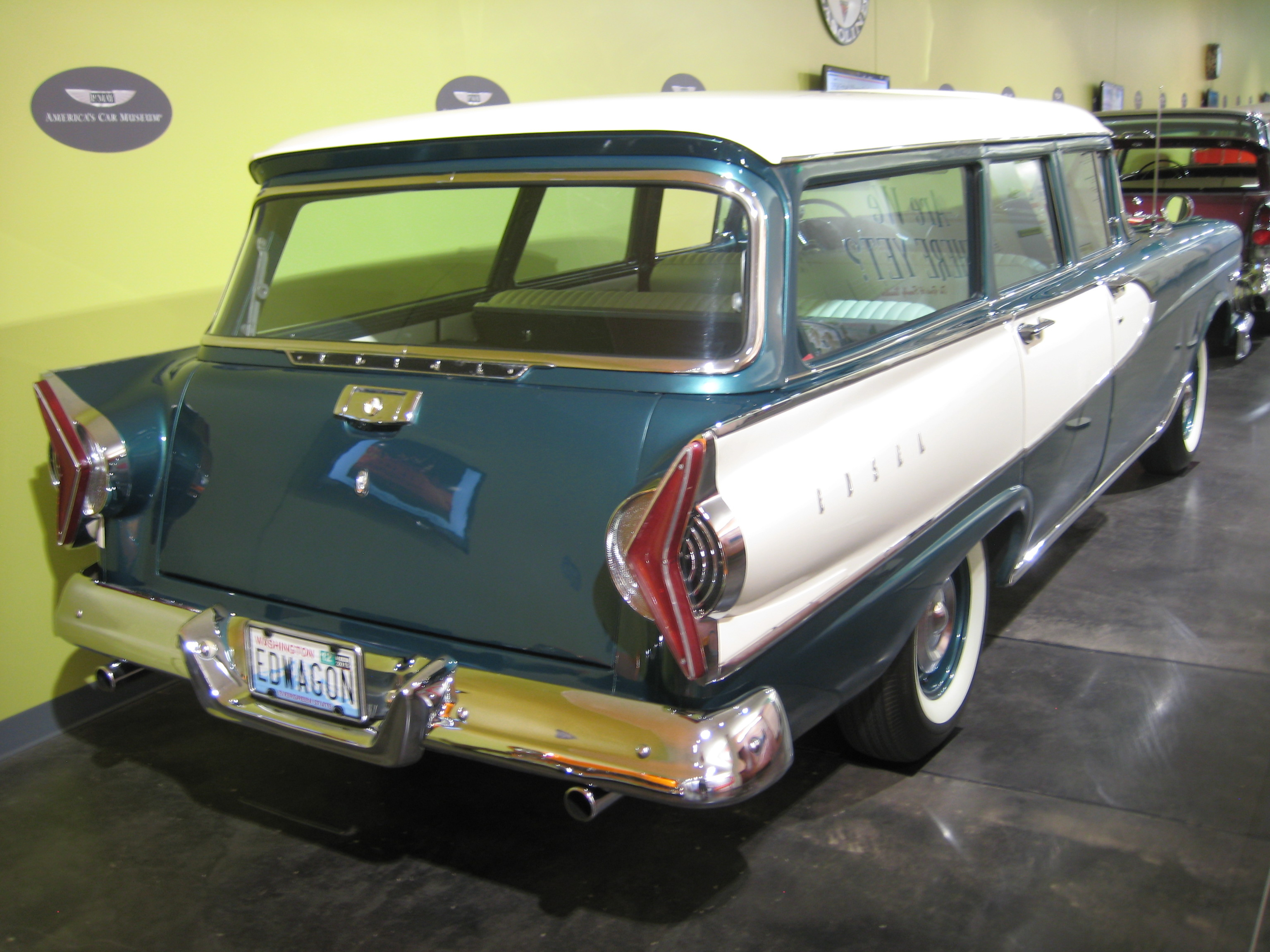
1958 Edsel Villager rear

To distinguish Edsel station wagons from their Ford counterparts (produced on the same assembly line), the Villager was produced with boomerang-shaped taillamps (separate from the traditional round Ford units or Mercury "delta" units). The shape of the taillamps posed a problem when used as turn indicators – the left-hand taillight appeared as an arrow pointing right and vice versa from a distance.

All Villagers were fitted with a 361 cubic-inch V8 (the largest engine offered with the Edsel Ranger). Alongside a standard 3-speed manual transmission, a 3-speed automatic was offered. In addition to a traditional column-mounted gear selector, the automatic transmission was offered with the division-exclusive (but trouble-prone) Teletouch gear selector, placing drive selection buttons in the steering wheel hub.

During its first year in production, Edsel sold more Villagers than Roundup and Bermuda station wagons combined.

=== 1959 ===
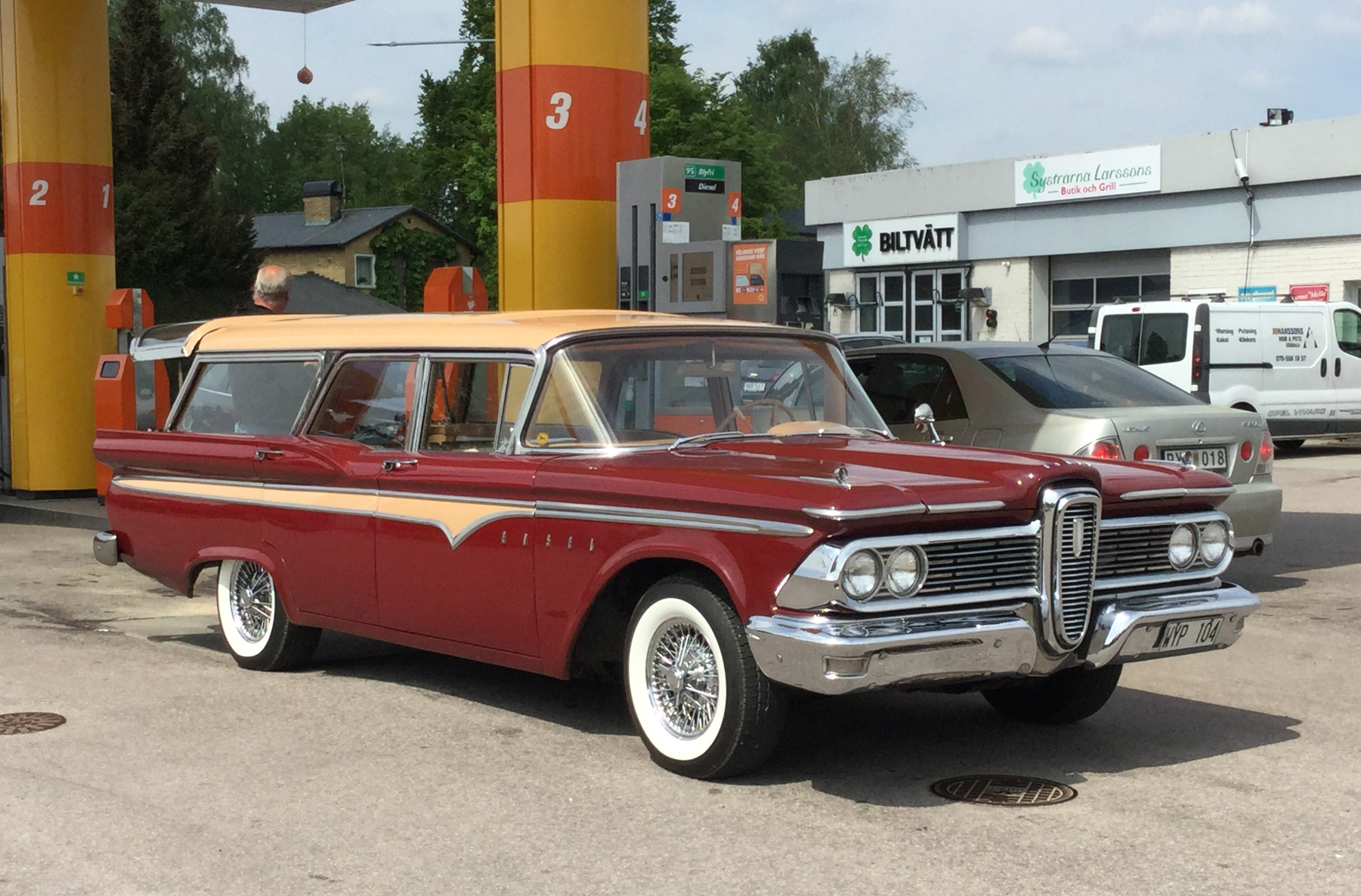
1959 Edsel Villager

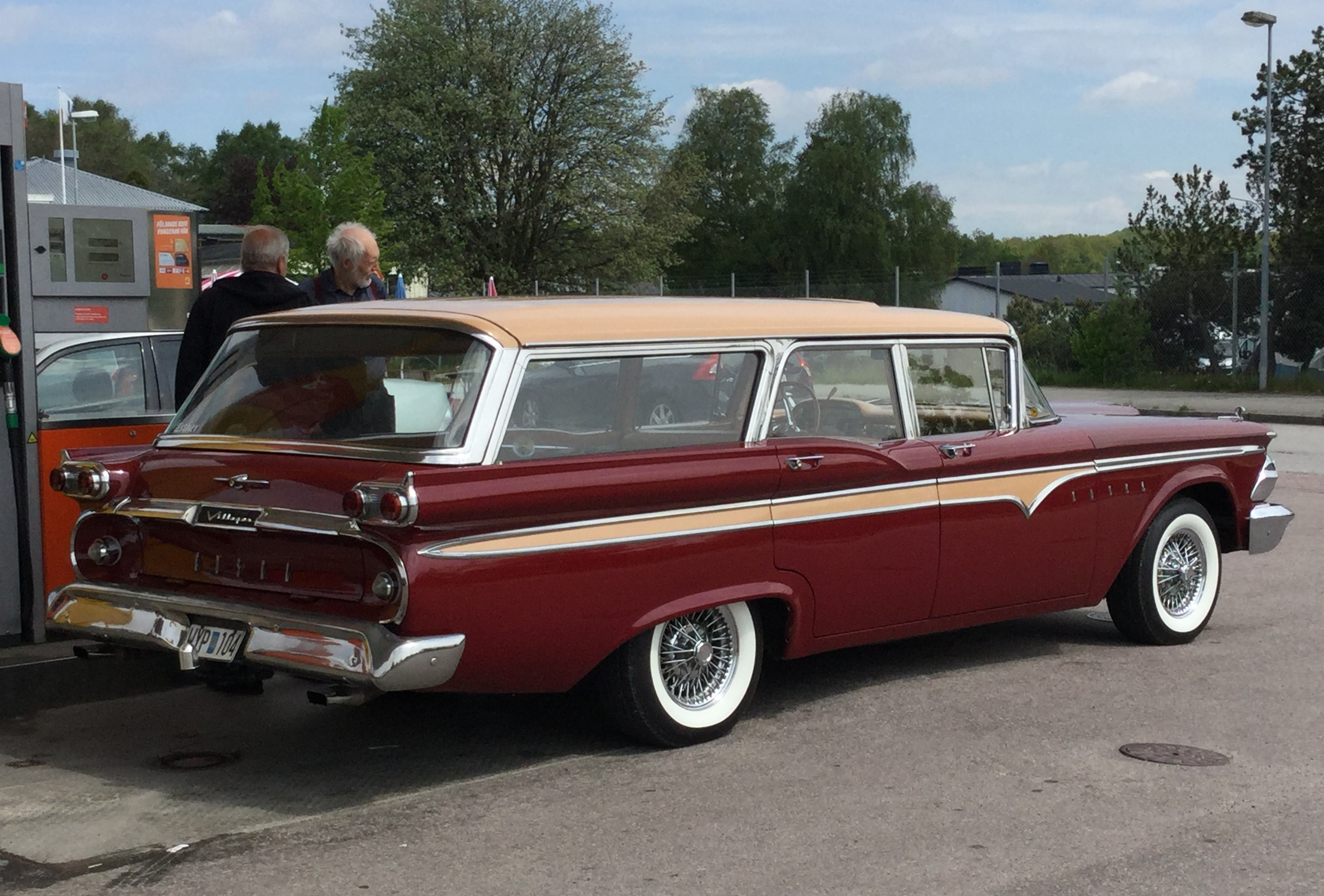
1959 Edsel Villager

For 1959, the Roundup and Bermuda were dropped, leaving the Villager as the sole Edsel station wagon line. Along with the Ranger, the Villager adopted a toned-down front fascia; though the grille retained its "horsecollar" design, it was better integrated into the body (along with the headlamps). Though visibly sharing nearly its entire rear bodywork with Ford, the confusing boomerang taillamps gave way to four round units and two reverse lamps, along with vestigial fins.

The Teletouch gear selector was discontinued, with all automatic transmissions adopting a column-mounted shifter.

Though Edsel declined in sales overall for 1959, the 7,820 Villagers sold for the year outpaced sales of all three model lines combined for 1958 by nearly 1,500 vehicles.

=== 1960 ===
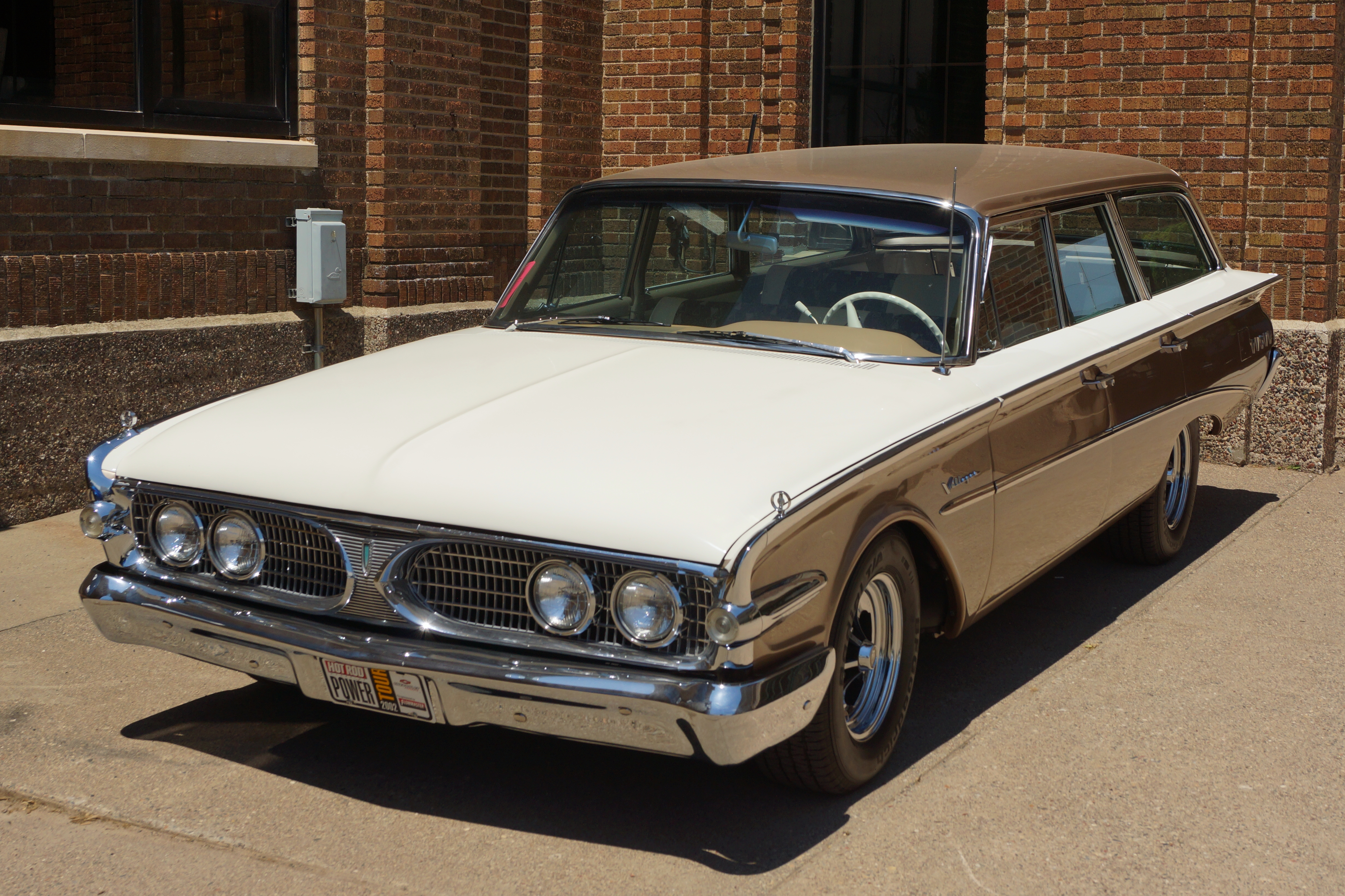
1960 Edsel Villager

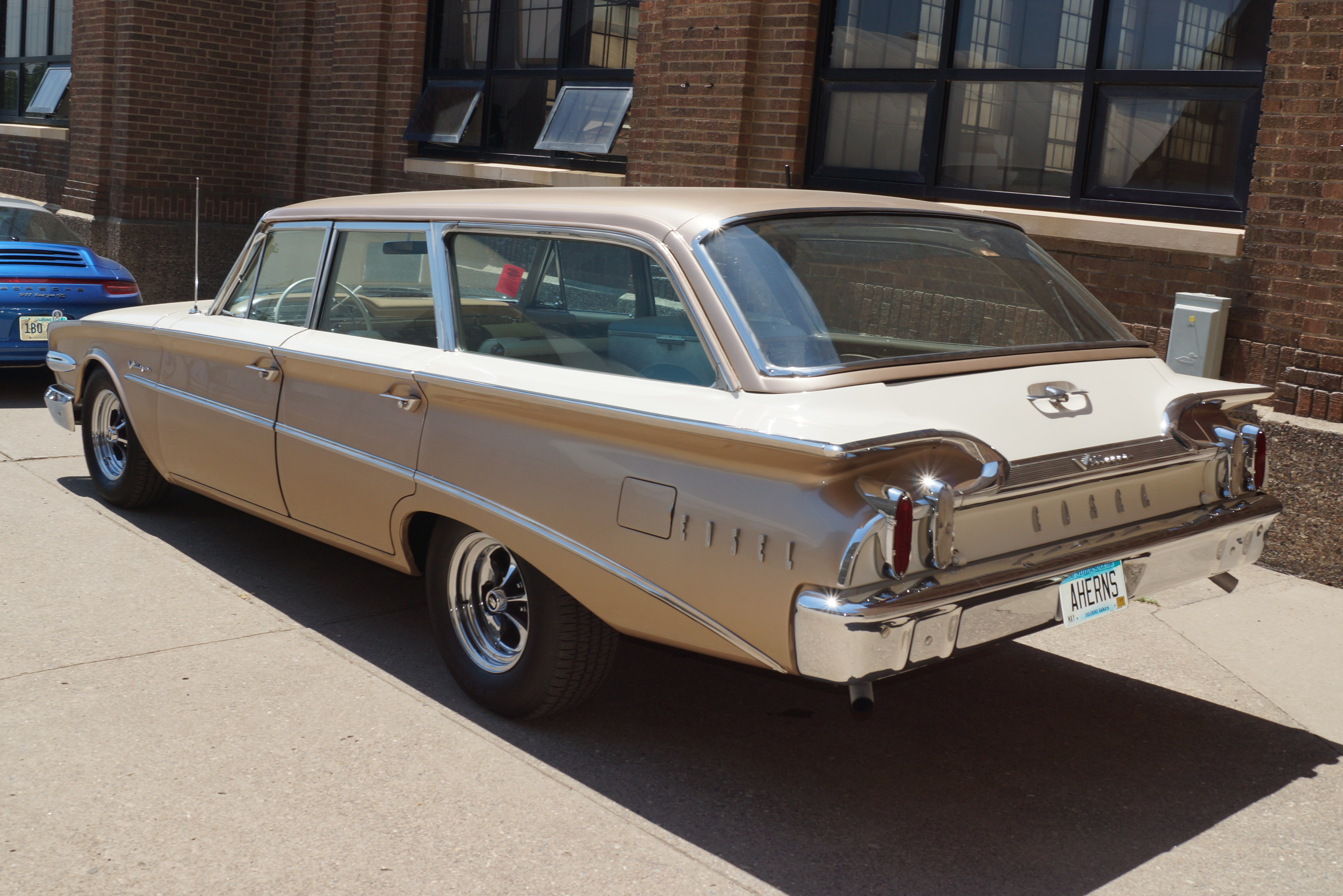
1960 Edsel Villager rear

For 1960, Edsel pared its line solely down to the Ranger passenger cars (five models including a convertible) and Villager station wagon. Though closer in appearance to its Ford Country Sedan counterpart, the Villager saw extensive changes to its body and interior. The horsecollar grille associated with the brand was deleted entirely, replaced by an "hourglass" design, with the brand now distinguished by four vertical oval taillamps (for both the Ranger and Villager). An inch longer than Ford, the Villager now had a 120-inch wheelbase (shared with the Ranger).

The powertrain lineup was all-new for 1960, with the 361 V8 giving way to three engines. A 223 cubic-inch inline-6 was offered as a delete option, with a 292 cubic-inch V8 offered as the standard engine. As an extra-cost option, a 352 cubic-inch V8 was also offered. A 3-speed manual was offered with the inline-6 and the 292 V8; a 2-speed or 3-speed automatic was offered with all three engines.

For 1960, output of the model line dropped significantly, with only 275 units produced. However, the decrease is directly attributable to Edsel being in production for 43 days (from mid-October 1959 to late November 1959). Only 59 nine-passenger Villagers were built for 1960, making them the rarest Edsel station wagon.

== Further use of name ==
Following the discontinuation of the Edsel division, the Villager nameplate would become one of several nameplates from the brand that would see reuse. The Mercury division revived the Villager name in 1962 for a Comet station wagon, using it until 1967. Subsequently, Mercury would use the Villager name to denote multiple woodgrained station wagons (similar to Ford Squire wagons), including top-trim wagons from the Montego, Bobcat, Cougar, Zephyr, and Lynx model lines. As the flagship Colony Park wagon was always sold with a woodgrain exterior, it never was marketed with a Villager trim.

During the early 1990s, the Mercury Villager became a stand-alone model line, though losing its woodgrain trim. Developed as part of Ford-Nissan joint venture, the Villager was a direct counterpart of the Nissan Quest.

== Production numbers ==
Production Figures for Edsel Villager
Body Style	1958	1959	1960
6-Passenger Station Wagon	2,294	5,687	216
9-Passenger Station Wagon	978	2,133	59
Total	3,272	7,820	275
