= Edsel Pacer =

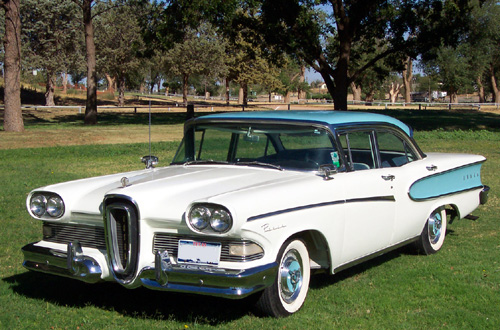
- Pacer 4-door sedan

Overview
- Manufacturer: Edsel (Ford)
- Model years: 1958
- Assembly: Mahwah, New Jersey; Louisville, Kentucky; San Jose, California; Oakville, Ontario
- Designer: Roy Brown Jr.

Body and chassis
- Class: Full-size
- Body style: 2-door convertible 2-door hardtop 4-door hardtop 4-door sedan
- Related: Edsel Ranger; Edsel Bermuda; Edsel Villager; Edsel Roundup; Ford Fairlane; Ford Custom; Ford Country Squire

Powertrain
- Engine: 361 cu in (5.9 L) FE V8
- Transmission: 3-speed manual 3-speed automatic

Dimensions
- Wheelbase: 118.0 in (2,997 mm)
- Length: 213.2 in (5,415 mm)
- Width: 78.8 in (2,002 mm)
- Curb weight: 4,000–4,500 lb (1,814–2,041 kg)

Chronology
- Predecessor: Ford Fairlane
- Successor: Ford Galaxie

The Edsel Pacer is an automobile that was produced and sold by Edsel in 1958. The Pacer was based on the shorter narrower Edsel platform, shared with Ford and the Ranger.

Pacer is one of two Edsel model names reused by manufacturers other than Ford, as was Citation. The Corsair, used a name previously applied to the Henry J by the Kaiser-Frazer Corporation.

The Pacer represented a step up from the basic Ranger model. In addition to the Ranger's base trim appoints, the Pacer received contoured seat backs, nylon upholstery cloth, color-keyed rubber floor mats, and extra stainless steel exterior and interior trim pieces and window moldings. A basic heater (as a US$92 option) and radio (at $95) were available, and air conditioning was optional, as well (at $417). A tachometer was optional.

All Pacers rode on Ford's 118 in (2997 mm) wheelbase and shared the Ranger’s engine choices, with a 303 hp (226 kW) 361 cu in (5.9 L) FE V8 (with four-barrel carburetor) as standard. (The 345 hp (257 kW) 410 cu in (6.7 L) MEL V8, standard in the Corsair and Citation, was not available.) A three-speed manual transmission was also standard. Buyers also could upgrade to a three-speed automatic transmission with a standard column-mounted gear selector, or choose Edsel’s highly promoted but trouble-prone Teletouch automatic, which placed its drive-selection buttons in the steering wheel hub, as a US$231 option.

While their roll-out was highly publicized in the fall of 1957, Edsels were a marketing disaster for Ford and for Ford's corporate strategy for meeting General Motors product line for product line. Total Pacer output in U.S. and Canada for the model stood at 20,988 units, of which 1,876 were U.S.-built convertibles, 7,141 four-door sedans (6,083 U.S./1,058 Canada), 6,717 hardtop coupes (6,139 U.S./578 Canada), and 5,254 four-door hardtops (4,959 U.S./295 Canada). Prices for the Pacer ranged from $2,700 to $2,993. Despite being among the best-selling 1958 Edsel models, the Pacer was discontinued at the end of the 1958 model year. The premium Citation model was also dropped, as was the trouble-prone Teletouch system.

== Production figures ==
Production Figures for Edsel Pacer
Body Style	Units
2-Door Convertible	1,876
2-Door Hardtop	6,717
4-Door Hardtop	5,254
4-Door Sedan	7,141
Total	20,988

== Gallery ==
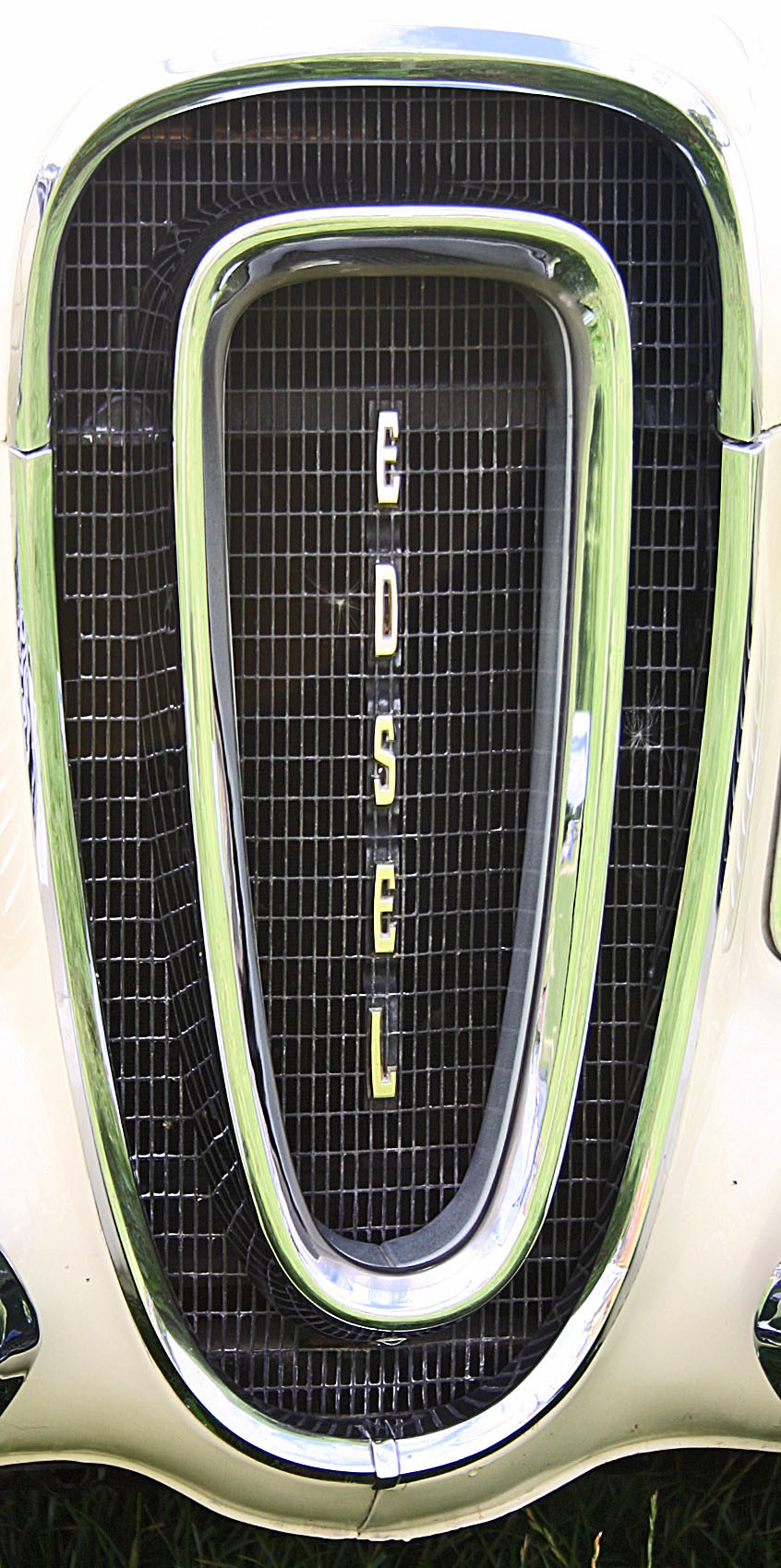
1958 "horse collar" grille

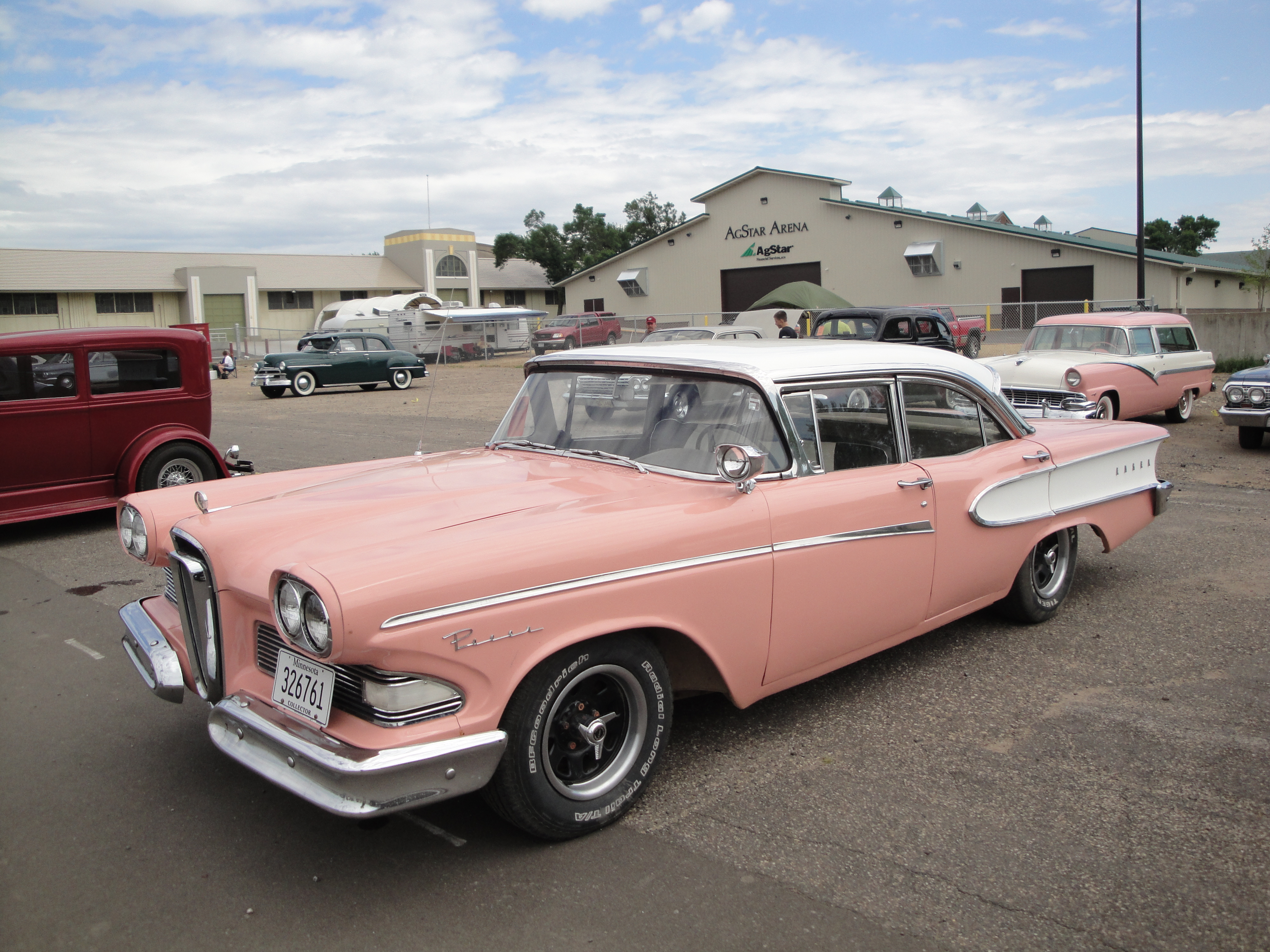
1958 Edsel Pacer 4-door sedan

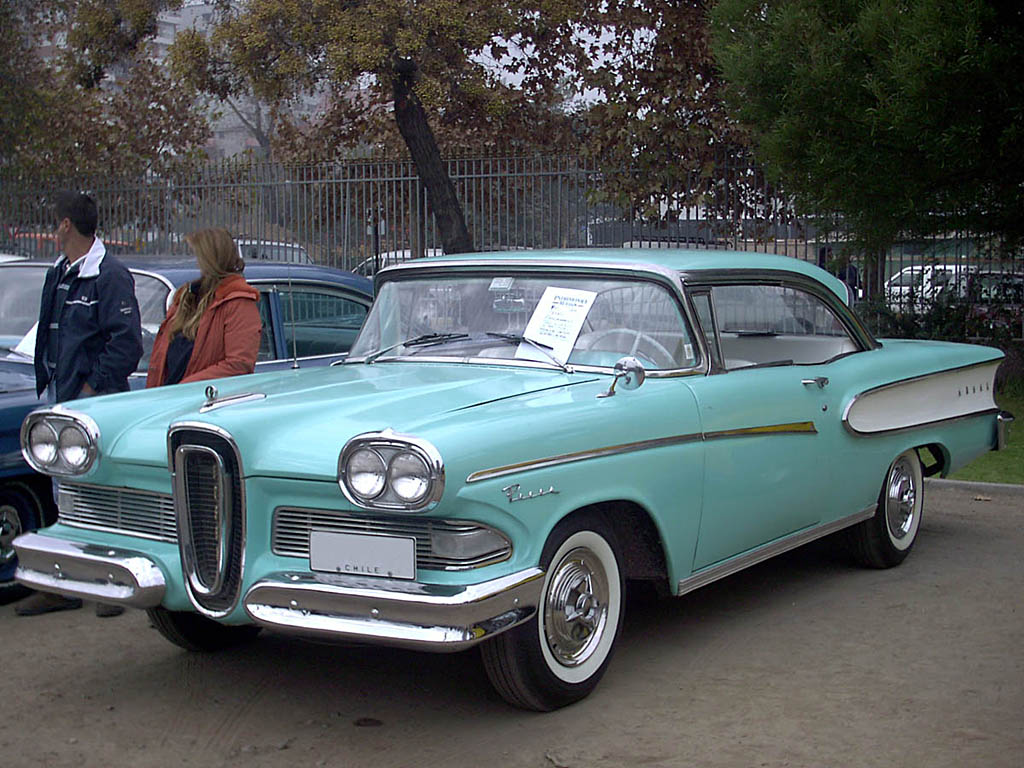
1958 Edsel Pacer 2-door Hardtop

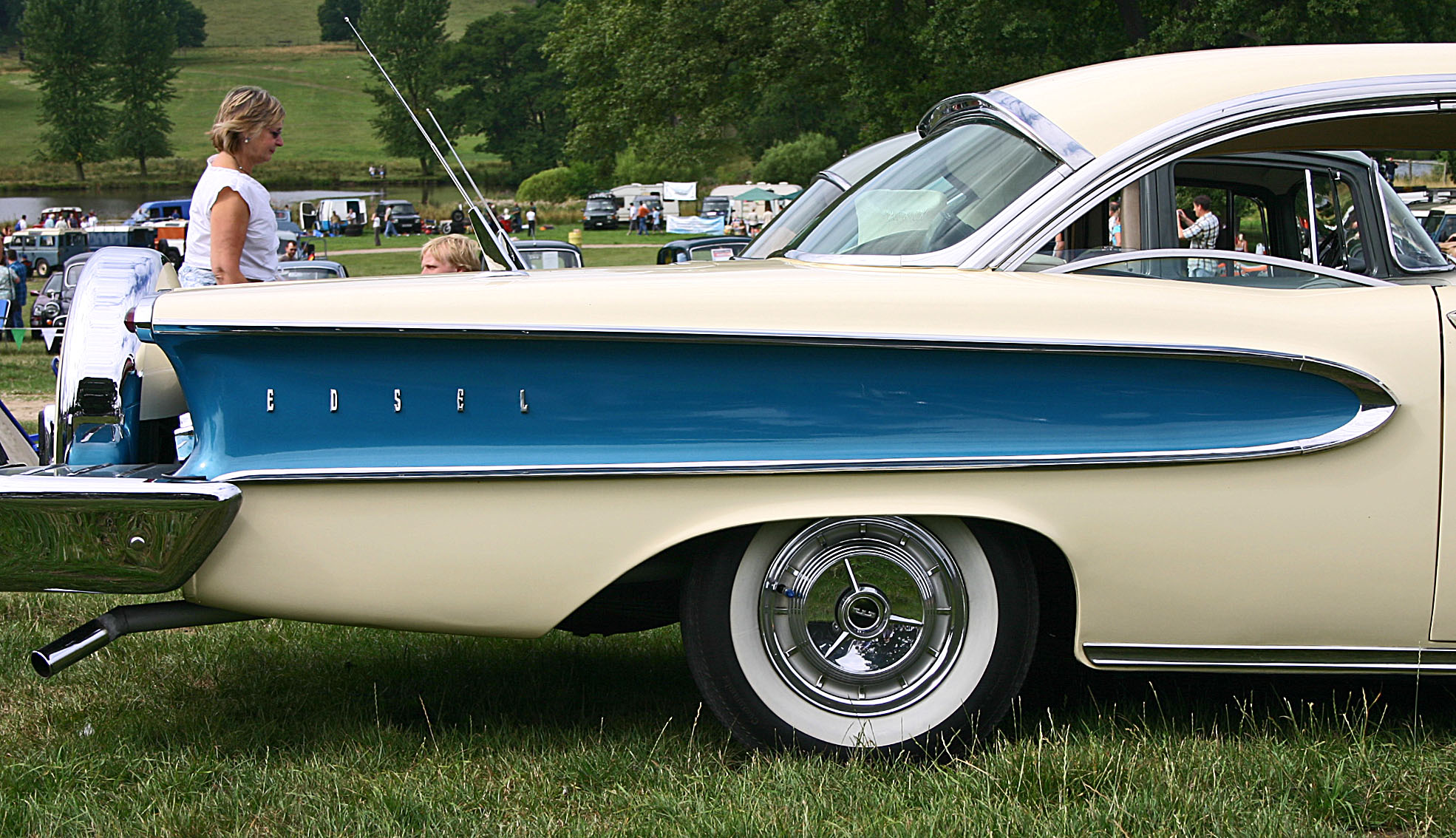
1958 Edsel Pacer rear quarter

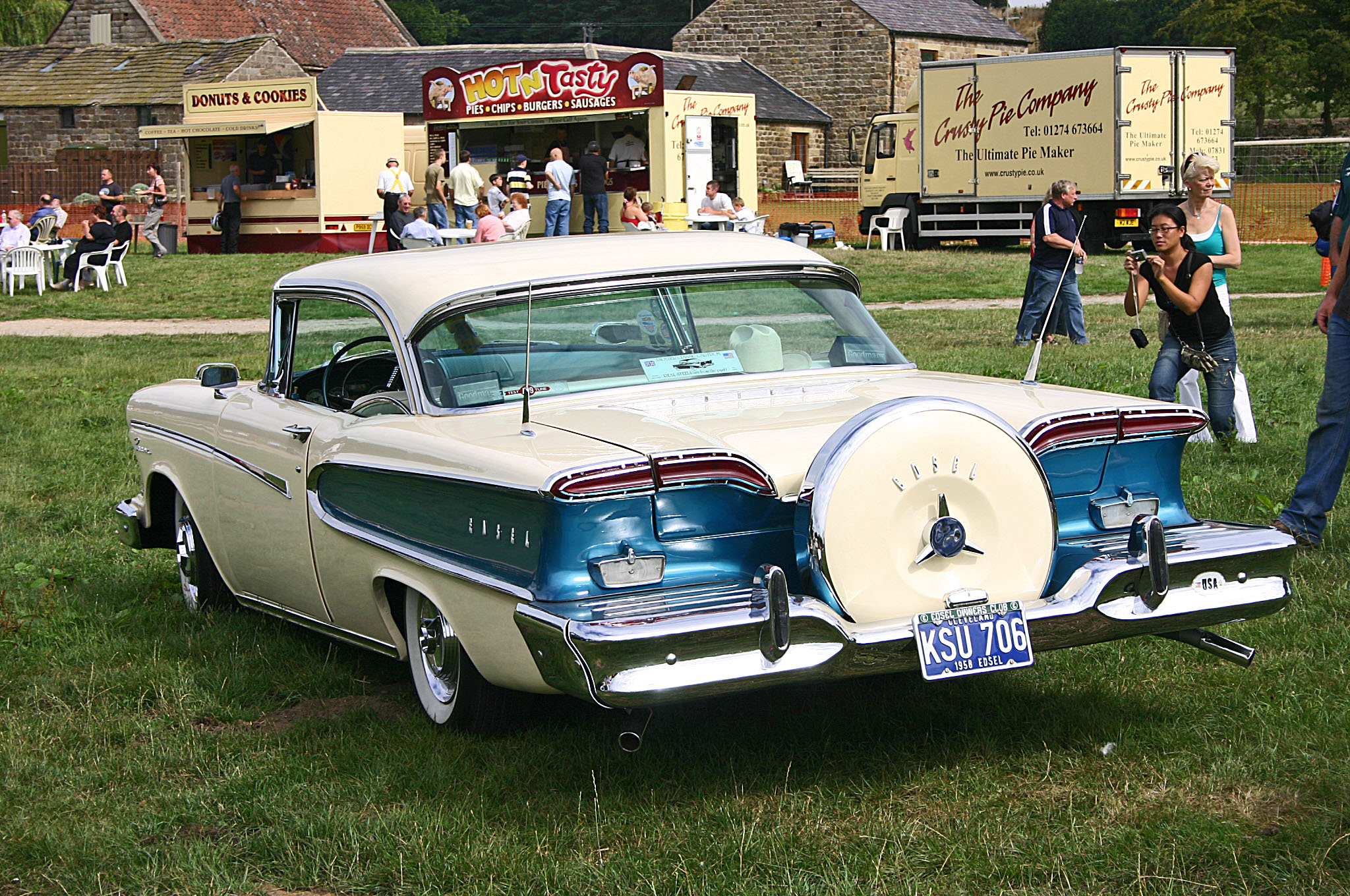
1958 Edsel Pacer rear

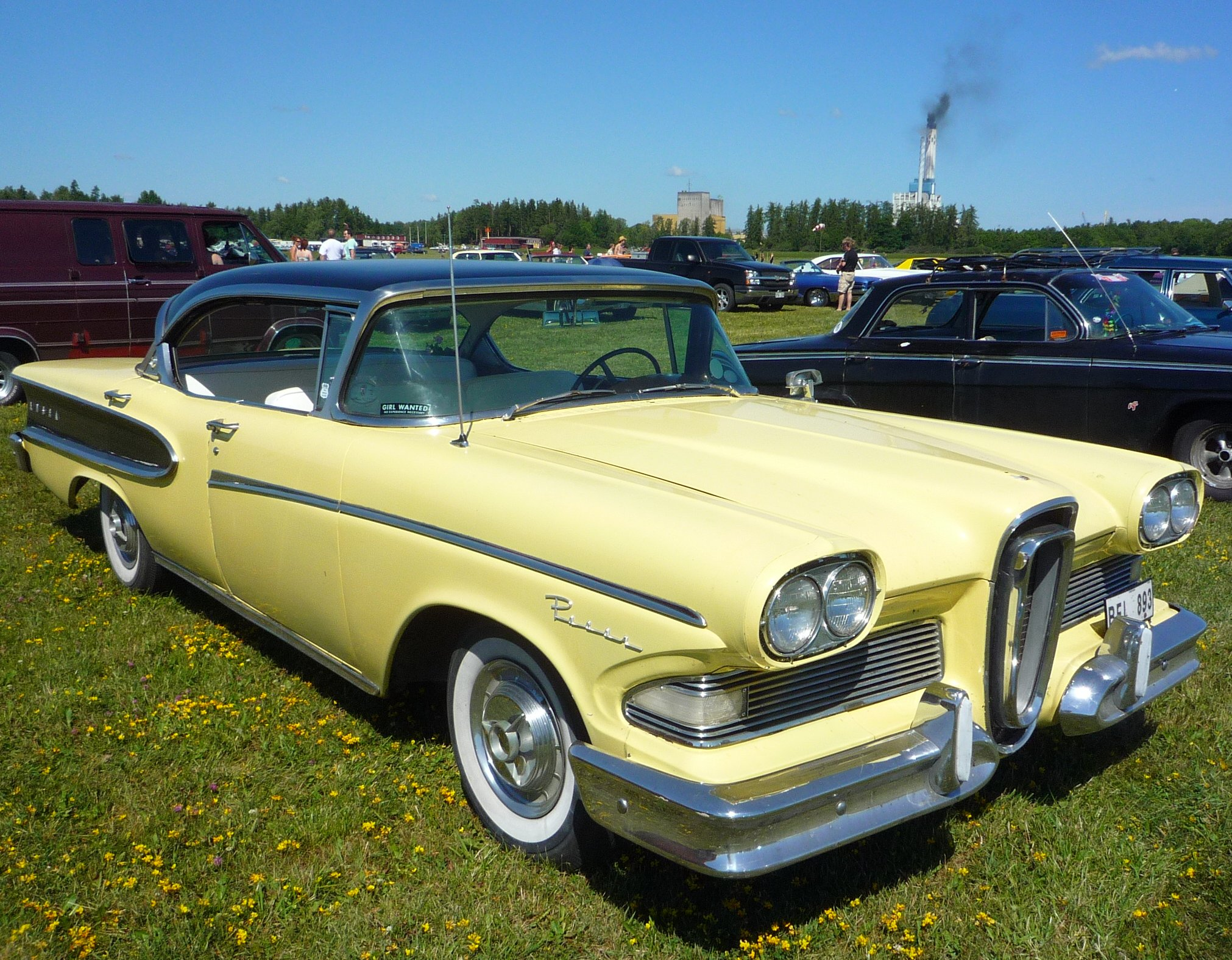
Edsel Pacer 4-door Hardtop

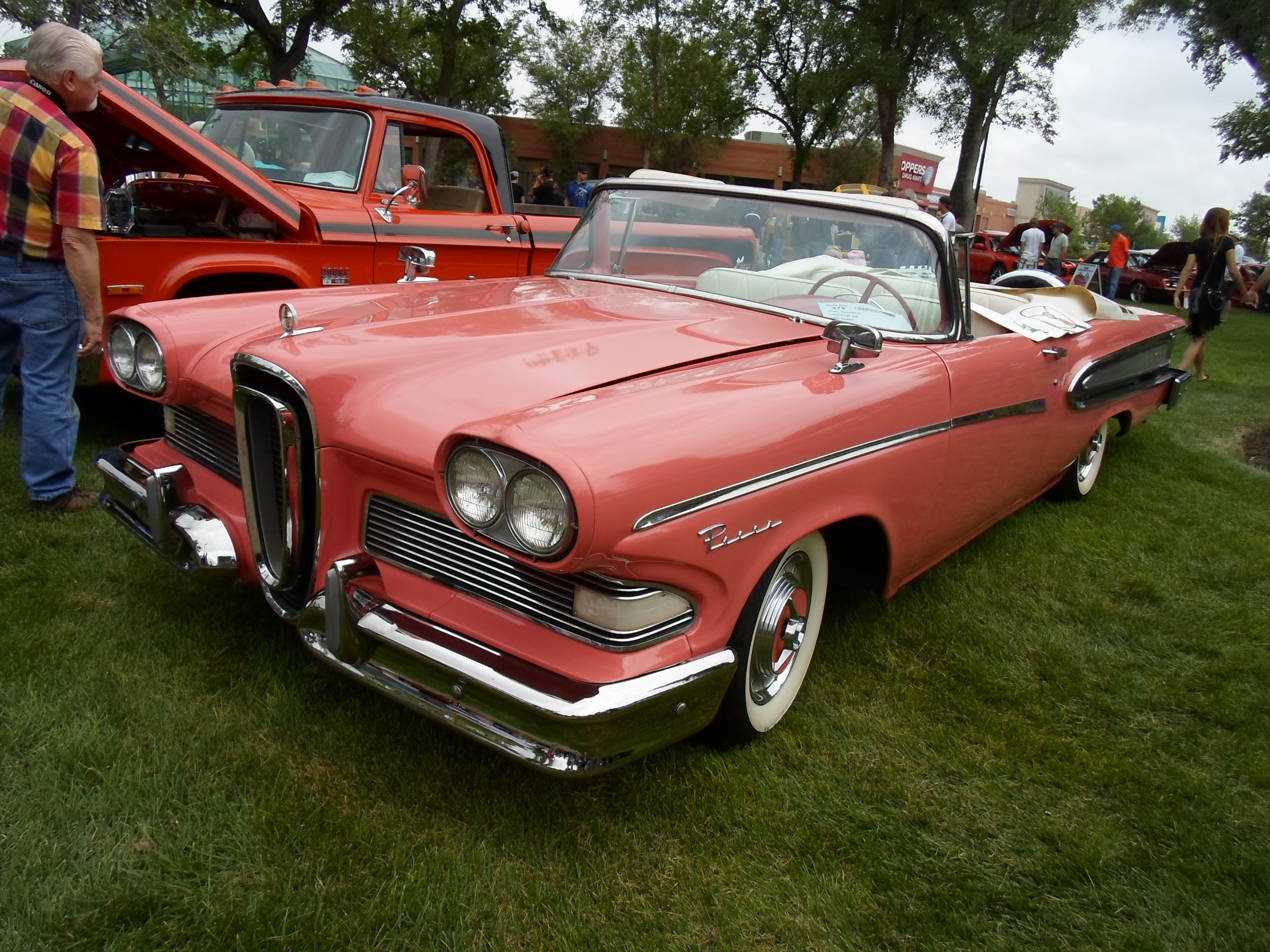
Edsel Pacer Convertible

== Different platforms ==
The model year of Edsel's introduction was a post-WW II high point of sorts for the Ford Motor Company. Three full-size platforms of distinctly different interior widths were in use each by Lincoln, Mercury, and Ford, a situation that lasted until Ford received a much wider platform in 1960. Edsel shared both Mercury's and Ford's platform in 1958, so offers an insight into their differing interior dimensions.

1958 Comparison	Edsel Citation/Corsair	Edsel Pacer/Ranger
Wheelbase	124.0 in (3,150 mm)	118.0 in (2,997 mm)
Overall length	218.9 in (5,560 mm)	213.2 in (5,415 mm)
Width	79.8 in (2,027 mm)	78.8 in (2,002 mm)
Height	56.8 in (1,443 mm)	56.2 in (1,427 mm)
Front head room	33.9 in (861 mm)	33.2 in (843 mm)
Front leg room	44.2 in (1,123 mm)	43.1 in (1,095 mm)
Front hip room	63.5 in (1,613 mm)	60.0 in (1,524 mm)
Front shoulder room	59.7 in (1,516 mm)	57.3 in (1,455 mm)
Rear head room	32.8 in (833 mm)	33.6 in (853 mm)
Rear leg room–ins.	43.4 in (1,102 mm)	40.7 in (1,034 mm)
Rear hip room	63.5 in (1,613 mm)	60.1 in (1,527 mm)
Rear shoulder room	59.7 in (1,516 mm)	57.0 in (1,448 mm)
