= Edsel Ranger =

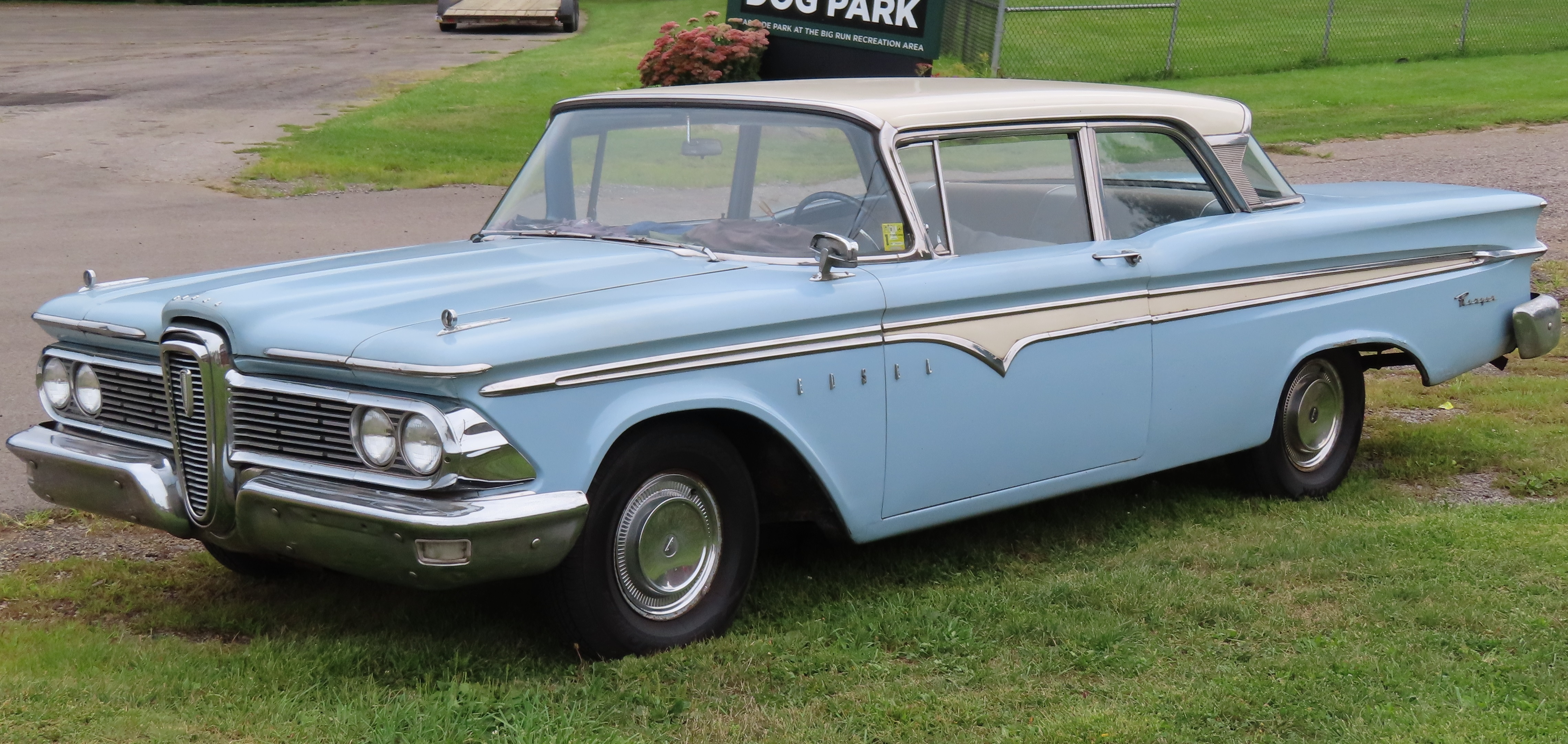
- 1959 Edsel Ranger two-door sedan

Overview
- Manufacturer: Edsel (Ford)
- Production: 1957–1960
- Model years: 1958–1960
- Assembly: Mahwah, New Jersey; Louisville, Kentucky; San Jose, California; Oakville, Ontario, Canada
- Designer: Roy Brown Jr.

Body and chassis
- Class: Full-size
- Layout: FR layout

The Edsel Ranger is an automobile that was produced and sold by the newly formed Edsel Division of Ford for the 1958–1960 model years. It was built on the shorter, narrower Edsel platform, shared with Ford and Edsel Pacer models.

The Ranger was the base trim model for Edsel in its first and second years as an automotive marque. It was available in two-door coupes, four-door sedans, and two- and four-door hardtops with a convertible also offered in 1960.

Ranger is one of three of Edsel's model nameplates reused by Ford Motor Company products, Villager and Corsair being the others.

== 1958–1959 ==
First generation
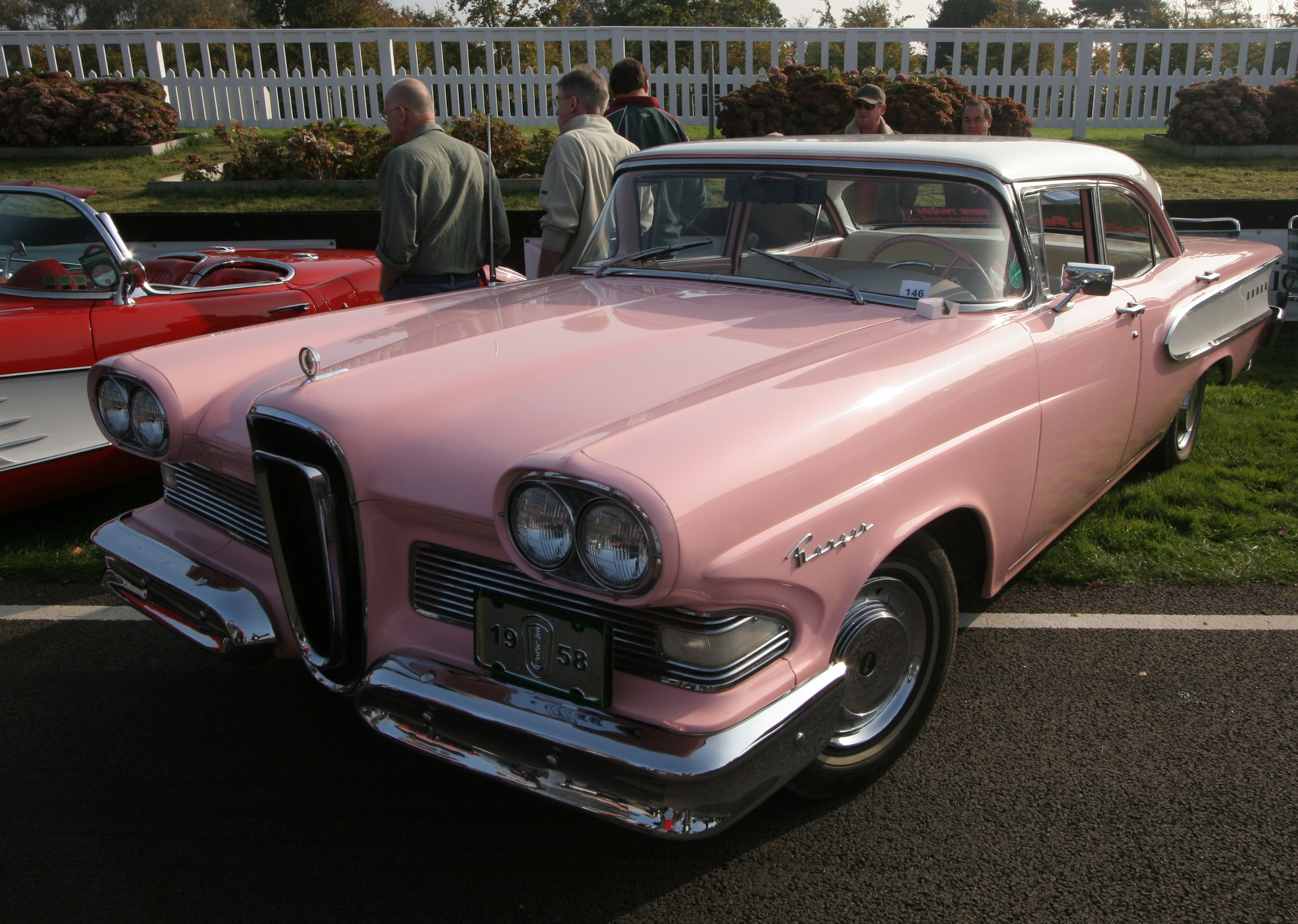
- 1958 Edsel Ranger four-door sedan

Overview
- Model years: 1958–1959

Body and chassis
- Body style: 2-door sedan 2-door hardtop 4-door hardtop 4-door sedan
- Related: Edsel Pacer; Edsel Bermuda; Edsel Villager; Edsel Roundup; Ford Galaxie; Ford Fairlane; Ford Country Sedan; Ford Country Squire

Powertrain
- Engine: 1958: 361 cu in (5.9 L) FE V8; 1959: 223 cu in (3.7 L) Mileage Maker I6; 1959: 292 cu in (4.8 L) Ford Y-block V8
- Transmission: 3-speed manual 3-speed automatic

Dimensions
- Wheelbase: 1958: 118.0 in (2,997 mm); 1959: 120.0 in (3,048 mm)
- Length: 213.2 in (5,415 mm) (car), 205.5 in (5,220 mm) (wagon)
- Width: 1958: 78.8 in (2,002 mm); 1959: 79.8 in (2,027 mm)
- Curb weight: 3,700–4,000 lb (1,678–1,814 kg)

The Ranger's base trim appointments included arm rests, a cigarette lighter, rear-view mirror, two coat hangers, and black rubber floor mats. On the exterior, Rangers received chrome around the rear quarter-panel cove molding. Two-tone paint was also optional. The main visual cue that makes differentiating most Rangers and the upmarket Pacer possible was the lack of stainless trim on the front doors and fenders. A very rare, optional, Ranger-only door trim was available from dealers early in the model year to be used together with the Pacer fender trim. A basic heater (as a $92 option) and radio (at $95) were available, and air conditioning was optional, as well (at $417), along with seat belts, warning lights, automatic trunk opener, and rear-door child-safety lock covers.

The Ranger rode on Ford's 118-inch (2997-mm) wheelbase (except the wagons, which used a 116-inch (2946-mm) wheelbase) and a 303 hp (226 kW) 361 cu in (5.9 L) FE V8 with a four-barrel carburetor was standard, as was a three-speed manual transmission. Buyers could upgrade to a three-speed automatic transmission with a standard column-mounted gear selector, or could choose Edsel's highly promoted, but trouble-prone Teletouch automatic, which placed its drive-selection buttons in the steering wheel hub, as a $231 option. The 345 hp (257 kW) 410 cu in (6.7 L) MEL V8, standard in the Corsair and Citation, was not available.

While their roll-out was highly publicized in the fall of 1957, Edsels were a marketing disaster for Ford and for Ford's corporate strategy for meeting General Motors' product line for product line. Total U.S. and Canada Ranger output for the model stood at an estimated 21,301 units. Of those units, 4,615 were U.S.-built two-door sedans, 7,414 were four-door sedans (6,576 U.S./838 Canada), 6,005 were two-door hardtops (5,546 U.S./459 Canada), and 3,667 were four-door hardtops (3,077 U.S./190 Canada). Prices ranged from $2,529 to $2,990.

In regrouping for the coming model year, the best-selling Pacer and the premium Citation models were dropped for 1959, as was the trouble prone Teletouch transmission feature, which was replaced with the column-selector Mile-O-Matic (the Edsel division's branding for the two-speed Fordomatic).

For 1959, the Ranger and the new top-line Corsair both shared the same 120-in wheelbase. The frame was ladder-type. Styling for the cars became more conservative, with the horsecollar grille being replaced by a shield shape filled with rows of bars. Body styles for the Ranger remained at two-door sedans and four-door sedans, and two and four-door hardtop bodies; 7,778 two-door sedans (all U.S.-built), 14,063 four-door sedans (12,814 U.S./1,249 Canada), 5,966 hardtops (5,474 U.S./492 Canada), and 2,451 four-door hardtops (2,352 U.S./99 Canada) were produced for 1959 in the U.S. and Canada. Prices ranged from $2,629 to $2,756.

Production Figures
| Body Style | 1958 | 1959 |
|---|---|---|
| 2-Door Hardtop | 6,005 | 5,966 |
| 2-Door Sedan | 4,615 | 7,778 |
| 4-Door Hardtop | 3,667 | 2,451 |
| 4-Door Sedan | 7,414 | 14,063 |
| Total | 21,701 | 30,258 |

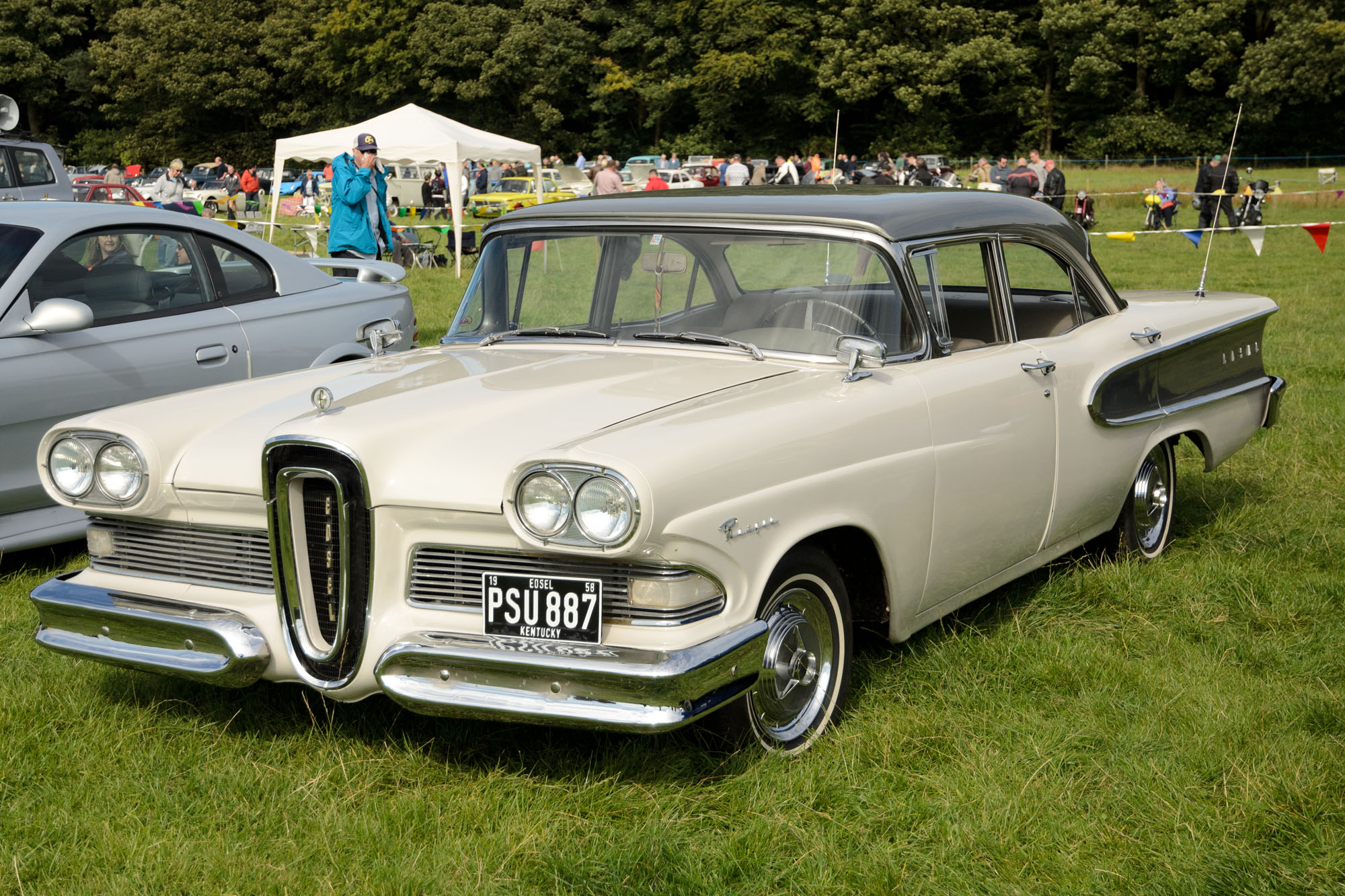
1958 Edsel Ranger 4-Door Sedan

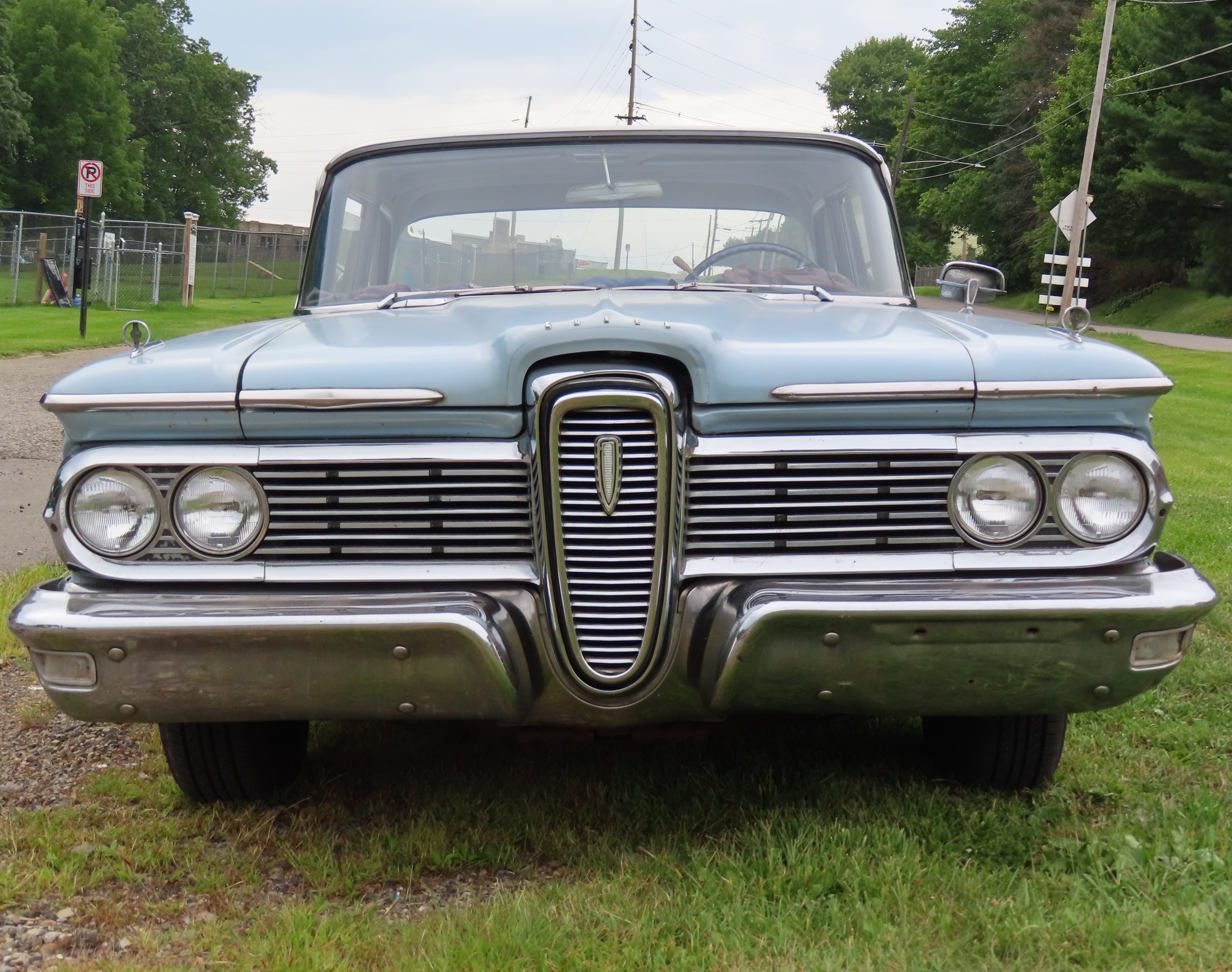
1959 'horsecollar' grille

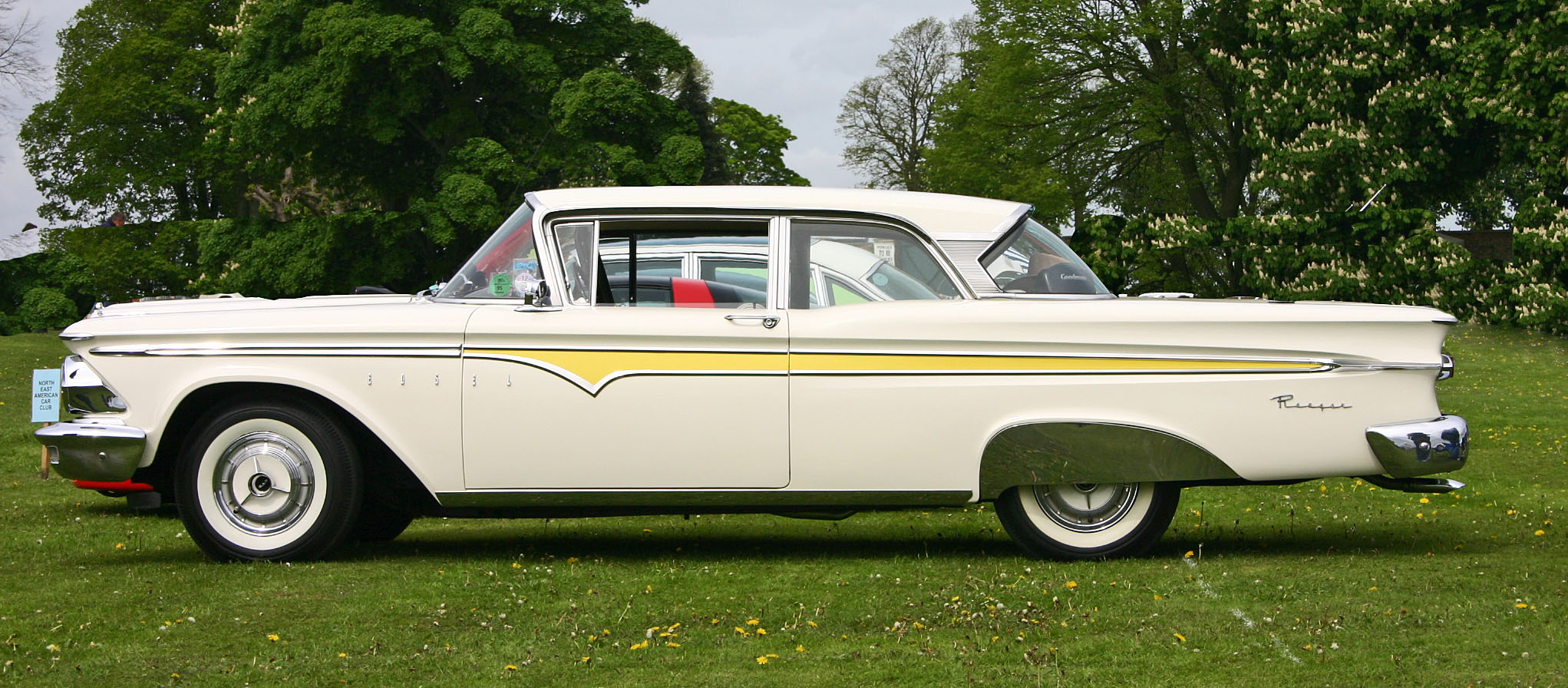
1959 Edsel Ranger 2-Door profile.

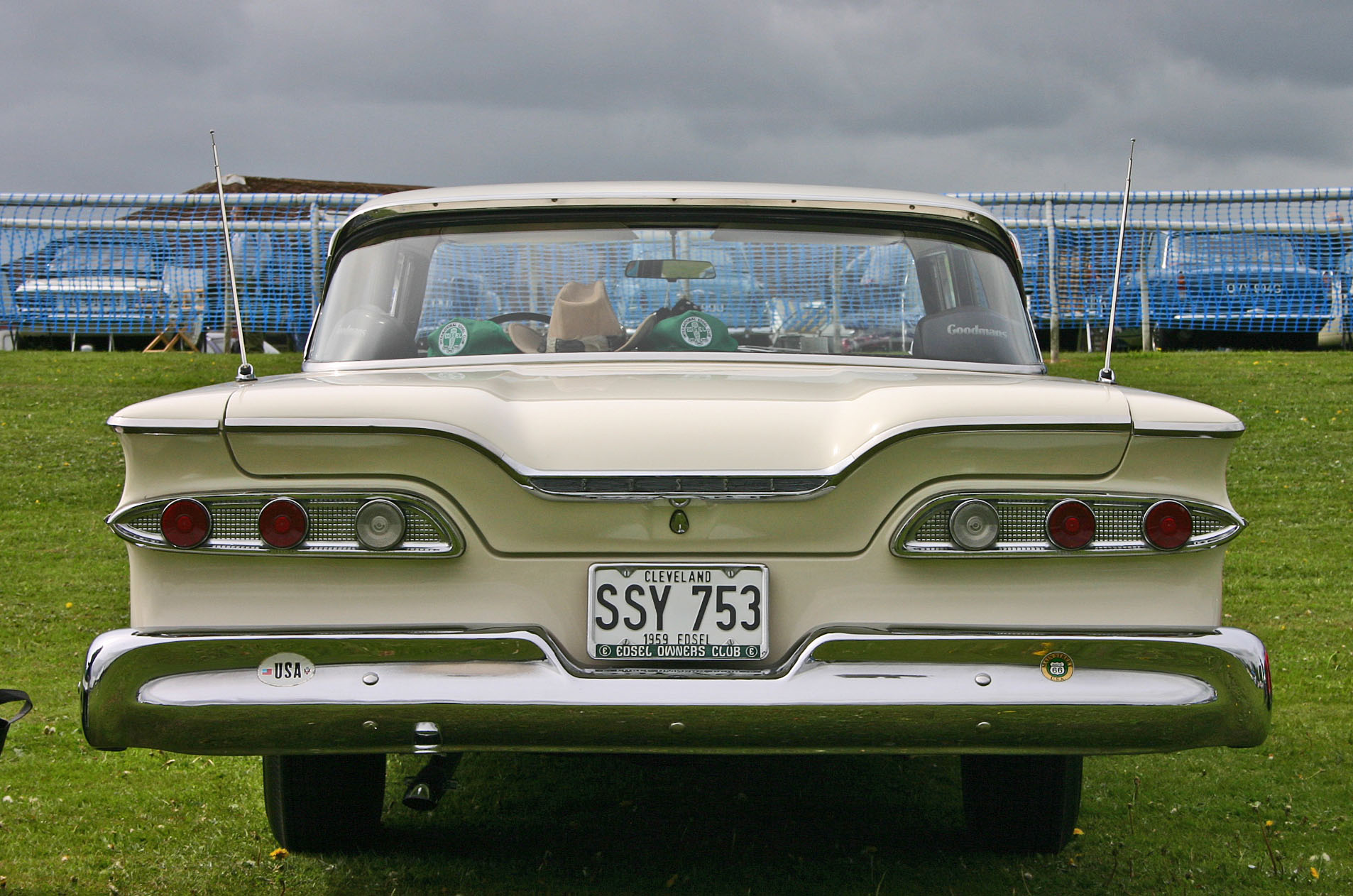
1959 Edsel Ranger 2-Door rear.

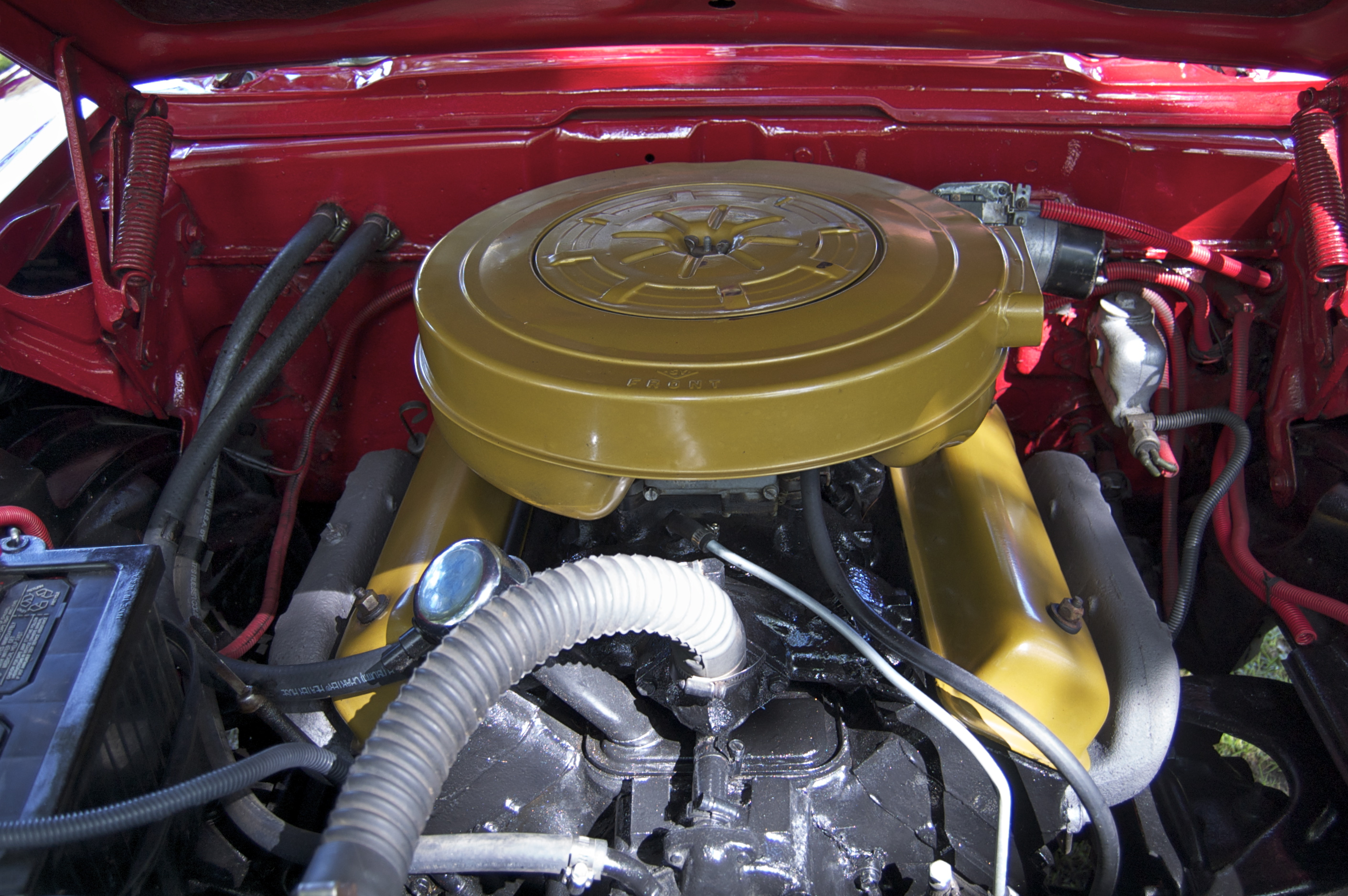
1959 Edsel Ranger engine bay.

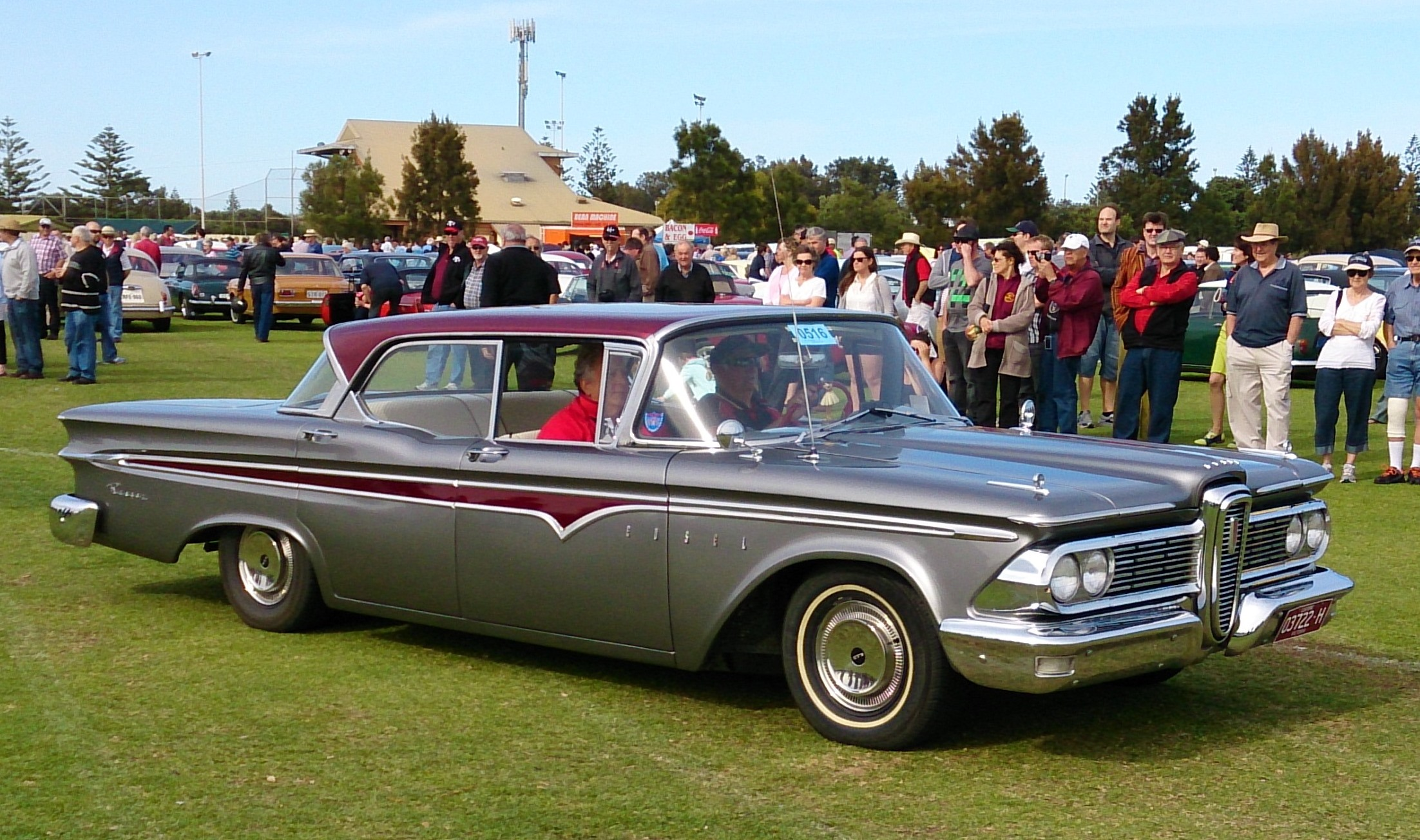
1959 Edsel Ranger 4-Door Hardtop.

== Different platforms ==
The model year of Edsel's introduction was a post-WWII high point of sorts for the Ford Motor Company. Three full-sized platforms of distinctly different interior widths were in use each by Lincoln, Mercury, and Ford, a situation that lasted until Ford received a much wider platform in 1960. Edsel shared both Mercury's and Ford's platform in 1958, so offers an insight into their differing interior dimensions.

| 1958 Comparison | Edsel Citation/Corsair | Edsel Pacer/Ranger |
|---|---|---|
| Wheelbase | 124.0 in (3,150 mm) | 118.0 in (2,997 mm) |
| Overall length | 218.9 in (5,560 mm) | 213.2 in (5,415 mm) |
| Width | 79.8 in (2,027 mm) | 78.8 in (2,002 mm) |
| Height | 56.8 in (1,443 mm) | 56.2 in (1,427 mm) |
| Front head room | 33.9 in (861 mm) | 33.2 in (843 mm) |
| Front leg room | 44.2 in (1,123 mm) | 43.1 in (1,095 mm) |
| Front hip room | 63.5 in (1,613 mm) | 60.0 in (1,524 mm) |
| Front shoulder room | 59.7 in (1,516 mm) | 57.3 in (1,455 mm) |
| Rear headbroom | 32.8 in (833 mm) | 33.6 in (853 mm) |
| Rear leg room | 43.4 in (1,102 mm) | 40.7 in (1,034 mm) |
| Rear hip room | 63.5 in (1,613 mm) | 60.1 in (1,527 mm) |
| Rear shoulder room | 59.7 in (1,516 mm) | 57.0 in (1,448 mm) |

== 1960 ==
Second generation
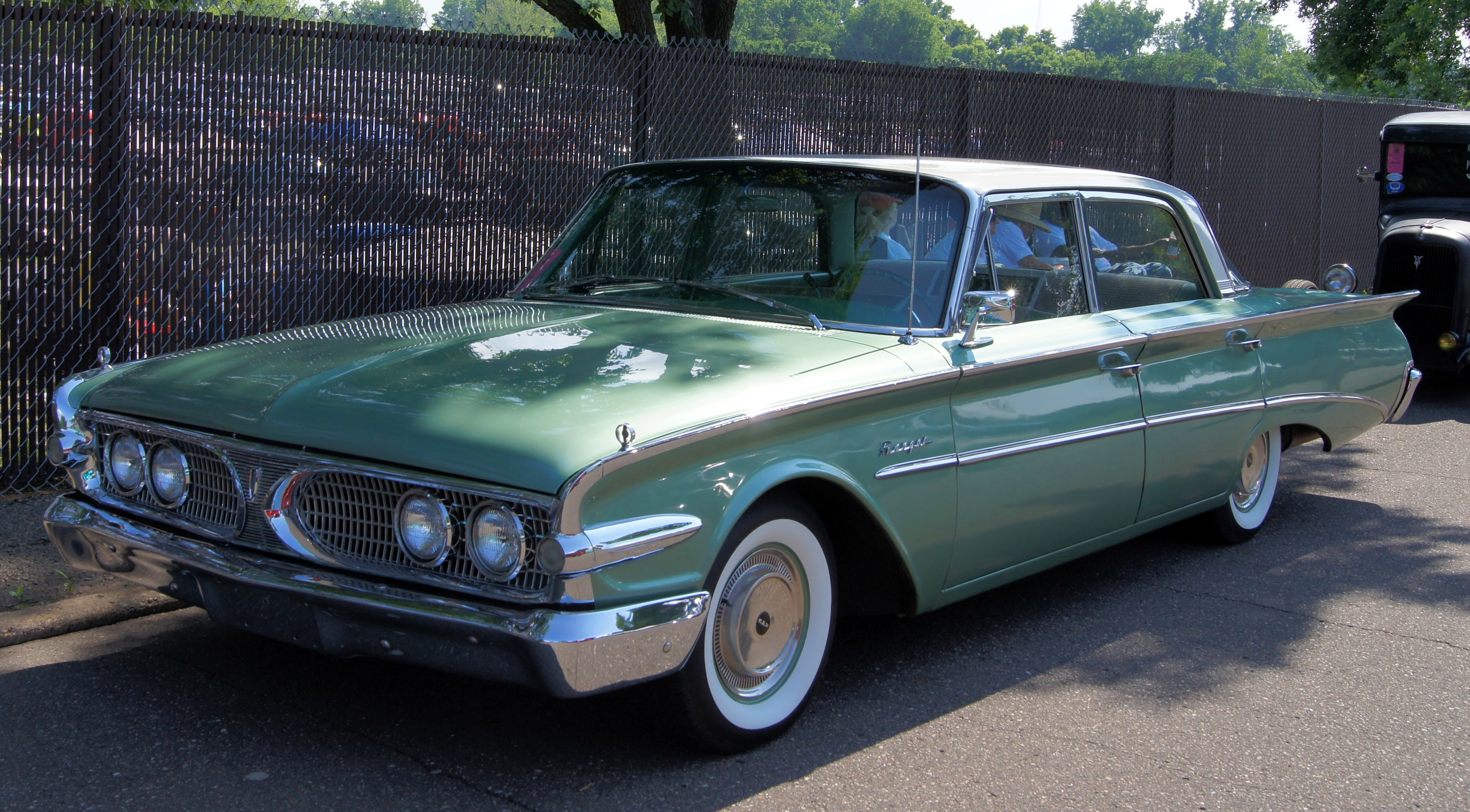
- 1960 Edsel Ranger four-door sedan

Overview
- Model years: 1960
- Assembly: Louisville, Kentucky; Allen Park, Michigan

Body and chassis
- Body style: 2-door sedan 2-door convertible 2-door hardtop 4-door hardtop 4-door sedan
- Related: Edsel Villager; Ford Galaxie; Ford Fairlane; Ford Country Sedan

Powertrain
- Engine: 223 cu in (3.7 L) Mileage Maker I6; 292 cu in (4.8 L) Ford Y-block V8; 361 cu in (5.9 L) FE V8
- Transmission: 3-speed manual 3-speed automatic

Dimensions
- Wheelbase: 120.0 in (3,048 mm)
- Width: 79.8 in (2,027 mm)
- Curb weight: 3,800–4,000 lb (1,724–1,814 kg)

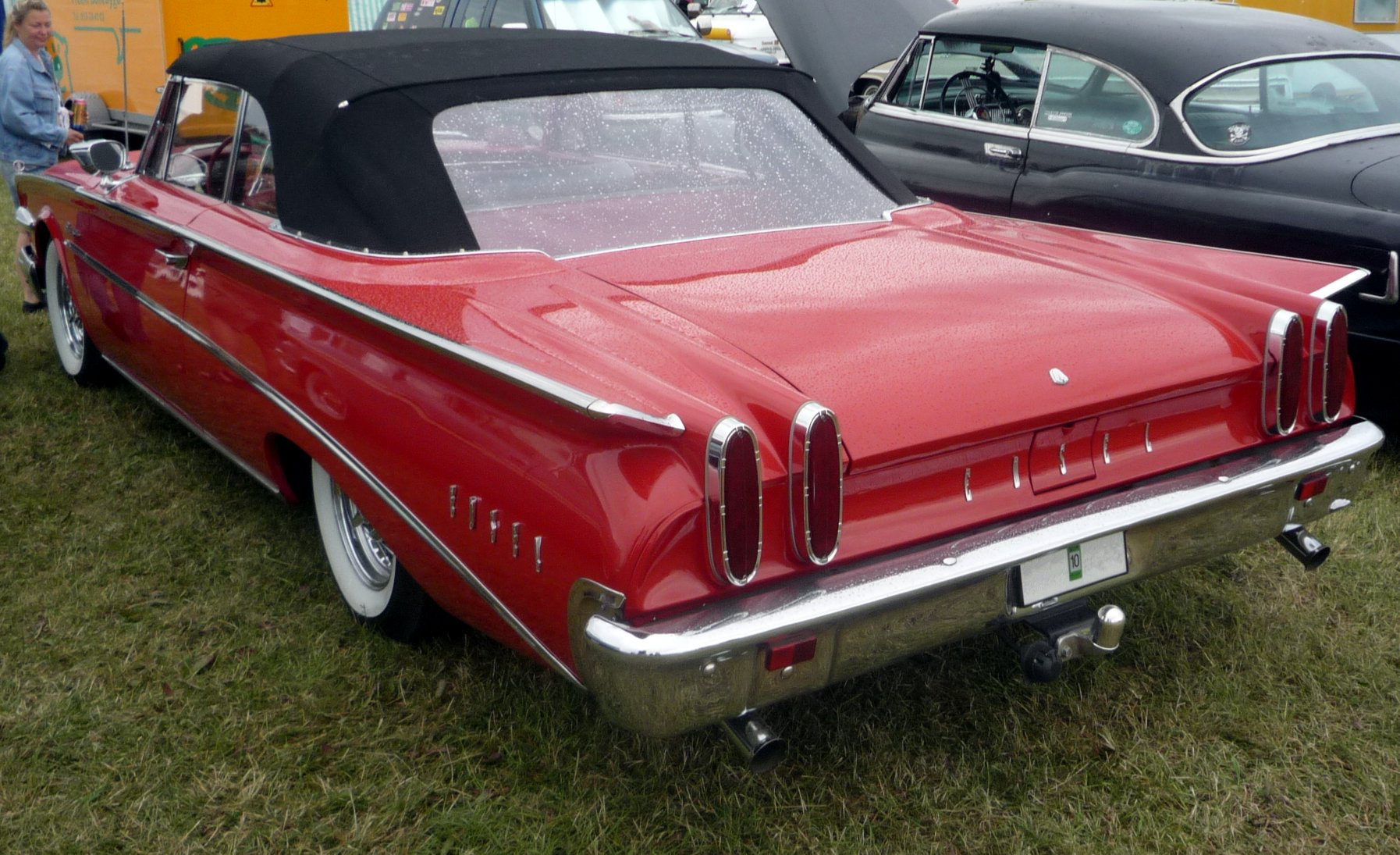
1960 Edsel Ranger Convertible rear

Introduced on October 15, 1959, the 1960 Ranger was now the only sedan Edsel offered, while the Villager name applied to two station wagons, six- and a nine-passenger models. The decision was made to eliminate not only the Corsair, but the vertical grille element, as well. The new grille had an "hourglass" appearance. By this point, the 1960 model shared so many body panels and interior trim features with Ford, that the defining characteristics that distinguished Edsels from Fords were its taillights, grille, signal/parking lights, trim at the front of the sides of the fenders, and of course, name badges. It came with a ladder-type frame and a 120-in wheelbase.

On November 19, 1959, Ford discontinued the Edsel marque and the final car rolled off the assembly line by the end of the month, so the 1960 model never reached its own calendar year. The cars were effectively orphaned, since Ford stopped making parts for Edsels at that point. For its shortened and final model year, 2,571 Rangers and 275 Villager units were produced (all in the U.S.), with the rarest models being the convertible (76) and the four-door, 9-passenger Villager wagon (59, the rarest). The Villager is mentioned here so as to highlight the fact that the Ranger convertible was the second rarest of all Edsels produced. Original prices ranged from $2,643 to $3,000.

1960 Edsel Facts:

-Chief Stylist: Bud Kaufman -All 1960 Edsels were produced in the Louisville, KY manufacturing plant. (Although a few cars from the Allen Park, MI pilot plant are still in existence) -1960 Edsels introduced such innovations as horizontal coolant flow through the radiator to improve cooling, and placement of the muffler away from the passenger compartment to reduce heat. -Production of 1960 Edsels began on September 14, 1959 -Introduction of the 1960 line was made on October 15, 1959 -The last official day of Edsel assembly was November 19, 1959 -Total Production for all 1960 Ranger models: 2,571 (2,846 including Villager wagons)

With such a limited production run-time, the 1960 model included some of the rarest Edsel models of any of the three model years.

Production Figures
| Body Style | Units |
|---|---|
| 2-Door Convertible | 76 |
| 2-Door Hardtop | 295 |
| 2-Door Sedan | 777 |
| 4-Door Hardtop | 135 |
| 4-Door Sedan | 1,288 |
| Total | 2,571 |

== Counterfeit convertibles ==
Because of the low production volumes in its three years, all Rangers are collectible; however, the 1960 Ranger convertible is frequently found as being counterfeit.

The process for converting a 1960 Ford Sunliner convertible into a 1960 Edsel model involves the simple swapping of trim parts and refashioning of the rear fenders, a simple task for those who have an Edsel parts car. Edsel enthusiasts are generally wary of 1960 Edsels that have been "found" or are offered at lower prices than the going rates. Buyers and enthusiasts can check the manufacturers code to verify if the VIN matches Edsel production numbers for November 1959. Another way of checking is to measure the wheelbase; a genuine Edsel rides on a 120 in (3,048 mm) wheelbase, while a converted Ford Sunliner has a 119 in (3,023 mm) wheelbase.
