= San Jose Assembly Plant =

Former Ford manufacturing site in California

San Jose Assembly
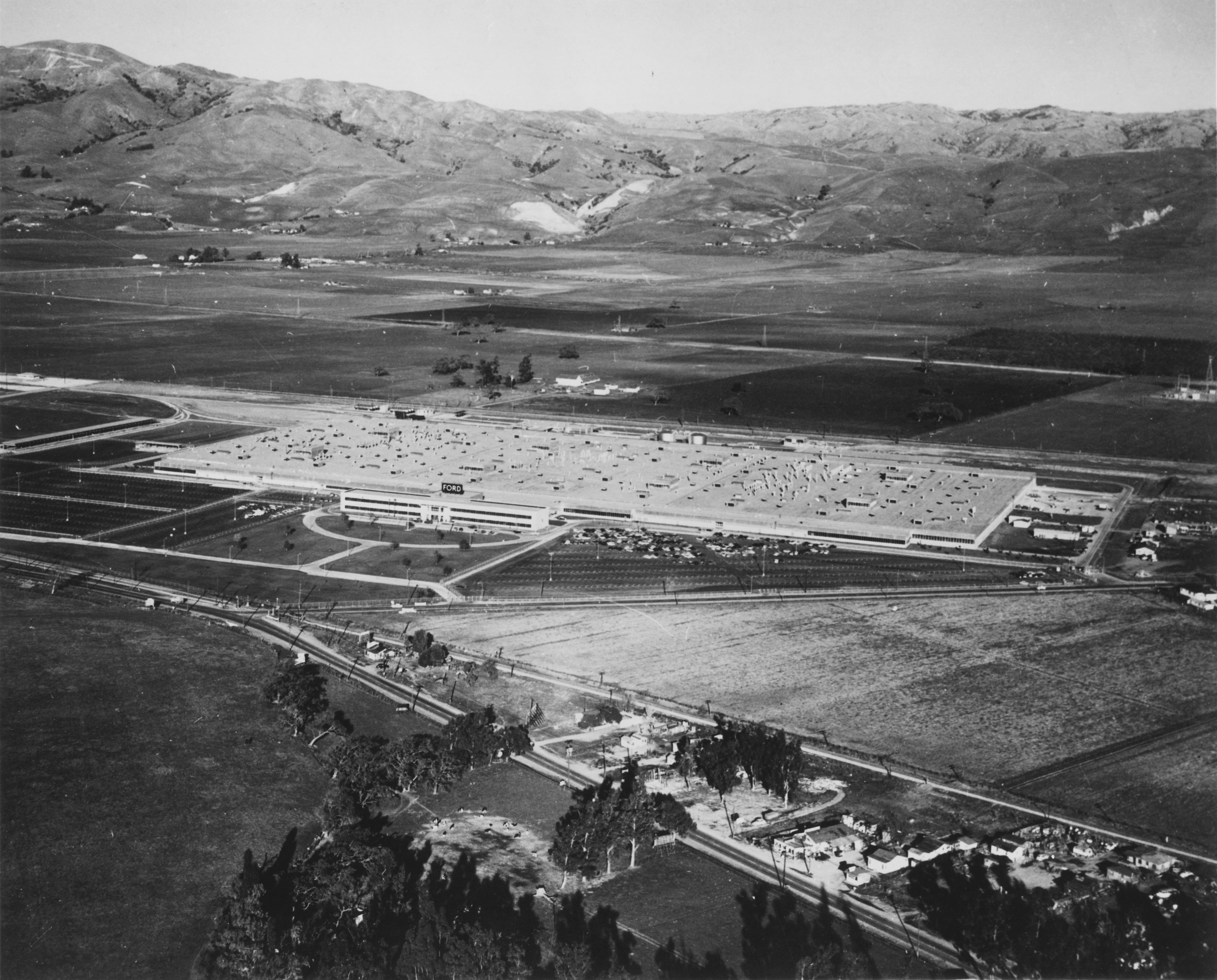
- Aerial view of the San Jose Assembly plant, shortly after it was completed in 1955
- Operated: May 17, 1955–May 20, 1983
- Location: Santa Clara County, California
- Coordinates: 37°24′57″N 121°53′53″W
- Industry: Automotive
- Products: Automobiles and pickup trucks
- Employees: approx. 6,000
- Area: 1,414,000 square feet (131,400 m^{2})
- Owner: Ford Motor Company
- Defunct: July 5, 1993

San Jose Assembly was a Ford Motor Company manufacturing site in Northern California, outside of San Jose in what is now the town of Milpitas. It was the automaker's primary factory in that region from 1955 to 1983, replacing the Richmond Assembly facility.

== History ==
Personnel and equipment were transferred from Richmond to San Jose starting February 23, 1955. The last truckload of equipment was scheduled to depart Richmond on February 26, 1955, with most of the transfer work performed by Ford employees working overtime.

It was one of only three locations where Ford manufactured the Mustang; the other sites were Dearborn Assembly and Edison Assembly.

It was one of the first plants in the nation to which the term "automation" was applied because most of the assembly line was interlinked and did not depend on human control.

The plant closed in 1983, citing competition from Japanese imports and the building reopened as a mall in 1994, the Great Mall of the Bay Area. Four of the access roads to the mall are named after Ford vehicles built at the factory: Fairlane Drive, Falcon Drive, Mustang Drive, and Comet Drive.

== Products ==
Numerous vehicles were produced at the plant including the Ford Falcon, Ford Galaxie, Ford Maverick and Ford Mustang. It was also the West Coast manufacturing location of the Ford Fairlane, Ford Torino, Ford Pinto, Ford Escort and the short lived Edsel Ranger and Edsel Pacer. Mercury products such as the Mustang-based Cougar, Montego, Comet, Bobcat, Capri and the Lynx were also assembled there. Ford F-series trucks were produced there, from shortly after the inception of the plant until its closure in 1983.

== See also ==
- List of Ford factories
- Fremont Assembly – General Motors vehicle assembly plant in nearby Fremont that closed in 1982, reopened as NUMMI (a GM/Toyota joint venture) in 1984, and now operates as the Tesla Fremont Factory.
