= Roy Brown Jr. =

American automobile designer (1916–2013)

- Born: Roy Abbott Brown Jr. October 30, 1916; Hamilton, Ontario, Canada
- Died: February 24, 2013 (aged 96); Ann Arbor, Michigan, U.S.
- Occupation: Automobile designer
- Children: 4

Roy Abbott Brown Jr. (October 30, 1916 – February 24, 2013) was a Canadian-American car designer and engineer, widely known for styling the Edsel, Ford Motor Company's 1957 attempt at introducing a new mid-line model that became synonymous with failed product development.

"I cried in my beer for two days and then I said, 'The hell with it. Enthusiasm got me where I was, and it'll get me back."

Roy Brown, on the failure of the Edsel and his subsequent demotion: 1965 Interview, Ft lauderdale Sun-Sentinel:

Though initially demoted for his role in the Edsel's reception, Brown would continue his career at Ford as design director for Ford of Britain, — notably designing the well-regarded and highly successful first generation Ford Cortina.

The Edsel's failure did not define his career. In 1963, Henry Ford II said to Brown "sometimes we're judged more by how we handle what looks like failure than success. It looks like you handled it well." Brown would ultimately become an executive designer at Ford's Lincoln-Mercury division.

== Background ==
Brown was born in Hamilton, Ontario to Alice Thurza Fletcher (1897–1992) and Roy Abbott Brown (1894–1987), the latter an engineer for Chrysler. Brown moved with his family at age 15 to Detroit and became an American citizen.

Following his graduation from Detroit Art Academy in 1937, he was hired by General Motors as a designer.

Brown lived in Brooklyn, Michigan and Ft Lauderdale; he died in Ann Arbor, in 2013, from Parkinson's disease and Pneumonia. He was survived by his wife Jeanne Feciashko Brown and children (from his previous wife, Emily Jane Roberts-Brown, 1920-2004): Giorgianna 'Jan' Byron, Reginald Louis Brown, Alice 'Penny' Beesley and Mark Brown.

== Career ==
One day after his graduation from the Detroit Art Academy, Brown took a position with General Motors' Cadillac division, working alongside Bill Mitchell. "The first thing he designed was an instrument panel for the 1939 Cadillac," his son Reg told The Los Angeles Times. He later oversaw design at Oldsmobile.

He later worked with Bell Helicopters and Chris-Craft, founded by his great-uncle. He in the Army in World War II and was hired by Ford Motor Company in 1953, where he was assigned to oversee design of the 1955 Lincoln Futura, the model that would be transformed into TV's Batmobile a decade later. The Lincoln Futura was designed by William M. Schmidt of Ford Styling, who later became VP Styling at Studebaker-Packard Corp. in May, 1955. He retired from Ford in 1974.

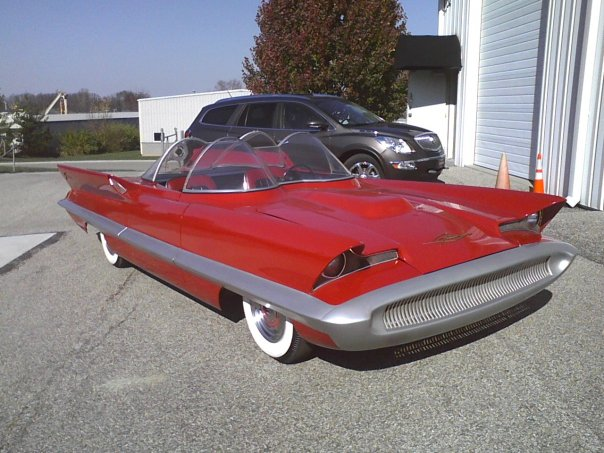
1955 Lincoln Futura, the later Batmobile

=== Edsel ===
Ford next assigned Brown the task of designing a model that would appeal to buyers "with upscale tastes and mid-range budgets." Brown designed a car that "blared individuality." He rejected the tail fins prevalent in that era for rear lights shaped like boomerangs and gave the car a unique vertical front grille. According to Thomas E. Bonsall's book, Disaster in Dearborn (2002), it was assistant stylist Bob "Robin" Jones who suggested a vertical motif for the front end of the "E-car".

The model, named "Edsel" after Henry Ford's only child, rolled into showrooms in 1957, accompanied by a massive publicity campaign. But only 63,000 Edsels were sold in the first year of production, with its distinctive grille being the most criticized feature.

=== Post-Edsel ===
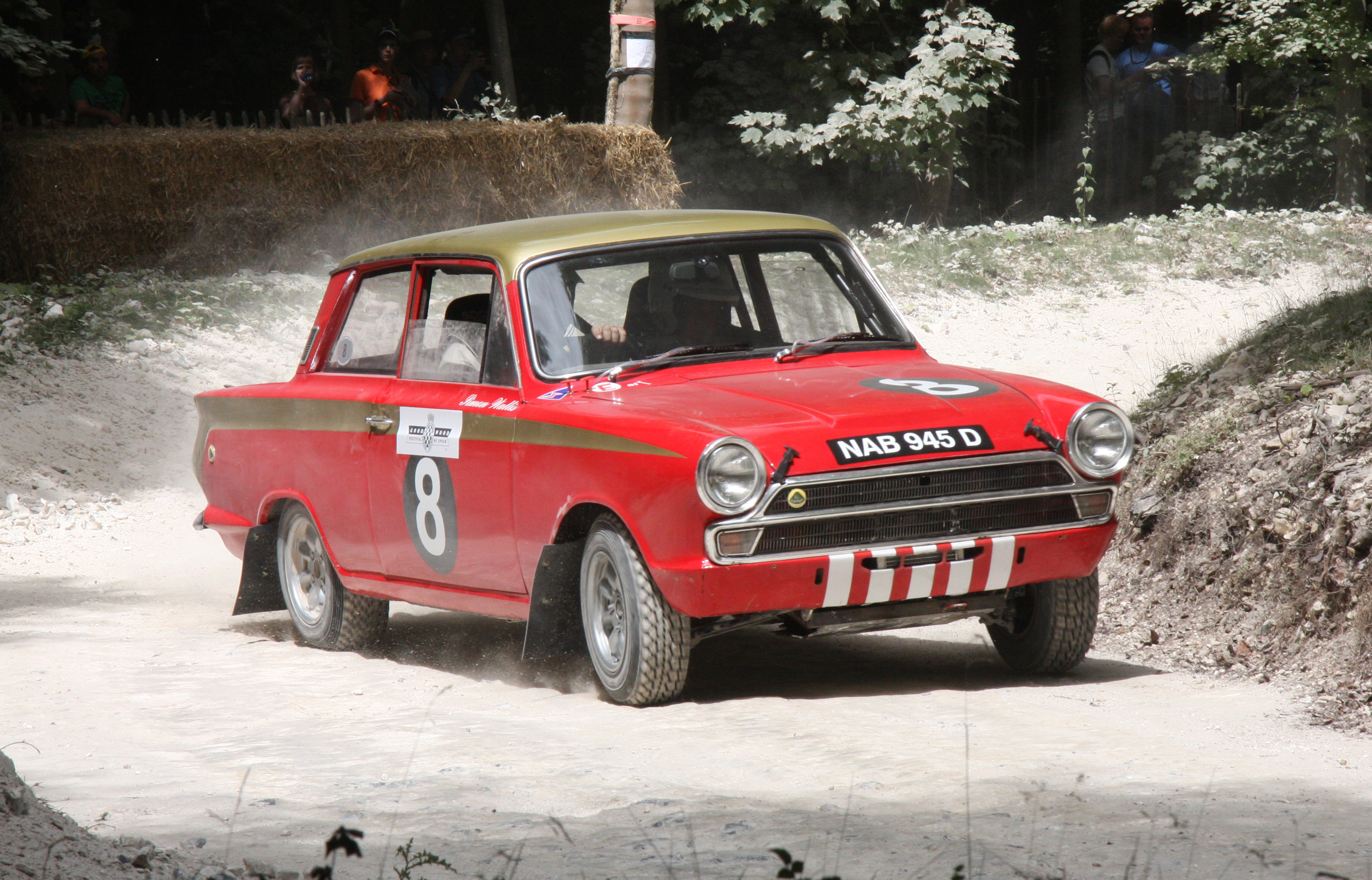
1962 Ford Lotus Cortina Mk1 which was a best seller in UK

Brown gained attention in 1958 for creating the Edsel's grill, enlarged from his earliest sketches in response to engineers' concerns about engine cooling problems, and famously derided in an editorial cartoon as resembling a "horse-collar".

After a demotion, Ford transferred Brown to England, where he designed the 1962 Ford Cortina Mk1, which would become the automaker's best-selling car in Great Britain.

After returning to Detroit in 1966, Brown helped design the Ford Econoline. He later became executive designer in the Lincoln Mercury division. Brown remained with Ford until 1974.

Brown remained a fan of the Edsel and drove an Edsel Pacer convertible into his 90s. "People would ask him, 'What the hell were you thinking when you designed that car?' He was never offended. He was proud of his creation," said Larry Nopper, a past president of the Southlanders Edsel Owners Club.
