= MK 20 =

MK 20 may refer to:

- Mk 20 Mod 0, 40mm automatic grenade launcher
- MK 20 Rh 202, autocannon with a caliber of 20 mm designed and produced by Rheinmetall
- Mk-20 Rockeye, American cluster bomb
- MK 20 SSR, a sniper variant of the FN SCAR
