= Ford FE engine =

Ford FE V8
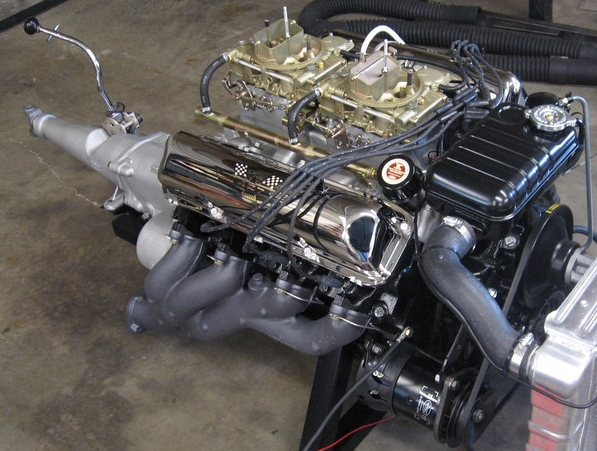

Overview
- Manufacturer: Ford Motor Company
- Also called: Ford FT V8
- Production: 1958–1969 in passenger cars; until 1978 in industrial trucks

Layout
- Configuration: OHV V8

Dimensions
- Dry weight: 650 lb (290 kg)

Chronology
- Predecessor: Ford Y-block V8
- Successor: Ford 335-series engine; Ford 385-series engine

The Ford FE engine is a big-block V8 engine produced in multiple displacements over two generations by the Ford Motor Company and used in vehicles sold in the North American market between 1958 and 1976. The FE, derived from "Ford-Edsel", was introduced just four years after the short-lived Ford Y-block engine, which American cars and trucks were outgrowing. It was designed with room to be significantly expanded, and manufactured both as a top-oiler and side-oiler, and in displacements between 332 cu in (5.4 L) and 428 cu in (7.0 L).

Versions of the FE line designed for use in medium and heavy trucks and school buses from 1964 through 1978 were known as "FT," for "Ford Truck," and differed primarily by having steel (instead of nodular iron) crankshafts, larger crank snouts, smaller ports and valves, different distributor shafts, different water pumps, and a greater use of iron for its parts.

The FE block was manufactured by using a thin-wall casting technique, where Ford engineers determined the required amount of metal and re-engineered the casting process to allow for consistent dimensional results. A Ford FE from the factory weighed 650 lb (295 kg) with all-iron components, while similar 7-liter offerings from GM and Chrysler weighed over 700 lb (318 kg). With an aluminum intake and aluminum water pump, the FE could be reduced to under 600 lb (272 kg) for racing.

The engine was produced in 406 and 427 cubic-inch competition versions and famously powered Ford GT40 MkIIs to endurance-racing domination in the 24 hours of Le Mans during the mid-1960s.

== Description ==
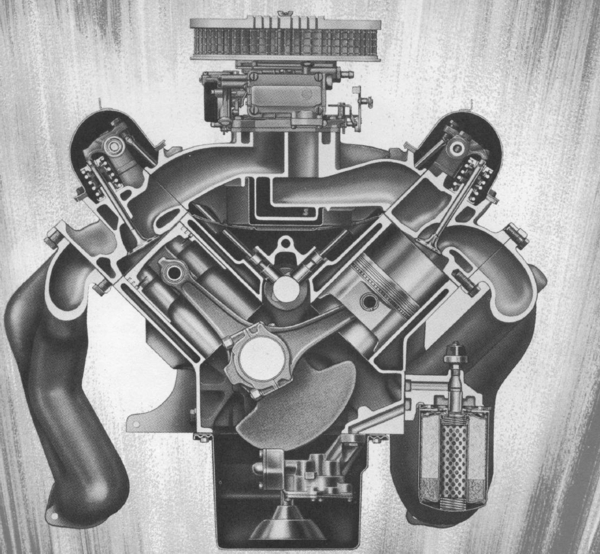
Cutaway showing thin-walled, deep-skirted, Y-shaped FE block (ending above the darker colored rectangular oilpan)

The FE and FT engines are big-block designs, referred to as Y-block because the cylinder block casting extends below the crankshaft centerline, giving great rigidity and support to the crankshaft's main bearings. In these engines, the casting extends 3.625 in (92.1 mm) below the crankshaft centerline, which is more than an inch below the bottom of the crank journals.

Blocks were cast in two major groups: top-oiler and side-oiler. The top-oiler block sent oil to the top center first; the side-oiler block sent oil along a passage located on the lower side of the block first.

All FE and FT engines have a bore spacing of 4.630 in (117.6 mm) and a deck height (distance from crank center to top of block) of 10.170 in (258.3 mm). The main journal (crankshaft bearing) diameter is 2.749 in (69.8 mm). Within the family of Ford engines of the time, the FE was neither the largest nor smallest block.

FE/FT engine displacements
| Displacement | Type | Bore | Stroke |
|---|---|---|---|
| 330 cu in (5.4 L) | FT | 3.875 in (98.4 mm) | 3.500 in (88.9 mm) |
| 360 cu in (5.9 L) | FT | 4.050 in (102.9 mm) | 3.500 in (88.9 mm) |
| 391 cu in (6.4 L) | FT | 4.050 in (102.9 mm) | 3.790 in (96.3 mm) |
| 332 cu in (5.4 L) | FE | 4.000 in (101.6 mm) | 3.300 in (83.8 mm) |
| 352 cu in (5.8 L) | FE | 4.000 in (101.6 mm) | 3.500 in (88.9 mm) |
| 361 cu in (5.9 L) | FE | 4.050 in (102.9 mm) | 3.500 in (88.9 mm) |
| 390 cu in (6.4 L) | FE | 4.050 in (102.9 mm) | 3.785 in (96.1 mm) |
| 406 cu in (6.7 L) | FE | 4.130 in (104.9 mm) | 3.785 in (96.1 mm) |
| 410 cu in (6.7 L) | FE | 4.050 in (102.9 mm) | 3.980 in (101.1 mm) |
| 427 cu in (7.0 L) | FE | 4.232 in (107.5 mm) | 3.785 in (96.1 mm) |
| 428 cu in (7.0 L) | FE | 4.130 in (104.9 mm) | 3.980 in (101.1 mm) |

Ford V8 blocks in the last half of the 20th century, classified by bore spacing
| Small block | | | Big block | | | Big block | | |
| Spacing | Displacement | AKA | Spacing | Displacement | AKA | Spacing | Displacement | AKA |
|---|---|---|---|---|---|---|---|---|
| 4.38 in (111 mm) | 239 cu in (3.9 L) | Y-block | 4.63 in (118 mm) | 332 cu in (5.4 L) | FE | 4.90 in (124 mm) | 383 cu in (6.3 L) | MEL |
| 4.38 in (111 mm) | 272 cu in (4.5 L) | Y-block | 4.63 in (118 mm) | 352 cu in (5.8 L) | FE | 4.90 in (124 mm) | 410 cu in (6.7 L) | MEL |
| 4.38 in (111 mm) | 292 cu in (4.8 L) | Y-block | 4.63 in (118 mm) | 360 cu in (5.9 L) | FE | 4.90 in (124 mm) | 430 cu in (7.0 L) | MEL |
| 4.38 in (111 mm) | 312 cu in (5.1 L) | Y-block | 4.63 in (118 mm) | 390 cu in (6.4 L) | FE | 4.90 in (124 mm) | 462 cu in (7.6 L) | MEL |
| 4.38 in (111 mm) | 260 cu in (4.3 L) | Windsor | 4.63 in (118 mm) | 406 cu in (6.7 L) | FE | 4.90 in (124 mm) | 429 cu in (7.0 L) | 385-series |
| 4.38 in (111 mm) | 289 cu in (4.7 L) | Windsor | 4.63 in (118 mm) | 410 cu in (6.7 L) | FE | 4.90 in (124 mm) | 460 cu in (7.5 L) | 385-series |
| 4.38 in (111 mm) | 302 cu in (4.9 L) | Windsor | 4.63 in (118 mm) | 427 cu in (7.0 L) | FE | | | |
| 4.38 in (111 mm) | 351 cu in (5.8 L) | Windsor | 4.63 in (118 mm) | 428 cu in (7.0 L) | FE | | | |
| 4.38 in (111 mm) | 302 cu in (4.9 L) | 335-series | 4.63 in (118 mm) | 330 cu in (5.4 L) | FT | | | |
| 4.38 in (111 mm) | 351 cu in (5.8 L) | 335-series | 4.63 in (118 mm) | 361 cu in (5.9 L) | FT | | | |
| 4.38 in (111 mm) | 400 cu in (6.6 L) | 335-series | 4.63 in (118 mm) | 391 cu in (6.4 L) | FT | | | |

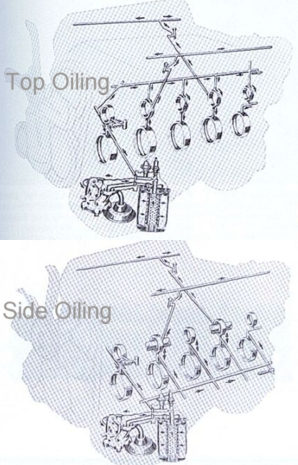
FE oil flow paths

FE engines were made in a wide variety of configurations, including:

- Carbureted, including single two-barrel, single four-barrel, dual four-barrel, triple two-barrel, and quad Webers, or fuel injected
- With a top- or side-oiling block
- With low-rise, medium-rise, high-rise, tunnel-port, or SOHC intake manifolds

The low-rise intake, designed to fit under a low hoodline, was the first. The high-rise intake required a hood bubble for clearance. While the low- and medium-rise heads could be used in combination with either low- or medium-rise intakes, the high-rise head required a high-rise intake due to the increased height of the intake port. The medium-rise intake port is shorter and wider than the low-rise port. The high-rise ports are taller than either the low- or medium-rise ports. Low-rise intakes have the carburetor placed relatively low; the air-fuel mix must follow a more convoluted path to the combustion chambers. A high-rise intake places the carburetor approximately 6 in (152 mm) higher so the air-fuel mixture has a straighter path.

The tunnel-port and SOHC heads require their own matching intakes.

Within the major head groups, differences also existed in combustion-chamber designs - small chambers, machined ones, and large ones. The sizes and types of chambers affect the compression ratio and the overall performance characteristics of the engine.

== Generations ==
=== Generation 1 ===
==== 332 ====
The "332" was the original FE engine, with a displacement of 331.8 cu in (5.4 L), the series' smallest. It had 4.0 in (101.60 mm) bore and a 3.3 in (83.82 mm) stroke, and was used in Ford-brand cars in 1958 and 1959, domestically marketed U.S.- and Canadian-built Edsel-brand cars in 1959, and in export-configured 1958 and 1959 Edsels. The two-barrel version produced 240 bhp (179.0 kW); a Holley or Autolite four-barrel version made 265 bhp (197.6 kW).

===== 332 engine configurations and applications =====
- 4V, 9.5:1 — 265 bhp (197.6 kW) at 4600 rpm and 360 lb⋅ft (488 N⋅m) at 2800 rpm
  - 1958 Ford
  - 1958 Edsel Ranger, Pacer, Villager, Roundup. and Bermuda overseas export vehicles only
- 2V, 8.9:1 — 225 bhp (167.8 kW) at 4600 rpm and 325 lb⋅ft (441 N⋅m) at 2200 rpm
  - 1959 Ford
  - 1959 Edsel Corsair and Villager, standard equipment, (called "Express V8")

==== 352 ====
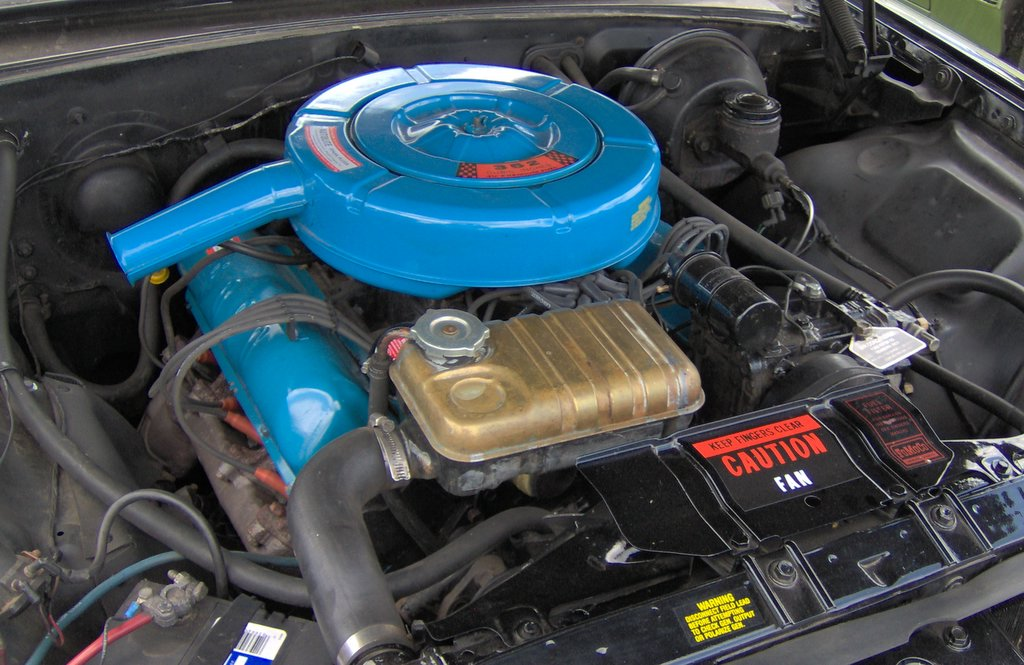
A 352 FE V8 in a 1964 Ford Galaxie 500 XL

Introduced in 1958 as part of the Interceptor line of Ford V8 engines, the Ford 352 of 351.86 cu in (5.77 L) actual displacement was the replacement for the Lincoln Y-block. It is a stroked 332 with 3.5 in (88.90 mm) stroke and a 4 in (101.60 mm) bore, and was rated from 208 bhp (155.1 kW) with a two-barrel carburetor to over 300 bhp (223.7 kW) on the four-barrel models. When these engines were introduced, they were called Interceptor V-8 on the base models and Interceptor Special V-8 on the four-barrel models. The 1958 H VIN-coded 352 was designated as Interceptor V-8 Thunderbird Special. The Interceptor was the base-performance engine in 1958. For the 1959 model year, the FE engine series was renamed the Thunderbird V-8 and the Thunderbird Special V-8. When installed in Mercury vehicles, these engines were named "Marauder". This series of engines usually weighed over 650 lb (295 kg). In 1960, Ford created a high-performance version of the 352 rated at 360 horsepower (270 kW); it featured an aluminum intake manifold, Holley 4100 four-barrel carburetor, cast-iron header-style exhaust manifolds, 10.5:1 compression ratio, and solid lifters.

===== 352 engine configurations and applications =====
- 2V
  - 8.4:1 — 208 horsepower (155 kW) at 4000 rpm and 310 lb⋅ft (420 N⋅m) at 2800 rpm
    - 1965–1967 Ford F-Series
  - 8.9:1 — 220 horsepower (160 kW) at 4400 rpm and 370 lb⋅ft (502 N⋅m) at 2400 rpm
    - 1961–1963 Ford
    - 1961–1963 Mercury (1961 Meteor and 1961–1963 Monterey, Commuter Wagon, Colony Park)
- 4V
  - 10.2:1 — 300 horsepower (220 kW) at 4600 rpm and 395 lb⋅ft (536 N⋅m) at 2800 rpm
    - 1958 Ford Interceptor
    - 1958–1959 Ford
    - 1958–1959 Ford Thunderbird
  - 9.6:1 — 300 horsepower (220 kW) at 4600 rpm and 380 lb⋅ft (515 N⋅m) at 2800 rpm
    - 1960 Ford
    - 1960 Edsel
    - 1960 Ford Thunderbird
  - 10.6:1 — 360 horsepower (270 kW) at 6000 rpm and 380 lb⋅ft (515 N⋅m) at 3400 rpm
    - 1960 Ford
  - 8.9:1 — 235 horsepower (175 kW) at 4400 rpm and 350 lb⋅ft (475 N⋅m) at 2400 rpm
    - 1960 Ford
  - 9.3:1 — 250 horsepower (190 kW) at 4400 rpm and 352 lb⋅ft (477 N⋅m) at 2800 rpm
    - 1964–1966 Ford

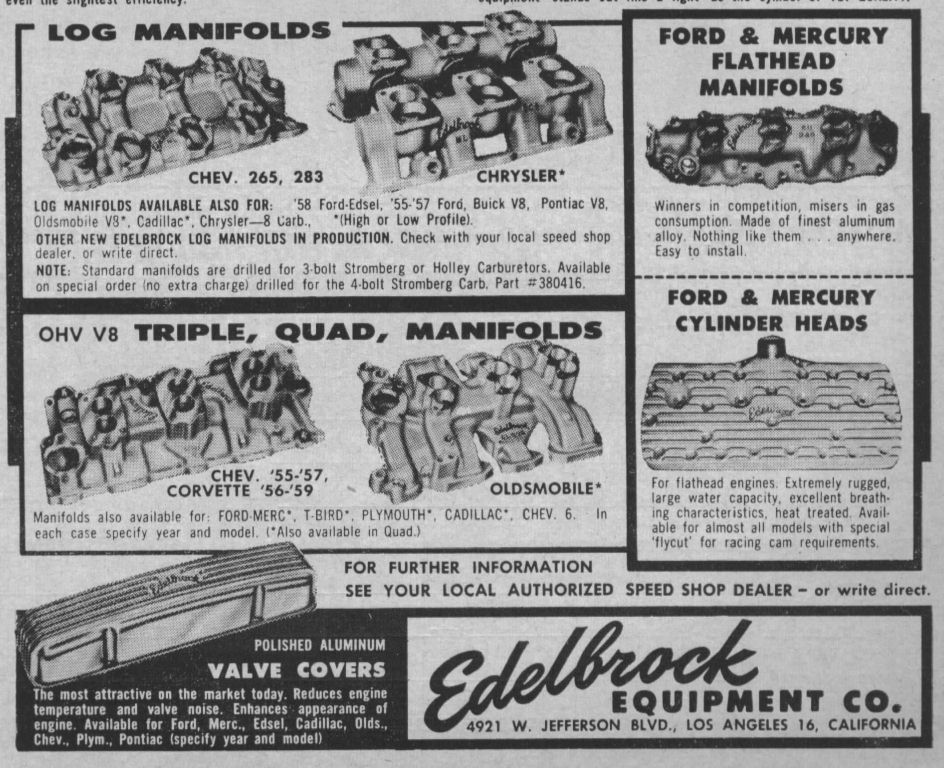
1958 Advertisement for reference

==== 361 Edsel ====
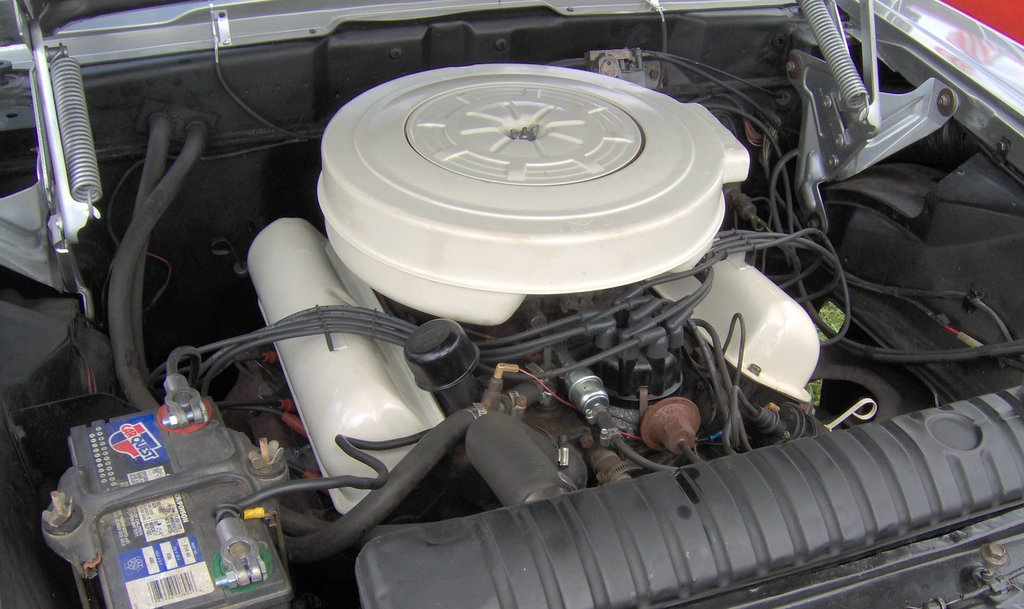
A 361 FE V8 in a 1959 Edsel Corsair

Edsel 361 engines were assembled in Cleveland, Ohio, and Dearborn, Michigan. They were standard equipment in the 1958 Edsel Ranger, Pacer, Villager, Roundup, and Bermuda. The Edsel 361 was the first FE block engine to be offered for sale in any market, having been introduced to the public in the U.S. on September 4, 1957, almost two months before any 1958 Fords were sold. The 361 CID 4V FE engine was also sold on 1959 Edsels in the U.S. and Canada, and 1958 and 1959 Ford- and Meteor-brand automobiles in Canada in place of the 352, which was not available with any Ford Motor Company of Canada brand until the 1960 model year. Edsel 361 engines were available to U.S. law enforcement agencies and state and municipal emergency services purchasing fleet Fords as the 1958 Ford "Police Power Pack".

===== 361 Edsel engine configurations and applications =====
- 4V
  - 10.5:1 compression ratio
  - 303 bhp (225.9 kW) at 4600 rpm
  - 400 lb⋅ft (542 N⋅m) Torque at 2800 rpm
  - 4.0502 inches (102.88 mm) × 3.5 inches (88.90 mm) Bore/Stroke
  - 4-bbl Holley or Ford (Autolite) carburetor
  - Pushrod overhead valve
  - Angle-wedge machined combustion chamber
  - Firing order: 1-5-4-2-6-3-7-8
  - Cylinder numbering (front-to-rear): Right 1-2-3-4 Left 5-6-7-8
  - 18 mm spark plugs, 0.034 in. gap
  - Hydraulic lifters
  - 1958 Edsel Ranger, Pacer, Villager, Roundup, and Bermuda, standard equipment (called "E400")
- 4V
  - 9.6:1 or 10.0:1 Compression Ratio depending on source of information.
  - 303 bhp (225.9 kW) at 4600 rpm
  - 390 lb⋅ft (529 N⋅m) Torque at 2800 rpm
  - 4.0502 inches (102.88 mm) × 3.5 inches (88.90 mm) Bore/Stroke
  - 4-bbl Ford (Autolite) carburetor
  - Pushrod overhead valve
  - Angle-wedge cast combustion chamber
  - Firing order: 1-5-4-2-6-3-7-8
  - Cylinder numbering (front-to-rear): Right 1-2-3-4 Left 5-6-7-8
  - 18 mm spark plugs, 0.034 in. gap
  - Hydraulic lifters
  - 1959 Edsel Corsair, Villager, and Ranger, optional equipment (called "Super Express V8")

==== 360 Truck ====
The 361/360, of 360.8 cu in (5.9 L) actual displacement, was introduced in 1968 and phased out at the end of the 1976-year run; it was used in the Ford F Series trucks and pickups. It has a bore of a 390 (4.05 inches (102.87 mm)) and used the 352's 3.5 in (88.90 mm) rotating assembly. The 361s and 360s were also constructed with heavy-duty internal components for truck use. Use of a standard 352/390 cam for use in passenger cars along with carburetor and distributor adjustment allowed the 360 to give performance similar to that of the 352 and 390 car engines. Rated at 215 bhp (160.3 kW) at 4100 rpm and 375 lb⋅ft (508 N⋅m) of torque at 2600 rpm (two-barrel carb, 1968). The 360 used the same block, heads, and other parts as a 390, which makes them indistinguishable from each other unless the stroke is measured.

===== 360 Truck engine configurations and applications =====
- 2V, 8.4:1
  - 215 bhp (160.3 kW) at 4100 rpm and 375 lb⋅ft (508 N⋅m) at 2600 rpm
    - 1968–1971 Trucks
  - 196 horsepower (146 kW) net at 4000 rpm and 327 lb⋅ft (443 N⋅m) at 2400 rpm
    - 1972–1976 Trucks

==== 390 ====
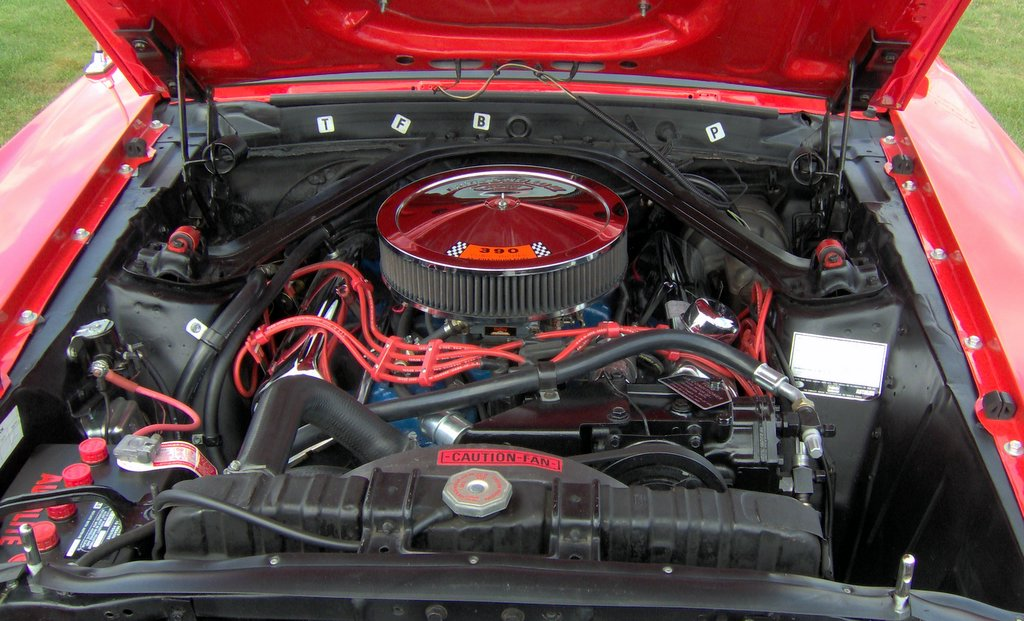
390 FE V8 in a 1969 Ford Mustang

The 390 had a bore of 4.0502 inches (102.88 mm), stroke of 3.785 inches (96.14 mm), and displacement of 390.04 cu in (6.4 L). It was the most common FE engine in later applications and was used in many Ford cars as the standard engine, including the Thunderbird, and in many trucks, as well. It was a popular high-performance engine; although not as powerful as the 427 and 428 models, it provided good performance, particularly in lighter-weight vehicles. The 390 cu in (6.4 L) 2V is rated at 265 bhp (197.6 kW) at 4,100 rpm, while the 4V version was rated at 320 bhp (238.6 kW) at 4,100 rpm in certain applications. Certain 1967 and 1968 Mustangs had 390 4V engines rated at 335 horsepower (250 kW), as did some Fairlane GTs and S-code Mercury Cougars. When the 390 was first offered for 1961 model, a 375 horsepower (280 kW) High Performance version featured an aluminum 4V intake manifold, cast-iron "header" style exhaust manifolds, 10.5:1 compression ratio, and solid-lifter valve train. Many of these cars came with an aluminum 3 × 2Vl intake manifold in the trunk that was meant to be installed by the dealer and raised the engine's output to 401 horsepower (299 kW).

===== 390 engine configurations and applications =====
- 2V
  - 8.9:1 — 250 horsepower (190 kW) at 4400 rpm and 376 lb⋅ft (510 N⋅m) at 2400 rpm
    - 1963–1965 Mercury
  - 9.4:1 — 266 horsepower (198 kW) at 4600 rpm and 376 lb⋅ft (510 N⋅m) at 2400 rpm
    - 1964–1965 Mercury
  - 9.5:1 — 275 horsepower (205 kW) at 4400 rpm and 401 lb⋅ft (544 N⋅m) at 2600 rpm
    - 1966 Ford
    - 1966 Ford Fairlane
    - 1966 Mercury
    - 1966 Mercury Comet
  - 9.5:1 — 270 horsepower (200 kW) at 4400 rpm and 401 lb⋅ft (544 N⋅m) at 2600 rpm
    - 1967 Ford
    - 1967–1968 Ford Fairlane
    - 1967 Mercury
    - 1967 Mercury Comet
    - 1968 Ford Mustang
    - 1968 Mercury Cyclone GT
    - 1968 Mercury Cougar GT
  - 10.5:1 — 280 horsepower (210 kW) at 4600 rpm and 427 lb⋅ft (579 N⋅m) at 2800 rpm
    - 1968 Ford
    - 1969 Mercury
  - 9.5:1 — 265 horsepower (198 kW) at 4400 rpm and 401 lb⋅ft (544 N⋅m) at 2600 rpm
    - 1968 Ford Fairlane
    - 1968 Ford Torino
    - 1968–1970 Ford
    - 1968–1970 Mercury
  - 8.6:1 — 255 horsepower (190 kW) at 4400 rpm and 374 lb⋅ft (507 N⋅m) at 2600 rpm
    - 1968–1971 Trucks
  - 9:1 — 255 horsepower (190 kW) at 4400 rpm and 374 lb⋅ft (507 N⋅m) at 2600 rpm
    - 1971 Ford, Mercury
  - 8.2:1 — 201 horsepower (150 kW) net at 4000 rpm and 360 lb⋅ft (488 N⋅m) at 2600 rpm
    - 1972–1975 Trucks
- 4V
  - 10.6:1 — 375 horsepower (280 kW) at 6000 rpm and 427 lb⋅ft (579 N⋅m) at 3400 rpm
    - 1961–1962 Ford
  - 9.6:1 — 300 horsepower (220 kW) at 4600 rpm and 427 lb⋅ft (579 N⋅m) at 2800 rpm
    - 1961–1963 Ford
    - 1961–1963 Ford Thunderbird
    - 1963 Mercury
  - 9.6:1 — 330 horsepower (250 kW) at 5000 rpm and 427 lb⋅ft (579 N⋅m) at 3200 rpm
    - 1961–1963 Ford Police Interceptor
    - 1963 Mercury Police Interceptor
  - 10.1:1 — 330 horsepower (250 kW) at 5000 rpm and 427 lb⋅ft (579 N⋅m) at 3200 rpm
    - 1964 Ford Police Interceptor
    - 1964 Mercury Police Interceptor
  - 11:1 — 300 horsepower (220 kW) at 4600 rpm and 427 lb⋅ft (579 N⋅m) at 2800 rpm
    - 1964–1965 Ford
    - 1964–1965 Mercury
    - 1964–1965 Ford Thunderbird
  - 10.5:1 — 315 horsepower (235 kW) at 4600 rpm and 427 lb⋅ft (579 N⋅m) at 2800 rpm
    - 1966–1967 Ford
    - 1966–1968 Ford Thunderbird
    - 1968 Mercury
  - 10.5:1 — 335 horsepower (250 kW) at 4600 rpm and 427 lb⋅ft (579 N⋅m) at 3200 rpm
    - 1967, 1969 Ford Mustang
    - 1967, 1969 Ford Fairlane
    - 1967, 1969 Mercury Cyclone GT
    - 1967, 1969 Mercury Cougar GT
    - 1969 Ford Torino
    - 1969 Mercury Montego
  - 10.5:1 — 325 horsepower (242 kW) at 4800 rpm and 427 lb⋅ft (579 N⋅m) at 2800 rpm
- 3x2V, 10.6:1
  - 401 horsepower (299 kW) at 6000 rpm and 430 lb⋅ft (580 N⋅m) at 3500 rpm
    - 1961–1962 Ford
  - 340 horsepower (250 kW) at 6000 rpm and 430 lb⋅ft (580 N⋅m) at 3500 rpm
    - 1962 Ford
    - 1962–1963 Ford Thunderbird

=== Generation 2 ===
==== 406 ====
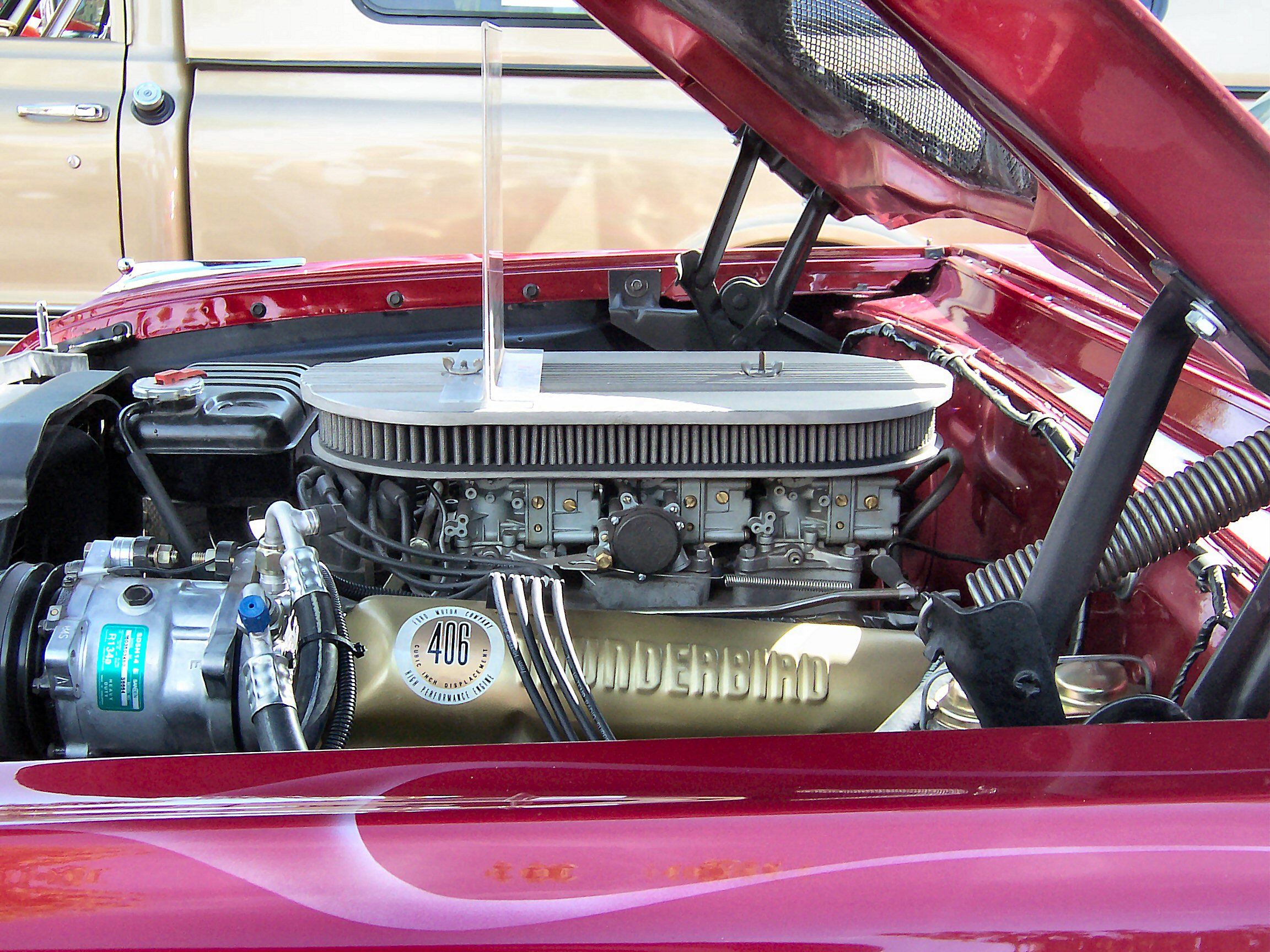
406 with TriPower intake and carbs, on a Ford Galaxie

The 406 engine was introduced in 1962 and only lasted to 1963, giving way to the 427. It used a new 4.13-inch (104.90 mm) bore with the 390's 3.785-inch (96.14 mm) stroke, giving a displacement of 405.7 cu in (6.6 L), rounded up to "406" for the official designation. The larger bore required a new block-casting design, allowing for thicker walls, but otherwise was very similar to the 390 block.

Testing of the 406, with its higher power levels, led to cross-bolted mains - main bearing caps that were secured not only by bolts at each end coming up from beneath, but also by bolts coming in from the sides through the block. A custom-fit spacer was used between the cap and the block face. This design prevented the main bearing caps from "walking" under extreme racing conditions, and can be found today in many of the most powerful and modern engines from many manufacturers.

===== 406 engine configurations and applications =====
- 4V, 11.4:1 — 385 horsepower (287 kW) at 5800 rpm and 444 lb⋅ft (602 N⋅m) at 3400 rpm
  - 1962–1963 Ford
  - 1963 Mercury
- 3x2V, 11.4:1 — 405 horsepower (302 kW) at 5800 rpm and 448 lb⋅ft (607 N⋅m) at 3500 rpm
  - 1962 Ford
- 3x2V, 12.1:1 — 405 horsepower (302 kW) at 5800 rpm and 448 lb⋅ft (607 N⋅m) at 3500 rpm
  - 1963 Ford, Mercury

==== 410 ====
The 410 engine, used in 1966 and 1967 Mercurys (see Ford MEL engine regarding 1958 senior series Edsels), used the same 4.0502 in (102.88 mm) bore as the 390 engine, but with the 428's 3.98 in (101.09 mm) stroke, giving a 410.1 cu in (6.7 L) real displacement. The standard 428 crankshaft was used, which meant that the 410, like the 428, used external balancing. A compression ratio of 10.5:1 was standard.

===== 410 engine configurations and applications =====
- 4V, 10.5:1 — 330 horsepower (250 kW) at 4600 rpm and 444 lb⋅ft (602 N⋅m) at 2800 rpm
  - 1966–1967 Mercury

==== 427 ====
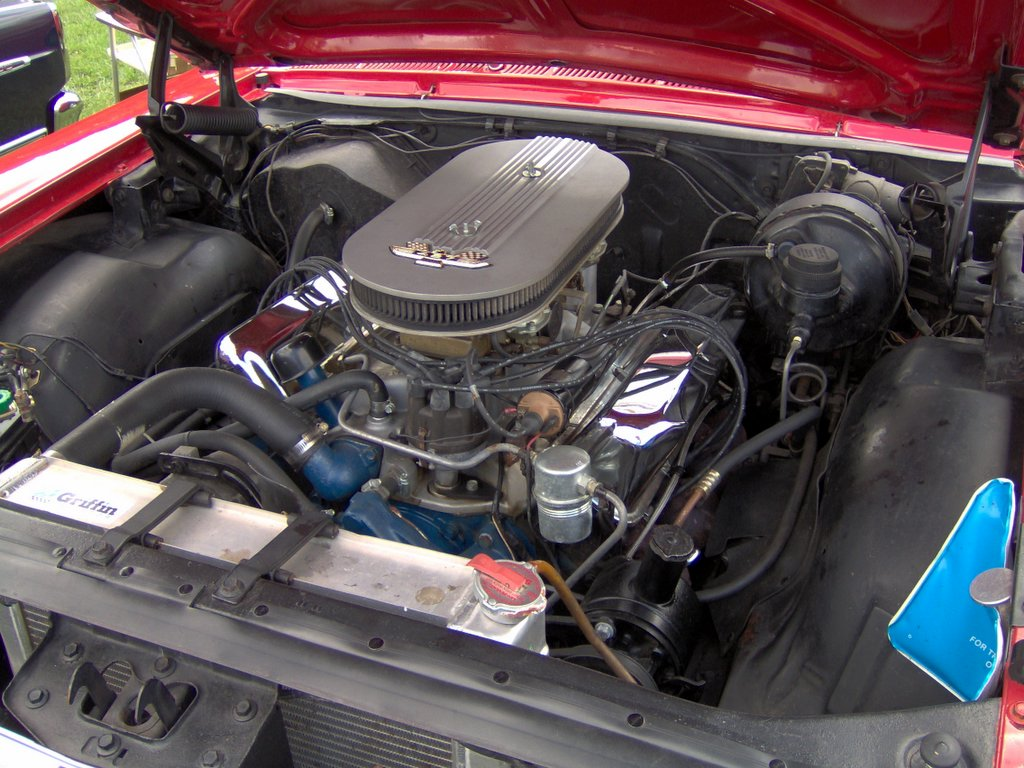
A 427 FE V8 in a 1966 Galaxie XL

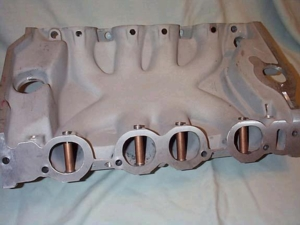
Tunnel-port intake showing the brass tubes for the pushrods to pass through

The 427 V8 was introduced in 1963 as a "top-oiler", changed to a side-oiler in 1965. Despite the "427" designation, its true displacement was 425.98 cu in (6,981 cc). The stroke was the same as the 390 at 3.785 inches (96.14 mm), but the bore was increased to 4.232 inches (107.49 mm). The block was made of cast iron with a specially thickened deck to withstand higher compression. The cylinders were cast using cloverleaf molds; the corners were thicker all down the wall of each cylinder. Many 427s used a steel crankshaft, and all were balanced internally. Most 427s used solid valve lifters, with the exception of the 1968 block, which had oil passages drilled for hydraulic lifters. Higher-flow heads were available with matching "tunnel-port" intake manifolds, which routed pushrods through the intake's ports in brass tubes. As an engine designed for racing, it had many performance parts available both from the factory and the aftermarket. This engine was also used in the A/FX-cars like the famous Fairlane Thunderbolt.

Two different 427 blocks were produced, the initial 1963 top oiler and starting in 1965 a side oiler. The top oiler delivered oil to the cam and valvetrain first and the crank second; the side oiler sent oil to the crank first and the cam and valvetrain second. This was similar to the oiling design from the earlier Y-block. The engine was available with low-rise, medium-rise, or high-rise manifolds, and either single or double four-barrel carburetors on an aluminum intake.matched to corresponding head design Ford never released an official power rating.

The side oiler-powered Ford GT40 MkIIs led to a 1-2-3 finish in the 1966 24 Hours of Le Mans, and the winner's podium in 1967.

===== 427 engine configurations and applications =====
- Low-riser intake, 4V
  - 10.9:1 — 390 horsepower (290 kW) at 5600 rpm and 460 lb⋅ft (620 N⋅m) at 3200 rpm
    - 1968 Mercury Cougar GT-E only (it was to be offered in the Ford Mustang, according to early press releases, but there are no records or verification of any factory 427 Mustangs). In the spring of 1968, the 428 Cobra Jet officially replaced the 427; however, leftover 427s were installed until late June of that year, when stocks were depleted.
  - 11.6:1 — 410 hp (416 PS; 306 kW) at 5600 rpm and 476 lb⋅ft (645 N⋅m) at 3400 rpm
    - 1963–1964 Ford
    - 1963–1964 Mercury
- Low-riser intake, 2×4V
  - 12:1 — 425 horsepower (317 kW) at 6000 rpm and 480 lb⋅ft (651 N⋅m) at 3700 rpm
    - 1964 Ford Fairlane Thunderbolt, Mercury:
- High-riser intake, 2×4V
  - 13.6:1 — +550 horsepower (410 kW) at 7000 rpm and 480 lb⋅ft (651 N⋅m) at 4700 rpm
    - 1966–1967 Ford Fairlane 500 "R-Code", Mercury
- Mid-riser intake, 4V
  - 11.0:1 — 410 horsepower (310 kW) at 5600 rpm and 476 lb⋅ft (645 N⋅m) at 3400 rpm
    - 1965–1967 Ford
    - 1965–1967 Mercury
- Mid-riser intake, two 4-barrel Holley 780 CFM carburetor
  - 11.5:1 — 425 hp (431 PS; 317 kW) at 6000 rpm and 480 lb⋅ft (651 N⋅m) at 3700 rpm
    - 1965–1967 Ford
    - 1965–1967 Mercury
    - 1965–1967 Shelby Cobra 427.

===== 427 SOHC "Cammer" =====
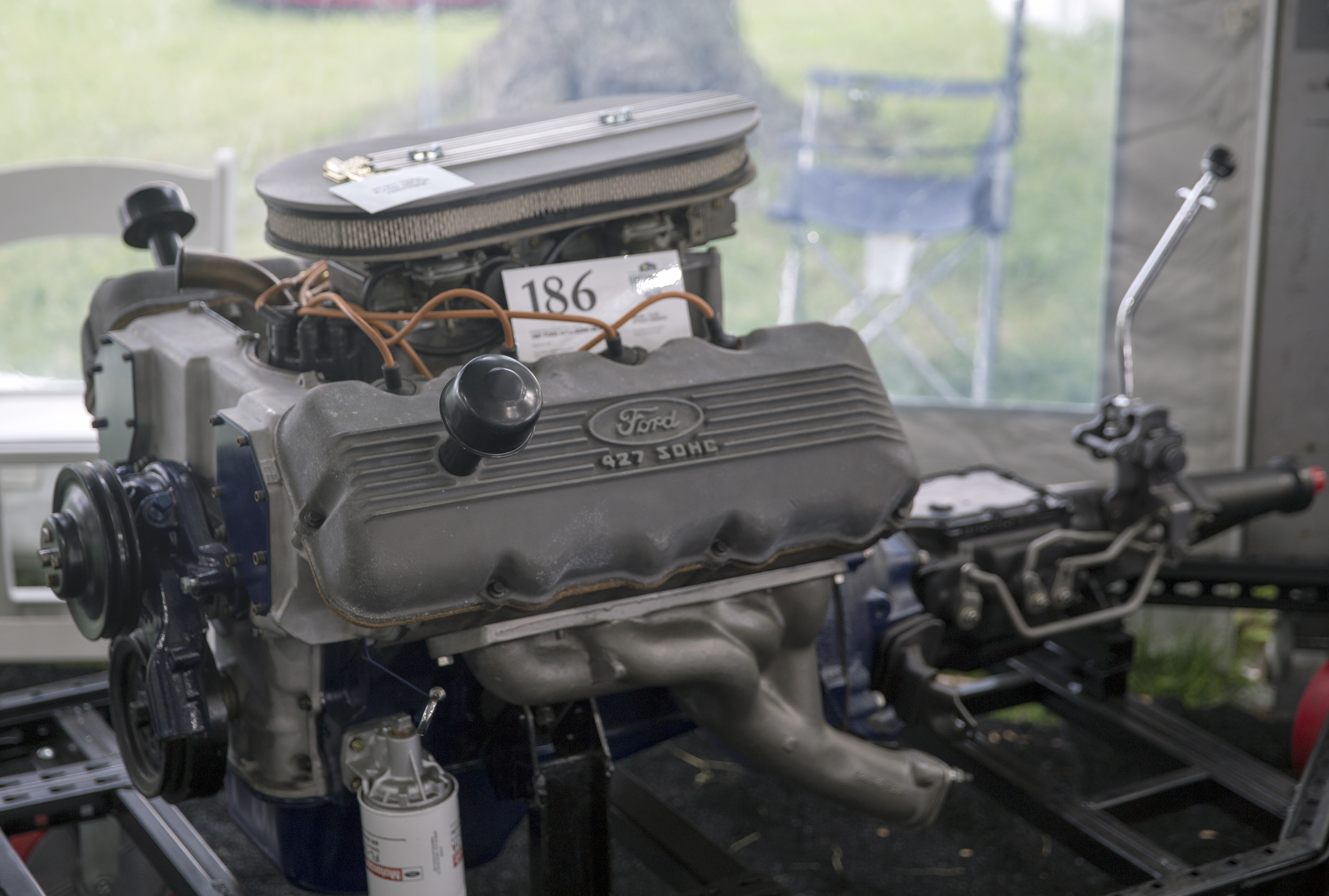
A 427 Cammer once used by Ford's "X-Garage" skunkworks

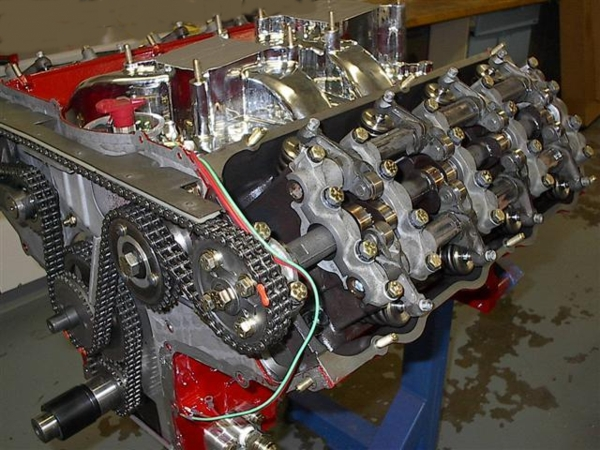
Ford's 427 CID/7.0 L Cammer SOHC hemi-head V8 showing cam, rockers, and timing chains

The Ford single overhead cam (SOHC) 427 V8 engine, familiarly known as the "Cammer", was released in 1964 in an effort to maintain NASCAR dominance by seeking to counter the enormously large block Chrysler 426 Hemi "elephant" engine. The Ford 427 block was closer dimensionally to the smaller 392 CID first-generation Chrysler FirePower Hemi; the Ford FE's bore spacing was 4.63 in (117.6 mm) compared to the Chrysler 392's 4.5625 in (115.9 mm). The Ford FE's deck height of 10.17 in (258.3 mm) was lower than that of the Chrysler 392 at 10.87 in (276.1 mm). For comparison, the 426 Hemi has a deck height of 10.72 in (272.3 mm) and bore spacing of 4.8 in (121.9 mm); both Chrysler hemis have decks more than 0.5 in (12.7 mm) taller than the FE.

The engine was based on the high-performance 427 side-oiler block, providing race-proven durability. The block and associated parts were largely unchanged, but an idler shaft replaced the camshaft in the block, which necessitated plugging the remaining camshaft bearing oiling holes.

The cast-iron heads were designed with hemispherical combustion chambers and a single overhead camshaft over each head, operating shaft-mounted roller rocker arms. The valvetrain consisted of valves larger than those on Ford wedge-head engines, made out of stainless steel and with sodium-filled exhaust valves to prevent the valve heads from burning, and dual valve springs. This design allowed for high volumetric efficiency at high engine speed.

The idler shaft in the block in place of the camshaft was driven by the timing chain and drove the distributor and oil pump in conventional fashion. An additional sprocket on this shaft drove a second "serpentine" timing chain, 6 ft (1.8 m) long, which drove both overhead camshafts. The length of this chain made precision timing of the camshafts an issue at high revolutions.

The engine also had a dual-point distributor with a transistorized ignition amplifier system, running 12 amperes of current through a high-output ignition coil.

The engines were essentially hand-built for racing, with combustion chambers fully machined to reduce variability. Nevertheless, Ford recommended blueprinting before use in racing applications. With a single four-barrel carburetor, they weighed 680 lb (308 kg) and were rated at 616 horsepower (459 kW) at 7,000 rpm and 515 lb⋅ft (698 N⋅m) of torque at 3,800 rpm, with dual four-barrel carburetors 657 horsepower (490 kW) at 7,500 rpm and 575 lb⋅ft (780 N⋅m) of torque at 4,200 rpm. Ford sold them via the parts counter, the single four-barrel model as part C6AE-6007-363S, and the dual carburetor model as part C6AE-6007-359J for $2350.00 (as of October, 1968).

Ford's hopes to counter Chrysler were cut short, though. Enough 427 SOHCs were sold to have the design homologated, but Chrysler protests succeeded in getting NASCAR to effectively legislate the engine out of competition. This was due to the motor not being available in a factory-production motor vehicle.It was not the only engine ever banned from NASCAR; the 1963 Chevrolet 427 "mystery motor", the 1965 426 "Race Hemi", and the Chrysler A-925 DOHC Hemi were also banned during the 1960s for the same reason.

Both the USAC and NASCAR announced their bans on using the SOHC engine in stock car events on 17 December 1965. The USAC commented, “We are simply following our rules which state the engine must be representative of volume production and readily available to the public. Eventually overhead cam engines probably will become part of the American production automobile and thus will meet the requirements. Until that time, however, it is our feeling that in announcing their overhead engine for stock car racing in 1966 the Ford Motor Co. has put the cart before the horse. At this time their proposed overhead cam engine is strictly a racing engine and as such does not meet the spirit of the rules.”

Bill France, NASCAR president, permitted the engine at its drag races, but not at conventional “oval track” stock car circuits: "The single overhead cam engine at present is a race engine and does not fall into the stock car category. We look on it as an experimental engine and as such will evaluate it for the 1967 season.”

Nevertheless, the SOHC 427 found its niche in non-stock drag racing, powering many altered-wheelbase A/FX Mustangs, and becoming the basis for a handful of supercharged Top Fuel dragsters, including those of Connie Kalitta, Pete Robinson, and Lou Baney (driven by Don "the Snake" Prudhomme). In 1967, Connie Kalitta's SOHC-powered "Bounty Hunter" slingshot dragster won Top Fuel honors at AHRA, NHRA, and NASCAR winter meets, becoming the only "triple crown" winner in drag racing history. It was also used in numerous nitrous-oxide funny cars, including those of Jack Chrisman, "Dyno" Don Nicholson, Eddie Schartman, and Kenz and Leslie, and in numerous gasoline-injected drag-racing vehicles.

==== 428 ====
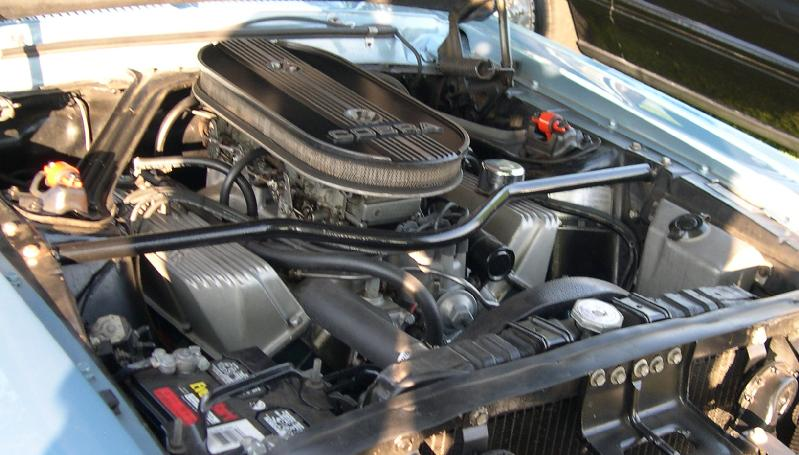
A Ford FE 428 Special Interceptor engine from a 1967 Shelby GT 500

For 1966, Ford combined attributes that had worked well in previous incarnations of the FE – a 4.13 in (104.90 mm) bore and a 3.98 in (101.09 mm) stroke – to create an easier-to-make 428 cu in (7.0 L) engine. It used a cast nodular-iron crankshaft and external balancer.

For 1966 this engine was offered as a 345 horsepower (257 Kilowatts) hydraulic Q-code 428 for standard production cars as well as a 360 horsepower (268 Kilowatts) solid-lifter P-code 428 Police Interceptor for law enforcement vehicles only. The solid-lifter 428 was available in 1966 only, replaced by a hydraulic version in 1967, also a P-code. The new-for-1966 Q-code 428 was also standard in FoMoCo's new full-size sport models which included the Galaxie 500 7-Litre and Mercury Monterey S-55. The 1966 Galaxie 500 7-Litre was the only example in Ford's history of a full-size model ever coming standard-equipped with an engine above 400 cubic inches in displacement. The Q-code 428 was also optional in all 1966 full-size Fords, Mercurys and the Ford Thunderbird which carried over into the 1967 model year. Same for 1968, the last year for Q-code production, except in the case of Thunderbirds which came standard with Ford's new N-code 429 engine. For 1969, full-size Fords & Mercurys began offering the N-code 429 in place of the 428.

The 428 Police Interceptor continued production until the end of the 1970 model year.

===== 428 engine configurations and applications =====
- 4V, 10.5:1
  - 345 horsepower (257 kW) at 4600 rpm and 462 lb⋅ft (626 N⋅m) at 2800 rpm
    - 1966–1967 Q-code Ford
    - 1966–1967 Q-code Ford Thunderbird
    - 1966–1967 Q-code Mercury
    - 1966 Q-code Ford Galaxie 500 7-Litre
    - 1966 Q-code Mercury Monterey S-55
    - 1967 Q-code Ford XL ordered with the "7-Litre Sports Package"
    - 1967 Q-code Mercury Monterey ordered with the "S-55 Sports Package"
  - 360 horsepower (270 kW) at 5400 rpm and 459 lb⋅ft (622 N⋅m) at 3200 rpm
    - 1966 P-code solid lifter Ford & Mercury 428 Police Interceptor
    - 1967–1970 P-code hydraulic lifter Ford & Mercury 428 Police Interceptor
    - 1968 1/2 Shelby GT500KR Interceptor
  - 340 horsepower (250 kW) at 4600 rpm and 462 lb⋅ft (626 N⋅m) at 2800 rpm
    - 1968 Q-code Ford
    - 1968 Q-code Mercury
  - 360 horsepower (270 kW) at 5400 rpm and 420 lb⋅ft (570 N⋅m) at 3200 rpm
    - 1968 Shelby GT500
- 2×4V, 10.5:1 – 355 horsepower (265 kW) at 5400 rpm and 420 lb⋅ft (570 N⋅m) at 3200 rpm
  - 1967 Shelby GT500

===== 428 Cobra Jet =====
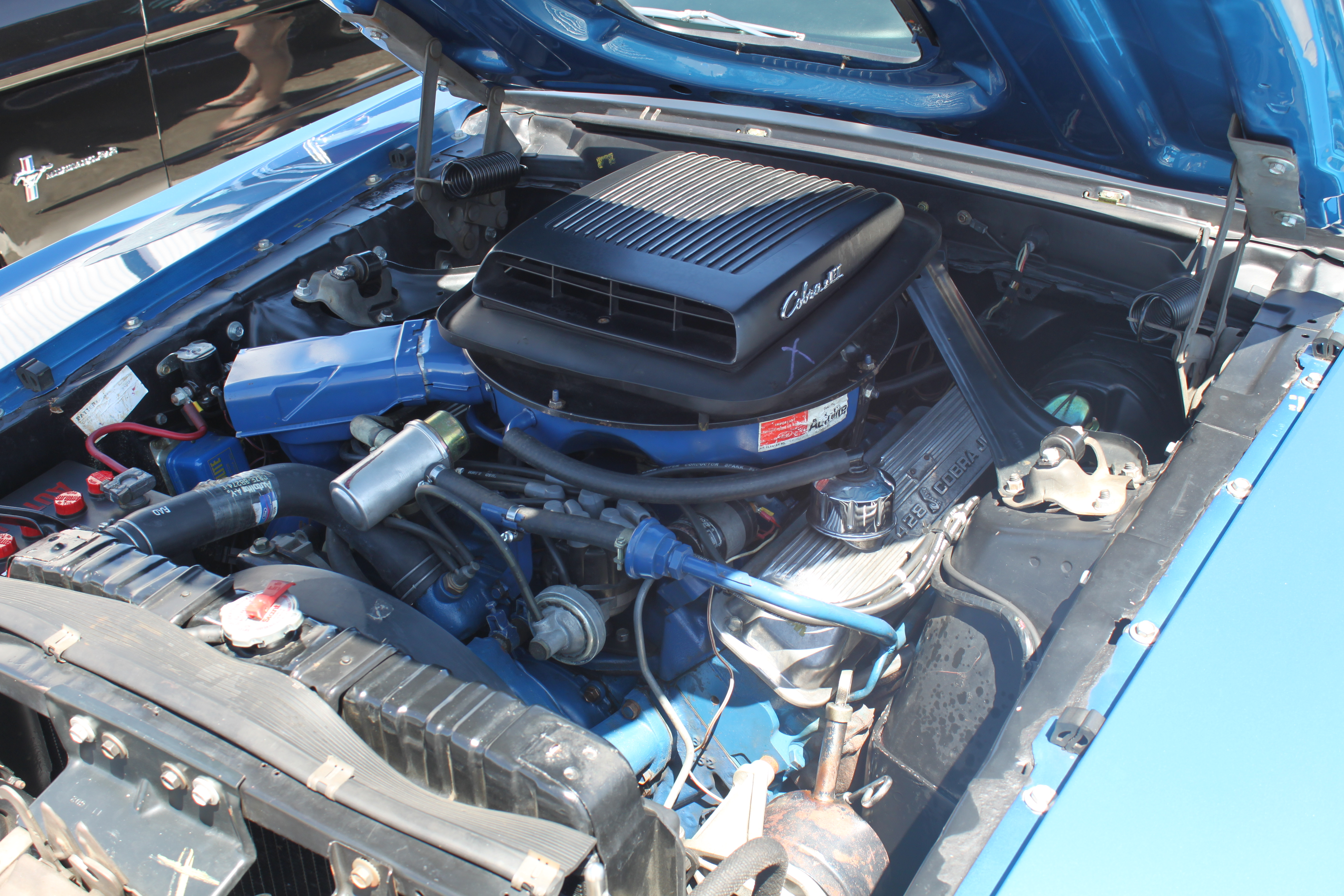
428 CJ with shaker scoop (1969 Mustang)

The 428 Cobra Jet was a performance version of the 428 FE. Launched in April 1968, it was built on a regular production line using a variety of cylinder heads combined with a 735 CFM Holley four-barrel carburetor. The Cobra Jet used heavier connecting rods with a 13/32 in rod bolt and a nodular iron crankshaft casting #1UB. A Holman and Moody specially prepared "stripper", which carried no sound deadener, undercoating, or any optional factory equipment, was used as the introductory press car in 1968.

The 428 Cobra Jet had a compression ratio of 10.8:1 and was rated 335 bhp (250 kW) at 5200 rpm and 440 lb⋅ft (597 N⋅m) at 3400 rpm. Historical road test data on actual production 428 CJ cars suggest peak output in the neighborhood of 275 SAE net ("as installed") HP, using published trap speed and "as tested" weights, and Hale's trap speed formula. Period road tests revealed quarter-mile performance in the low 14-second to very high 13-second range, with trap speeds around 101 to 103 mph (163 to 166 km/h):

The 428 Cobra Jet engine (modified to the NHRA Stock and Super Stock technical specifications) made its drag-racing debut at 1968 NHRA Winternationals, held February 2–4, 1968, at the Auto Club Raceway at Los Angeles County Fairgrounds, in Pomona, California. Ford Motor Company sponsored five drivers (Gas Ronda, Jerry Harvey, Hubert Platt, "Dyno" Don Nicholson, Kenneth McLellan, and Al Joniec) to race six 428 CJ-equipped Mustangs. They raced in classes C Stock Automatic (C/SA, 9 to 9.49 lb/hp (5.47 to 5.77 kg/kW)), based on advertised horsepower) and Super Stock E (SS/E or SS/EA, manual or automatic transmission, respectively, at 8.70 to 9.47 lb/hp (5.29 to 5.76 kg/kW), based on factored horsepower). The engine lived up to expectations, as four of the cars made it to their respective class finals. Al Joniec won both his class (defeating Hubert Platt in an all-CJ final) and the overall Super Stock Eliminator title (defeating Dave Wren, who red lighted in his faster 426 Race Hemi Plymouth).

===== 428 Cobra-Jet engine configurations and applications =====
- Cobra Jet — bore 4.13 in (104.9 mm) × stroke 3.98 in (101.1 mm); valvetrain: OHV two valves per cylinder, naturally aspirated four-barrel Holley carburetor, compression ratio: 10.6:1 rated at 335 horsepower (340 PS; 250 kW) at 5200 rpm and maximum torque of 440 lb⋅ft (597 N⋅m) at 3400 rpm
  - 1968 Ford Mustang
  - 1968 Mercury Cougar
  - 1968 Shelby GT500KR
  - 1968 Ford Fairlane
  - 1968 Ford Torino
  - 1968 Mercury Comet
  - 1968 Mercury Cyclone
  - 1969–1970 Ford Mustang
  - 1969–1970 Mercury Cougar
  - 1969 Ford Fairlane
  - 1969 Ford Torino
  - 1969 Ford Cobra
  - 1969 Mercury Montego, Cyclone and CJ

===== 428 Super Cobra Jet =====
The 428 Super Cobra Jet (also known as the 428 SCJ) used the same top end, pistons, cylinder heads, camshaft, valve train, induction system, exhaust manifolds, and engine block as the 428 Cobra Jet, but the crankshaft and connecting rods were strengthened and associated balancing altered for drag racing. A nodular-iron crankshaft casting #1UA was used, as well as heavier 427 "Le Mans" connecting rods with cap screws instead of bolts for greater durability. The heavier connecting rods and the removal of the center counterweight on the stock 428 Cobra Jet crankshaft (1UA) required an external weight on the snout of the crankshaft for balancing. A 428 Super Cobra Jet engine with oil cooler was standard equipment when the "Drag Pack" option (which came when selecting either a 3.91 or 4.30 rear end gear ratio) was ordered with cars manufactured from 13 November 1968. In addition, while the CJ and SCJ engines used the same autothermic piston casting, the piston-to-bore clearance specification between the CJ and SCJ 428 engines is slightly different, with the SCJ engines gaining a slightly looser fit to permit higher operating temperature. Horsepower measurements at a street RPM level remained the same. The 428 Super Cobra Jet engine was never offered with factory air conditioning due to the location of its engine oil cooler.

===== 428 Super Cobra-Jet engine configurations and applications =====
- Super Cobra-Jet — bore 4.13 in (104.9 mm) × stroke 3.98 in (101.1 mm); valvetrain: OHV two valves per cylinder, naturally aspirated four-barrel Holley carburetor, compression ratio: 10.6:1 rated at 335 horsepower (340 PS; 250 kW) at 5200 rpm and maximum torque of 440 lb⋅ft (597 N⋅m) at 3400 rpm
  - 1969–1970 Ford Mustang
  - 1969–1970 Mercury Cougar
  - 1969 Ford Fairlane
  - 1969 Ford Torino
  - 1969 Ford Cobra
  - 1969 Mercury Montego, Cyclone and CJ

== Use ==
The FE series engines were used in cars, trucks, buses, and boats, as well as for industrial pumps and other equipment. Ford produced the engine from 1958 to 1976. Aftermarket support has continued, with replacement parts and many newly engineered and improved components.

In Ford vehicles, the FE primarily powered full- and midsized cars and trucks, though it was also installed in both pony cars and midsized muscle cars, including in dedicated drag packages such as the 1964 Ford Fairlane Thunderbolt. Ford used the FE in podium-sweeping victories in its GT-40 at the 24 Hours of Le Mans, supported its use in factory associated high-performance Shelby Mustangs, and Shelby made the 427 CID version further famous in his Shelby Cobras.

=== Ford production vehicles ===
Some Ford production models in which the FE was installed:

Ford Galaxie, Ford Custom 500, Ford Mustang, Ford Thunderbird - 3rd generation, Ford Thunderbird - 4th generation, Ford LTD, Ford Torino, Ford Ranchero, Ford Talladega, Ford Fairlane, and F-Series trucks though typically only those 1 ton and lesser in capacity.

Ford regularly made updates to the design of the FE, which appear as engineering codes or variations in casting numbers of parts. In addition to production casting codes, Ford also made use of "SK" and "XE" numbers if the parts were one-offs or developmental designs not approved for production. Many parts attached to Ford's racing engines carried SK and XE numbers.

Selection of vehicles in which the FE was installed as original equipment:

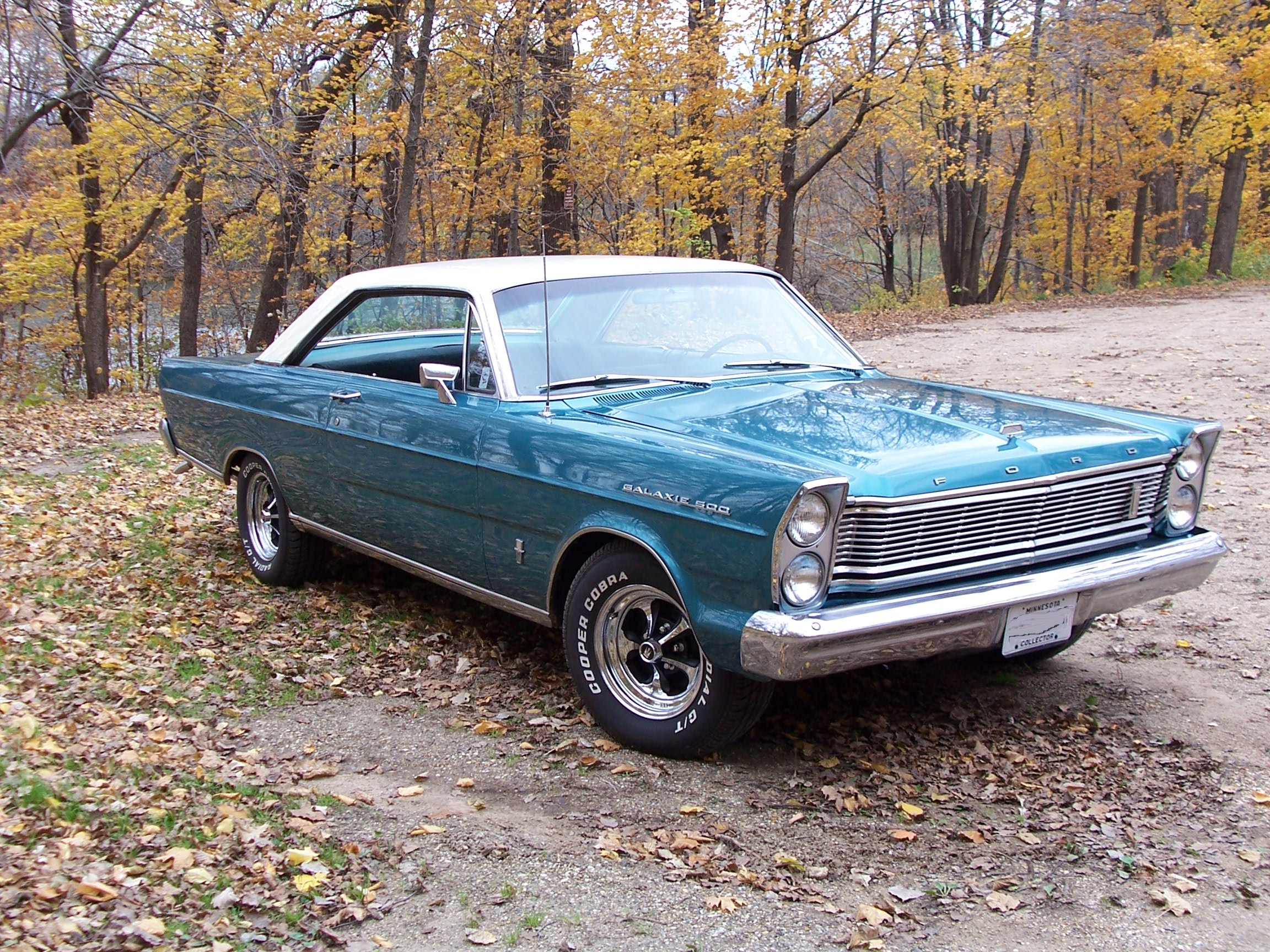
1965 Ford Galaxie

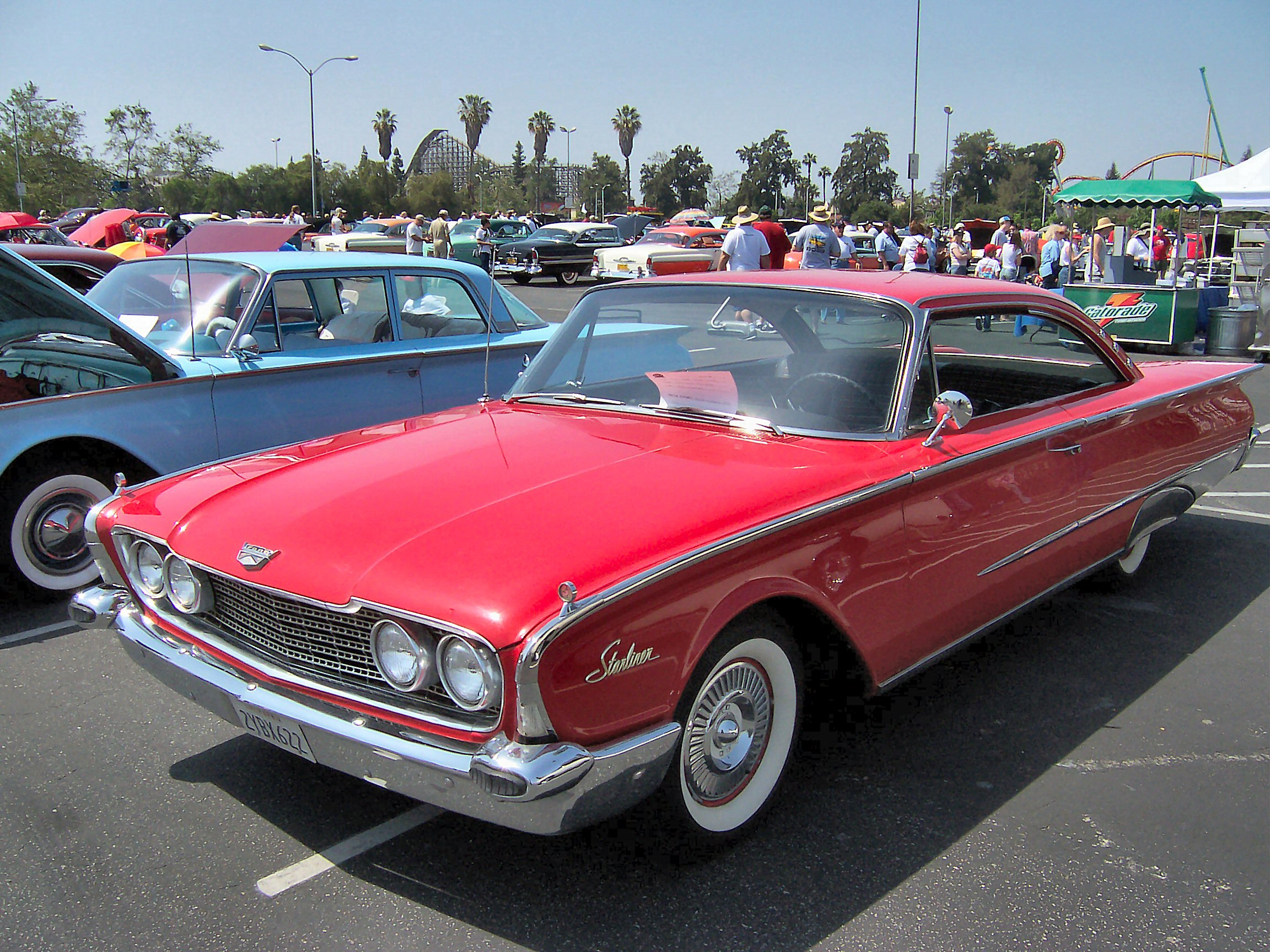
1960 Ford Galaxie Starliner

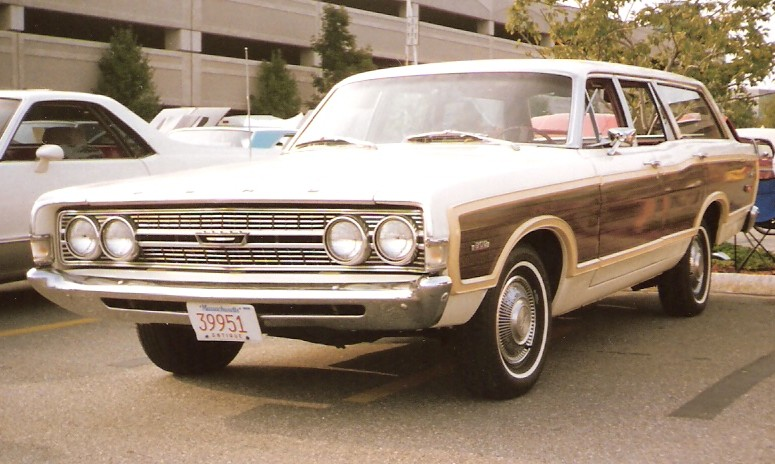
1968 Ford Torino Squire

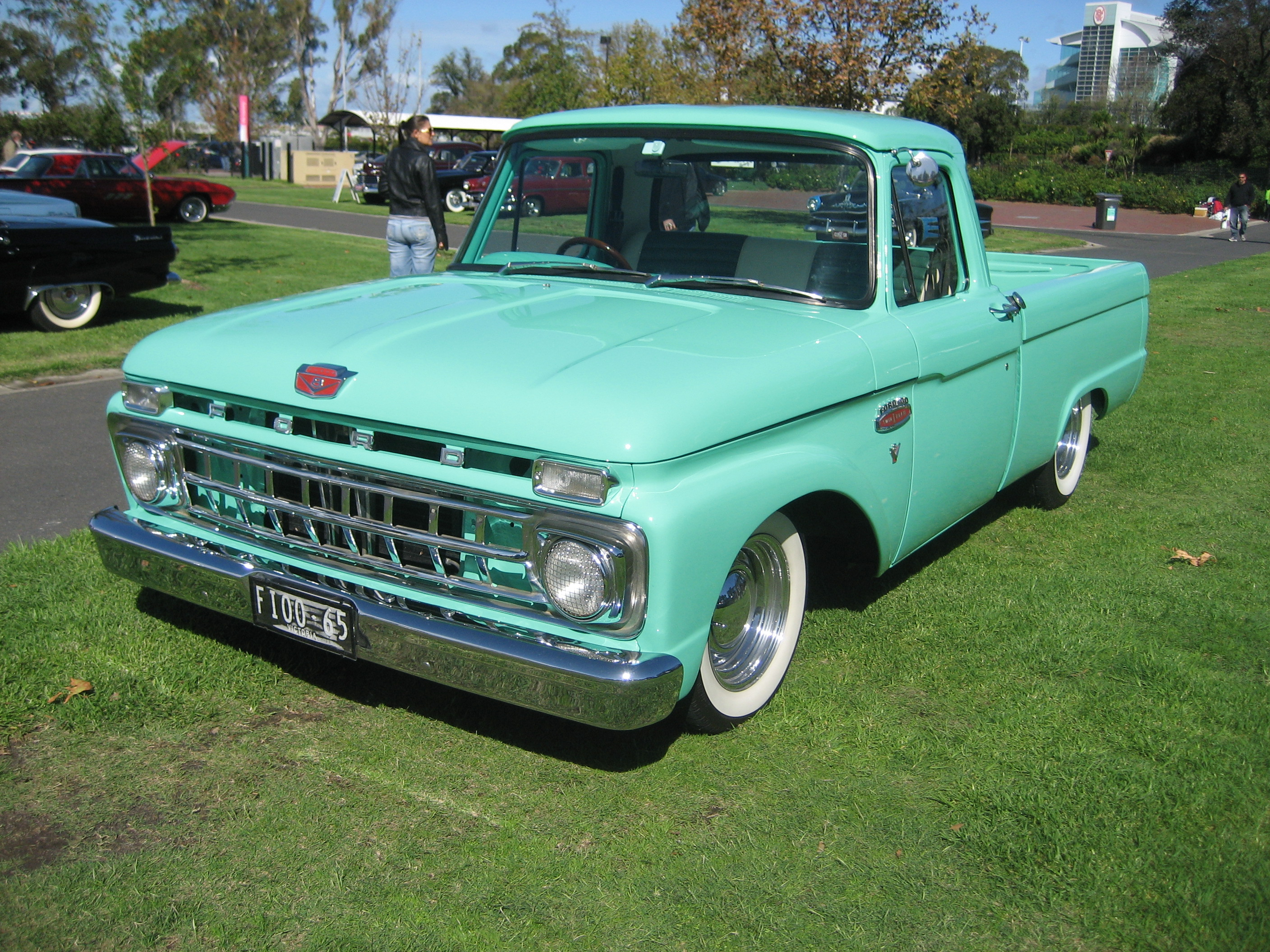
1965 Ford F100 Pick Up

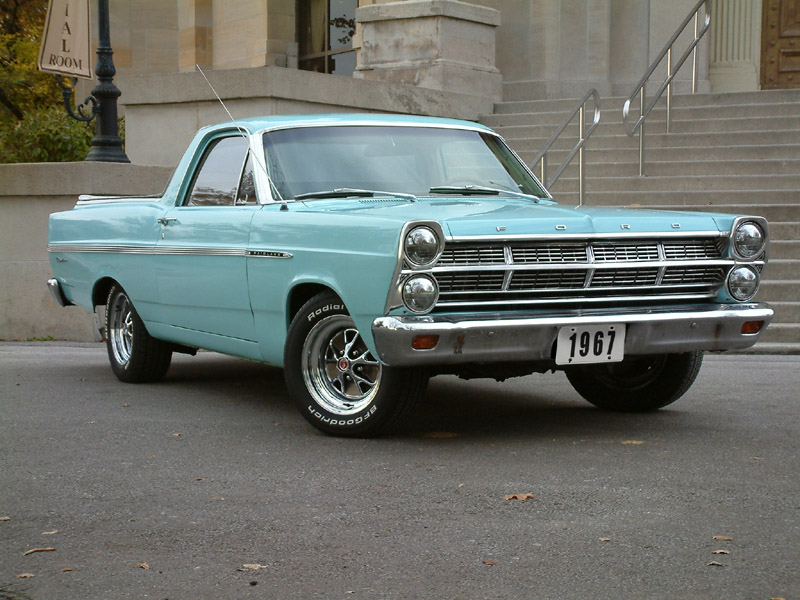
1967 Ford Fairlane Ranchero

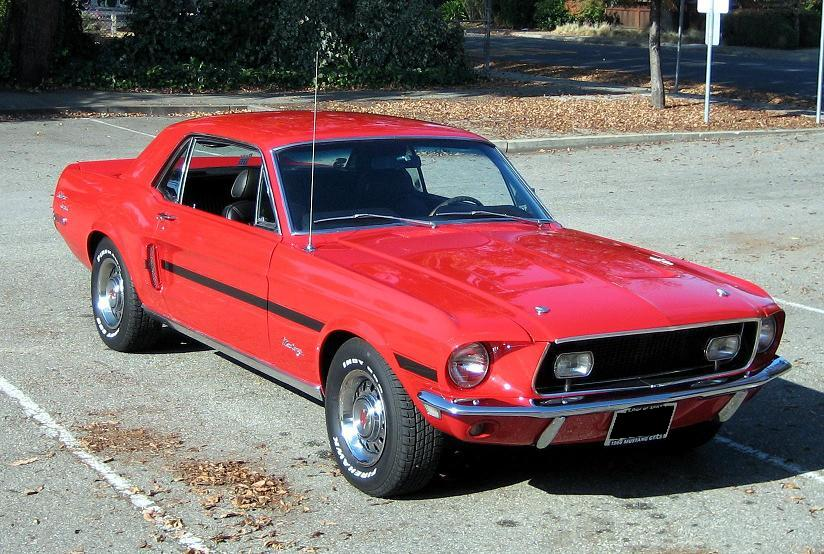
1968 GTCS

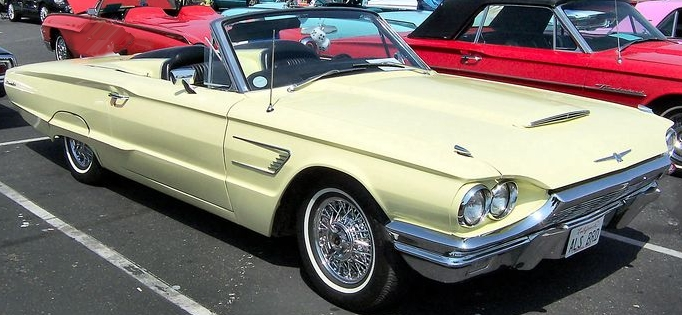
1965 Thunderbird

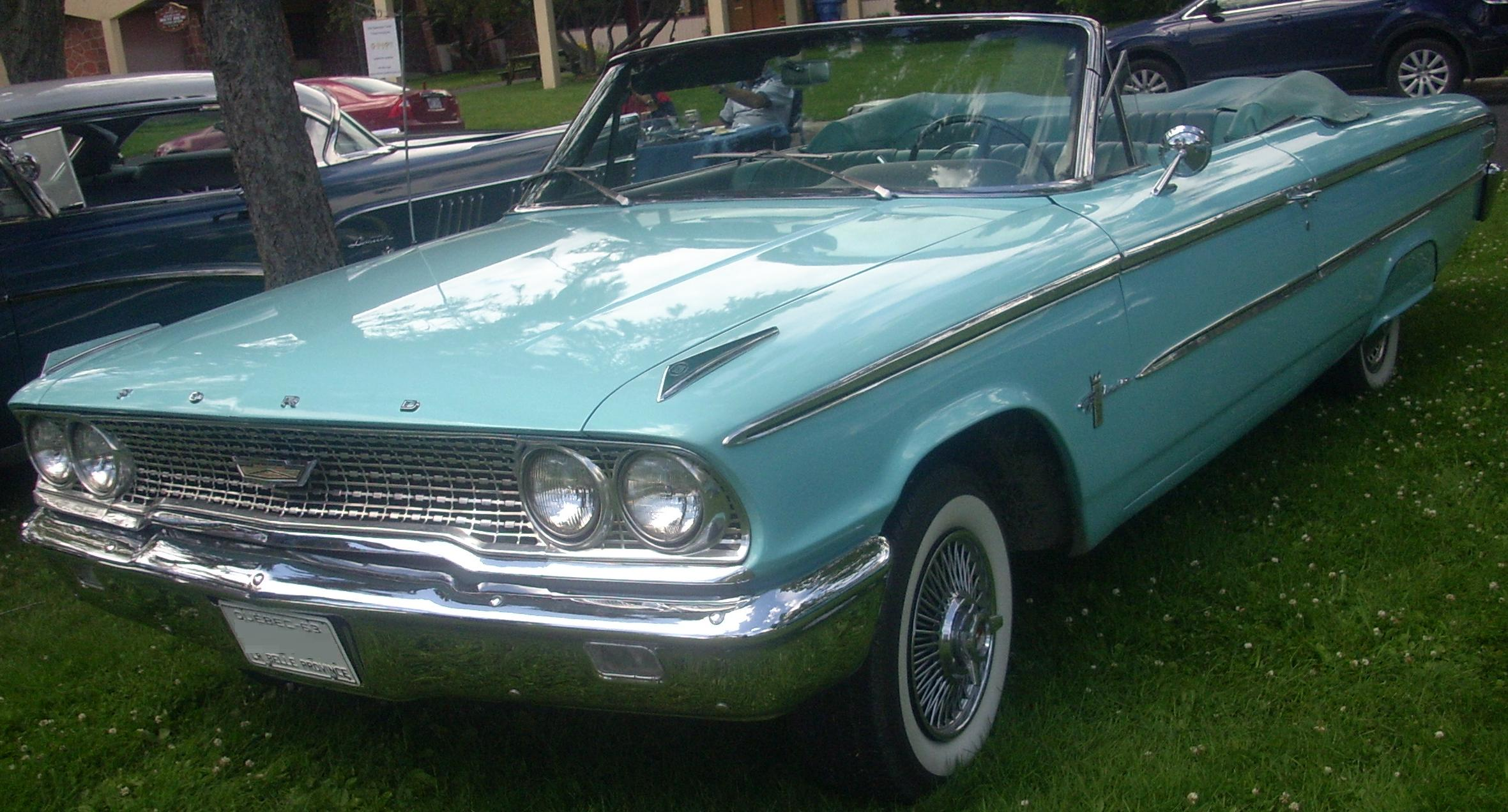
1963 Ford Galaxie 500 Convertible

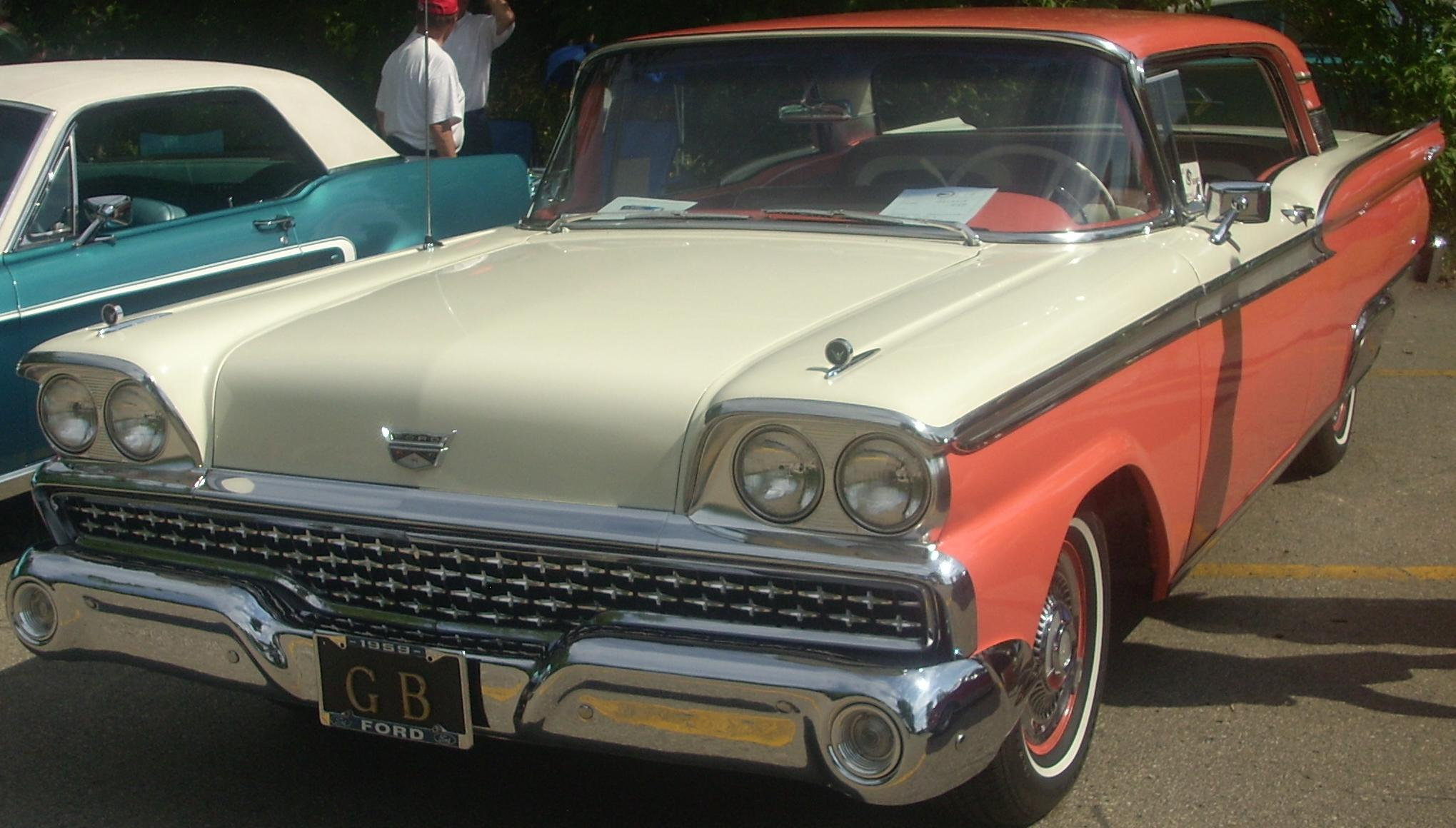
1959 Ford Galaxie

=== Other uses ===
In addition to its use in Ford and Mercury branded vehicles, Ford itself, used it in factory, supported racing teams, and the FE was sold to third parties for use in their own products such as buses, and boats. Also, the FE was used to power irrigation pumps, generators and other machinery where long-running, low-rpm, reliable service was required.

==== In racing ====
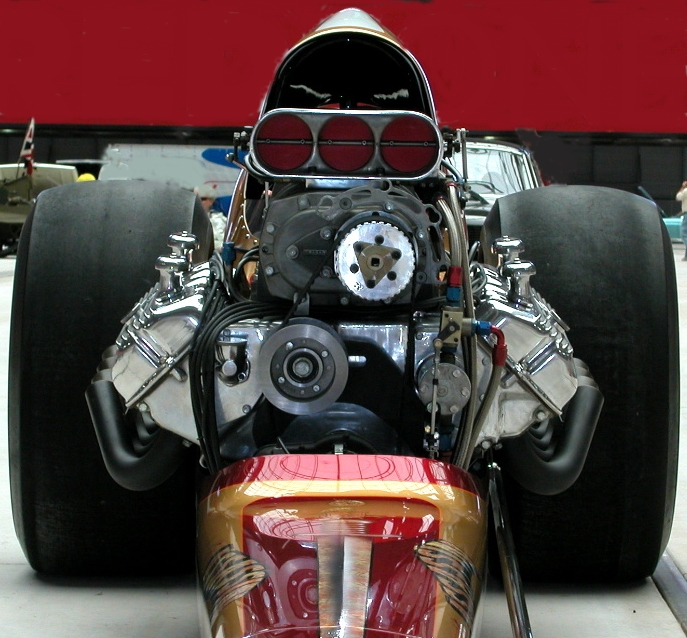
Ford SOHC Hemi (Cammer) front engine rail dragster

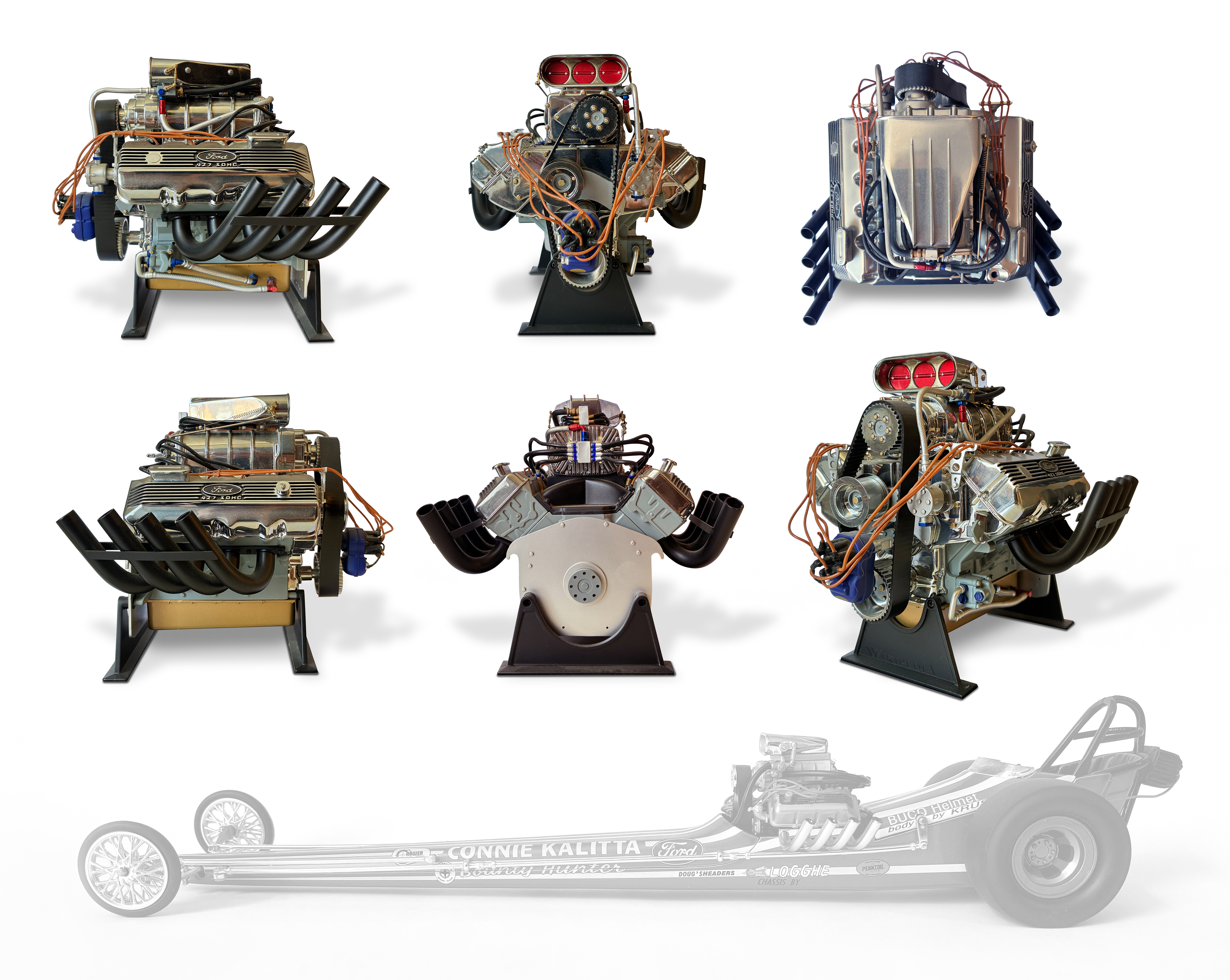
Compilation of views of a Top Fuel engine based on a Ford 427 SOHC V8 with Roots supercharger, as used in front-engine dragsters and funny cars in the 1960s and 70s

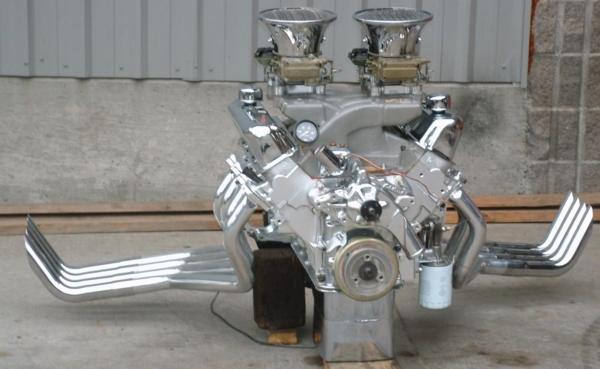
Flopper Funny Car FE

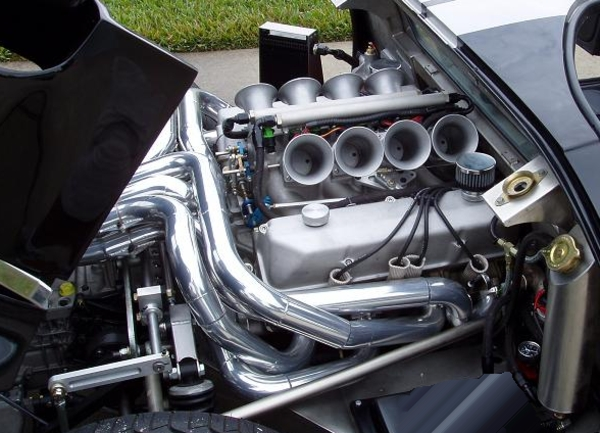
Factory tunnelport crossram fuel injection used in GT40s

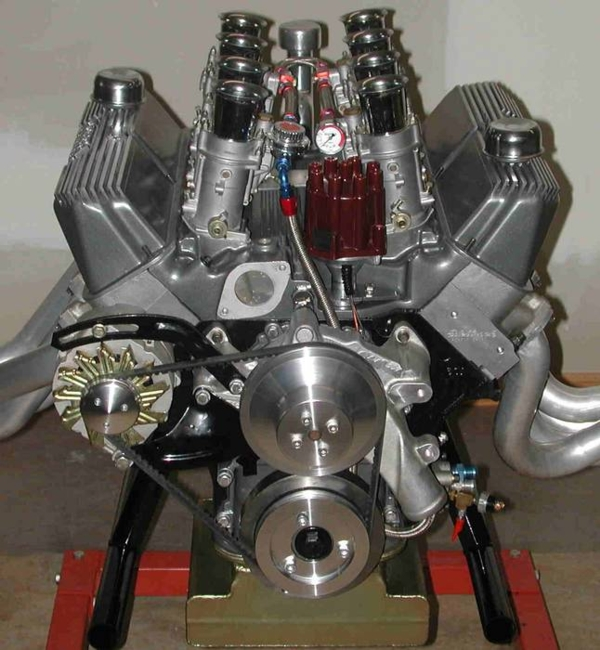
FE with 4 Weber carburetors as installed in competition 427 AC Cobras

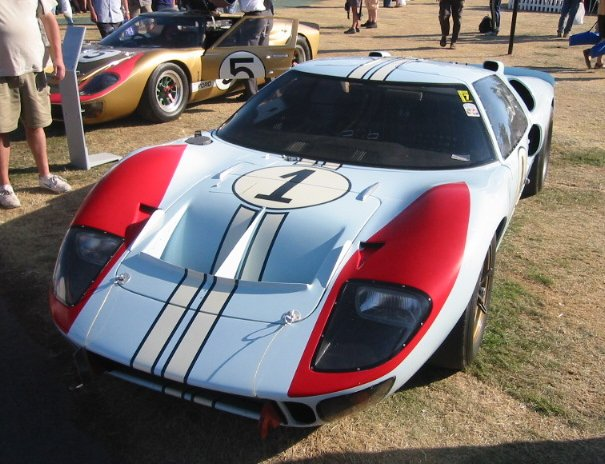
Ford GT40 Mk IIs finished 1-2-3 in the 1966 24 Hours of Le Mans; this car finished 2nd

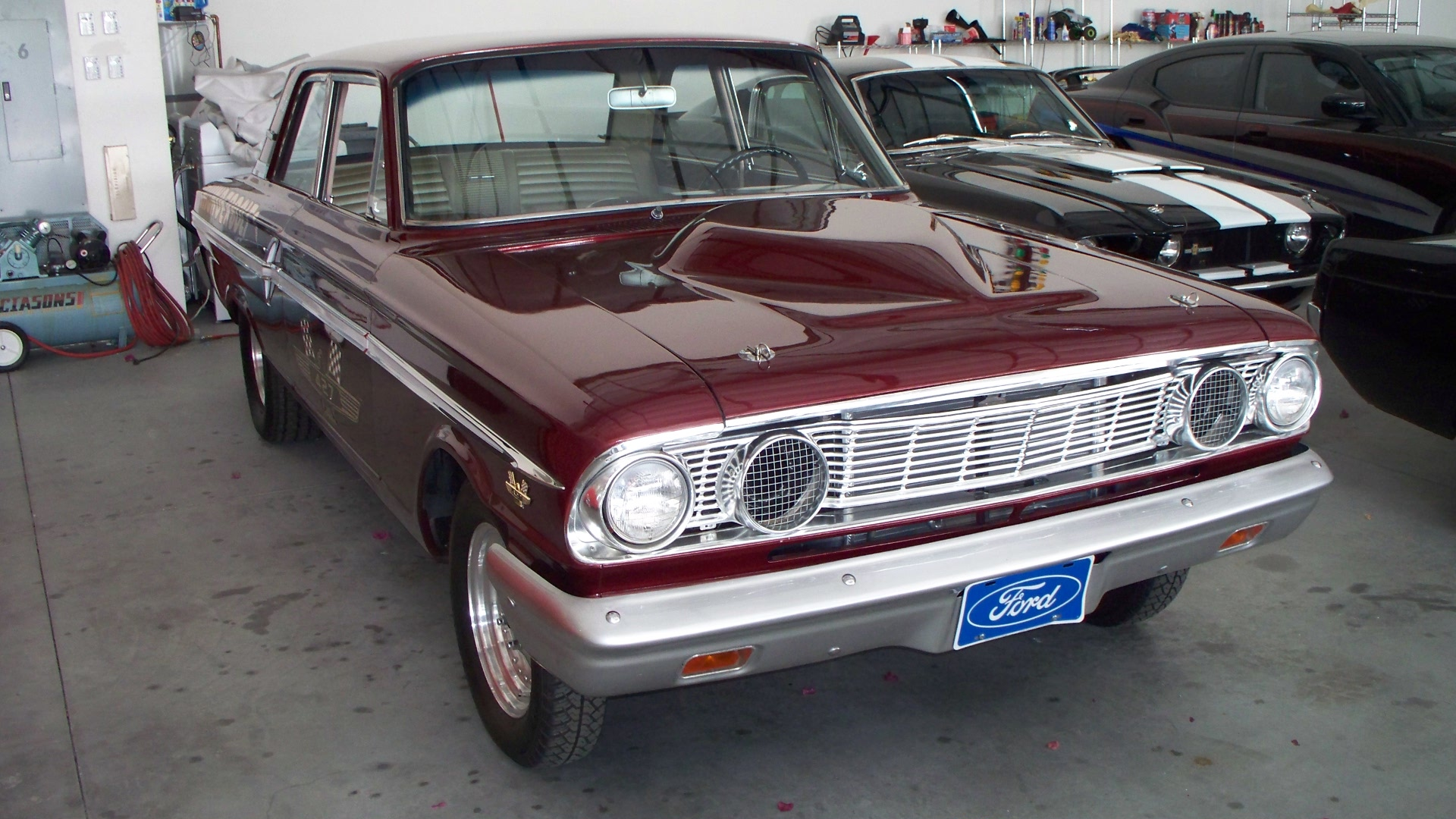
1964 Fairlane Thunderbolt

Specific models that used FE engines include the AC Cobra MKIII, GT40s, the AC 428, as well as various factory racing versions of Ford Mustangs, Ford Galaxies, Ford Fairlanes, and Ford Thunderbirds.

In the 1960s, most organized racing events required either stock components or components that were readily available to the general public. For NASCAR racing, rules required that at least 500 vehicles be sold to the general public equipped as raced. Many drag racing and road racing organizations had similar rules, which contributed to a wide range of performance parts being made available through Ford dealership parts counters. In addition, aftermarket suppliers produced performance parts and accessories.

The use of the FE by Ford itself as the powerplant in many of its racing programs and performance vehicles resulted in constant improvements and engineering changes over the course of its life. Racing-inspired changes to the FE which later made it to production engines included the side-oiler block, which directed oil first to the lower portions of the block.

===== Road and track racing =====
In 1963, the 427 Galaxies dominated NASCAR primarily because in January 1963 G.M. told its divisions to get out of racing. Tiny Lund won the biggest race of the year, the Daytona 500, with 427s finishing first through fifth. Ford won 23 races to Plymouth's 19. The Plymouths earned all their victories on the short tracks while Ford dominated the super speedways, Chevrolet finished with eight wins and Pontiac had four.

In 1964, Ford had their best season ever, with 30 wins. Dodge was second with 14, while Plymouth had 12. Adding the five wins that Mercury had, the 427 had a total of 35 NASCAR Grand National wins for the 1964 season. Fred Lorenzen won the Atlanta 500 and proceeded to beat Dodges and Plymouths, which were using 426 Hemi engines, in six of the next seven races. Ford was using the high-riser intake and matching heads, which were allowed by NASCAR for one season (1964).

In 1965, NASCAR banned Ford's high-riser version of the engine, claiming they did not fit under "stock" hoods. Chrysler's 426 Hemi was banned as well, returning in 1966 after a de-tuned version was installed in a production vehicle that year. For the 1965 season, Ford developed its own version of a hemi-chambered engine, the 427 single overhead cam (SOHC) "Cammer" which used a single chain-driven overhead camshaft per head to operate the valves in its hemi. NASCAR relegated the engine to the fullsize Galaxie. Then Ford developed the medium-riser intake and head, which fit under stock hoods and was accepted by NASCAR. Ned Jarrett, driving for Ford, was the 1965 Grand National champion and Ford won the NASCAR crown.

Also in 1965, Ford and Carroll Shelby began production of a new and improved Cobra using a 427 cubic inches (7 L) FE side-oiler in place of the original's 289 cu in (4.7 L) Windsor small-block. A new chassis was built enlarging 3" main tubing to 4", with coil springs all around. The new car also had wide fenders and a larger radiator opening. The S/C (for semi-competition) "street" engine was rated at 425 bhp (317 kW), which provided a top speed of 164 mph (264 km/h), and the competition version (csx 6000) 485 bhp (362 kW) with a top speed of 185 mph (298 km/h). Cobra Mark III production began on 1 January 1965, and was used for racing into the 1970s. An original S/C sold in 2011 for US$1.5 million, making it one of the most valuable Cobra variants.

In 1966, the 427 cubic inch Ford GT40 Mk II dominated the 24 Hours of Le Mans race, with a one-two-three result.

In 1967, Parnelli Jones, in a Holman-Moody prepped Fairlane, won the season-opening Riverside 500 road race. Then, Mario Andretti captured the Daytona 500 in a Fairlane, with Fred Lorenzen a close second in his Holman-Moody Ford. The FE again powered the 24 Hours of Le Mans winner. In 1968, the rules of the race were changed, limiting displacement to 302 cubic inches under certain circumstances. Ford won the following two years using its Ford Windsor smallblock in the GT40.

Ford's racing partner, privately owned Holman-Moody, also developed a version of the FE for the Can-Am racing series. It used factory-supplied tunnel port heads, a mechanical fuel injection system mounted on a crossram intake manifold, and a revised dry sump oiling system, but met with only limited success.

===== Drag racing =====
Organized drag racing (NHRA, AHRA and even NASCAR dabbled in drag racing in the mid-1960s) was a major venue for the FE in its various forms. Many of the most innovative products were developed and used for 1/4 mile drag racing as aftermarket suppliers eagerly supported the engine design with products such as special intakes, camshafts, superchargers, manifolds, cylinder heads, water and fuel pumps, and exhaust headers. But it was the Ford company itself which developed the most potent products and platforms for the drag-racer. Beginning in 1962 and continuing through 1964, Ford made lightweight versions of its popular Galaxie model using aluminum, fiberglass and specially chosen components emphasizing light weight over comfort or style. Many parts were simply not put on the vehicle, such as a passenger side windshield wiper, sound deadening, armrests, heater, and radio.

In late 1964, Ford contracted Holman & Moody to prepare ten 427-powered Mustangs to contest the National Hot Rod Association's (NHRA) A/Factory Experimental Class in the 1965 drag racing season. Five of these special Mustangs made their competition debut at the 1965 NHRA Winternationals, where they qualified in the Factory Stock FX Eliminator Class for (FX cars only). The car driven by Bill Lawton won the class.

For the 1964 model year, Ford introduced the two-door Fairlane 500 sedan-based Thunderbolt. Modified to accept a 427 high-riser engine, it featured a teardrop-shaped bubble hood to clear the induction system and drivetrain components from the larger Galaxie model. The two inner headlights were eliminated and replaced with air inlets ducted directly to the two four-barrel carbs. It was an industry first, the only time that a turn key drag car was made available to the general public. However, the extensive modifications to the car did not meet Ford appearance quality standards.

THIS VEHICLE HAS BEEN BUILT SPECIALLY AS A LIGHTWEIGHT COMPETITIVE CAR AND INCLUDES CERTAIN FIBERGLASS AND ALUMINUM COMPONENTS. BECAUSE OF THE SPECIALIZED PURPOSE FOR WHICH THIS CAR HAS BEEN BUILT AND IN ORDER TO ACHIEVE MAXIMUM WEIGHT REDUCTION, NORMAL QUALITY STANDARDS OF THE FORD MOTOR COMPANY IN TERMS OF EXTERIOR PANEL FIT AND SURFACE APPEARANCE ARE NOT MET ON THIS VEHICLE.

THIS INFORMATION IS INCLUDED ON THIS VEHICLE TO ASSURE THAT ALL CUSTOMERS WHO PURCHASE THIS CAR ARE AWARE OF THE DEVIATION FROM THE REGULAR HIGH APPEARANCE QUALITY STANDARDS OF THE FORD MOTOR COMPANY.

The 1964 NHRA Super Stock meeting was captured with a Thunderbolt. However, all three NHRA Top Stock Eliminator titles were won by Chrysler's Race Hemi. Nearly half a century later, in 2013, a Thunderbolt set a new SS/A record of 8.55 seconds in the quarter mile, with a closing speed of 154 mph,

In 1963, Dick Brannan set the NHRA Super/Stock National record at 12.42 on a hot July day. In the biggest race of the year, the INDY Nationals, Ed Martin's lightweight Galaxie lost the Super Stock trophy run to John Barker's Dodge but at the teardown, the Dodge was found to have an illegal cam. In drag racing, the 427 Ford Galaxie was a winner in three consecutive National Events: the '64 Indy Nationals, the 1965 WinterNationals and the 1965 Indy Nationals. It was Mike Schmitt driving the Desert Motors Galaxie to the AA/SA Class win at the 1964 Indy Nationals. At the 1965 Winternationals it was a clean sweep as Doug Butler's four-speed took the win in AA/S with a 12.77 at 114.21 and Bill Hanyon won on the automatic side with a 12.24 at 117.95. Additionally, Bud Schellenberger's "Double A Stock" 1964 Galaxie was the 1965 Indy Nationals Top Stock Eliminator with a 12.16 at 114.21. The Shelby Super Snake top fuel dragster, powered by a 427 supercharged SOHC, became the first car in NHRA competition to break the six-second quarter-mile time barrier. It was the winner of the 1966 NHRA Spring Nationals. In every decade since, the FE has held drag-racing records. In 2011, the new decade opens with the NHRA SS/F (class rules include stock compression ratio, stock valve sizes, stock carb sizing and other OEM-type equipment limitations) national record: the quartermile in 9.29 seconds, with a closing speed of 143.63 mph.

===== Other closed course racing =====
In 1970, an FE-powered vehicle set the land speed record for the U.K. Tony Densham set the new British land speed record of just over 207.6 mph (334.1 km/h) over the flying kilometer (the average of two runs in opposite directions within an hour) and then held onto the record for over 30 years. The FE-powered vehicle beat the official British wheel-driven record over the flying 500 and kilometer distances, until then held by Sir Malcolm Campbell, of 174.883 mph

==== Custom automobiles ====
The FE engine is used extensively in custom installations. The extensive availability of multi-carburetor and other exotic intakes, as well as many other "dress-up parts", has contributed to its use where the engine would be shown off. FEs powered the original Batmobiles built by George Barris for the 1966 TV series. It fit under the hood along with the Bat-ray, Bat-ram, a nose-mounted aluminum chain slicer and all the associated support hardware of the 5,500-pound vehicle. One dragstrip version was equipped with a Holman-Moody prepped 427 FE with dual quads, which would be launched in second gear and spin its tires the entire quarter-mile length of the track. In 1968 Carroll Shelby created a custom Mustang using a California Special model and an experimental Ford 428 FE (known as a CJX, precursor to the 428 Cobra Jet). This "Green Hornet" had a custom independent rear suspension, four-wheel disc brakes and a Conelec electronically controlled port fuel injection system. It had a 5.7 sec 0-60 time and 157 mph top speed, versus a factory 428 cu in FE Shelby GT500's 6.5 second 0-60 and 128 mph top speed.

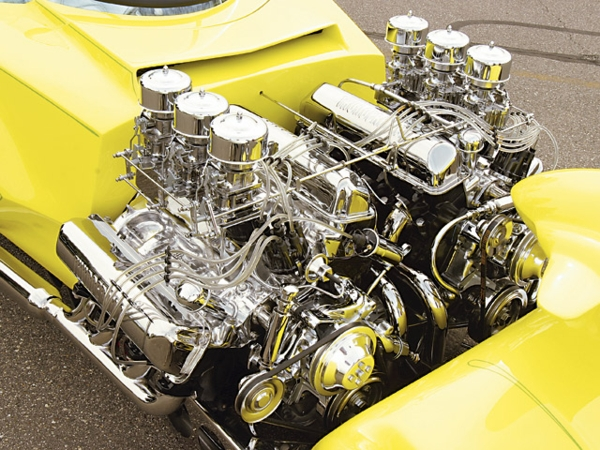
Pair of FEs used in an Ed Roth custom

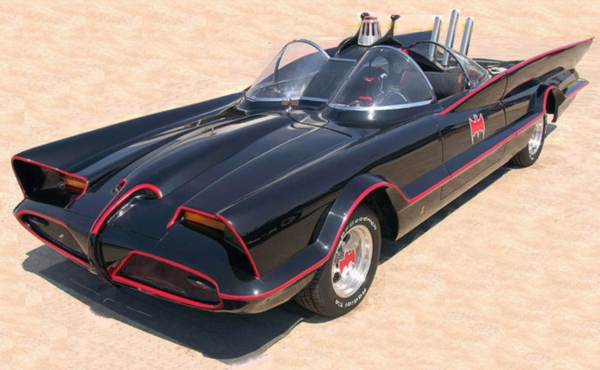
Batmobile

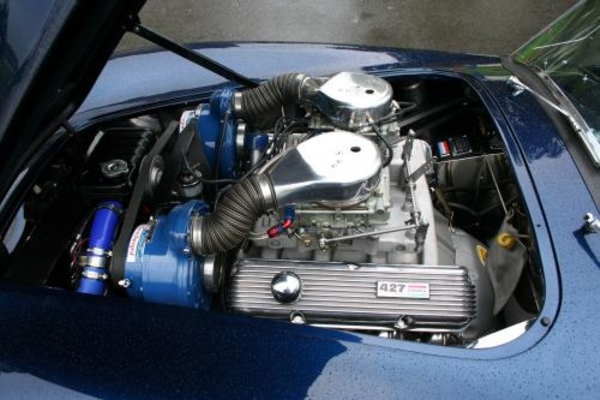
An FE with dual superchargers in a tribute to the 200 mph Cobra made famous by Bill Cosby

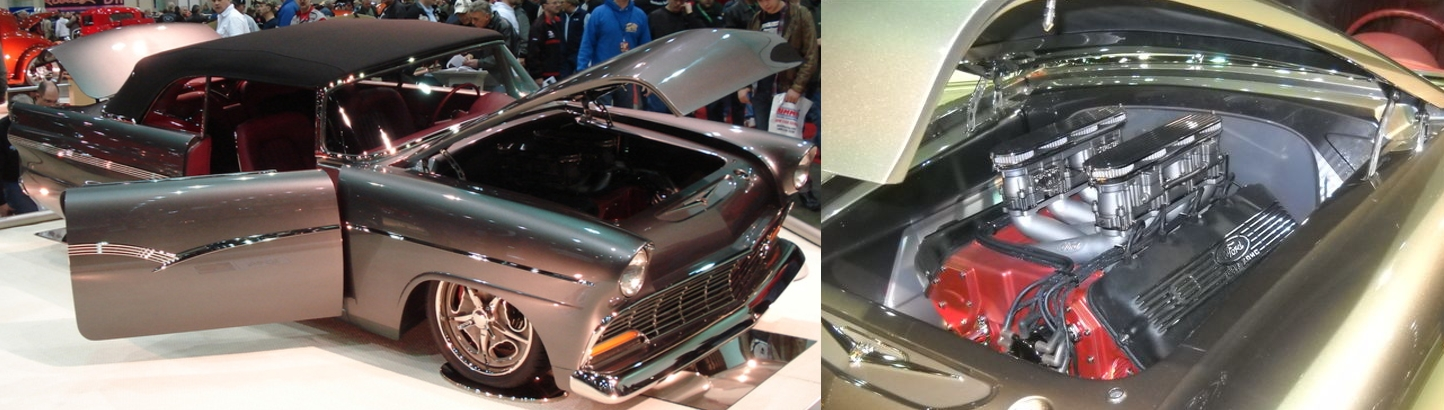
2011 Ridler Award winner – 1956 Ford Sunliner with an FE SOHC (Cammer)

==== Marine applications ====
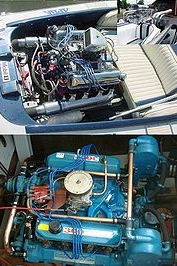
Examples of FEs installed in boats

The FE was popular in V-drive marine applications, available as a factory option in Century boats.

Beginning in 1968, the U.S. Navy SEALS used twin 427 FEs to power their Light SEAL Support Craft (LSSC).

== Replacement ==
By the mid-1970s the FE had been widely used in Ford vehicles for nearly two decades. To replace it, Ford had developed the 335-series engines, commonly referred to as "Cleveland" engines, and the 385-series engines. These were produced in displacements ranging from 351 cu in (5.8 L) up to 460 cu in (7.5 L), including 429 cu in (7.0 L), giving Ford V8s of 427 cu in (7.0 L), 428 cu in (7.0 L), and 429 cu in (7.0 L). The last FE was installed in a production vehicle in 1976, and in the late 1970s the Dearborn Engine Plant that produced the FE engines was completely retooled to produce the 1.6-liter engine introduced in the Ford Escort in 1981.
