= Strike Assault Boat =

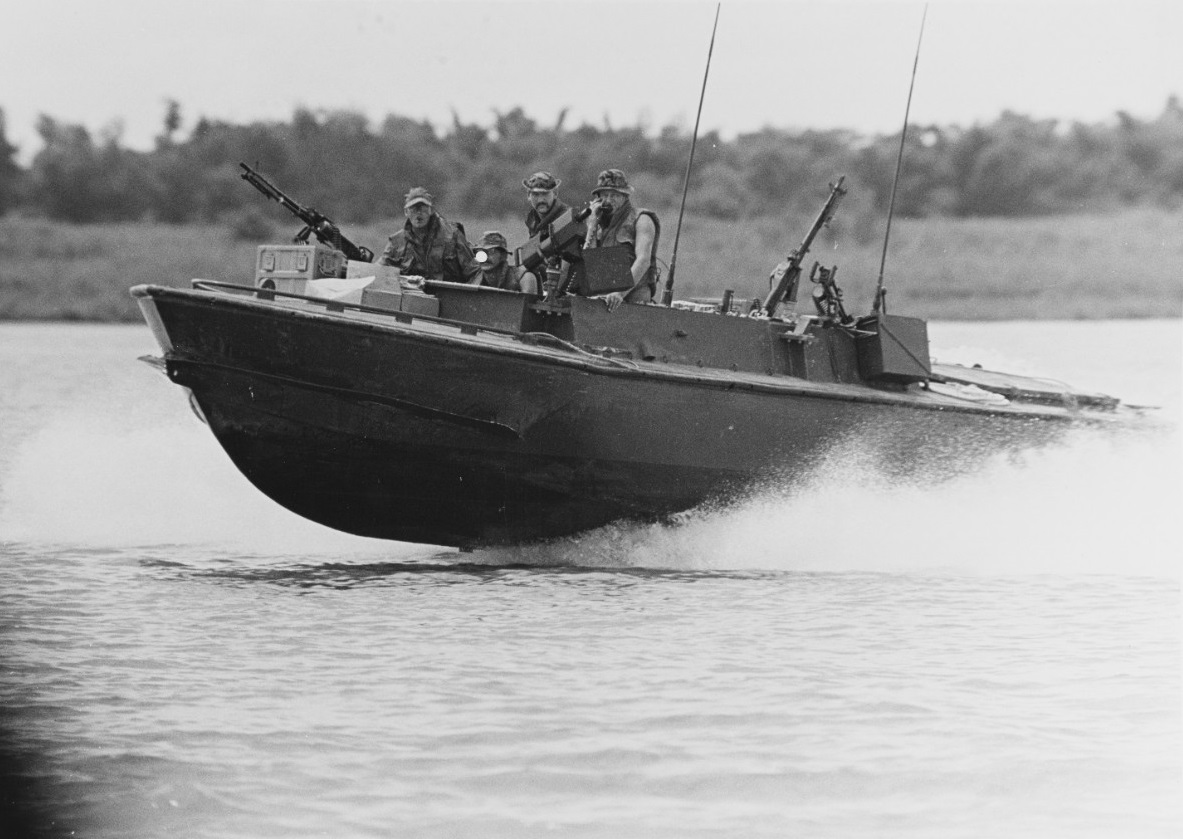
- A STAB makes a high speed patrol near the Cambodian border, 20 June 1970

Class overview
- Name: STAB (Strike Assault Boat)
- Builders: Grafton Boat Works
- Operators: United States Navy
- Completed: 22

General characteristics
- Type: riverine patrol boat
- Length: 7.97 m (26.1 ft)
- Beam: 3.14 m (10.3 ft)
- Draft: 1.14 m (3.7 ft)
- Propulsion: 2 inboard Chevrolet Big Block 427 cubic inch gasoline engines driving 2 × 325hp Mercruiser III stern drives with props
- Speed: 40-45 knots, making it the fastest boat deployed to Vietnam during the war
- Range: 190 nmi
- Complement: 4 Brown Water Navy sailors: Typically, a coxswain, a boat engineer/engineman, a gunner's mate, and a seaman/line handler. A patrol officer was generally assigned to every three or four STAB's on patrol.
- Armament: two/three single M60 machine guns; one/two Mk 20 grenade launcher(s)
- Armor: ceramic armor/woven nylon

The Strike Assault Boat (STAB) (also known as the SEAL Team Assault Boat), was a fast and heavily armed riverine assault boat developed by the United States Navy for use in the Vietnam War in 1970. The mission of the STAB was nighttime Waterborne Guard Post duty (WBGP) and daylight troop/SEAL platoon insertion and extraction operations in the Mekong River and Grand Canal areas of South Vietnam.

== History ==
The STAB was a highly modified version of the Light SEAL Support Craft. In August 1969 Admiral Elmo Zumwalt ordered the establishment of Strike Assault Boat Squadron Twenty (STABRON 20) to serve as a fast reaction force and it was formed at Mare Island Naval Shipyard.

The first shipment of 14 STABs arrived at their operational base, the USS Benewah near An Long on 27 February 1970. Those boats began operating as TE 194.4.5.1 in the western Operation Barrier Reef area on 12 March. Two additional STABs arrived into South Vietnam on 9 March and were transported to the base on USS Benewah. The last four STABs were scheduled to arrive on 20 March. STABRON 20 was assigned to Operation Barrier Reef on the Grand Canal (also known as the La Grange-Ong Long or La Grandière canal), part of Operation Sealords.

On 2 April 1970 at 00:10 a STAB was in a waterborne guard post position near the north bank of the Grand Canal at WS 947 765 (10.642°N 105.865°E) when its crew heard movement on the opposite bank and called in air support. The STAB was then hit by two B-40 rockets killing three crewmembers and wounding a fourth. The STAB pulled away with one engine operational and the surviving crewmen returned fire. An inspection of the STAB found that one B-40 penetrated near the waterline and exploded next to a fuel bladder which self-sealed, while an apparent recoilless rifle hit severed the control cables rendering one engine inoperable.

On 9 May 1970 10 STABS joined the combined U.S. Navy and Republic of Vietnam Navy flotilla that crossed into Cambodia as part of the Cambodian Campaign. U.S. Navy forces patrolled the Mekong River as far as Neak Luong before being withdrawn.

On 7 November 1970 STABRON 20 was redeployed from South Vietnam.
