= Light SEAL Support Craft =

- Navy SEALs board an LSSC in 1968

Class overview
- Name: LSSC (Light SEAL Support Craft)
- Builders: Grafton Boatworks
- Operators: United States Navy
- Completed: 16

General characteristics
- Type: riverine assault boat
- Length: 24 ft (7.3 m)
- Beam: 9.5 ft (2.9 m)
- Draft: 1.5 ft (0.46 m)
- Propulsion: 2 × 350hp Ford FE 427 inboard gasoline engines each driving a Jacuzzi water pump jet
- Speed: 30+ knots
- Complement: 6, generally Navy SEAL team members
- Crew: 3, generally a coxswain, a gunner's mate and an engineman
- Armament: two single M60 machine guns; one M2 Browning
- Armor: ceramic armor/woven nylon

The Light SEAL Support Craft (LSSC), was a fast riverine assault boat developed by the United States Navy for use by the United States Navy SEALs in the Vietnam War in 1968.

== History ==
In July 1968 the LSSC began replacing the Patrol Boat, River as the primary vessel for SEAL team riverine operations.

The LSSC was later developed into the Strike Assault Boat which entered service in 1970.
