= Mk 20 Mod 0 grenade launcher =

Mk 20 Mod 0
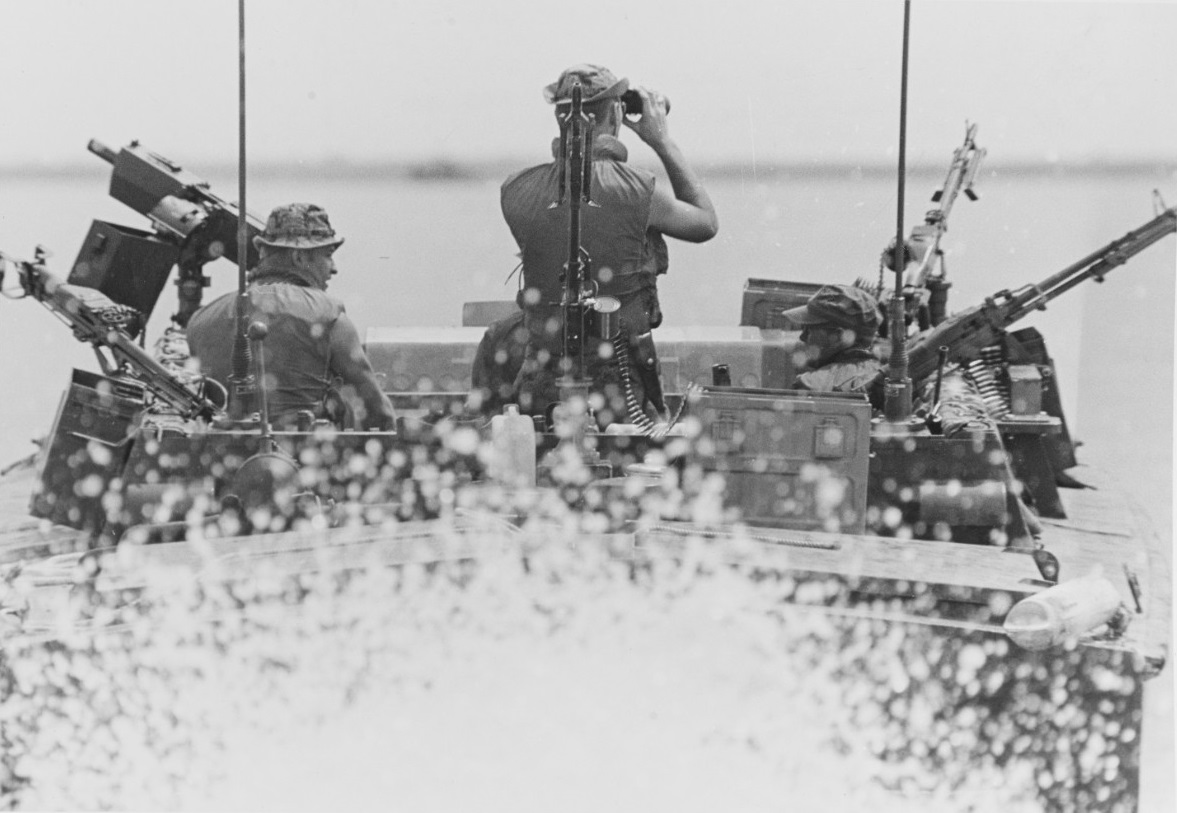
- Mk 20 Mod 0 Grenade Launcher (upper left) on a US Navy Strike Assault Boat
- Type: Automatic grenade launcher
- Place of origin: United States

Service history
- Used by: US Navy; Karen National Union
- Wars: Vietnam War; Internal conflict in Myanmar

Production history
- Manufacturer: NOS Louisville

Specifications
- Mass: 26 pounds
- Length: 27 inches
- Barrel length: 12 inches
- Cartridge: 40x46mm SR
- Caliber: 40mm
- Action: Blow-forward
- Rate of fire: Semi-Automatic; 250-275 RPM Full Automatic
- Muzzle velocity: 250 feet per second
- Effective firing range: 350m
- Maximum firing range: 400m
- Feed system: 24 round belt
- Sights: Iron sights

The Mk 20 Mod 0 was a 40mm automatic grenade launcher manufactured by NOS Louisville which was used by the US Navy during the Vietnam War. The Mk 20 was eventually replaced by the Mk 19 Mod 3.

== Design ==
It used a blow-forward mechanism that was previously used on semi-automatic pistols such as the Steyr Mannlicher M1894 and Schwarzlose Model 1908.

== See also ==
- Mk 18 Mod 0 grenade launcher
