= Ford Country Squire =

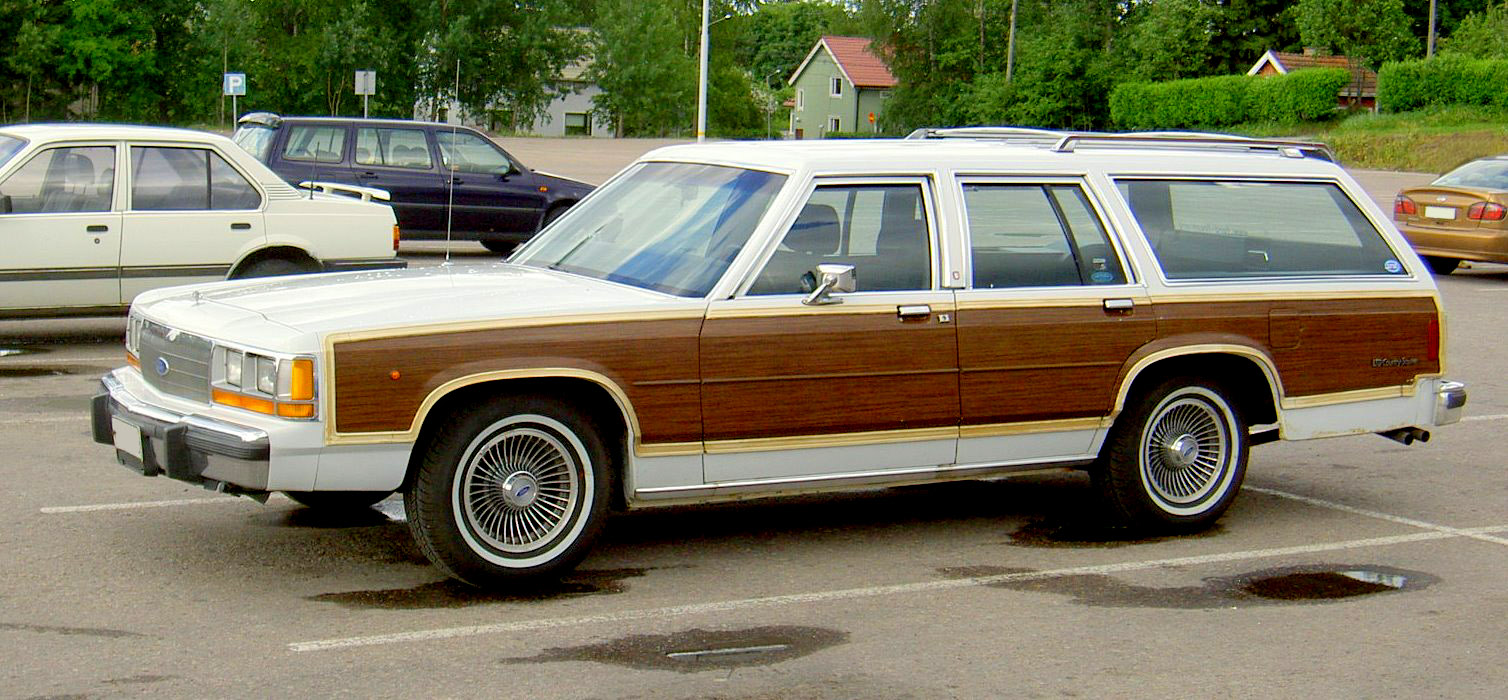
- 1988–1989 Ford LTD Country Squire

Overview
- Manufacturer: Ford
- Model years: 1950–1991

Body and chassis
- Class: Full-size station wagon
- Body style: 2-door station wagon 4-door station wagon
- Related: Mercury Colony Park; Ford Country Sedan; Ford Ranch Wagon

Chronology
- Predecessor: 1948 Ford station wagon

The Ford Country Squire is a series of full-size station wagons that were assembled by American automaker Ford. Positioned as the top-level station wagon of the Ford division, the Country Squire was distinguished by woodgrain bodyside trim. From 1950 through the 1991 model years, eight generations of the Country Squire were produced. Following the discontinuation of the Edsel Bermuda, Mercury marketed the Mercury Colony Park as a divisional counterpart of the Country Squire, sharing bodywork and trim, while the Mercury was not available with a six-cylinder engine and was more expensive due to the optional equipment on the Ford that was standard on the Mercury.

As part of the full-size Ford model range, the Country Squire was the top trim package station wagon counterpart of several model lines. For its first two generations, the Country Squire was based upon the Ford Custom Deluxe and the Ford Crestline that replaced it, along with the more modestly equipped Ford Country Sedan, which was identical in dimensions except for the woodgrain appearance and minimal standard equipment. For its next three generations, the Country Squire was a distinct model range, initially sharing its trim with the Ford Fairlane. The Country Squire later adopted trim of the Ford Galaxie. For its final two generations, the Country Squire became a counterpart of Ford LTD and the Ford LTD Crown Victoria after its downsizing for the last generation, while sharing multiple passenger accommodation duties with the Ford Aerostar.

The Country Squire was discontinued as part of the development of the 1992 Ford Crown Victoria and passenger carrying duties were given to the Ford Windstar. The decline in full-size station wagon sales meant the Crown Victoria was exclusively a four-door sedan. The 41-year production run of the Country Squire is the third-longest of a Ford car nameplate in North America, surpassed only by the Ford Thunderbird and Ford Mustang, which is to date still in production.

The term squire is a British term that refers to a village leader or a lord of the manor, which is also called a "squire", and the term was applied to members of the landed gentry.

== Woodgrain trim ==
Although all Ford Country Squires feature wood-grain body trim, only the first-generation 1950-1951 versions are true "woodies". The genuine wood body panels were manufactured at the Ford Iron Mountain Plant in the Michigan Upper Peninsula from lumber owned by Ford Motor Company. For 1952, all-steel bodies replaced wooden body structures to reduce production costs. Subsequently, exterior body trim consisted of simulated woodgrain (with varying degrees of coverage on the body).

During the 1960s, 1970s, and early 1980s, Ford would use the Squire nameplate on intermediate, mid-size, compact, and subcompact vehicles, denoting station wagons with woodgrain exterior trim. Alongside full-size Fords, the Squire name was used for the Falcon, Fairlane, Torino, Pinto, Granada, Gran Torino, LTD II, Fairmont, Escort, and mid-size LTD (the last model range to use the name). The Squire name was also used on woodgrain-trim versions of the Ranchero; in 1976, Ford offered a Pinto Squire two-door hatchback.

== First generation (1950–1951) ==
First generation
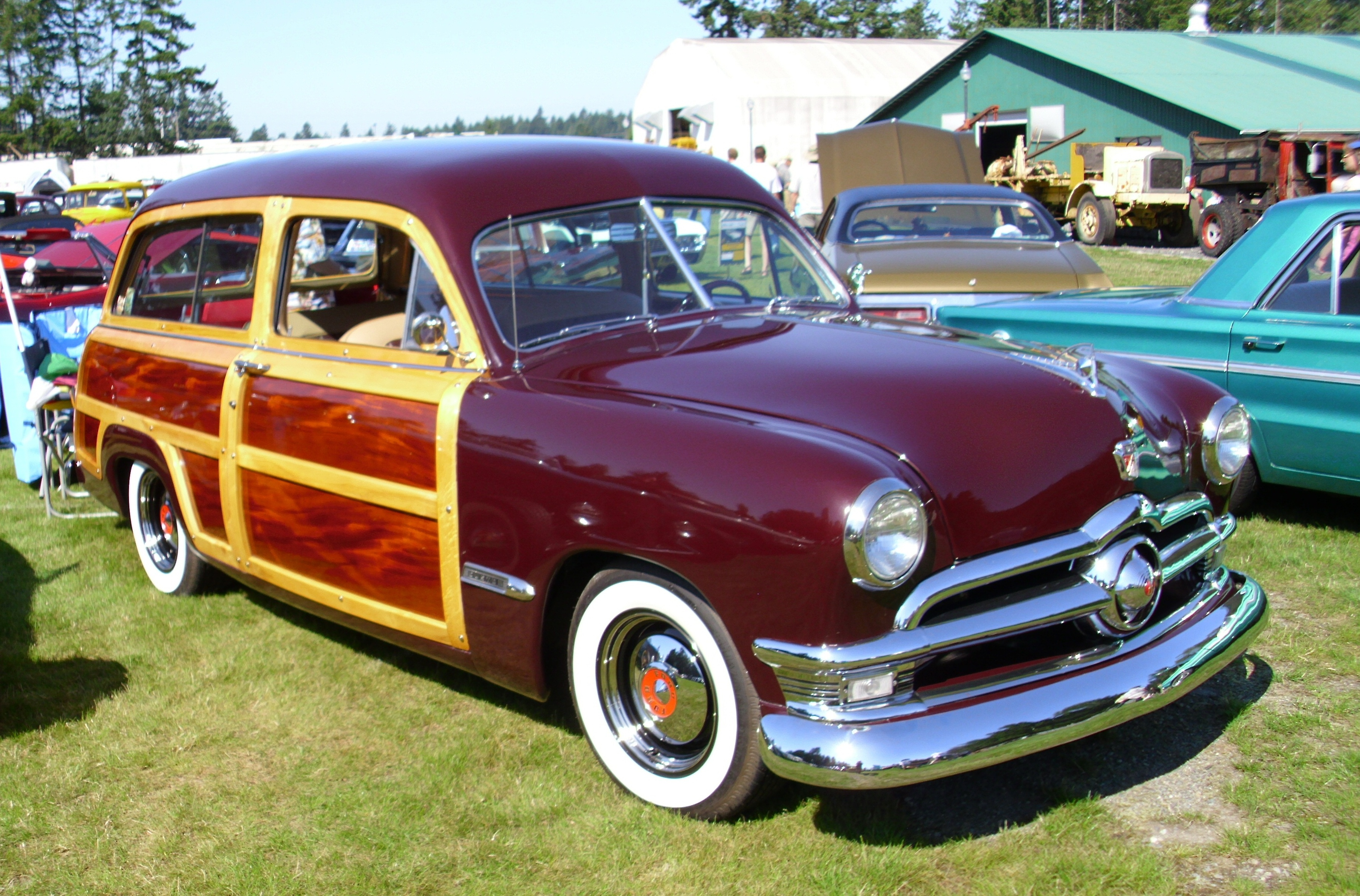
- 1950 Ford Custom DeLuxe Country Squire

Overview
- Also called: Ford Custom (1949); Ford Custom Deluxe (early 1950)
- Production: 1950–1951
- Assembly: United States: Main plant; Dearborn, MI; Branch Assembly; Twin Cities, MN; Somerville, MA; Richmond, CA; Norfolk, VA; Memphis, TN; Louisville, KY; Long Beach, CA; Kansas City, MO; Edgewater, NJ; Dallas, TX; Chicago, IL; Chester, PA; Buffalo, NY; Atlanta, GA; Iron Mountain, Michigan (Ford Iron Mountain Plant)
- Designer: Eugene Gregorie, Ross Cousins (1944)

Body and chassis
- Body style: 2-door station wagon
- Platform: 1949 Ford
- Chassis: body-on-frame
- Related: Mercury Eight

Powertrain
- Engine: 226 cu in (3.7 L) Flathead I6; 239 cu in (3.9 L) Flathead V8
- Transmission: 3-speed manual 4-speed manual 3-speed Ford-O-Matic automatic

Dimensions
- Wheelbase: 114 in (2,896 mm)
- Length: 208.0 in (5,283.2 mm)
- Width: 71.7 in (1,821.2 mm)

For the 1949 model year, Ford introduced its first post-war model line. While retaining body-on-frame construction, the 1949 Ford chassis abandoned several design elements retained by Ford since the Model T, including a torque tube driveshaft and transverse leaf springs. In a major change, Ford sought to change the marketing of station wagons, transitioning their use from a commercial vehicle to a premium family vehicle. The listed retail price was US$2,119 ($28,673 in 2025 dollars) and 31,412 were manufactured.

Designed by Eugene Gregorie and Ross Cousins, the Ford station wagon marked the first transition away from the full "woodie". In place of a complete wooden body aft of the firewall, the 1949 Ford station wagon was designed with a steel roof, rear fenders, and tailgate frame. Wood construction remained for the side bodywork and upper and lower tailgate (using mahogany plywood trimmed by maple or birch). Sharing its body with Mercury, the Ford station wagon was offered in Custom trim. To reduce noise and improve sealing, the station wagon was offered with two doors instead of four; however, three seats were used, allowing eight-passenger seating.

For the 1950 model year, Ford renamed its model lines; initially, the station wagon was a Custom Deluxe with the all new "Country Squire" name introduced in early 1950. Several revisions were made for 1950 to improve functionality and capability. The second and third-row seats were redesigned, allowing their removal without tools. In another change, the Country Squire also received heavier-duty rear-suspension, wider tires, and a larger fuel tank over Ford sedans.

Following its introduction, the Country Squire underwent several revisions distinct from Ford sedans. For 1950, the spare-tire cover was deleted; in April 1950, the lower tailgate was redesigned, changing from all-wood construction to steel construction (with wood trim). For 1951, the Country Squire retained the dashboard of the 1950 Ford (with the 1951 steering column).

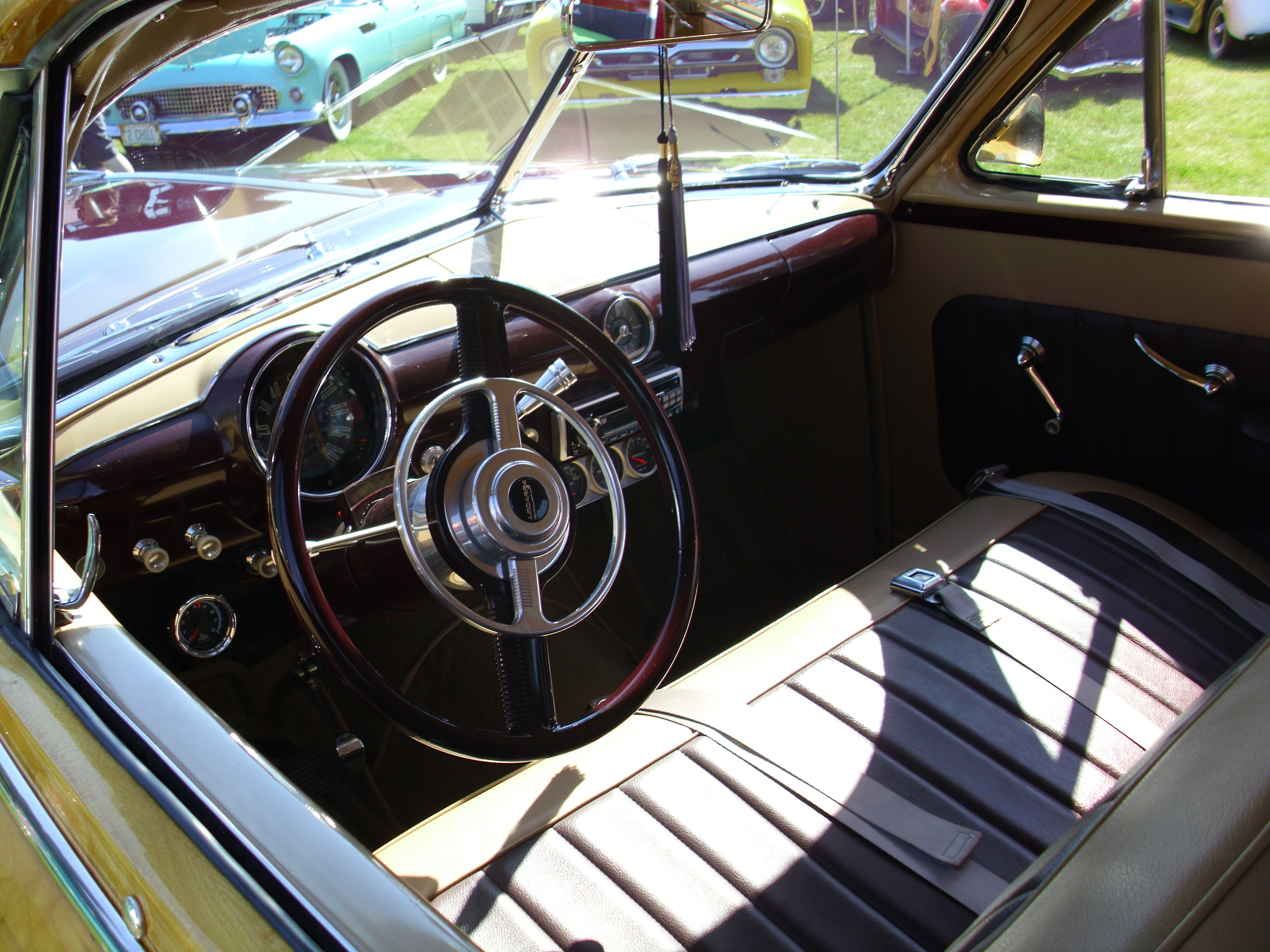
1950 Ford Custom DeLuxe Country Squire interior

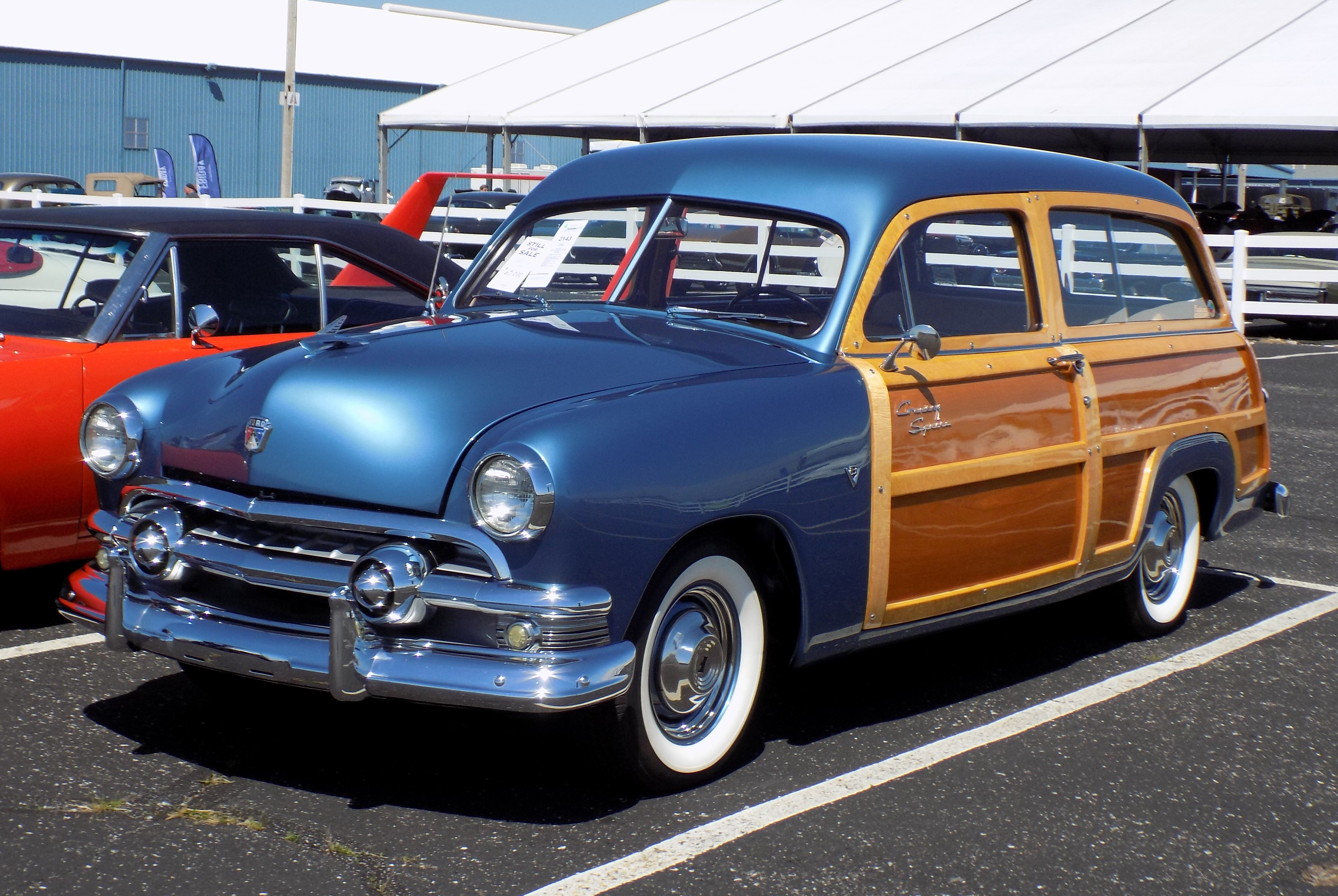
1951 Ford Custom DeLuxe Country Squire

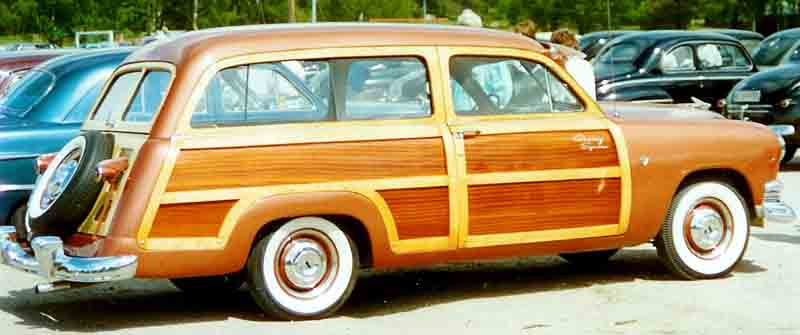
1951 Ford Custom DeLuxe Country Squire

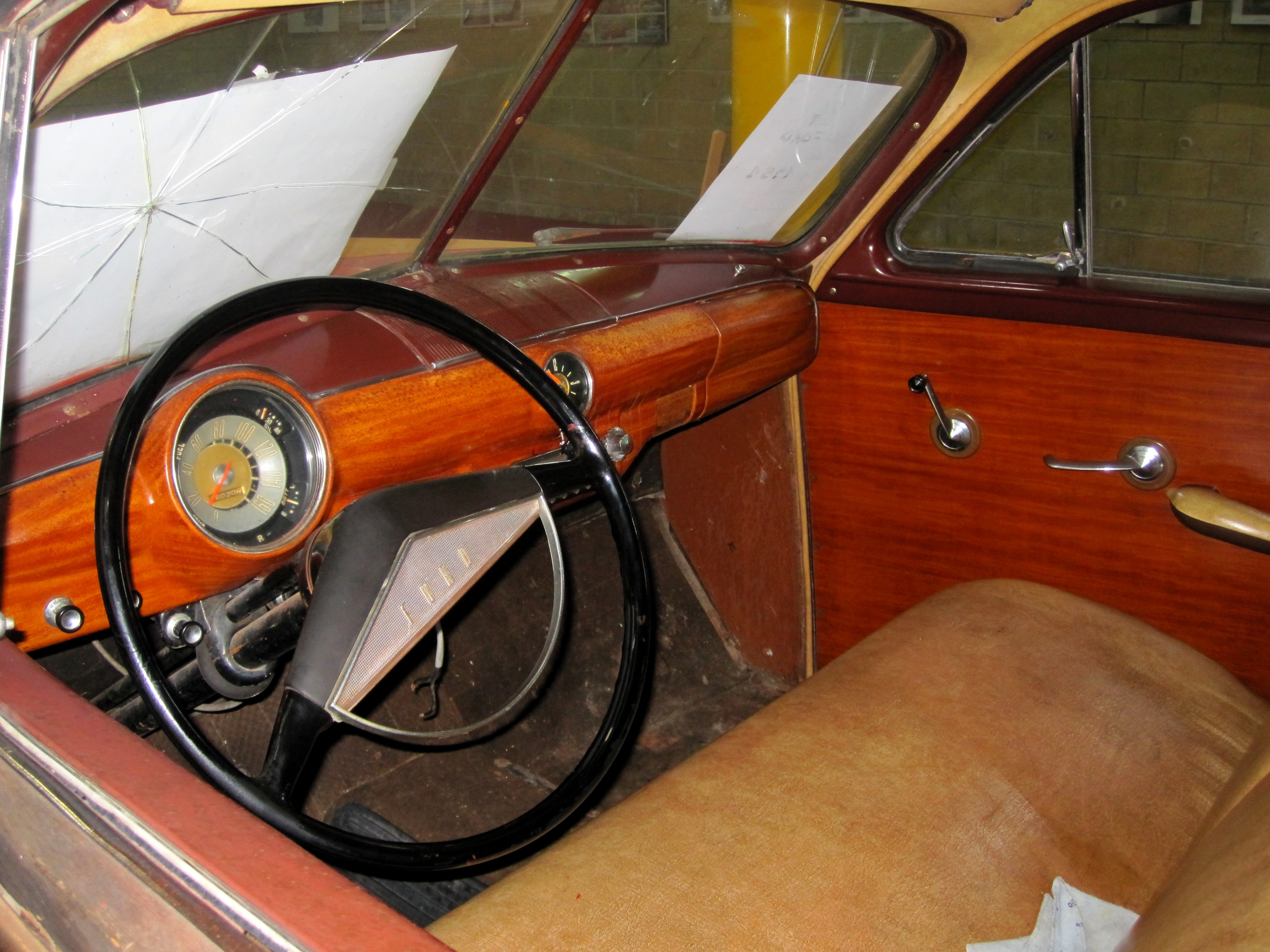
1951 Ford Custom DeLuxe Country Squire interior

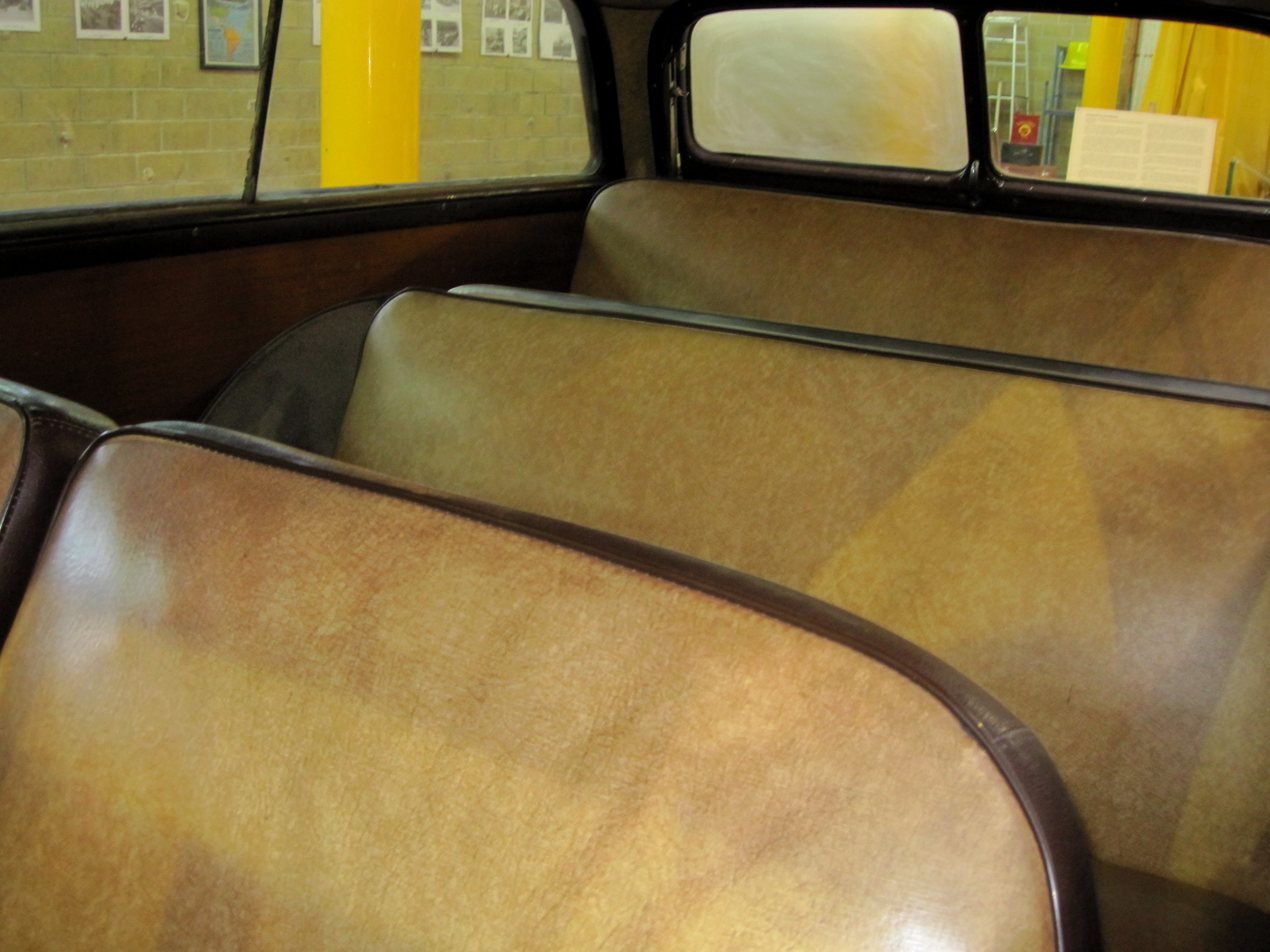
1951 Ford Custom DeLuxe Country Squire interior, front and rear seats

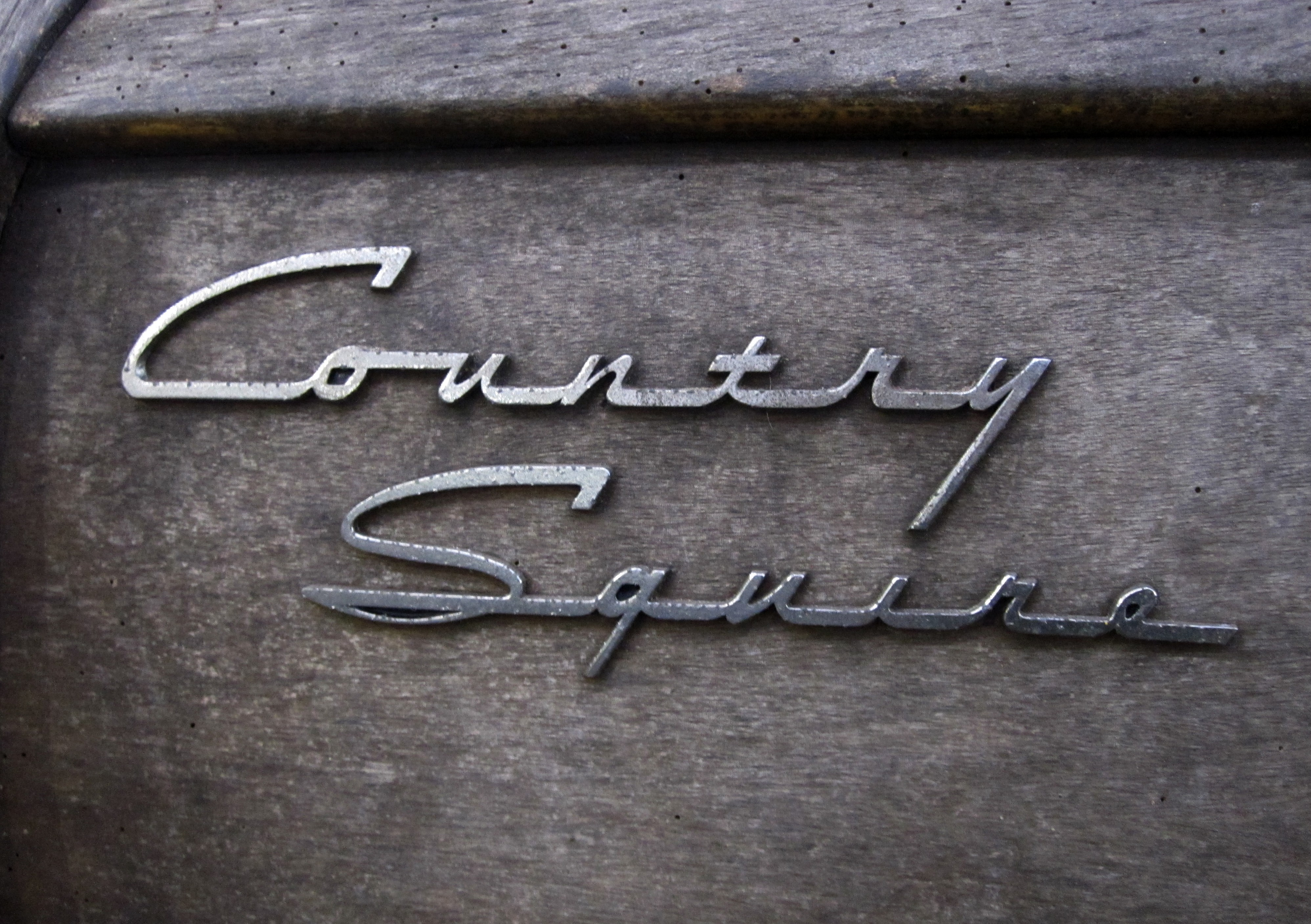
Ford Custom DeLuxe Country Squire emblem

=== Assembly ===
As a true "woodie", assembly of the Country Squire was labor-intensive, requiring completion at three assembly plants. Initial assembly of the steel body was completed at the Dearborn Assembly Plant, with the incomplete body shipped to the Iron Mountain plant for the fitment of wood paneling; upon completion, the bodies were shipped back to various Ford assembly facilities for final assembly (mounting to frames, fitment of interiors).

For 1951, Ford outsourced final assembly of the Country Squire, contracting Ionia Body Company (an assembler of wood-bodied station wagons for General Motors).

=== Powertrain ===
During its production, the first-generation Country Squire was available with engines shared with Ford sedans. The standard engine was a 226 cubic-inch 95 hp H-series inline-6, with a 239 cubic-inch 100 hp Flathead V8. For 1950, a 3-speed manual was standard, with a 3-speed Ford-O-Matic automatic becoming an option in 1951.

=== Sales ===
First-generation Country Squire production
| Year | Sales |
|---|---|
| 1949 (as Custom) | 31,412 |
| 1950 | 22,929 |
| 1951 | 29,017 |

== Second generation (1952–1954) ==
Second generation
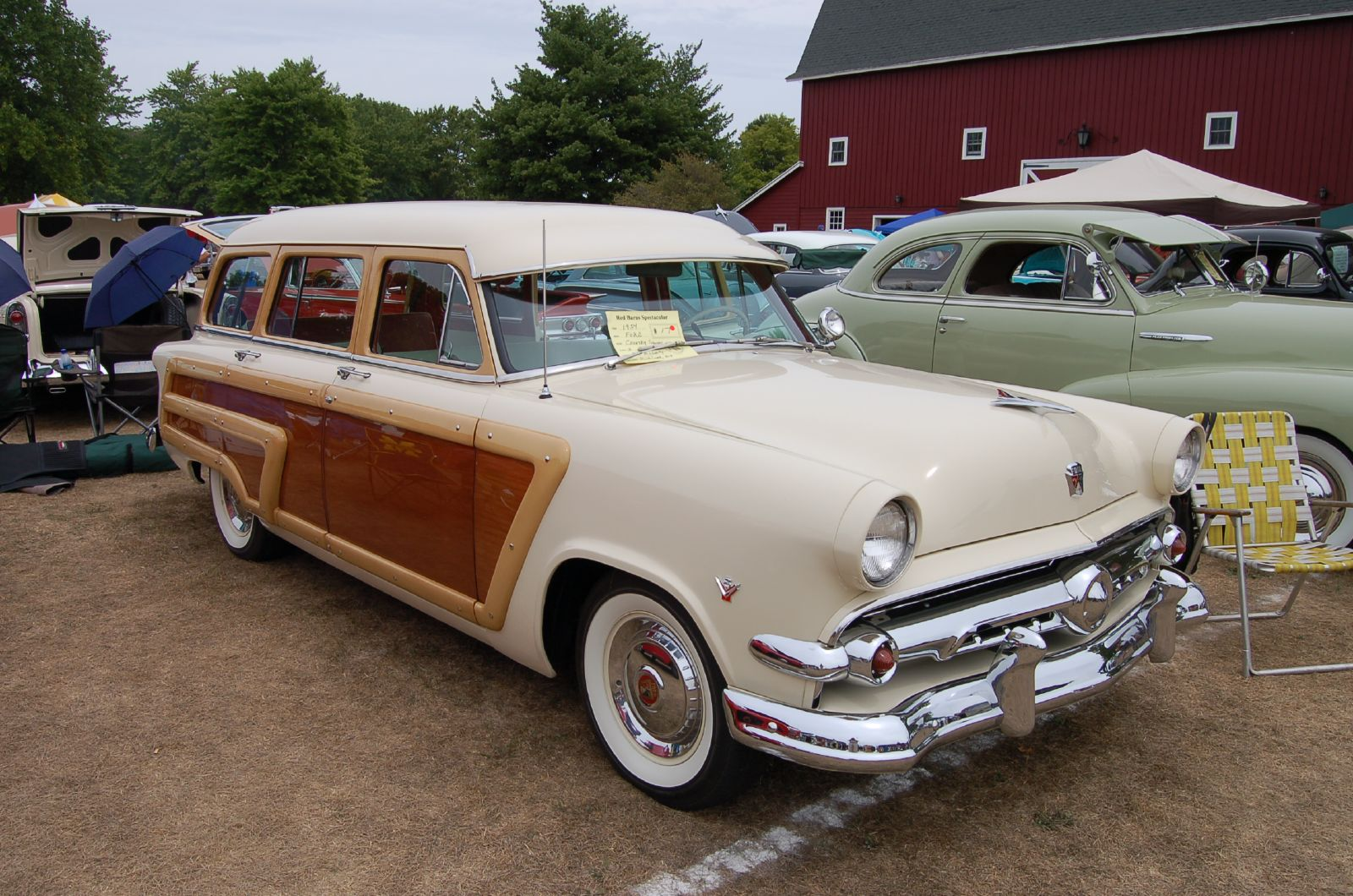
- 1954 Ford Crestline Country Squire

Overview
- Production: 1952–1954
- Assembly: United States: Main plant; Dearborn, MI; Branch Assembly; Twin Cities, MN; Somerville, MA; Richmond, CA; Norfolk, VA; Memphis, TN; Louisville, KY; Long Beach, CA; Kansas City, MO; Edgewater, NJ; Dallas, TX; Chicago, IL; Chester, PA; Buffalo, NY; Atlanta, GA

Body and chassis
- Body style: 4-door station wagon
- Platform: 1952 Ford
- Chassis: body-on-frame
- Related: Ford Crestline; Ford Country Sedan; Mercury Monterey station wagon

Powertrain
- Engine: 223 cu in (3.7 L) Mileage Maker I6; 239 cu in (3.9 L) Flathead V8; 239 cu in (3.9 L) Y-block V8
- Transmission: 3-speed manual 4-speed manual 3-speed Ford-O-Matic automatic

Dimensions
- Wheelbase: 115 in (2,921 mm); 115.5 in (2,934 mm) (1954)
- Length: 197.8 in (5,024.1 mm)
- Width: 73.9 in (1,877.1 mm)
- Height: 63.9 in (1,623.1 mm)

Following a redesign of the Ford model line for the 1952 model year, the second generation of the Country Squire was introduced, marking several major changes to the model line. While sharing much of its body (though not its wheelbase) with the newly introduced Mercury Monterey, only the Country Squire featured wood paneling as standard. In a wider revision for 1952, Ford introduced station wagon counterparts for each of its sedan lines; the Country Squire was the equivalent of the Crestline sedan. Slotted below the Country Squire were the four-door Country Sedan (Customline) and the two-door Ranch Wagon (Mainline).

=== Model overview ===
Designed by Gordon Buehrig, the second-generation Country Squire was developed under a goal to maximize parts commonality between sedan and station wagon model lines. While gaining an inch in wheelbase, the second-generation Country Squire was reduced approximately 10 inches in length over its predecessor while adding two more doors for rear passengers.

In contrast to the Country Sedan, two-tone paint was not offered for the Country Squire; and the only exterior colors offered were Alpine Blue, Carnival Red metallic, Meadowbrook Green, Sungate Ivory and Glenmist Green, and they were color-keyed to the wood exterior trim. Matching the wood trim, the interior was offered in a single tan/brown color scheme. As with the previous generation, the second-generation Country Squire used a two-piece tailgate. The spare tire was relocated under the load floor, with the upper half of the tailgate opened by counterbalanced hinges. The listed retail price was US$2,384 ($28,904 in 2025 dollars) and production numbers dropped significantly with the introduction of the all steel bodied Country Sedan and the more upscale Mercury Monterey wood-bodied station wagon, having only built 5,426.

Over its production, the second generation received several minor revisions. For 1953 (marking the 50th anniversary of Ford), the Country Squire featured a commemorative steering wheel center and rear-door armrests became standard. For 1954, the range of color choices were expanded from six to twelve (remaining single-color exteriors), with red, blue/white, or green/white interiors replacing the previous tan/brown interior. Several power-assisted features became introduced; in 1953, power steering became an option, with power brakes and a power-adjusted front seat introduced for 1954.

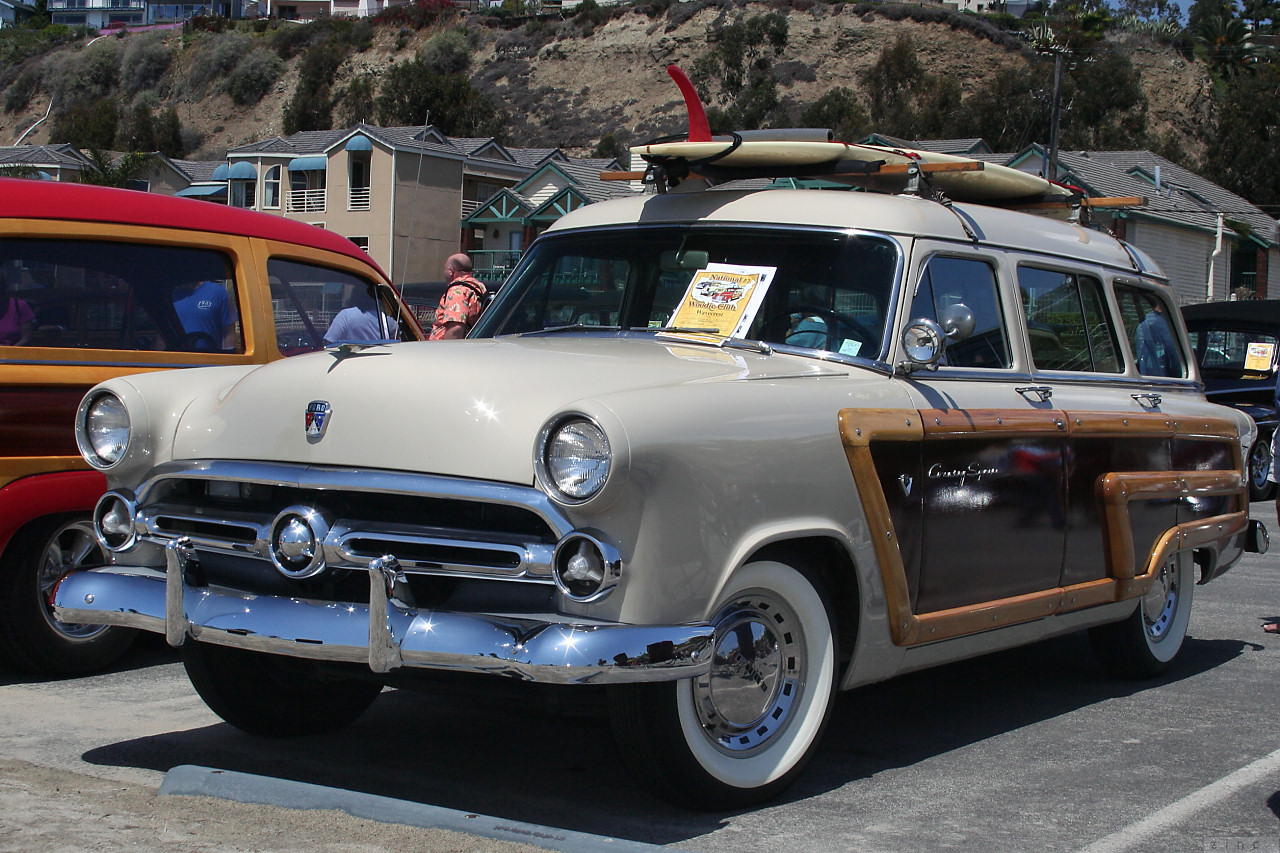
1952 Ford Crestline Country Squire

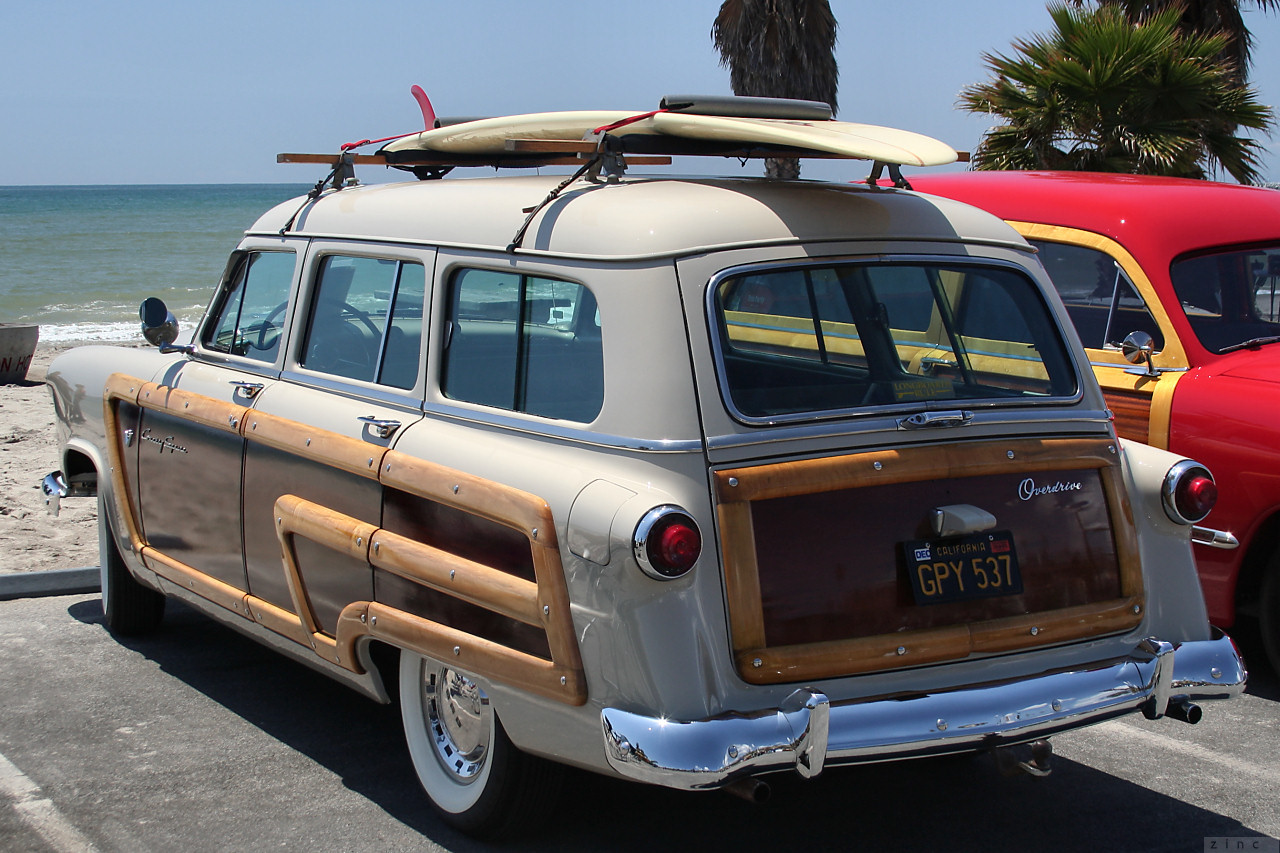
1952 Ford Crestline Country Squire, rear view

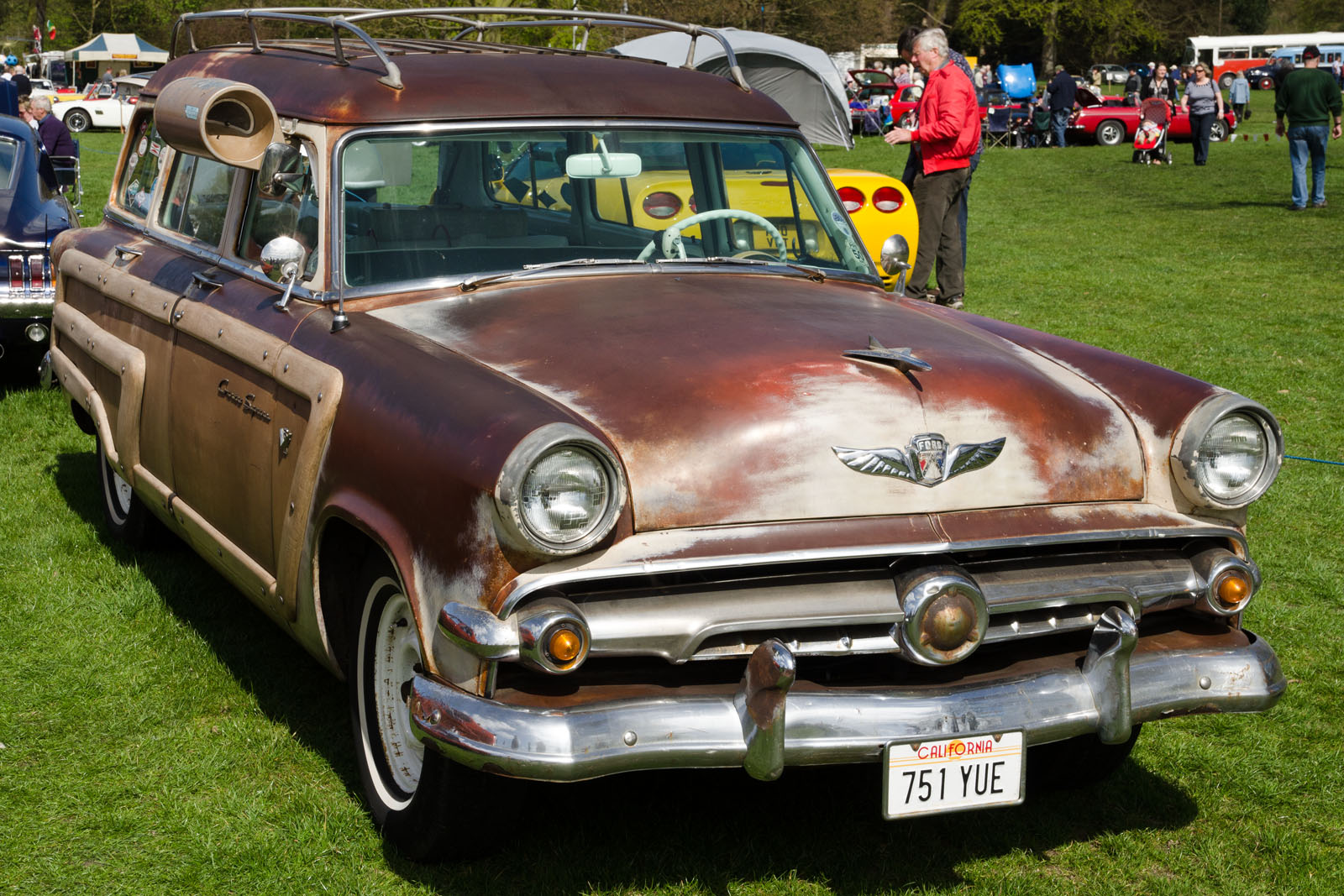
1954 Ford Crestline Country Squire (unrestored)

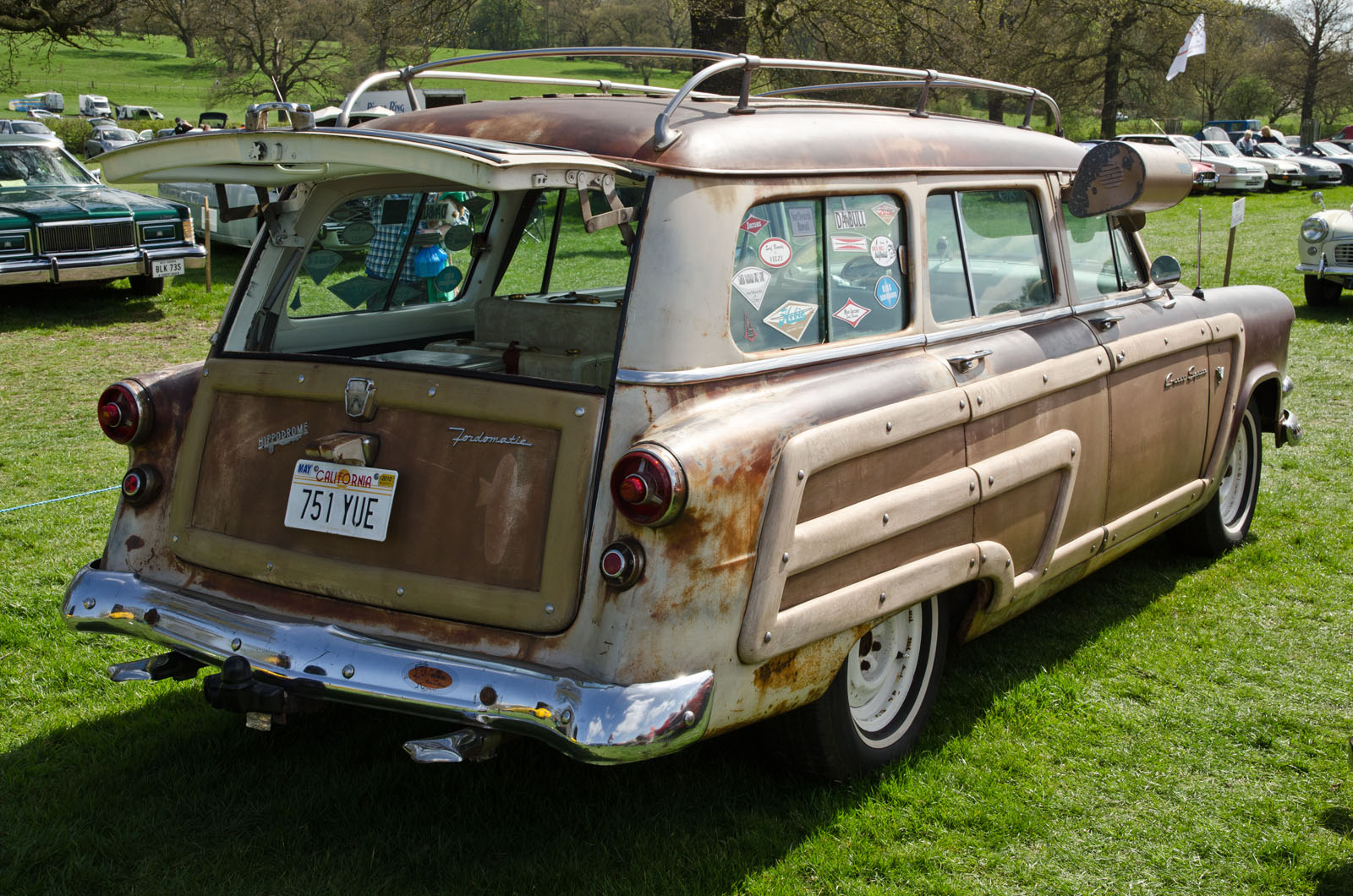
1954 Ford Crestline Country Squire, rear view (unrestored)

==== Powertrain ====
For the 1952 and 1953 model years, the Country Squire was offered with a 110 hp 239 cubic-inch V8 (inline-sixes were offered only for the Ranch Wagon). For 1954, in line with all Fords, the Flathead V8 was replaced by the overhead-valve Y-block V8. While built with the same displacement as the Flathead V8, the Y-block increased output from 110 to 130 hp (82 to 97 kW; 112 to 132 PS). The inline-six was redesigned, with a 223 cu in (3.7 L) version becoming the standard engine, producing 115 hp (86 kW; 117 PS).

=== Assembly changes ===
Marketed as premium vehicles, wood-bodied station wagons were labor-intensive to assemble (and maintain). To reduce assembly and ownership costs, the Country Squire abandoned wood-paneled construction for a full-steel body. To distinguish itself from the Country Sedan, DI-NOC (vinyl transfers) was used to simulate the mahogany paneling, accented by birch or maple. To further simulate the "woodie" look, woodgrain transfers were applied to the window frames and upper liftgate. For 1954, the wood trim was replaced by fiberglass, colored with a woodgrain finish.

=== Sales ===
Second-generation Country Squire production
| Year | Sales |
|---|---|
| 1952 | 5,426 |
| 1953 | 11,001 |
| 1954 | 12,797 |

== Third generation (1955–1956) ==
Third generation
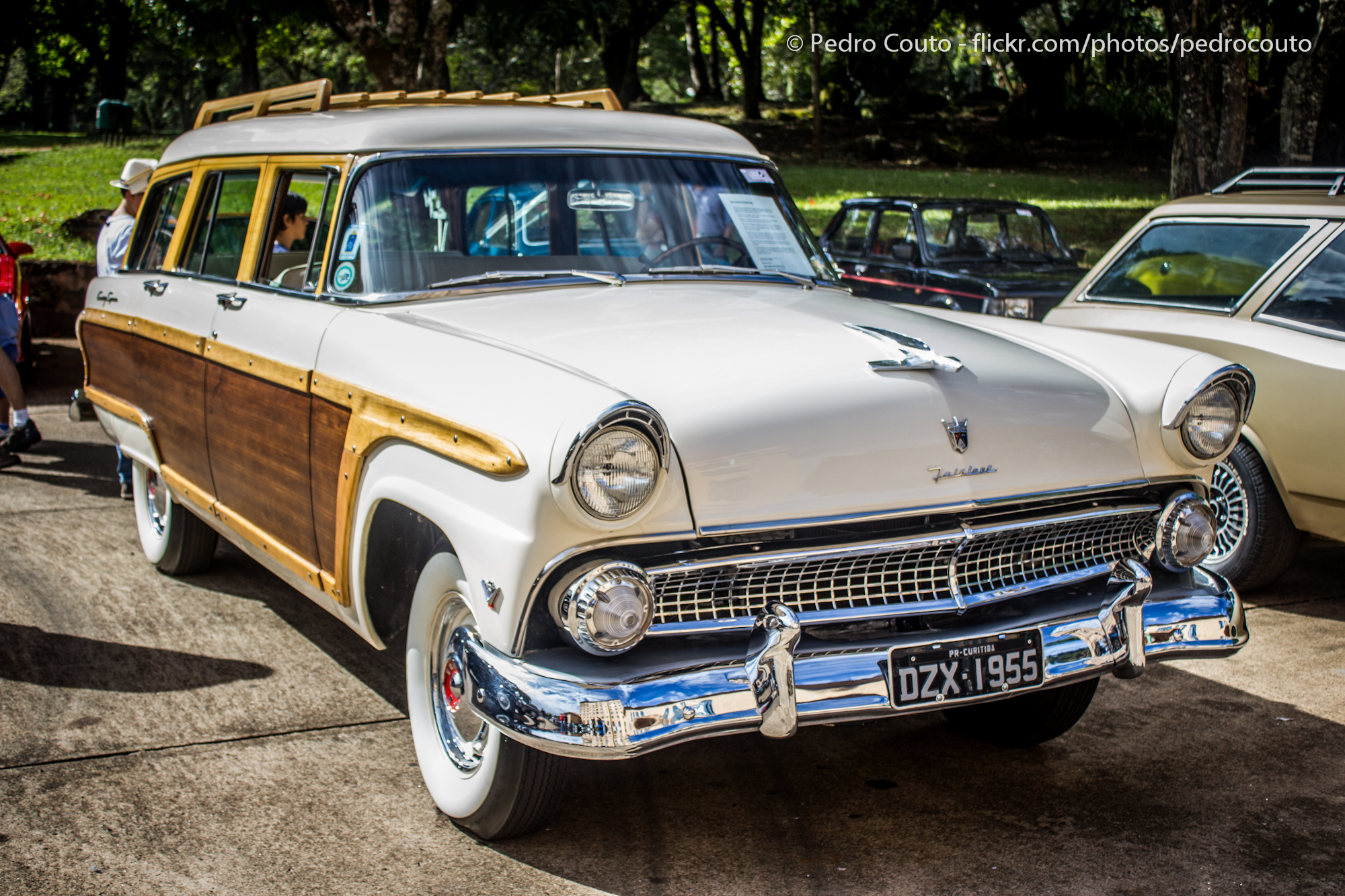
- 1955 Ford Fairlane Country Squire

Overview
- Production: 1955–1956
- Assembly: United States: Main plant; Dearborn, MI; Branch Assembly; Twin Cities, MN; Somerville, MA; Richmond, CA; Norfolk, VA; Memphis, TN; Louisville, KY; Long Beach, CA; Kansas City, MO; Edgewater, NJ; Dallas, TX; Chicago, IL; Chester, PA; Buffalo, NY; Atlanta, GA

Body and chassis
- Body style: 4-door station wagon
- Platform: 1955 Ford
- Chassis: body-on-frame
- Related: Ford Fairlane; Ford Country Sedan; Mercury Monterey station wagon

Powertrain
- Engine: 223 cu in (3.7 L) Mileage Maker I6; 272 cu in (4.5 L) Y-block V8; 292 cu in (4.8 L) Thunderbird V8; 312 cu in (5.1 L) Thunderbird Interceptor V8
- Transmission: 3-speed manual 4-speed manual 3-speed Ford-O-Matic automatic

Dimensions
- Wheelbase: 115.5 in (2,930 mm)
- Length: 197.6 in (5,019.0 mm)
- Width: 75.9 in (1,927.9 mm)
- Height: 62.2 in (1,579.9 mm)

For the 1955 model year, the third generation of the Country Squire was introduced. Functionally an update of the second generation, the body underwent several styling revisions, along with multiple functional upgrades. The Crestline was discontinued, with the Country Squire becoming the counterpart of the all-new top level Fairlane sedan line. The listed retail price was $2,392 ($28,749 in 2025 dollars) and production increased to 19,011.

For 1955, Ford consolidated its three station wagons into a distinct model line separate from its sedans. In a change that would last through 1968, the Country Squire was the flagship Ford station wagon, with the four-door (non-wood) Country Sedan and the two-door Ranch Wagon. In 1956, the two-door Parklane was introduced; intended to compete with the Chevrolet Nomad, the Parklane combined the body of the Ranch Wagon with the trim of the Fairlane (similar to the Country Squire interior).

=== Model overview ===
Largely carryover from 1954, the Country Squire chassis retained its 115.5 inch wheelbase and chassis underpinnings. While the roofline from the B-pillar rearward was essentially identical from the previous generation, a panoramic windshield (with a vertical A-pillar) was introduced. The wood trim was revised, with the DI-NOC transfers adopting the style of a wood-bodied motorboat; the fiberglass trim was extended into the front fenders (the simulated "ponton fender" was removed). For the first time, power windows were offered as an option, at the time considered a luxury feature.

For 1956, alongside all Fords, the Country Squire received a new grille, distinguished by rectangular turn signals/parking lights and wider openings. In a functional change, Ford upgraded to a 12-volt electrical system, allowing additional starting power and capability with electrical-power options. Coinciding with the upgrade, air conditioning was introduced as an option. The Lifeguard option package was introduced, offering a deep-dish steering wheel, upgraded door latches (to prevent ejection); as an option, seat belts and a padded dashboard were offered.

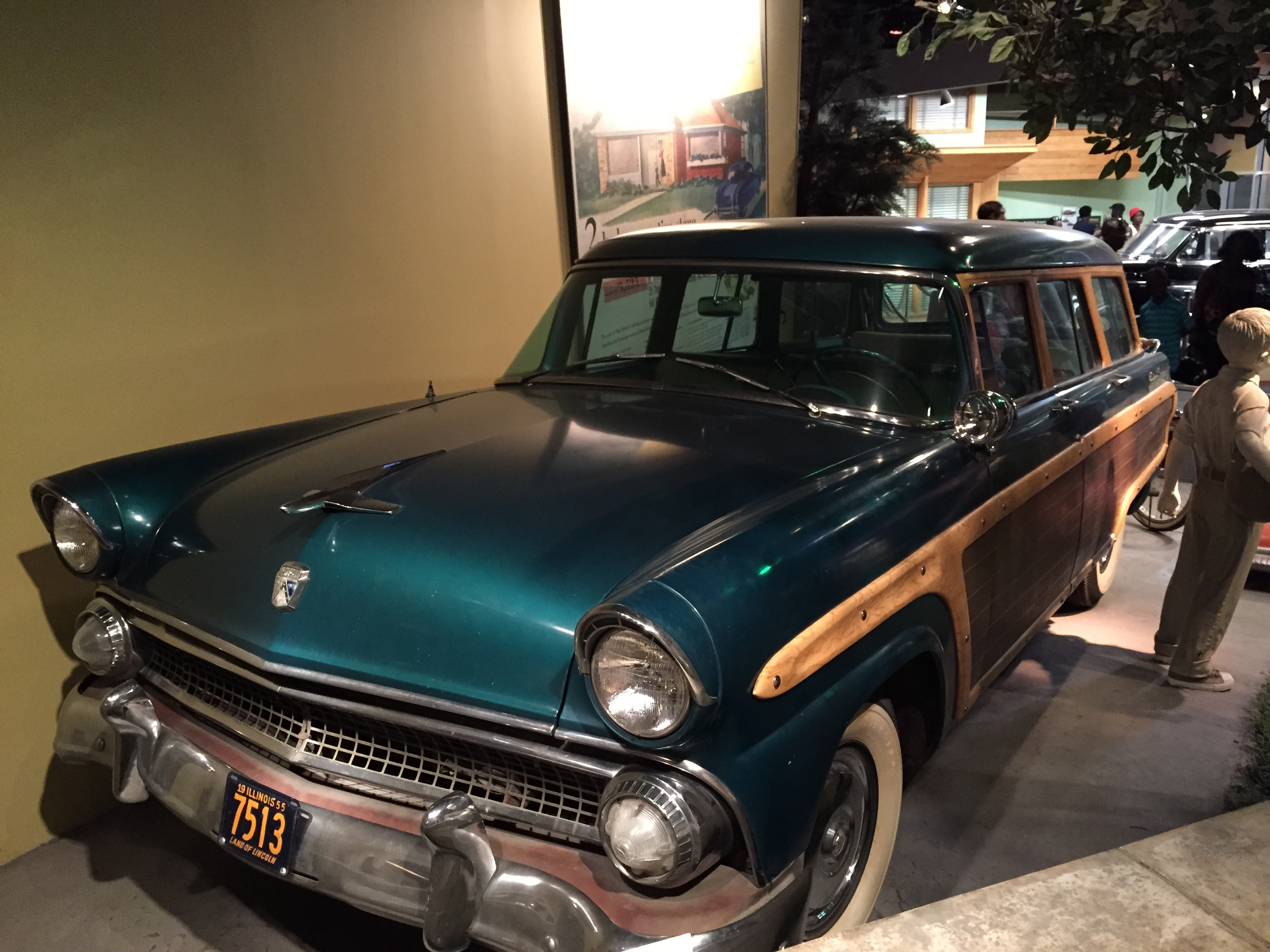
1955 Fairlane Country Squire at National Museum of American History, front ¾

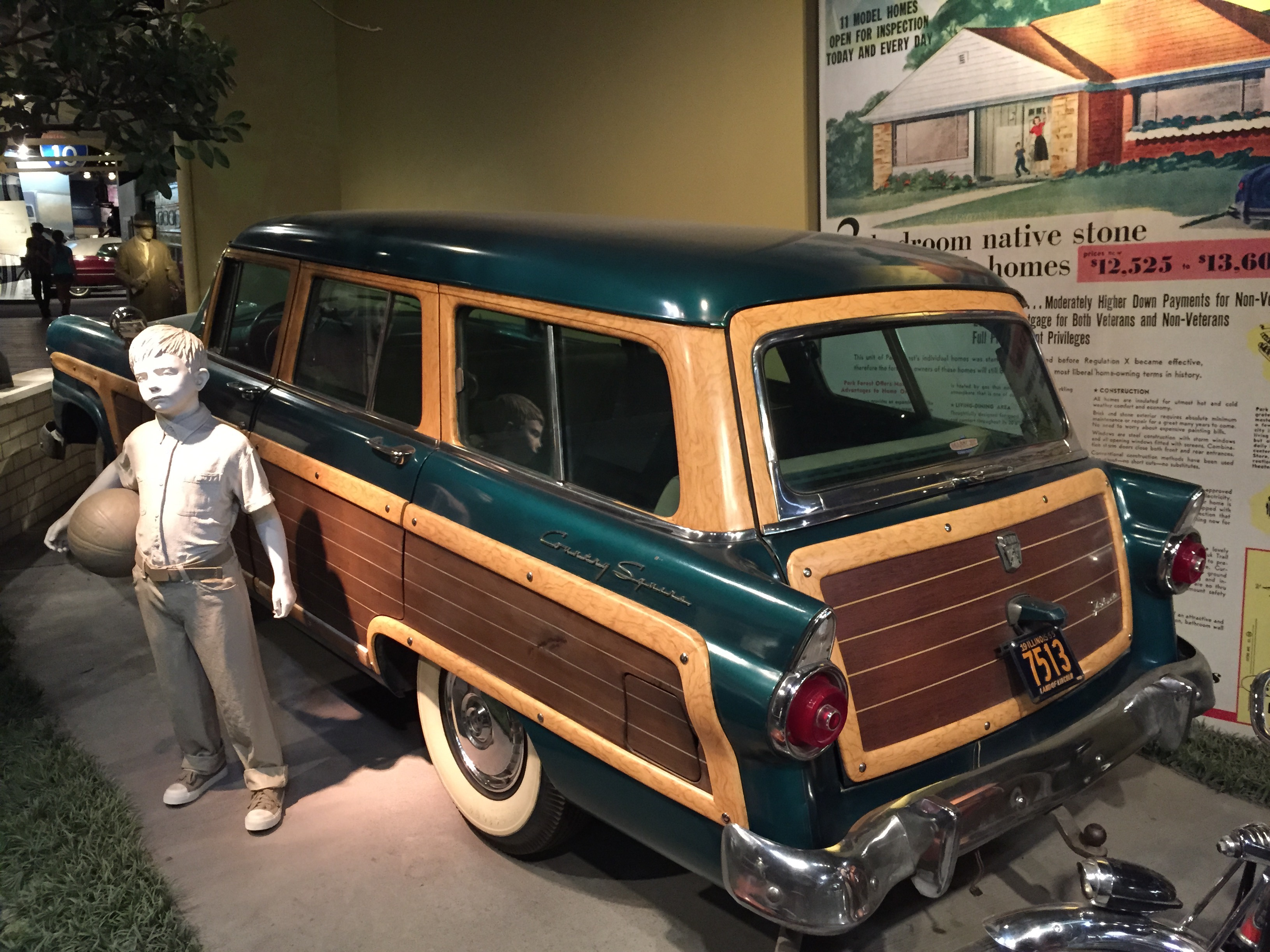
rear ¾

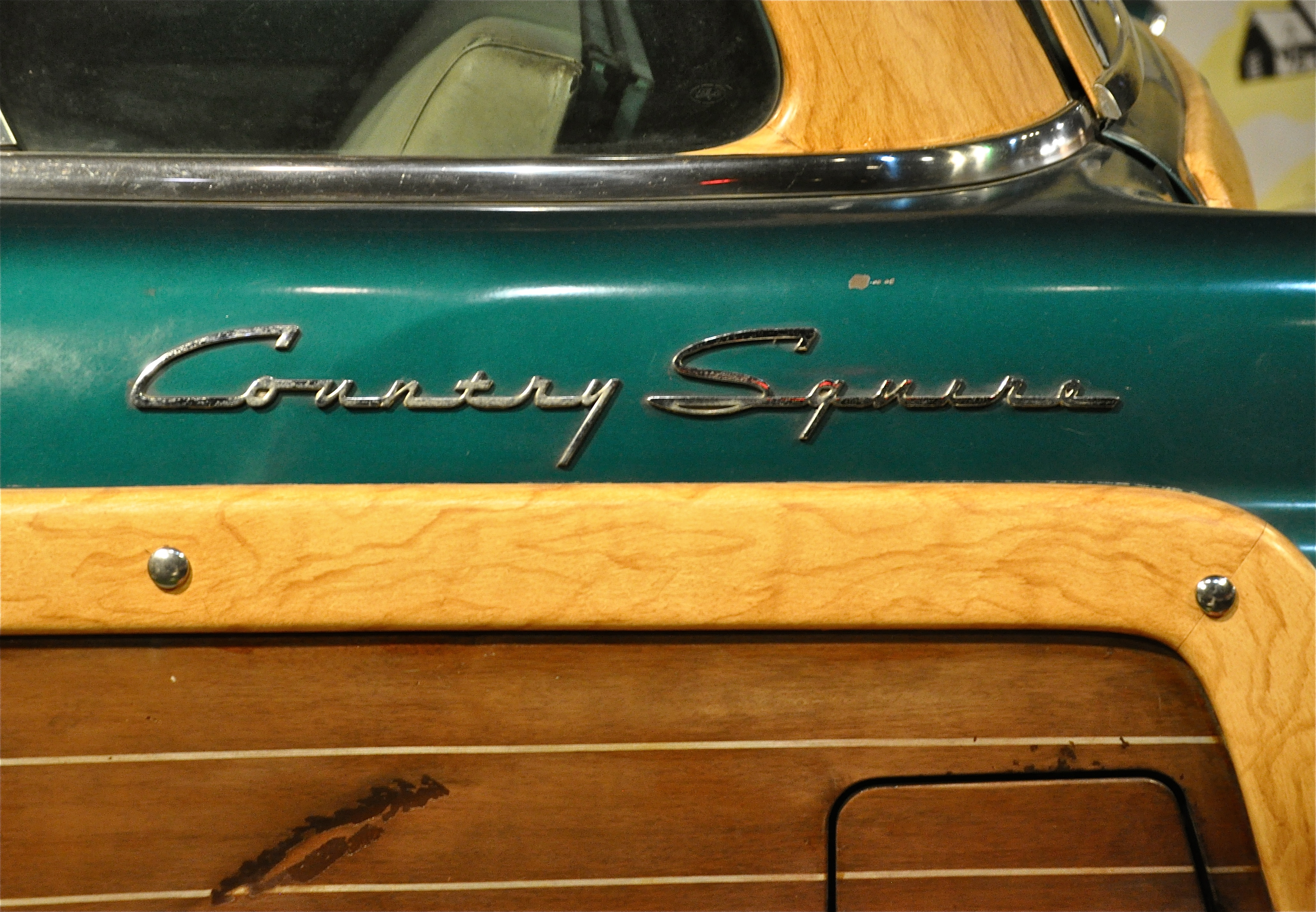
Fairlane Country Squire emblem

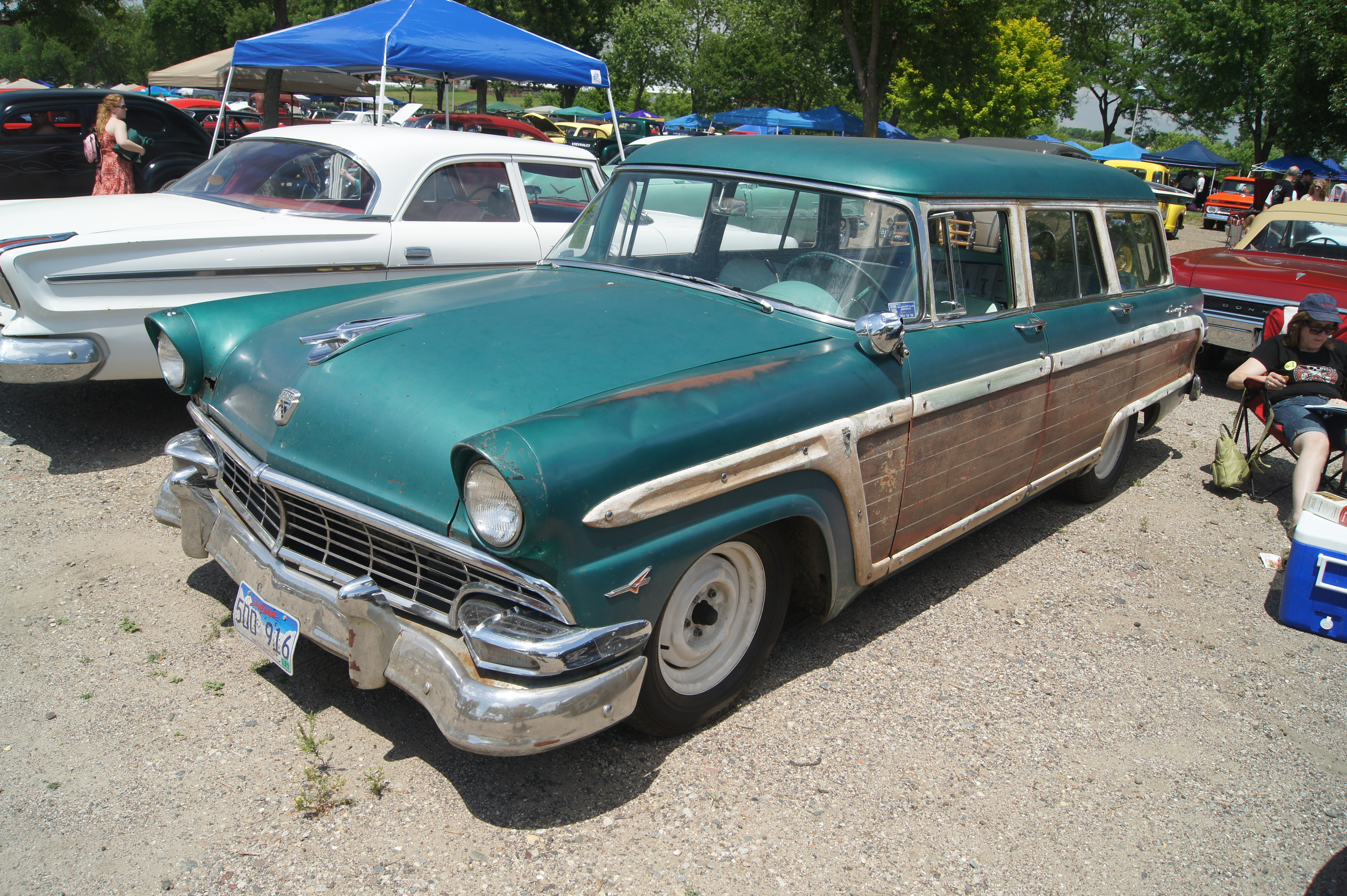
1956 Ford Country Squire

==== Powertrain ====
Carried over from the previous generation, the standard engine of the third-generation Country Squire was the 223 cu in (3.7 L) "Mileage Maker" inline-6, increasing output to 120 hp (89 kW; 122 PS). For the first time, the Country Squire was available with several optional V8 engines with multiple power outputs. Shared with the Fairlane, a 272 cu in (4.5 L) Y-block V8 produced 162 hp (121 kW; 164 PS) (2-barrel carburetor) or 182 hp (136 kW; 185 PS) (4-barrel carburetor). Shared with the Thunderbird, a 292 cu in (4.8 L) V8 produced 198 hp. For 1956, the 272 was replaced by the 292, increased to 202 hp (151 kW; 205 PS). A 312 cu in (5.1 L) Y-block (shared with the Thunderbird and Mercury) offered up to 225 hp (168 kW; 228 PS) was optional only by special order.

=== Sales ===
Third-generation Country Squire production
| Year | Sales |
|---|---|
| 1955 | 19,011 |
| 1956 | 23,221 |

== Fourth generation (1957–1959) ==
Fourth generation
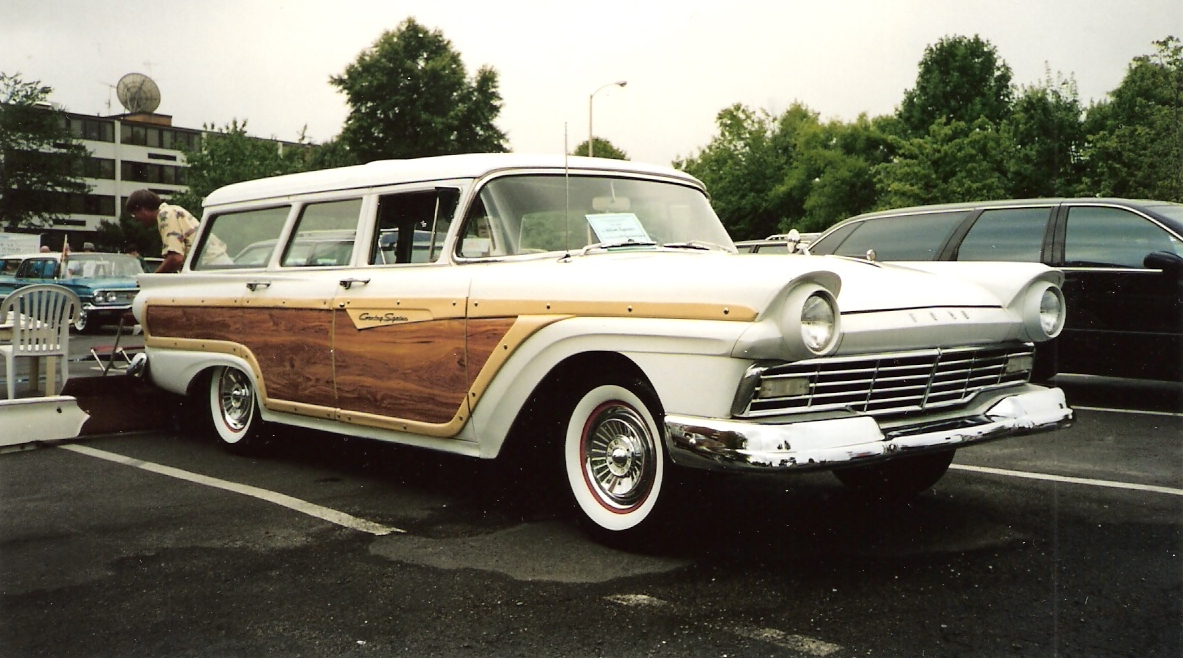
- 1957 Ford Fairlane 500 Country Squire

Overview
- Production: 1957–1959
- Assembly: United States: Main plant; Dearborn, MI; Branch Assembly; Twin Cities, MN; Somerville, MA; Richmond, CA; Norfolk, VA; Memphis, TN; Louisville, KY; Long Beach, CA; Kansas City, MO; Edgewater, NJ; Dallas, TX; Chicago, IL; Chester, PA; Buffalo, NY; Atlanta, GA

Body and chassis
- Body style: 4-door station wagon
- Chassis: body-on-frame
- Related: Ford Fairlane 500; Ford Country Sedan; Ford Ranchero; Edsel Bermuda; Mercury Colony Park

Powertrain
- Engine: 223 cu in (3.7 L) Mileage Maker I6; 292 cu in (4.8 L) Thunderbird V8; 312 cu in (5.1 L) Thunderbird Special V8; 312 cu in (5.1 L) Thunderbird Super V8 supercharged; 332 cu in (5.4 L) FE V8; 352 cu in (5.8 L) FE V8
- Transmission: 3-speed manual 4-speed manual 3-speed Fordomatic automatic 3-speed Cruise-O-Matic automatic

Dimensions
- Wheelbase: 1957-1958: 116 in (2,946 mm); 1959:118 in (2,997 mm)
- Length: 203.5 in (5,168.9 mm)
- Width: 78.2 in (1,986.3 mm)
- Height: 59.9 in (1,521.5 mm)

For 1957, the Ford model line underwent its first complete redesign for the first time since 1952. In line with other American manufacturers, a central part of the redesign was lower body height, requiring an all-new chassis to accommodate a lower floor. The only station wagon with standard-equipment wood paneling (of any type) from 1954 to 1956, the Country Squire was joined by the Mercury Colony Park in 1957 and briefly with the Edsel Bermuda in 1958.

=== Model overview ===
Coinciding with the use of a lower body and interior floor, the fourth generation was wider than its predecessor, increasing from eight passenger-seating to nine for the first time. For the fourth-generation Country Squire, Ford returned to extensive annual model revisions, with only the roofline and doors shared between all three model years. For 1957 27,690 were manufactured with a listed retail price of $2,556 ($29,300 in 2025 dollars).

==== Chassis specifications ====
The 1957 Ford chassis was a split-wheelbase platform; the 118-inch wheelbase was exclusive to the Fairlane, with Ford (and Edsel) station wagons sharing a 116-inch wheelbase with the Ford Custom. To allow for a lower floor, the frame layout changed from a truck-style ladder frame to a perimeter frame. A configuration used until the 2011 discontinuation of the Ford Crown Victoria, the perimeter frame allowed the floorpan to sit between the frame rails (instead of above them). To further reduce vehicle height, the rear leaf springs were moved outboard of the frame rails and the wheels were decreased in diameter from 15 to 14 inches.

For 1958, rear air suspension became an option for the first time; intended to keep the load floor at a constant height, the system saw few buyers. In line with all Ford sedans, the 1959 Country Squire adopted the 118-inch wheelbase previously exclusive to the Fairlane.

===== Powertrain =====
For 1957, the Country Squire carried over all three engines from the 1956 model year, with revised power outputs. A 144 hp 223 cubic-inch Mileage Maker inline-6 was the standard engine. The 292 cubic-inch V8 returned (with a two-barrel carburetor), producing 212 hp. Three versions of the 312 cubic-inch V8 were offered: 245 hp (four-barrel), 270 hp (dual four-barrel), and 300 hp (dual four-barrel, supercharger).

For 1958, while the inline-6 returned, the Y-block engines were replaced with an all-new set of V8 engines, named the FE-series (Ford/Edsel). Two displacements were available, a 332 cubic-inch V8 (240 hp with a 2-barrel carburetor; 265 hp with a 4-barrel carburetor) or 352 cubic inches (300 horsepower, four-barrel carburetor). For 1959, the engine line was revised further, with a 200 hp 292 V8 becoming the standard V8, the two-barrel 332 detuned to 225 hp (the four-barrel version discontinued); the 300-hp 352 V8 remained.

Alongside the 3-speed and 4-speed manual transmissions, Ford offered the 3-speed Fordomatic automatic. Coinciding with the 1958 introduction of the FE-series V8s, the 3-speed Cruise-O-Matic automatic was introduced. Designed to make better use of all three gears, Cruise-O-Matic started in first gear (Fordomatic started in second, with first gear selected by downshifting into "L").

==== Body ====
In a major shift, for 1957, Ford station wagons no longer shared a body with a Mercury counterpart; instead, the body was developed for the Edsel line of station wagons, with the Country Squire becoming the counterpart of the Edsel Bermuda (distinguished by its combination of woodgrain sides and two-tone paint). While based on the shorter wheelbase of the Ford Custom, the Country Squire still shared trim with the Fairlane. Along with Ford sedans, the Country Squire adopted several design elements of the 1957 Ford Thunderbird, including its wraparound windshield (restyled with a forward-slanted A-pillar), short tailfins, and large round taillamps.

To further expand load capacity, the folding mechanism of the middle seat was redesigned, allowing for a completely flat load floor when stowed (the rear seat still had to be removed). To improve loading, the top half of the liftgate was widened, extending into the D-pillars.

For 1958, the front and rear fascias underwent a revision; while largely to accommodate quad headlamps, the taillamp design was revised (replacing two round taillamps with four oval ones) alongside the design of the wood trim. In a functional change, the liftgate mechanism was redesigned.

For 1959, coinciding with the wheelbase extension, the Country Squire grew over five inches in length. Adopting styling elements of the Mercury Country Cruiser Colony Park and the Edsel Villager, the Country Squire had a less angled front fascia with a wider grille, two large round taillamps, and redesigned tailfins (with turn signal lenses). In a major change, the simulated wood trim around the roof pillars was replaced by stainless steel, leaving the wood trim below the window line. The third seat was redesigned, allowing it to fold flat (after seat cushions were removed and stowed).

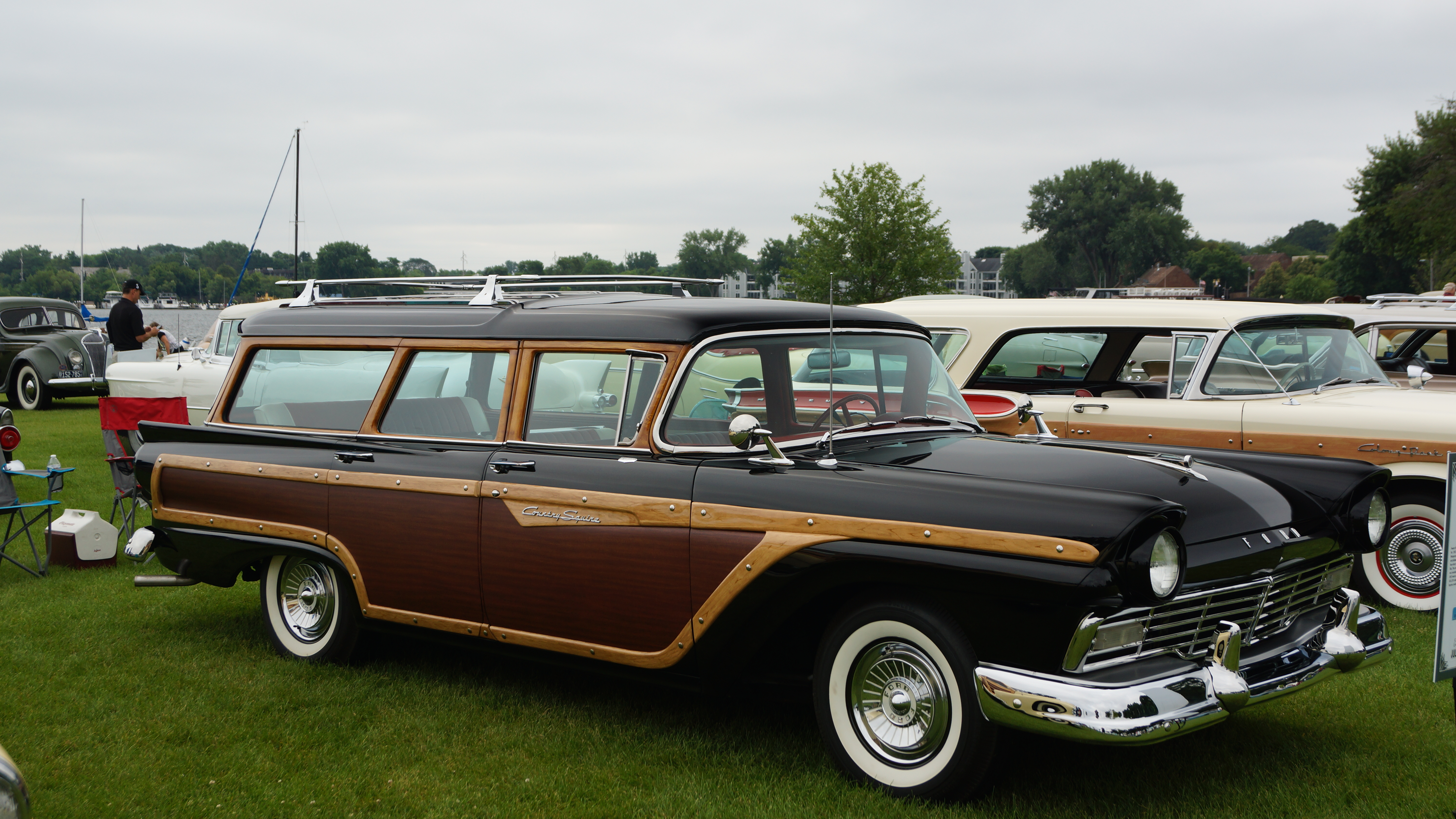
1957 Ford Fairlane 500 Country Squire

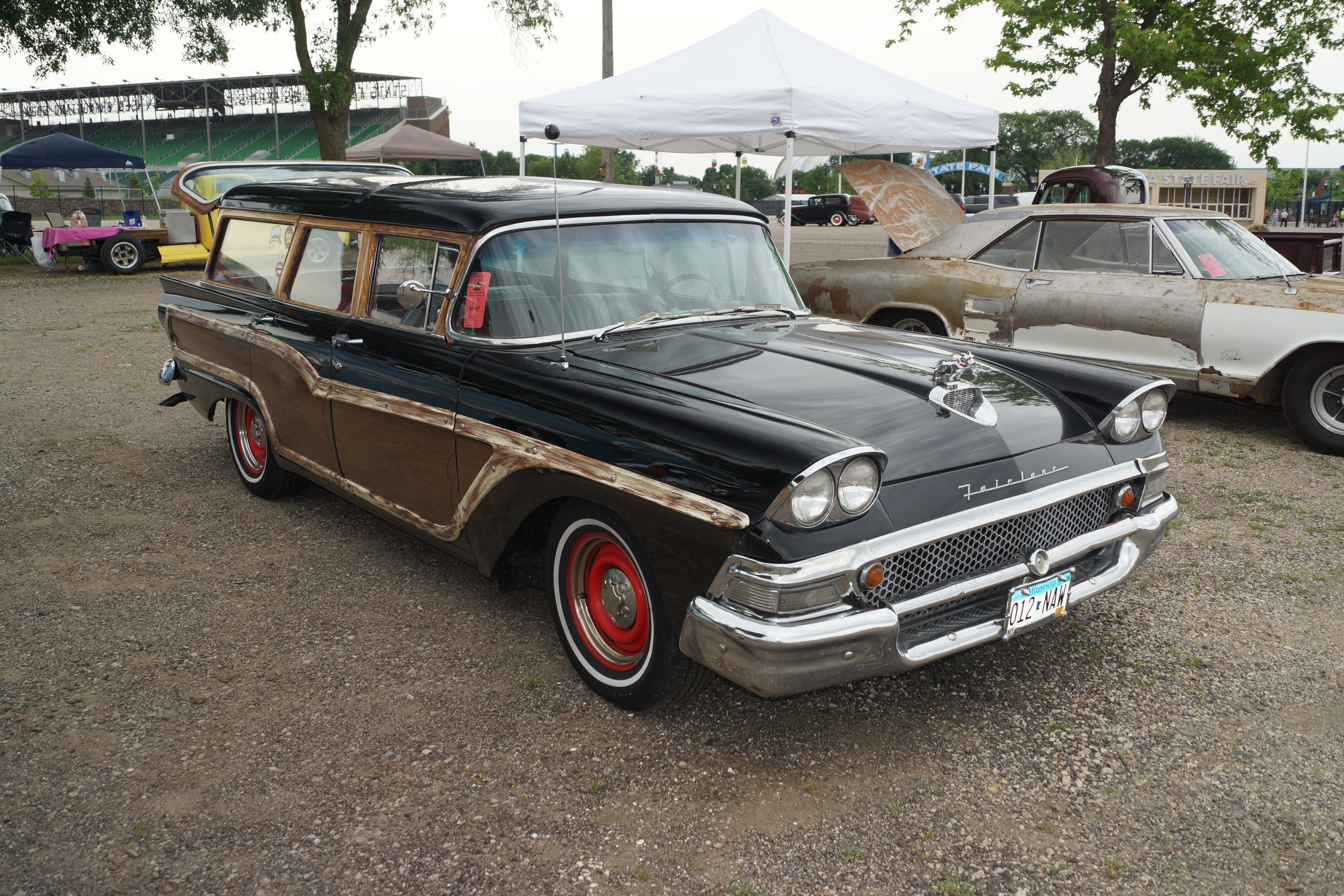
1958 Ford Fairlane 500 Country Squire

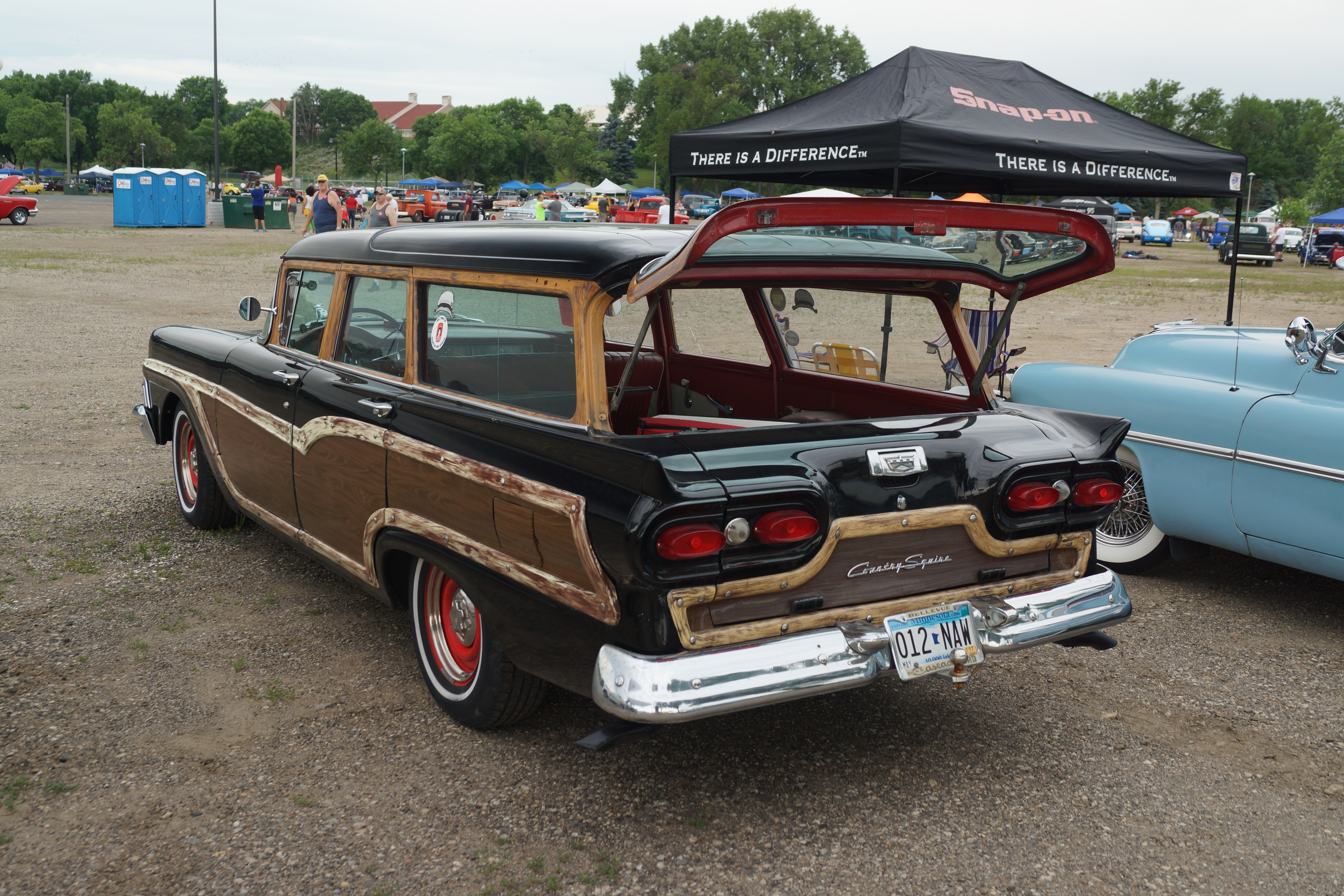
1958 Ford Fairlane 500 Country Squire, rear view (liftgate open)

=== Sales ===
Fourth-generation Country Squire production
| Year | Sales |
|---|---|
| 1957 | 27,690 |
| 1958 | 15,020 |
| 1959 | 24,336 |

== Fifth generation (1960–1964) ==
Fifth generation
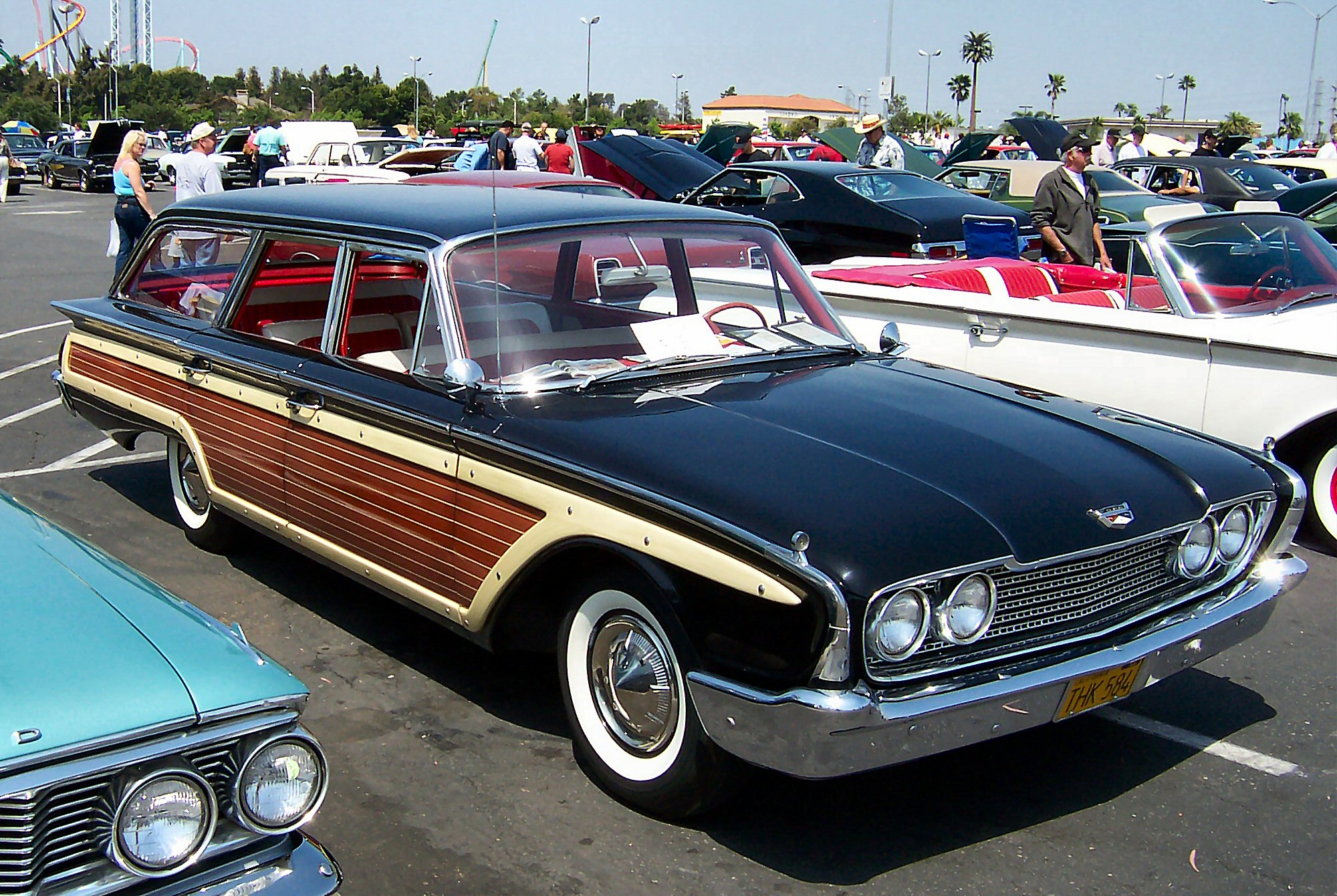
- 1960 Ford Galaxie Country Squire

Overview
- Model years: 1960–1964

Body and chassis
- Body style: 4-door station wagon
- Platform: 1960 Ford
- Chassis: body-on-frame
- Related: Ford Galaxie; Mercury Colony Park

Powertrain
- Engine: 223 cu in (3.7 L) Mileage Maker I6; 292 cu in (4.8 L) Y-Block V8; 260 cu in (4.3 L) Windsor V8; 289 cu in (4.7 L) Windsor V8; 352 cu in (5.8 L) FE V8; 390 cu in (6.4 L) FE V8
- Transmission: 3-speed manual 4-speed manual 3-speed Fordomatic automatic 3-speed Cruise-O-Matic automatic

Dimensions
- Wheelbase: 119 in (3,023 mm)
- Length: 209.8 in (5,329 mm)
- Width: 80.0 in (2,032 mm)
- Height: 57.9 in (1,471 mm)
- Curb weight: 4,134 lb (1,875 kg)

For the 1960 model year, in place of a yearly update, the Ford model line underwent a complete redesign. Coinciding with the introduction of the compact Falcon, full-size Fords grew in size, adopting a 119-inch wheelbase. As part of a model shift, the Galaxie was slotted above the Fairlane as the flagship Ford model range, with the Country Squire becoming its station wagon counterpart for 1960. For 1961, Mercury revised its model range following the discontinuation of Edsel, with the Monterey becoming a longer-wheelbase version of the Galaxie; in a change that would last until their 1991 discontinuation, the Colony Park became the more exclusive and upscale Mercury counterpart to the Country Squire. The 1960 version with the V8 was listed at US$3,080 ($33,520 in 2025 dollars) before optional equipment was added. Starting with 1962, the Galaxie became the senior, full-size model series when the Ford Fairlane became the intermediate model series on a shorter wheelbase, and was also offered as a station wagon with optionally available woodgrained appearance.

=== Model overview ===
Retaining the use of a perimeter frame, the Country Squire grew in size over its predecessor, five inches wider and five inches longer than its predecessor. The wood exterior trim returned to the appearance of boat decking, with a simpler border trim design. To improve entry and exit, the forward-sloping A-pillar was replaced by a rearward-sloping design, allowing for wider front door opening. While the third-row seat still required the removal of the lower cushion to fold flat, access was improved as one-third of the second-row seat folded separately.

==== Chassis specifications ====
The 1960 Ford chassis, used by the fifth-generation Country Squire with a 119-inch wheelbase, shared with all other full-size Ford models. To improve handling, the rear leaf suspension was redesigned with longer springs, as part of anti-dive and anti-squat control. The front suspension is a double wishbone configuration, with ball-jointed A-arms. Shared with the F-Series, the Country Squire used 11-inch drum brakes on all four wheels.

===== Powertrain =====
At its launch, the fifth-generation retained several engines from the previous generation. A 145 hp 223 cubic-inch inline-six was standard, with three optional V8 engines. A 292 cubic-inch V8 (retuned to 185 hp) made its return, along with a 352 cubic-inch V8 (235 hp with 2-barrel; 300 hp with 4-barrel). For 1961, the engines were detuned, with the six making 135 hp, the 292 175 hp, and the 352 220 hp (the 300 hp V8 remained). For 1962, the engines were retuned to 138 hp for the inline-6 and 170 hp for the 292; while the 220 hp version of the 352 remained, the 300 hp version was replaced by a 390 cubic-inch V8 producing 300 hp (the only version of the 390 offered with the Country Squire). For 1963, the 292 V8 was discontinued, replaced by a 164 hp 260 cubic-inch V8. For 1964, the 260 V8 was expanded to 289 cubic inches (producing 195 hp); the 352 was retuned to 250 hp.

As with the previous generation, three and four-speed (overdrive) manual transmissions were offered, along with three-speed Fordomatic or Cruise-O-Matic automatics. For 1964, the 3-speed manual was redesigned, becoming synchronized in all three gears.

==== Body ====
In contrast to the fourth generation Country Squire, the fifth generation largely abandoned yearly body updates. The body design was more conservative, integrating the headlights into the grille and fairing the bumper more closely into the fenders. For 1961, the rear tailgate underwent a complete redesign, abandoning the two-piece tailgate for a one-piece tailgate with a roll-down window which had been previously offered on Mercury station wagons as standard equipment beginning in 1957. As part of the tailgate design, a safety lockout required the rear window to be fully lowered before the tailgate could be lowered; the window was lowered either manually or electrically. On both tailgate designs, the tailgate used a torsion bar spring to counterbalance its hinge.

Coinciding with the liftgate redesign for 1961, the front and rear fascias were redesigned, marking the return of (small) tailfins and large round taillamps, in line with the Ford Thunderbird. For 1964, the Country Squire underwent a facelift of its rear fascia (deleting the tailfins) and its side trim, with a redesign of the wood trim.

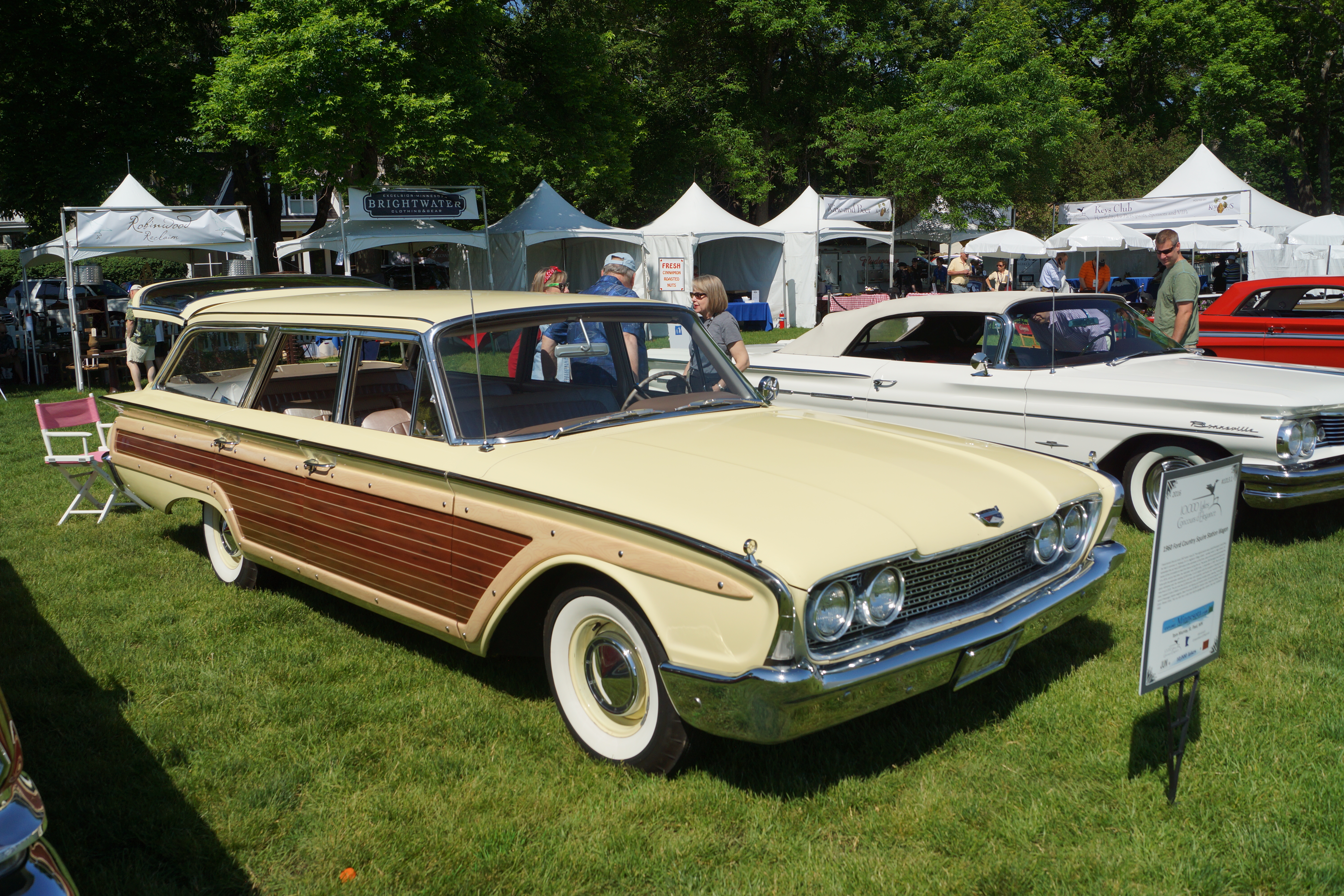
1960 Ford Galaxie Country Squire

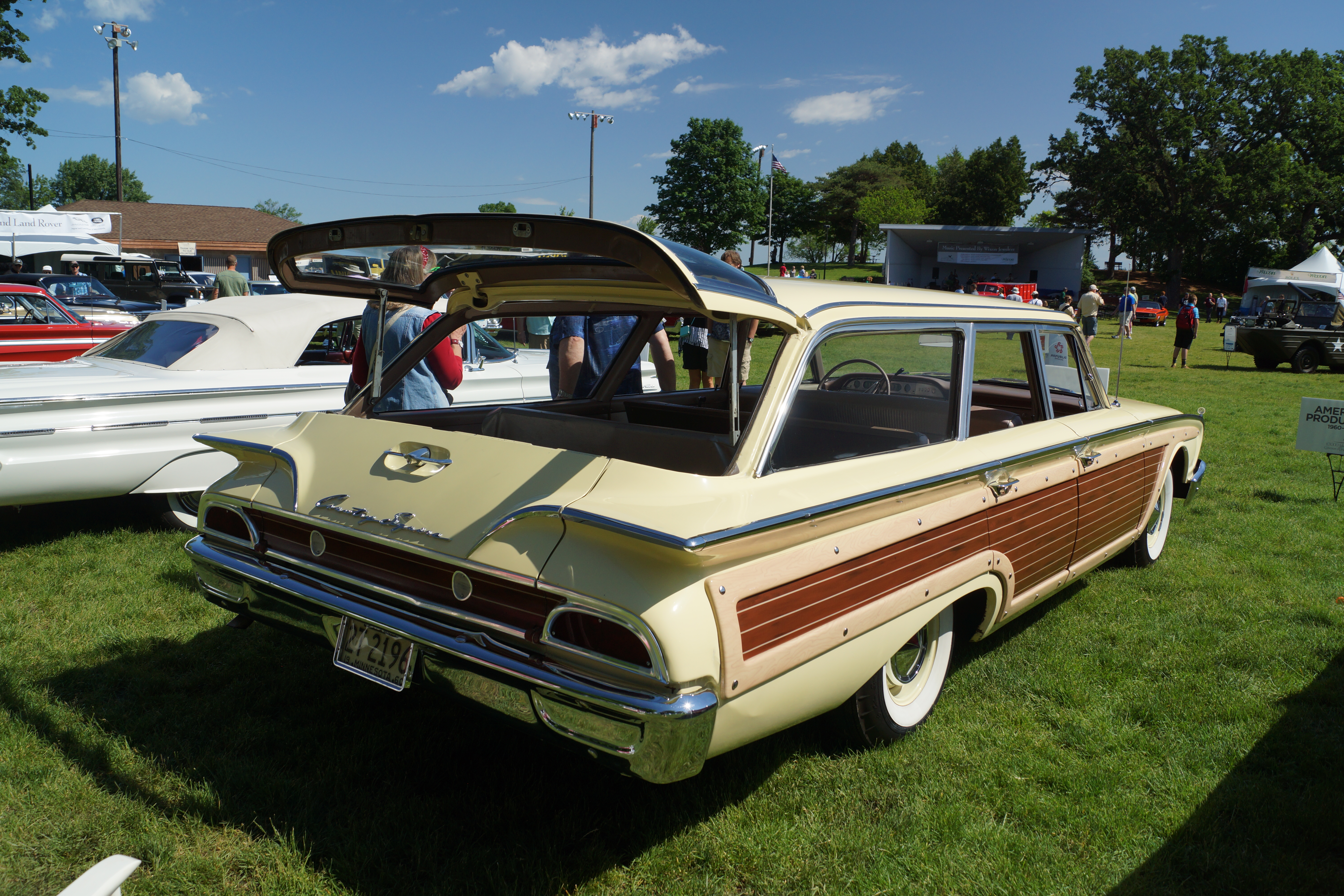
1960 Ford Galaxie Country Squire, rear

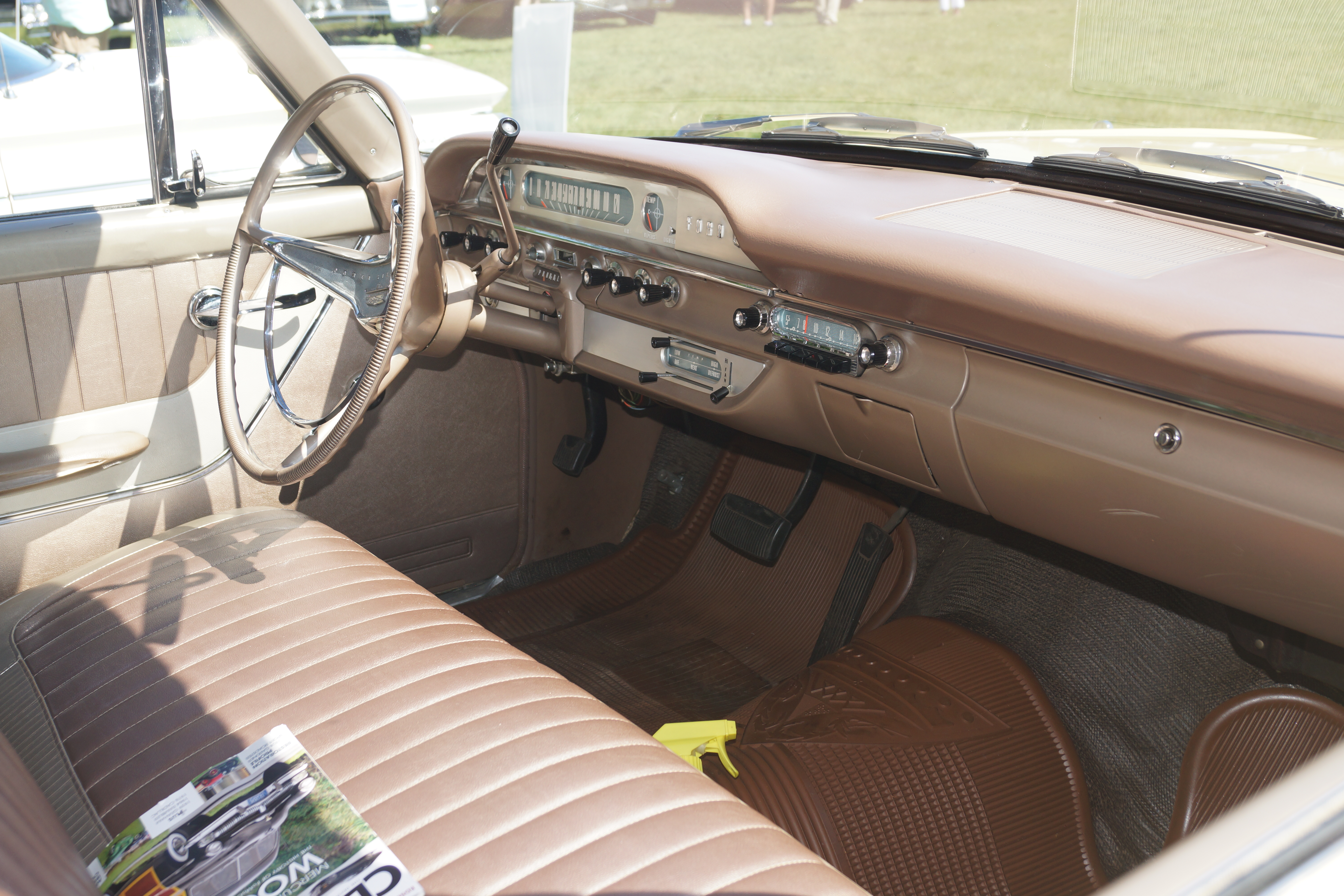
1960 Ford Galaxie Country Squire, dashboard

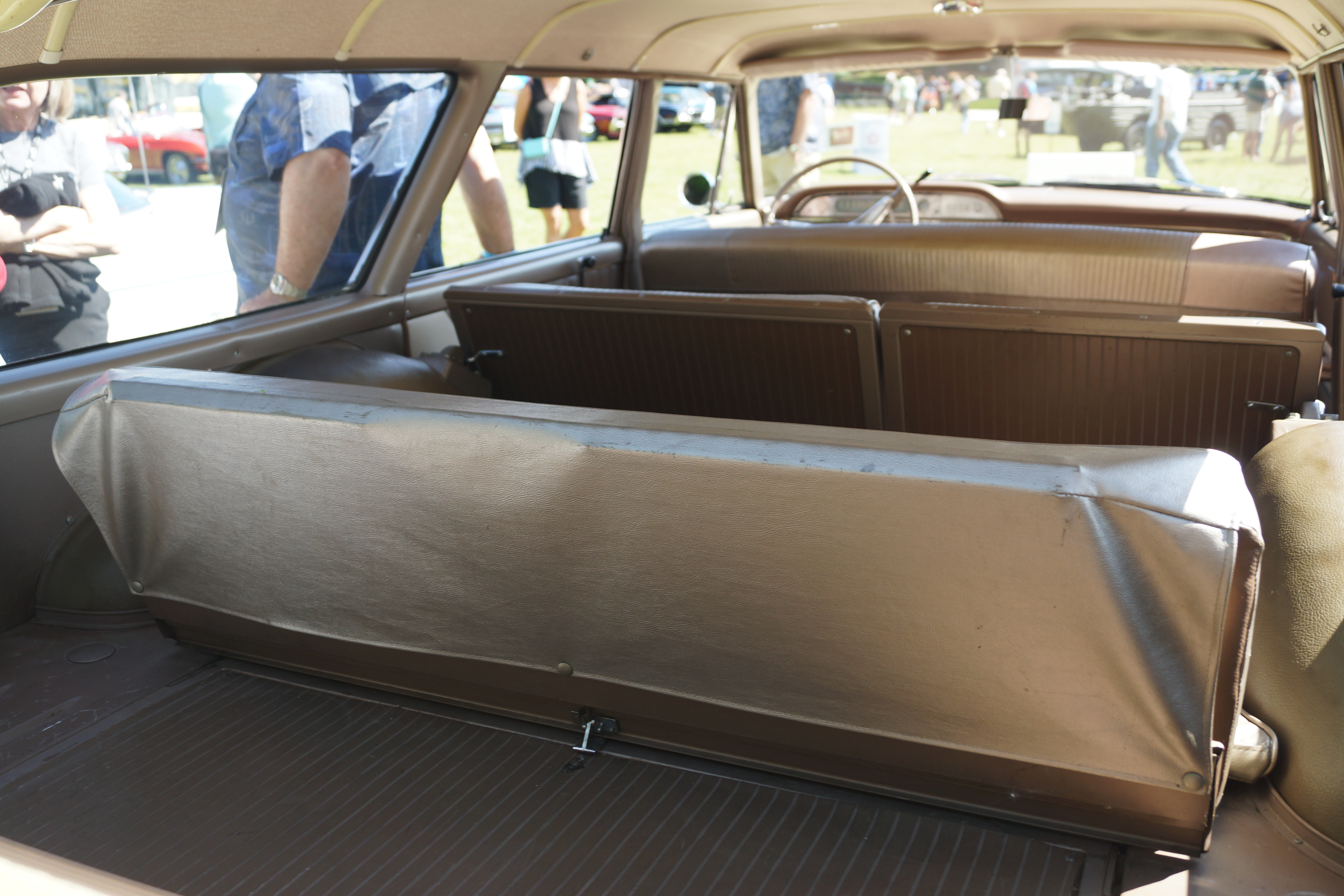
1960 Ford Galaxie Country Squire, rear interior

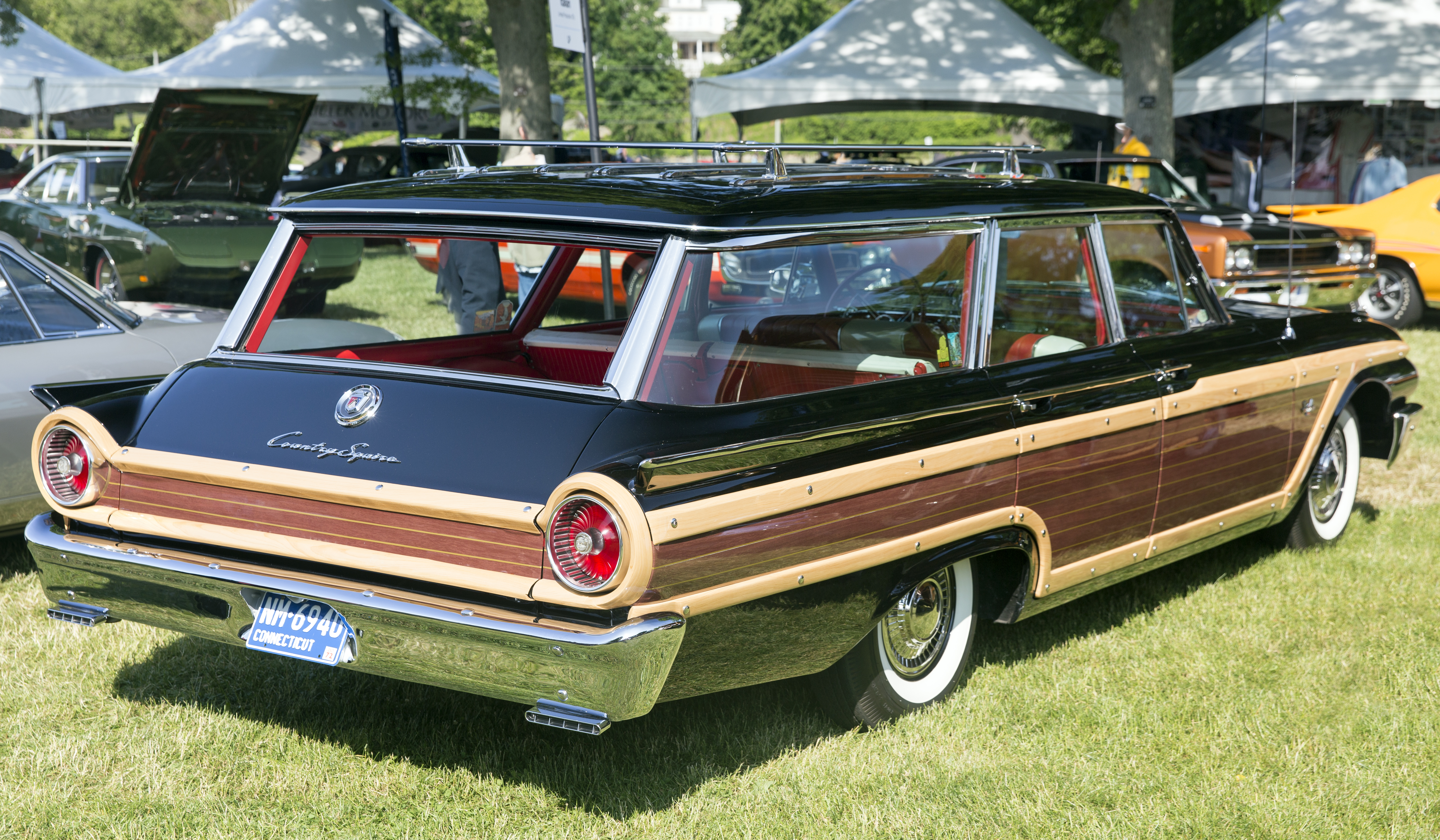
1961 Ford Country Squire, rear

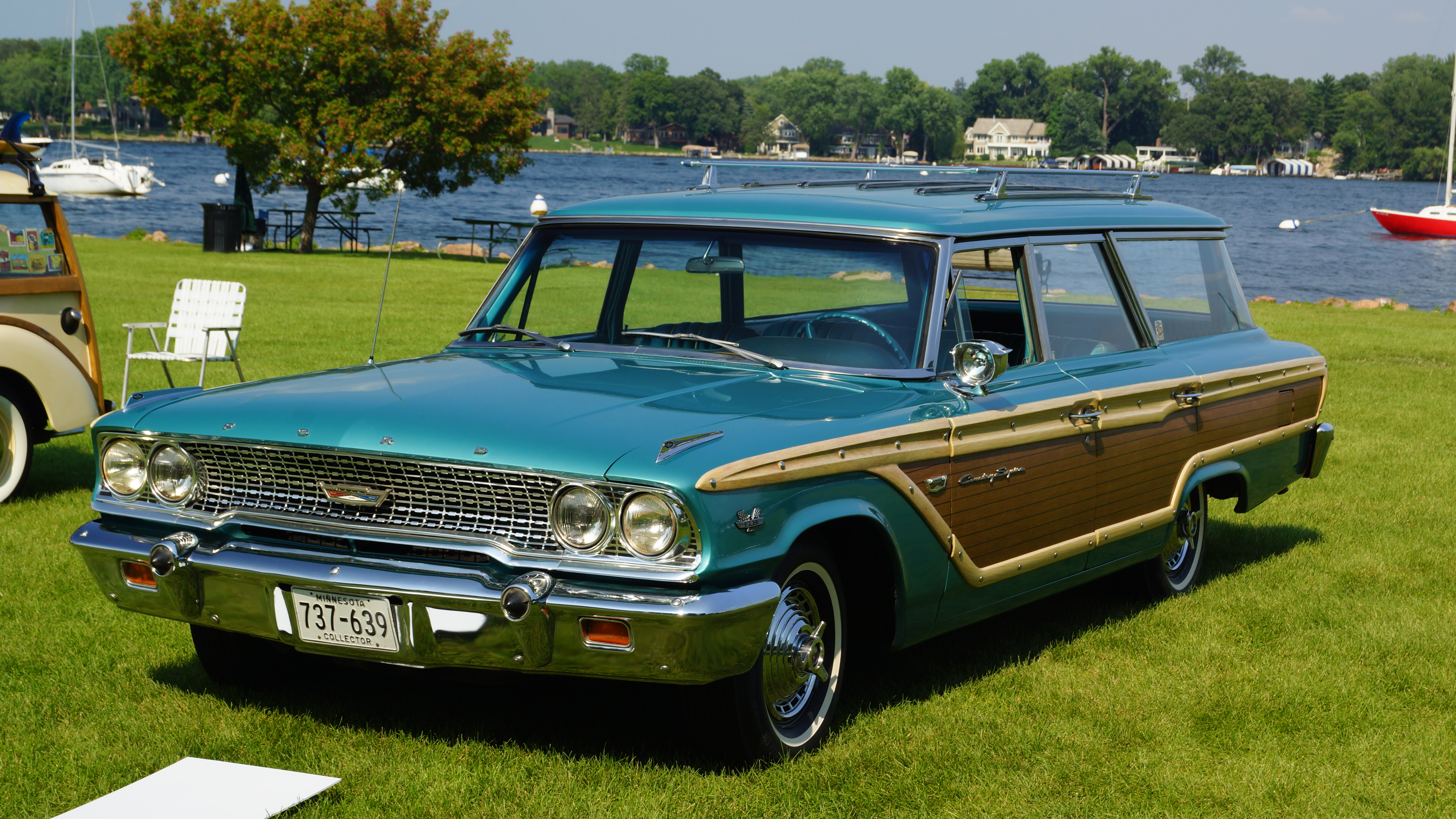
1963 Ford Galaxie Country Squire

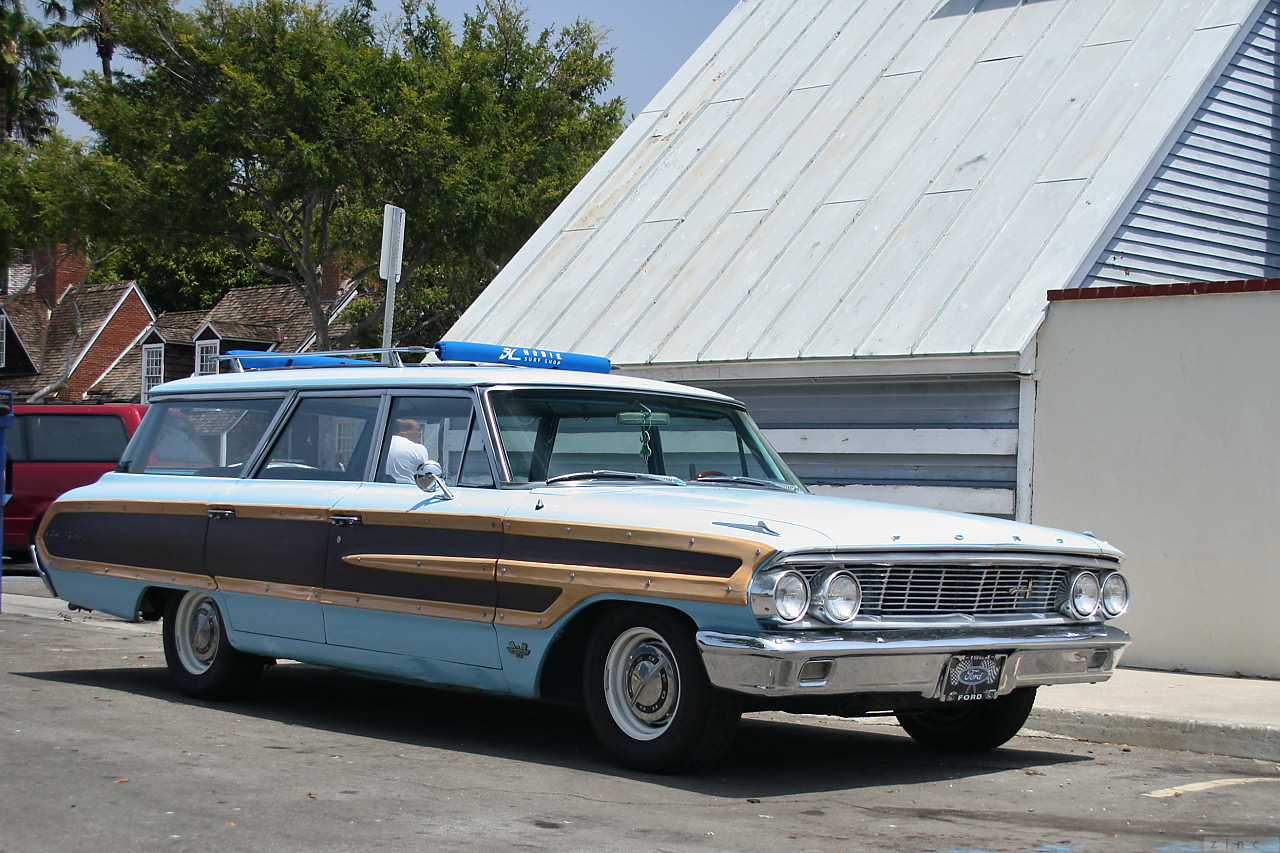
1964 Ford Galaxie Country Squire

=== Sales ===
Fifth-generation Country Squire production (6- and 9 passenger combined)
| Year | Sales |
|---|---|
| 1960 | 22,237 |
| 1961 | 31,618 |
| 1962 | 32,228 |
| 1963 | 39,168 |
| 1964 | 46,690 |

== Sixth generation (1965–1968) ==
Sixth generation
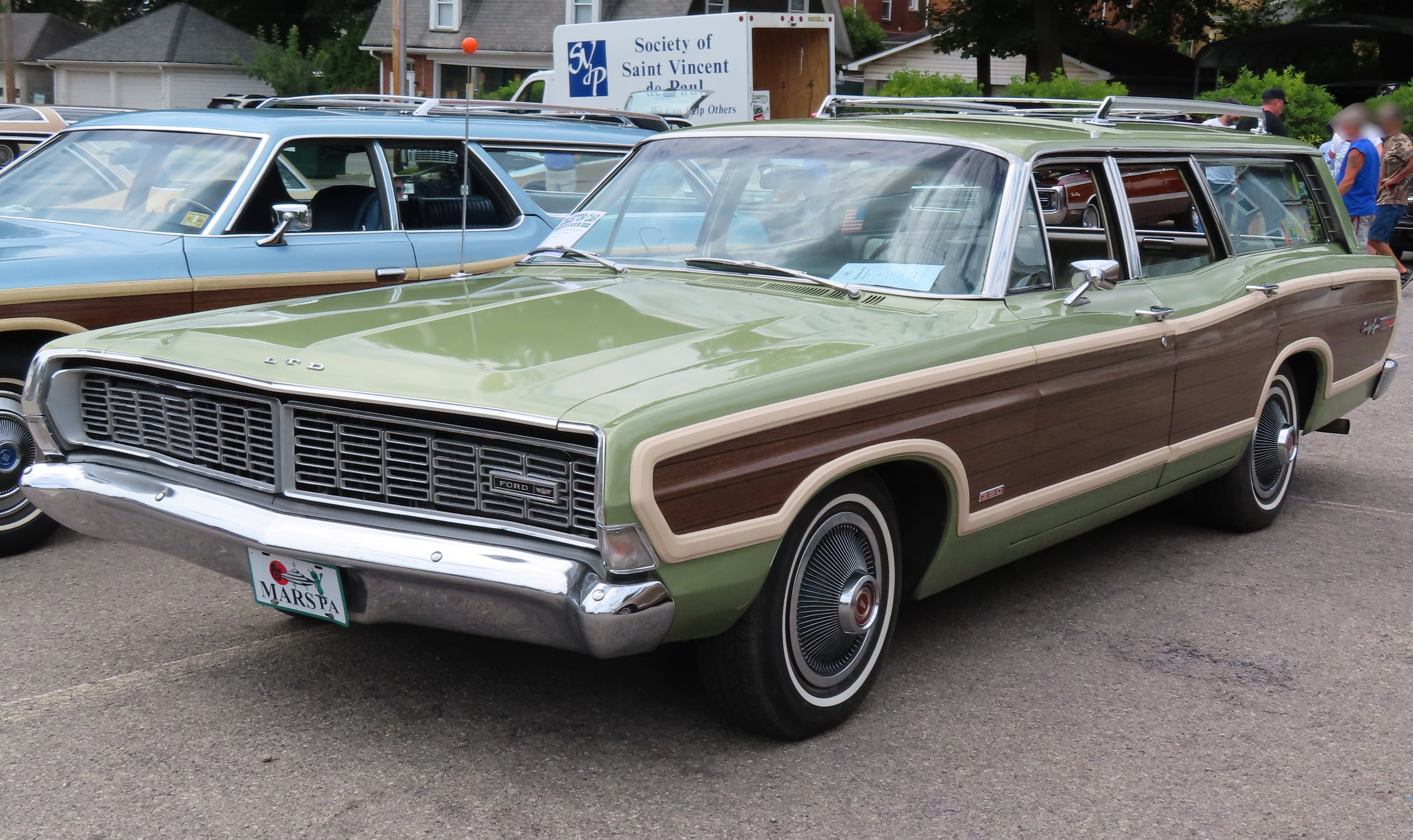
- 1968 Ford LTD Country Squire

Overview
- Production: 1965–1968

Body and chassis
- Body style: 4-door station wagon
- Chassis: body-on-frame
- Related: Ford LTD; Mercury Colony Park

Powertrain
- Engine: 240 cu in (3.9 L) Big Six I6; 289 cu in (4.7 L) Windsor V8; 302 cu in (4.9 L) Windsor V8; 352 cu in (5.8 L) FE V8; 390 cu in (6.4 L) FE V8; 428 cu in (7.0 L) FE V8
- Transmission: 3-speed Borg-Warner T150 manual 4-speed Borg-Warner T85 overdrive manual 3-speed Cruise-o-Matic (C4) automatic

Dimensions
- Wheelbase: 119.0 in (3,020 mm)
- Length: 210.0 in (5,330 mm)
- Width: 77.4 in (1,970 mm)
- Height: 56.7 in (1,440 mm)
- Curb weight: 4,277 lb (1,940 kg)

For the 1965 model year, the full-size Ford model line underwent a complete redesign with an all-new chassis. Alongside the introduction of the Ford LTD, the Country Squire was a counterpart of the Galaxie 500 model line alongside the non-woodgrain Country Sedan (alongside the standard Galaxie). The 1965 version with the V8 was listed at US$3,216 ($39,803 in 2025 dollars).

During the production of the sixth-generation Country Squire, wood-trimmed station wagons (in simulated form) underwent a revival in production. Previously exclusive to Ford and Mercury from 1954 to 1965, counterpart station wagons entered production during the end of the 1960s. For 1966, Chrysler reintroduced wood trim for the Town & Country station wagon (and for the first Dodge Monaco station wagon). General Motors introduced wood trim for the 1966 Chevrolet Caprice Estate and in 1967 for the Buick Sport Wagon and Oldsmobile Vista Cruiser. As part of the 1968 introduction of the intermediate Ford Torino and Mercury Montego, a Torino Squire and Montego Villager station wagon were introduced with woodgrain exterior trim.

As the LTD became a full model line for the 1968 model year, the Country Squire became its station wagon counterpart, with Ford adding "LTD" badging to the hood. The 1968 LTD 9-passenger version with the V8 was listed at US$3,619 ($33,506 in 2025 dollars) before optional equipment installed.

=== Model overview ===
To comply with the implementation of safety regulations in the United States, many running changes were made during this generation, effectively standardizing the equipment introduced by the Lifeguard option package. For 1966, Ford standardized front and rear seat belts, a padded dashboard and sun visors, a deep-dish steering wheel, reinforced door latches, and emergency flashers. For 1967, as part of federal regulations, the steering wheel was fitted with a padded center and fitted to an energy-absorbing (collapsible) steering column; other requirements included padded interior surfaces, recessed controls on the instrument panel, and front outboard shoulder belt anchors. As an added degree of redundancy, a dual-chamber brake master cylinder was added for the 1968 model year (on the Country Squire, alongside all other vehicles sold in the United States).

==== Chassis specifications ====
The rear-wheel drive 1965 Ford chassis used by the sixth-generation Country Squire retained the 119-inch wheelbase of the previous generation. For higher strength and rigidity, the frame rails became fully-boxed; the perimeter frame configuration was retained. While again using a double-wishbone, ball-jointed A-arm configuration for the front suspension, the front track width was widened to improve handling. The rear leaf springs were discontinued, replaced with a three-link coil-sprung solid rear axle; in various forms, Ford would use this suspension configuration on rear-wheel drive full-size vehicles through the production of the final Ford Crown Victoria in 2011.

===== Powertrain =====
For the sixth generation, the Country Squire (alongside Ford full-size Country Sedan and F-Series trucks) received a new standard engine, with a 240 cubic-inch "Big Six" inline-6 (producing 150 hp) replacing the 223 cubic-inch "Mileage Maker" six. The three V8 engines were retained from the previous generations, with a 200 hp 289 cubic-inch V8, a 250 hp 352 cubic-inch V8, and a 300 hp 390 cubic-inch V8. For 1966, two versions of the 390 were introduced, producing 275 hp (2-bbl) or 315 hp (4-bbl). For the first time, a 428 cubic-inch V8 was offered on the Country Squire, producing 345 hp. For 1967, the 352 FE V8 was dropped, largely replaced by the 2-bbl version of the 390 (producing 270 hp). For 1968, the 289 was expanded to 302 cu in (4.9 L), producing 210 hp. The 2-bbl 390 and 428 were retuned, making 265 and 340 hp, respectively.

While maintaining powertrain commonality with the Ford Galaxie, on an official basis, Ford did not offer the Country Squire with any version of the 428 V8 producing over 345 hp, nor any 427 V8.

For the sixth-generation Country Squire, the 3-speed column-shifted manual made its return, along with the 4-speed overdrive manual. For 1967 only, a floor-shifted 4-speed manual was offered for the Country Squire (only with the 390 and 428 V8s). The Fordomatic 3-speed automatic was retired, with Cruise-O-Matic replaced by several 3-speed automatic designs marketed under the SelectShift name; the C4 was developed for inline-6 and small V8s, while the C6 was developed for large V8s; the FMX was introduced for medium-size engines in 1968.

==== Body ====
For the sixth generation, the Country Squire again shared its doors with four-door Ford sedans. While the roofline of the Country Squire was shared with the Mercury Colony Park, the two model lines shared different bodywork below the window lines (including front fascias and rear quarter panels). In a major styling change, full-size Ford's adopted vertically-stacked headlamps, raising the hood line and enlarging the grille.

In a design change that would last through its 1991 discontinuation, the 1965 Country Squire replaced the third-row rear seat configuration for two (optional) flat-folding rear seats facing towards the center of the cargo area, expanding seating to 10 passengers. Coinciding with all full-size Fords, the Country Squire adopted two-sided keys for 1965, introducing a valet key (while unlocking the front doors and starting the car, the key would not unlock the glovebox and rear cargo door).

Following a minor grille update for the 1967 model year, the Country Squire underwent an exterior update for the 1968 model year. Coinciding with the introduction of the 1966 Ford Thunderbird and its alignment with the Ford LTD, the Country Squire adopted its split-grille front fascia and no longer offering vertically stacked dual headlights, and adopting optionally available, vacuum-operated hidden headlamps; as a fail-safe, the system retracted the headlamp covers if engine vacuum was lost. While the feature was shared with the Colony Park (and its Marquis counterpart), the redesign marked a significant differentiation of front fascia designs between the two model lines. In another change, the taillamps switched from a square design (derived from the traditional Ford round taillamps of the 1940s and 1950s) to a vertically-oriented rectangle (a design used to 1991).

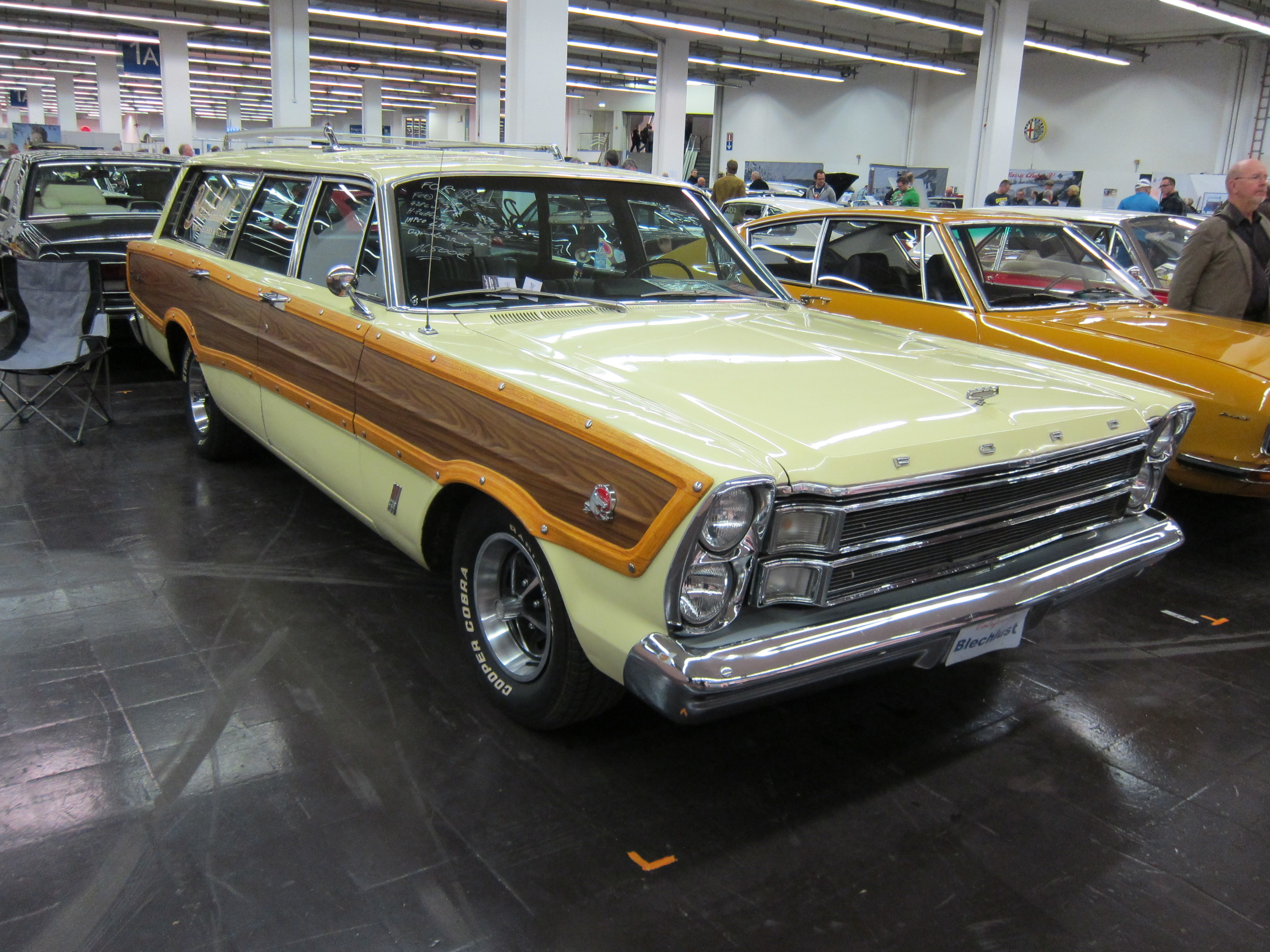
1966 Ford LTD Country Squire 428

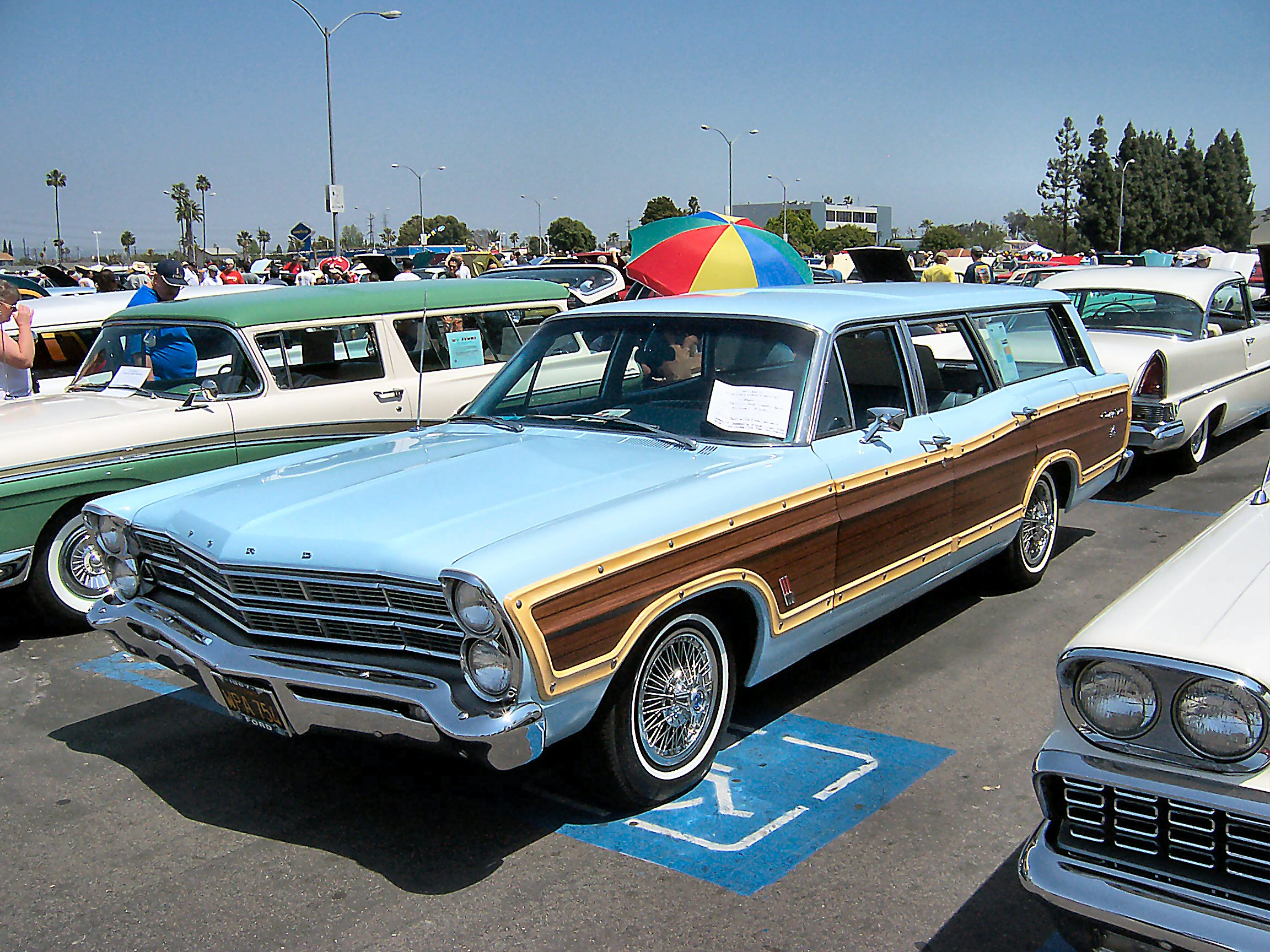
1967 Ford LTD Country Squire 390

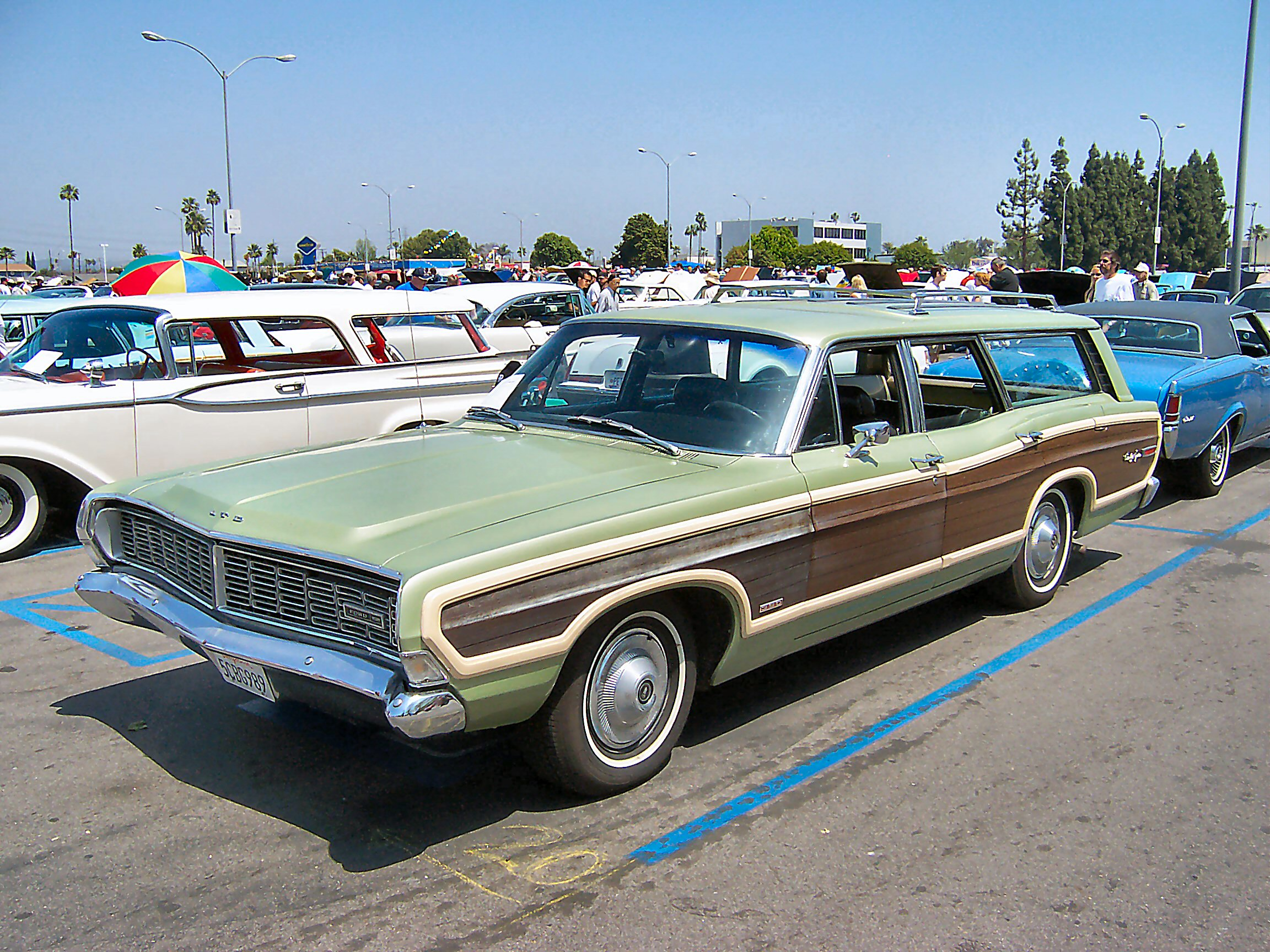
1968 Ford LTD Country Squire

===== Magic Doorgate =====
For 1966, all Ford wagons introduced the Magic Doorgate rear door configuration. Engineered by Donald N. Frey, the two-way tailgate configuration allowed the rear door to fold down (like a traditional tailgate) or hinge open to the side (as a door). The Magic Doorgate was made possible through a traditional stationary hinge on the passenger side and a combination of hinges on the driver side, carrying the weight of the tailgate when it swung outward. While opened by the exterior or interior door handle, the rear door would not open to the side or fold down unless the rear window was retracted.

In various adaptations, the two-way rear door would become utilized on full-size station wagons across Ford, General Motors, and AMC during the 1970s.

=== Sales ===
Sixth-generation Country Squire production (6- and 10 passenger combined)
| Year | Sales |
|---|---|
| 1965 | 54,810 |
| 1966 | 75,598 |
| 1967 | 69,624 |
| 1968 | 91,770 |

== Seventh generation (1969–1978) ==
Seventh generation
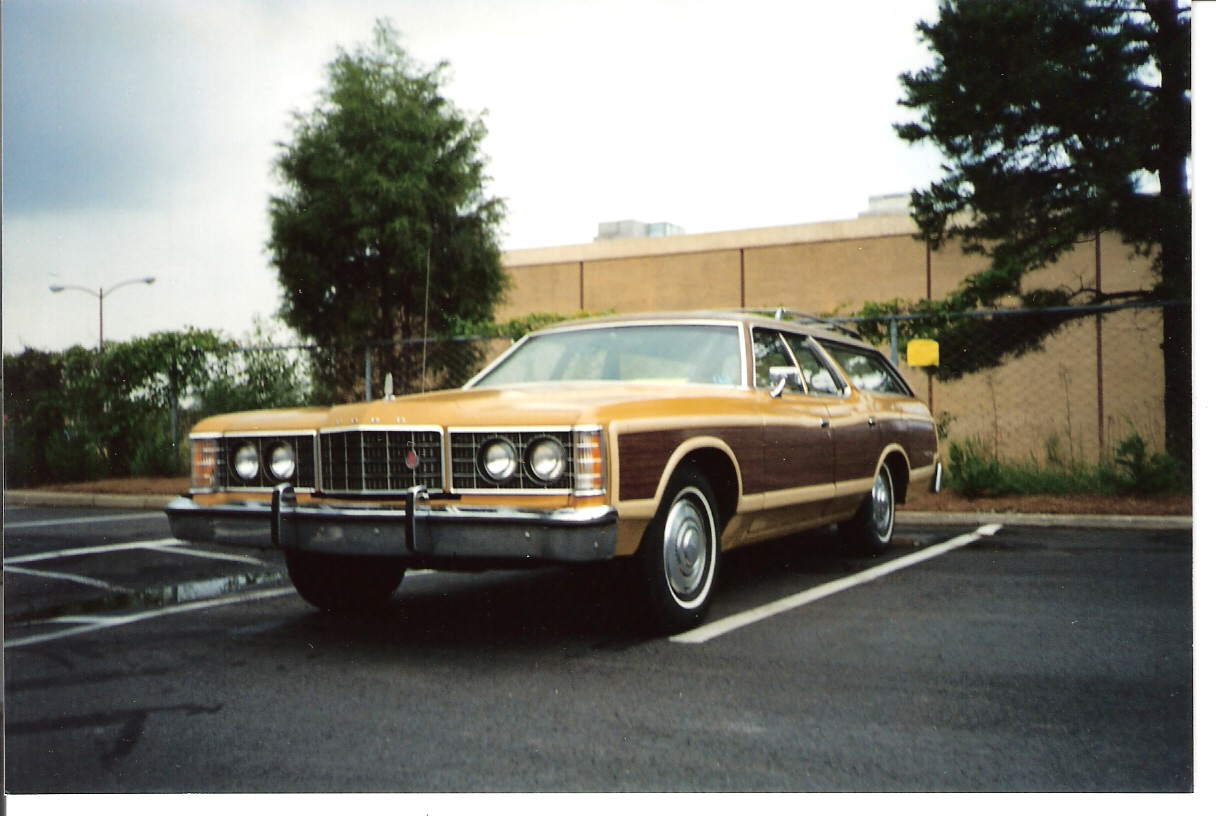
- 1973 Ford LTD Country Squire

Overview
- Model years: 1969–1978
- Assembly: Hazelwood, Missouri (St. Louis Assembly Plant); Pico Rivera, California (Los Angeles Assembly); Hapeville, Georgia (Atlanta Assembly)

Body and chassis
- Body style: 4-door station wagon
- Chassis: body-on-frame
- Related: Mercury Colony Park; Ford LTD; Ford Galaxie; Ford Custom

Powertrain
- Engine: 302 cu in (4.9 L) Windsor V8; 351 cu in (5.8 L) Windsor V8; 390 cu in (6.4 L) FE V8; 429 cu in (7.0 L) 385 V8; 400 cu in (6.6 L) Cleveland V8; 460 cu in (7.5 L) 385 V8; 351 cu in (5.8 L) 351M/351 Cleveland V8
- Transmission: 3-speed manual 3-speed FMX automatic 3-speed Ford C6 automatic

Dimensions
- Wheelbase: 121.0 in (3,073 mm)
- Length: 225.7 in (5,733 mm) (1973-1978)

For the 1969 model year, the full-size Ford model line underwent a complete redesign, increasing in wheelbase from 119 inches to 121 inches. In a consolidation of its branding, Ford station wagons and sedans were no longer distinct model lines. After adding LTD hood badging in 1968, the Country Squire was added to the model range for 1969, slotted above the (Galaxie) Country Sedan and (Custom 500) Ranch Wagon. Starting with 1969 the Big Six six-cylinder was no longer offered on the Country Squire while it continued with the Country Sedan and Ranch Wagon. The 1969 ten-passenger version was listed at US$3,721 ($32,668 in 2025 dollars).

=== 1969–1972 ===
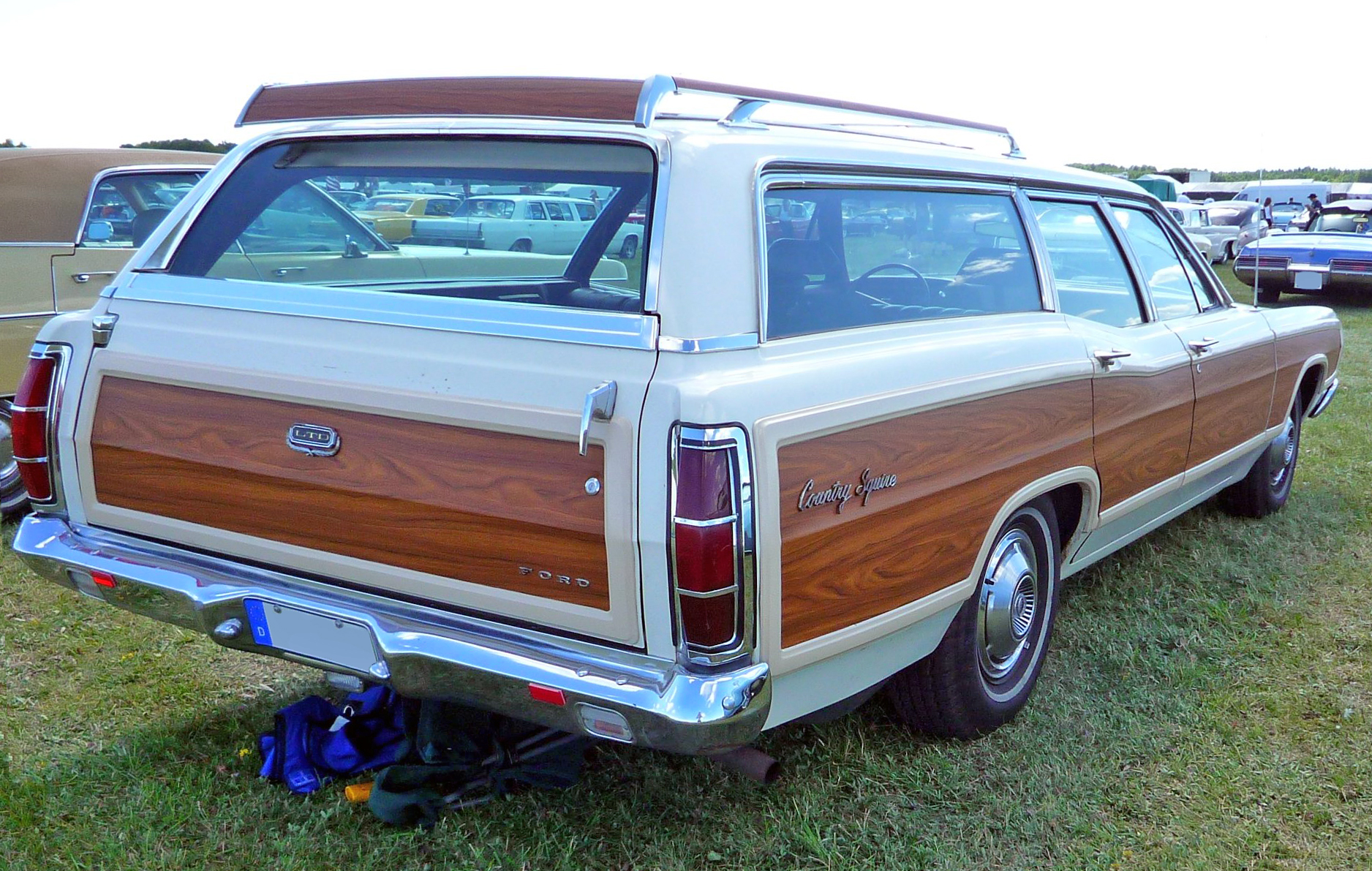
1970 Ford LTD Country Squire

For the 1969 model year, a new generation of Ford and Mercury cars made their debut; station wagons for both divisions rode on a 121-inch wheelbase shared with the Ford sedan line, a gain of two inches. The "Magic Doorgate" tailgate was updated to a 3-way design: it could now swing down like a tailgate or swing out with the window down or up (the latter was previously not possible).

As part of the LTD line, the Country Squire wore similar interior trim; with the obvious exception of its simulated woodgrain paneling, Country Squires wore the same bodywork from the windshield forward as their LTD sedan counterparts. For the 1970 model year, visible changes were limited to detail changes in bumper and grille trim and lost the divider bar. In 1971, the Country Squire would be given an extensive facelift with only the roof and tailgate carried over from the 1970 model, sharing visual similarities with the 1970 Ford Thunderbird; as with the LTD, it would lose its hidden headlamps in the grille while the feature was added to the Mercury Colony Park due to its luxurious appearance shared with the 1969 Lincoln Continental.

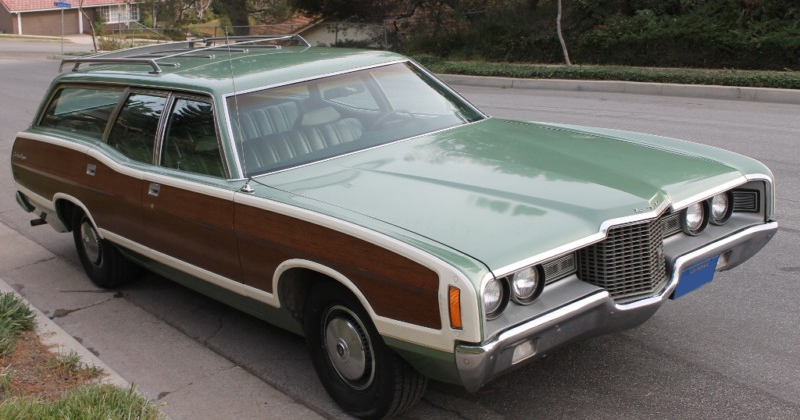
1971 Ford LTD Country Squire

Initially, the standard engine was a 302 cubic-inch V8, replaced by a 351 cubic-inch V8 midway through the 1969 model year. As with its LTD counterpart, the 390 and 429 V8 engines were options. In 1971, the 390 V8 was replaced by a 402 cubic-inch V8 (though sold as a 400). For a variety of reasons, 1972 saw a major decrease in powertrain output. That year, gross horsepower was replaced by SAE net horsepower. The addition of emissions controls and the adoption of unleaded fuel required lowered compression ratios and retarded ignition timing. In one example, the range-topping 429 V8 would see its output drop from 365 hp to 212 hp from 1971 to 1972. In 1972, the 429 was joined by a 224-hp 460 cubic-inch V8 seen previously in the Lincoln lineup.

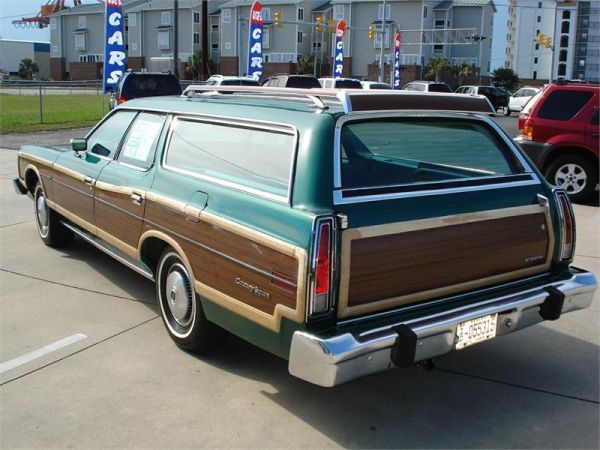
1978 Ford LTD Country Squire rear view

=== Sales ===
Seventh-generation Country Squire production (6- and 10 passenger combined)
| Year | Sales |
|---|---|
| 1969 | 129,235 |
| 1970 | 108,914 |
| 1971 | 130,644 |
| 1972 | 121,419 |

=== 1973–1978 ===
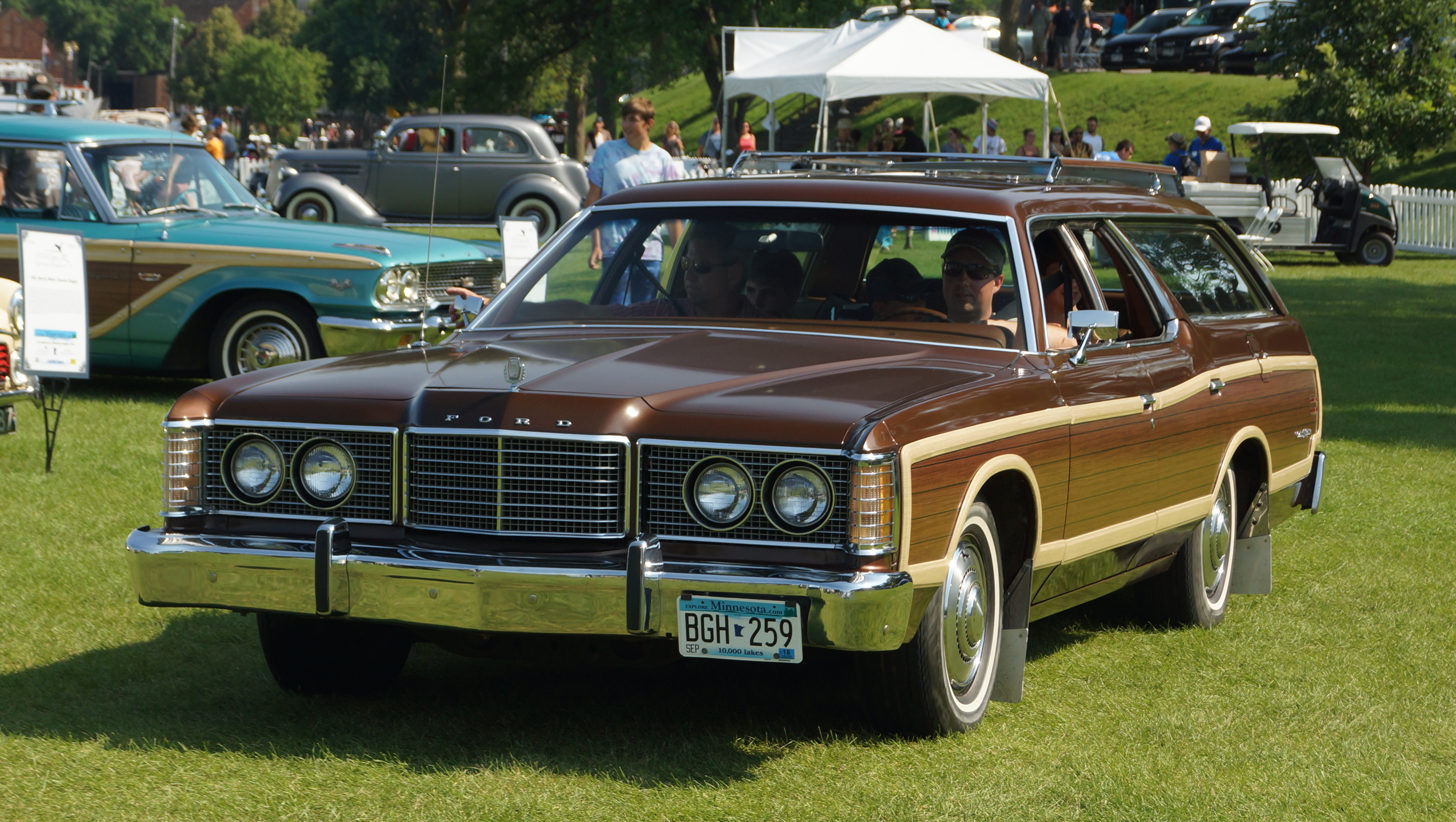
1974 Ford LTD Country Squire

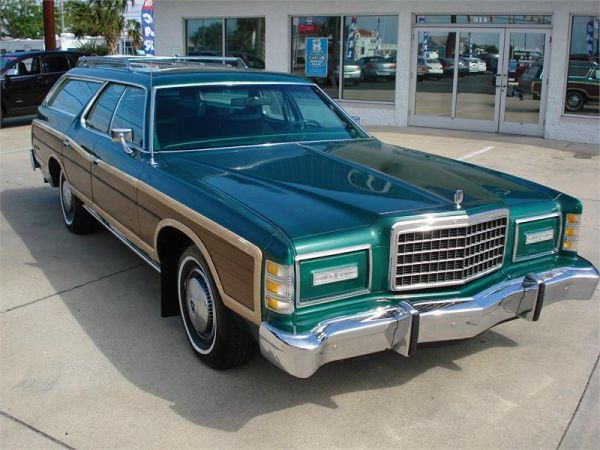
1978 Ford LTD Country Squire

For the 1973 model year, the Ford full-size car line was given a major update. While still built on the same chassis and 121-inch wheelbase, the addition of 5 mph bumpers would add over six inches in length to the LTD Country Squire by the end of the 1974 model year. These would also be the longest and heaviest station wagons ever produced by Ford. The 1973 ten-passenger was listed at US$4,401 ($31,919 in 2025 dollars).

For 1974, 5-mph bumpers were added to the rear, a transistorized ignition system was introduced, as well as a new hood ornament. In addition, the 429 was dropped, largely replaced by the essentially identical 460 V8.

For 1975, Ford began to pare down its wagon lineup as the Custom 500 Ranch Wagon was relegated exclusively to fleet sales and the Galaxie Country Sedan was discontinued, replaced by a non-woodgrain LTD wagon. To better distinguish the LTD Country Squire, Ford returned hidden headlamps to the model, a feature associated with top-line LTD Landau (and Mercury Marquis) models. In all models, catalytic converters were now standard equipment to comply with emissions regulations.

1975-1978 models were nearly identical except for small differences in trim and emblems from year to year. As a move to increase fuel economy, the 351 cubic-inch V8 was reintroduced for 1978.

The standard engine on all other full-size Ford sedans and wagons was the 351 Windsor V8. The Country Squire however, came standard with the Cleveland 400M V8, while the 385-series 429 and 460 V8s were optional. With manual transmissions being dropped from the lineup, the C6 3-speed automatic transmission was now the only transmission option for full-size Fords. The 429 and 460 V8s were a common option due to the especially sluggish performance of the detuned 400 engine that was now struggling to drive the ever-increasing weight of a Country Squire.

Seventh-generation Country Squire production (6- and 10 passenger combined)
| Year | Sales |
|---|---|
| 1973 | 142,933 |
| 1974 | 64,047 |
| 1975 | 41,550 |
| 1976 | 47,379 |
| 1977 | 90,711 |
| 1978 | 71,285 |

== Eighth generation (1979–1991) ==
Eighth generation (Panther)
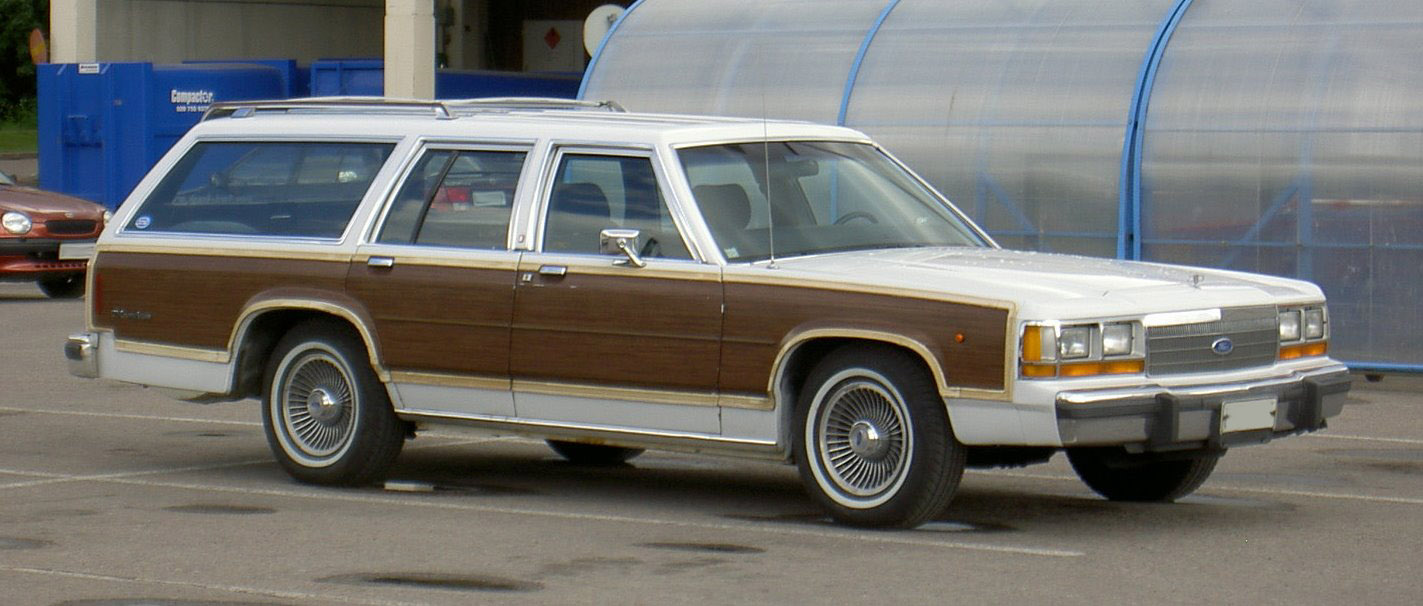
- 1988–1989 Ford LTD Crown Victoria Country Squire

Overview
- Production: 1979–December 1990; 217,152 produced
- Assembly: Hazelwood, Missouri (St. Louis Assembly); St. Thomas, Ontario, Canada (St. Thomas Assembly)

Body and chassis
- Body style: 4-door station wagon
- Platform: Ford Panther platform
- Chassis: body-on-frame
- Related: Ford LTD; Ford LTD Crown Victoria; Lincoln Continental; Lincoln Town Car; Mercury Colony Park; Mercury Grand Marquis; Mercury Marquis

Powertrain
- Engine: 4.9 L (302 cu in) 5.0 Windsor V8; 5.8 L (351 cu in) 351 Windsor V8
- Transmission: 4-speed AOD automatic (1980–1990)

Dimensions
- Wheelbase: 114.3 in (2,903 mm)
- Length: 1979–1987 215.7 in (5,479 mm) 1988–1990 216 in (5,486 mm)
- Width: 79.3 in (2,014 mm)
- Height: 56.5 in (1,435 mm)
- Curb weight: 4,032 lb (1,829 kg)

For 1979, Ford downsized its full-size car lines. Eleven inches shorter and nearly 1,000 lb (450 kg) lighter than its 1978 predecessor, the redesigned Country Squire retained its 8-passenger seating capability with only slightly reduced cargo capacity. While retaining a V8 engine, the Country Squire shifted from the 400 and 460 V8 to the 302 cu in (4.9 L) and 351 cu in (5.8 L) Windsor V8s, sharing engines with the Ford Granada. When this generation of station wagon was introduced, the wheelbase was 1 in (25 mm) longer than the intermediate 1962 Ford Fairlane station wagon and was shorter than the 1972 Ford Gran Torino Squire station wagon.

For 1983, as Ford underwent a revision of its full-size model lines, the Country Squire remained in production; as the LTD became the replacement for the mid-size Granada, the Country Squire became the counterpart for the LTD Crown Victoria. In another change, the 4.9L V8 adopted throttle-body fuel injection. For 1986, the V8 was updated again, adopting sequential multi-port fuel injection (identified by a large EFI 5.0-badged intake above the engine).

For 1988, the Country Squire received its first external updates since 1979, sharing the front fascia update of its sedan counterpart; new front seats received larger head restraints. For 1990, the dashboard received its first major update (since 1979) with the addition of a driver-side airbag; the outboard rear seats received 3-point seatbelts. For 1991, the front turn signal/parking lamp lenses were changed from amber to clear.

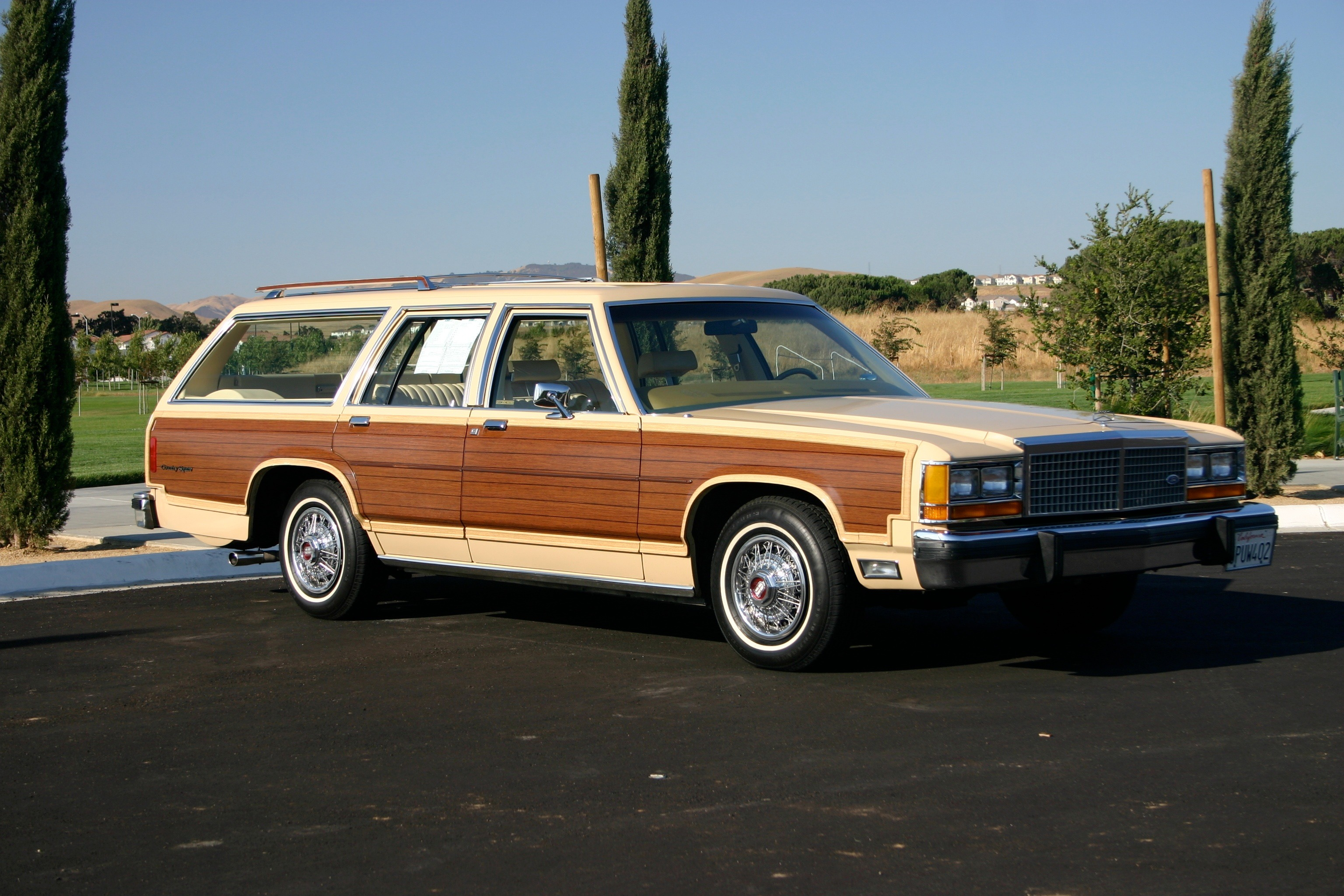
1982 Ford Country Squire

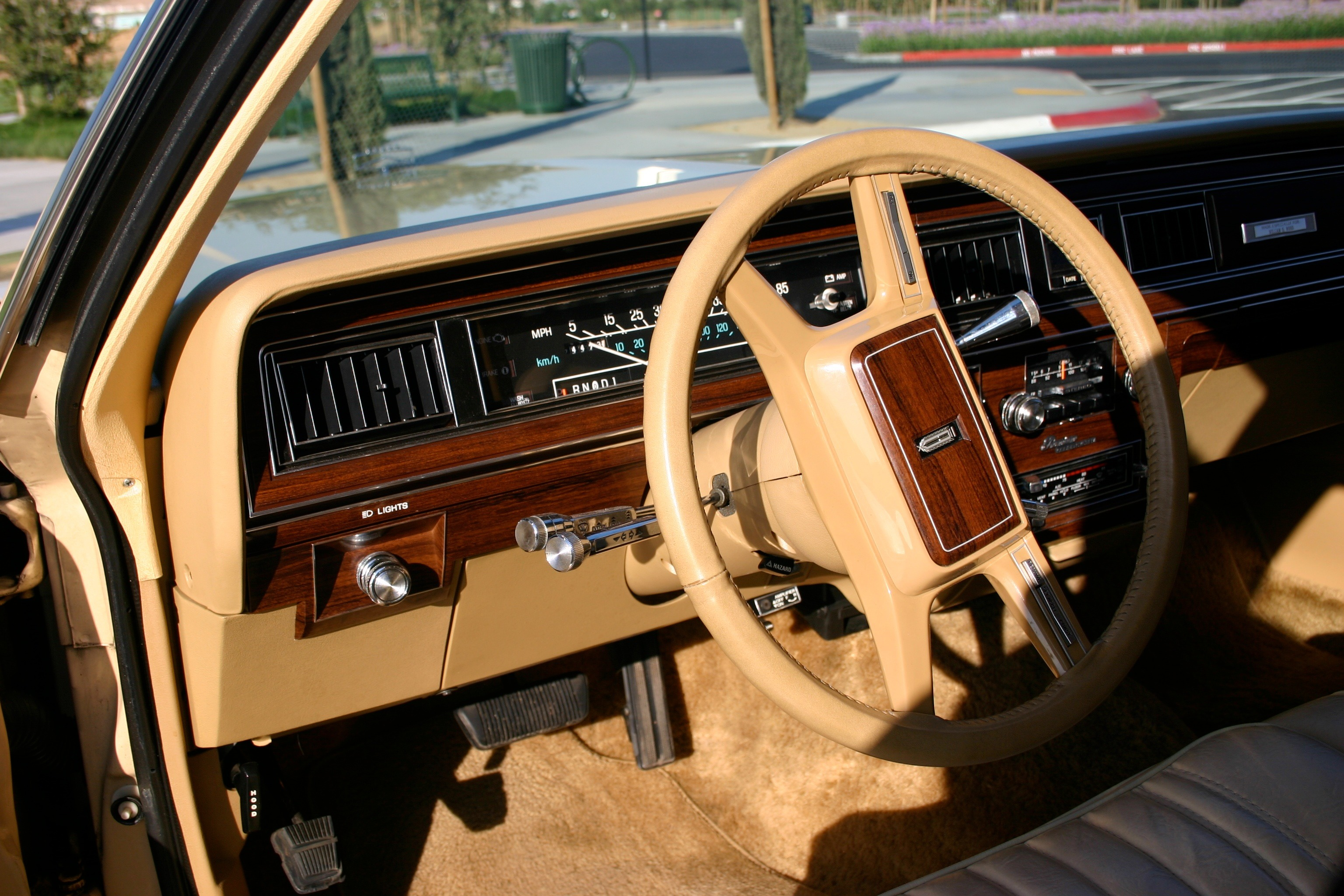
1982 Ford Country Squire dashboard

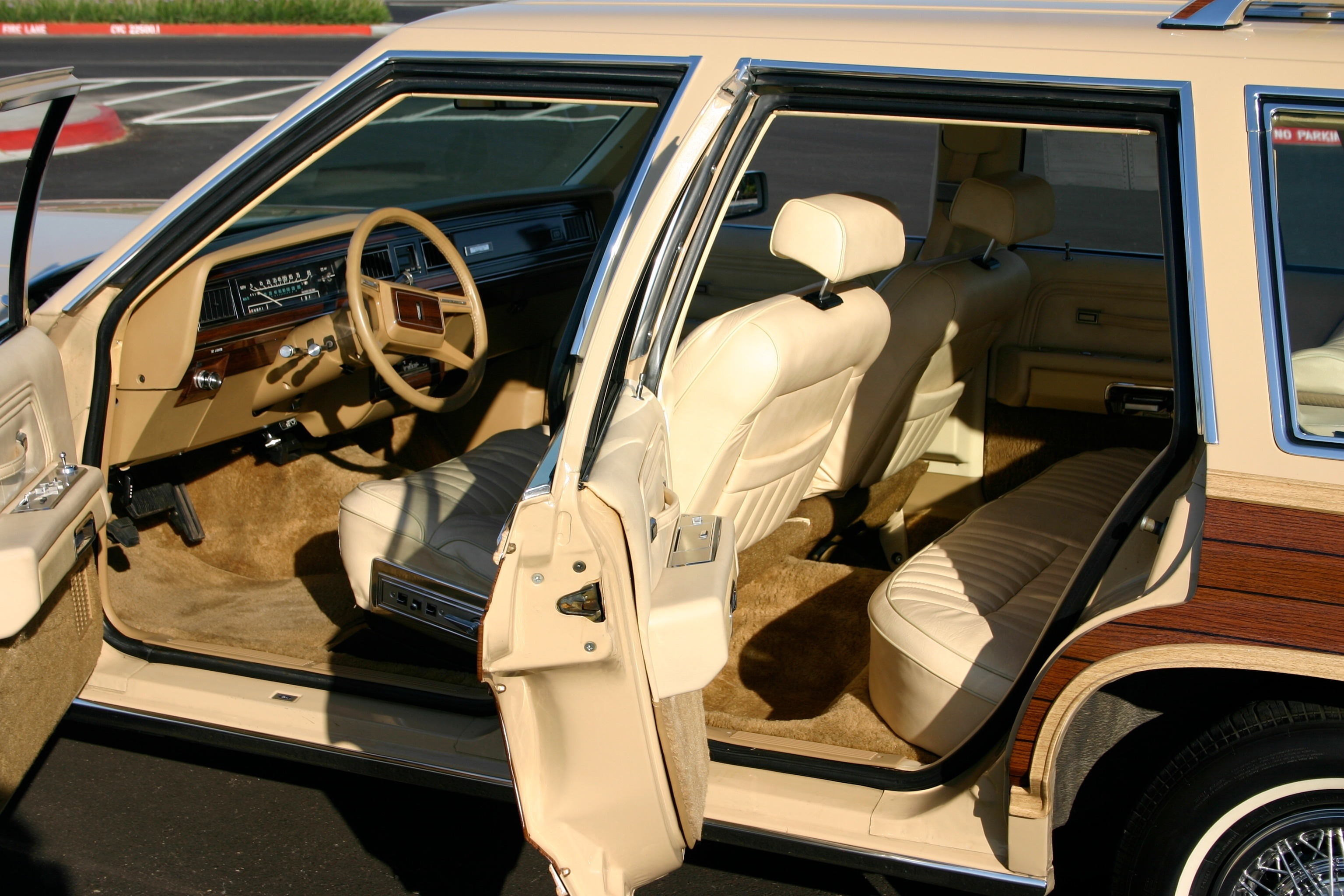
1982 Ford Country Squire, front and rear seats (outside view)

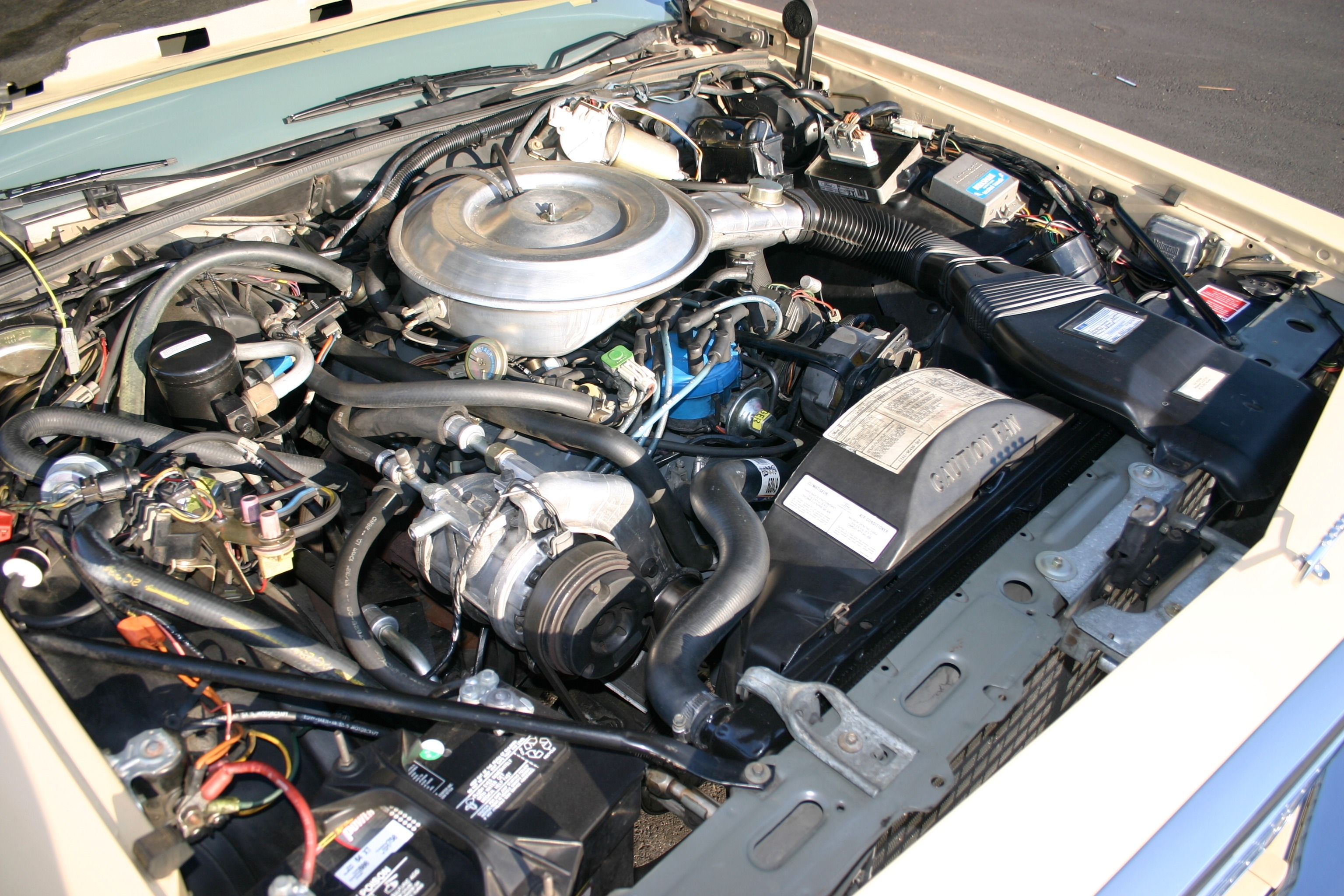
Ford 4.9L Windsor V8 (2-bbl 7200VV carburetor)

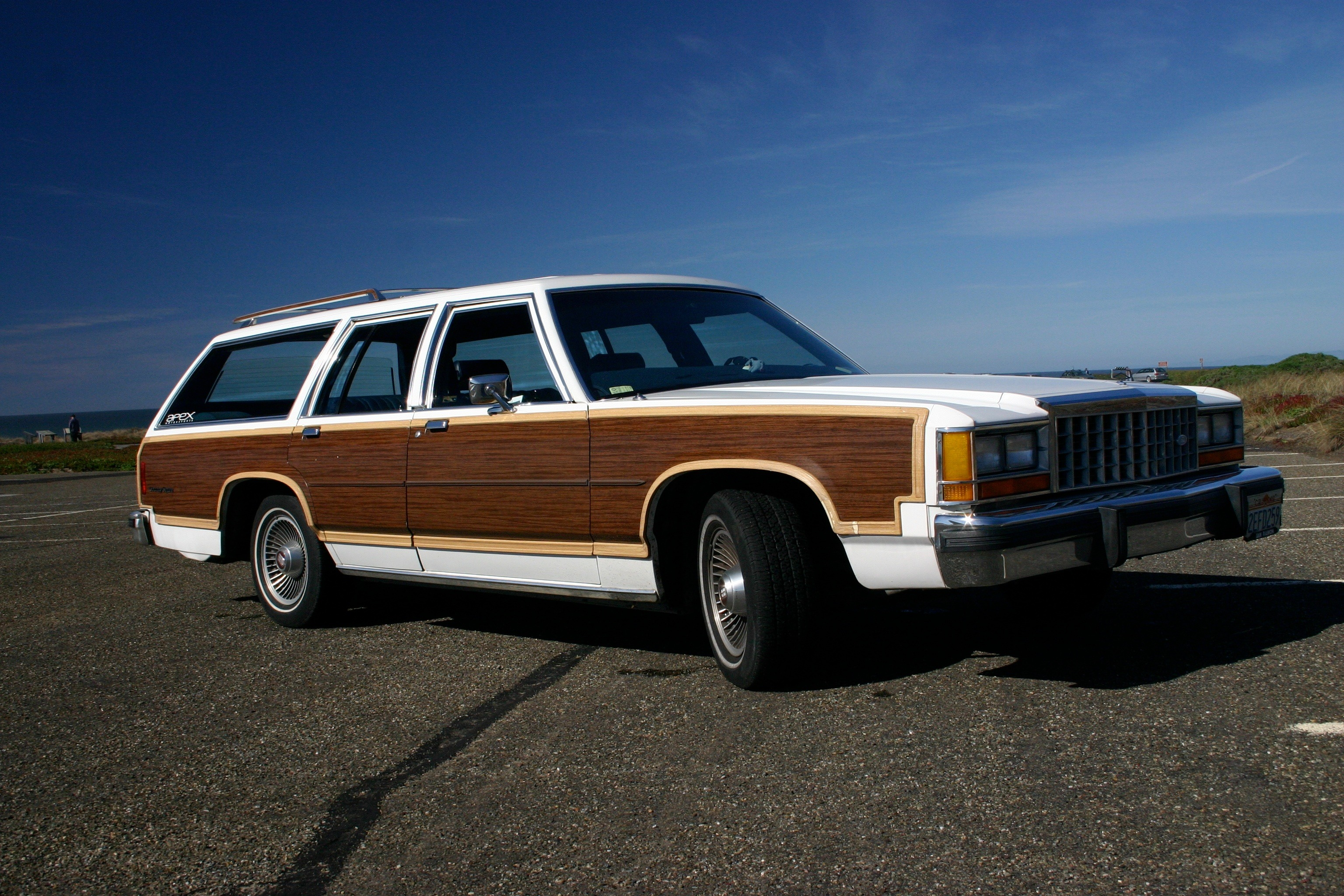
1987 Ford LTD Country Squire

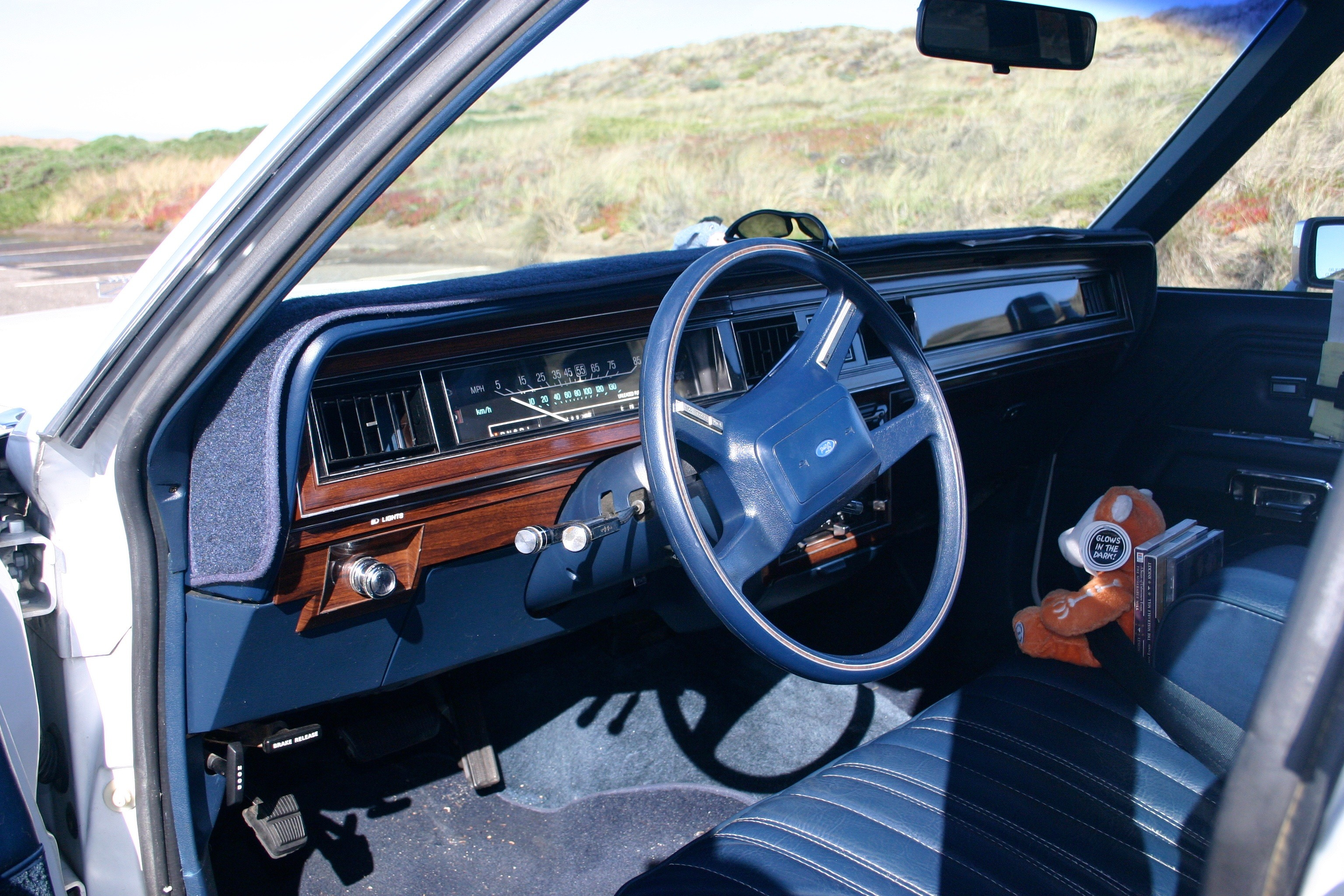
1987 Ford Country Squire dashboard

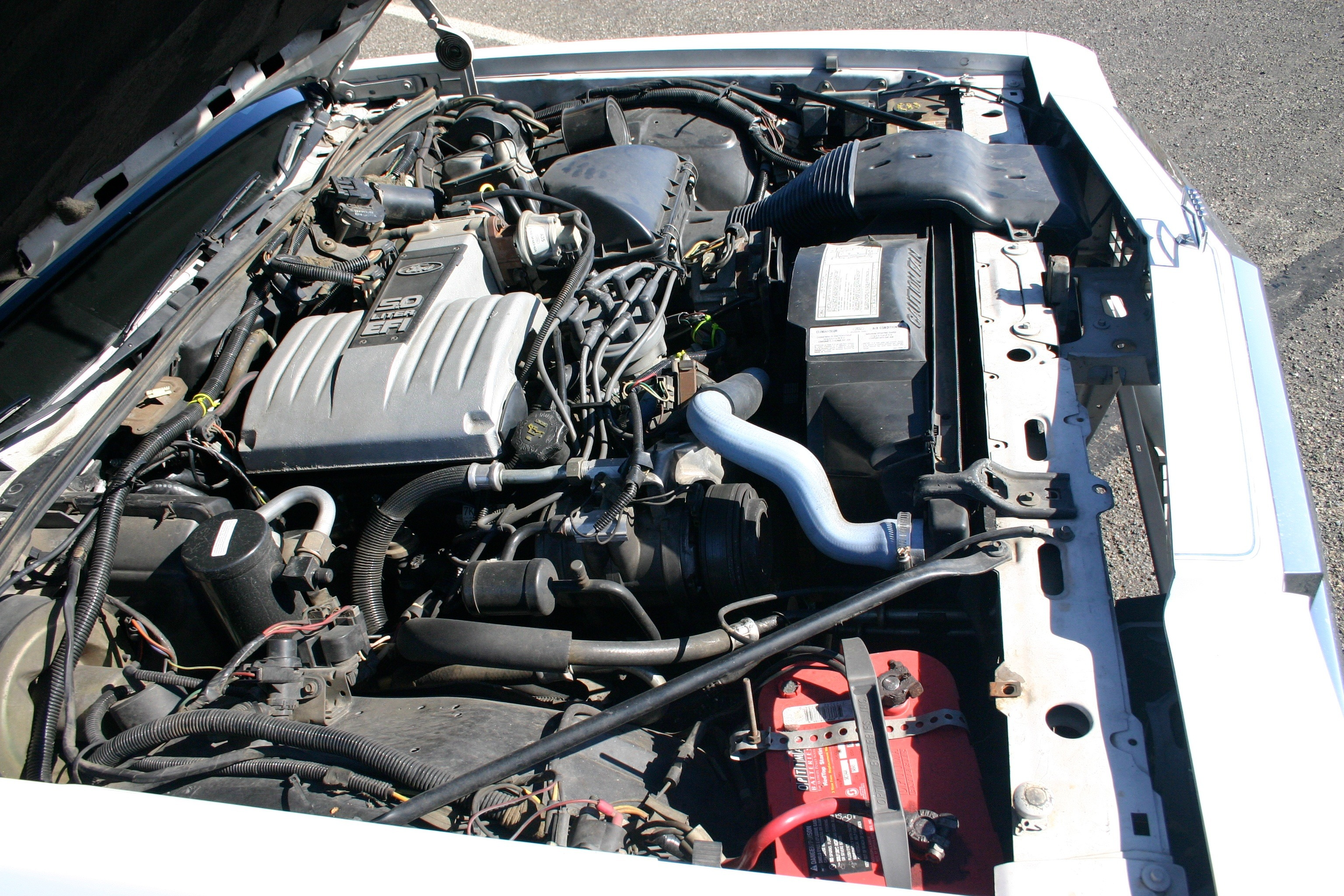
Ford 4.9L Windsor V8 (multiport fuel injection)

=== Discontinuation ===
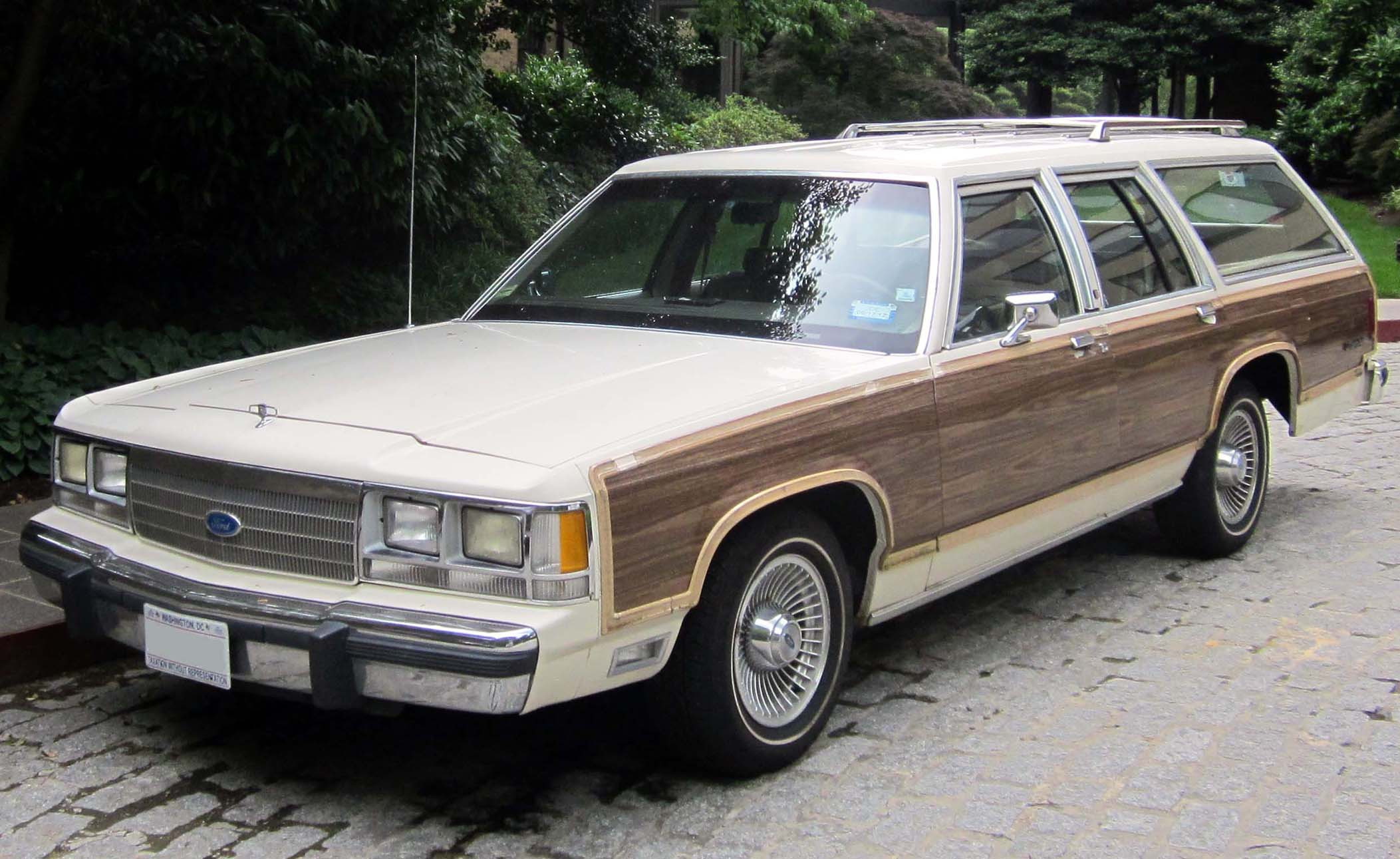
1991 Ford Country Squire LX

During the mid-1980s, sales of full-size station wagons began to decline, following the introduction of the Chrysler minivans and the Ford Aerostar. By 1991, the Country Squire was the slowest-selling Ford vehicle in North America, with less than 4,000 produced. Production of the 1991 model ceased in December 1990.

For 1992, as Ford redesigned its Ford and Mercury full-size vehicles, the station wagon body style was not included in the redesign, although there is published photographic evidence that a full-size clay model for a 1992 Country Sedan was made in 1988. General Motors redesigned its B-platform station wagons for 1991, which were poorly received in the marketplace.

At Ford, the role of the 8-passenger station wagon was passed onto the Ford Taurus/Mercury Sable; redesigned alongside the Crown Victoria for 1992, the Ford Taurus became the best-selling car in the United States. Functionally, the role of the family towing vehicle in the Ford product line was split between the Aerostar (and the larger Ford Club Wagon) as well as the then-new Ford Explorer (as buyers began to shift towards SUVs).

1979–1991 production figures
| Year | 1979 | 1980 | 1981 | 1982 | 1983 | 1984 | 1985 | 1986 | 1987 | 1988 | 1989 | 1990 | 1991 | Total |
| Units† | LTD Country Squire: 29,932 | LTD Country Squire: 9,868 | LTD Country Squire: 9,443 | LTD Country Squire: 9,626 | 20,343 | 30,803 | 30,825 | 20,164 | 17,562 | 14,940 | 13,362 | 6,419 | 3,865 | 221,017 |
| Units† | Non-woodgrain: 37,955 | Non-woodgrain: 11,718 | Non-woodgrain: 10,554 | Non-woodgrain: 9,294 | 20,343 | 30,803 | 30,825 | 20,164 | 17,562 | 14,940 | 13,362 | 6,419 | 3,865 | 221,017 |

†non-woodgrain LTD Crown Victoria and Country Squire wagons counted as one total starting in 1983
††286,673 units total, including non-woodgrain wagons produced 1979–1982

== Unique options and features ==
With certain versions of the Country Squire, an AM/FM-Cassette stereo with a combined and fully integrated Citizens' Band (CB) two-way radio, and replacement dual-purpose automatic antenna (with only one visible difference; the aerial mast was a larger diameter, and black-band at approximately half-way up). The radio would then have the appearance of an original equipment, factory radio.

Other options included opposing side-facing rear seats, which could be folded down to make a durable cargo surface. Available for use with the side-facing rear seats was a folding table with an integrated magnetic checkers board. Magnets under the plastic checker pieces would keep them from sliding on the board while the vehicle was in motion.

Behind a rear fender well was a hidden, lockable compartment, not visible when the rear seatback was in the upright position.

GM, Chrysler and AMC would adopt a similar configuration by the end of the 1960s. An advanced version of this was the 3-way tailgate which permitted opening the door sideways with the window up. Otherwise, the tailgate could be hinged downwards only after operating the lock which was accessible from the outside only with the window lowered.
