= Ford Mainline =

Motor vehicle built by Ford 1952 to 1956

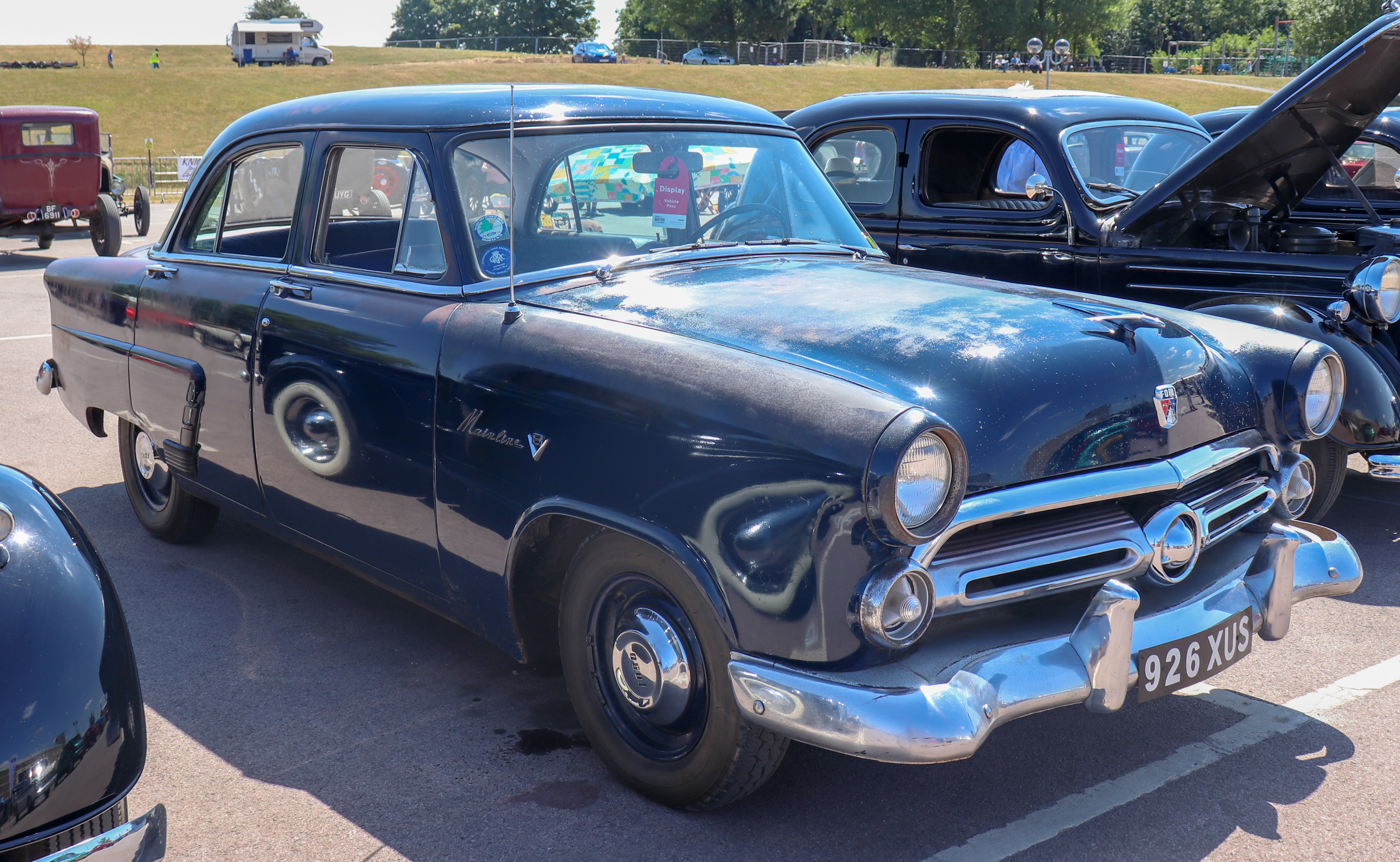
- 1952 Ford Mainline Fordor Sedan

Overview
- Manufacturer: Ford
- Production: 1952–1956
- Assembly: Main plant: United States: Dearborn, MI; Branch assembly Twin Cities, MN; Somerville, MA; Richmond, CA; Norfolk, VA; Memphis, TN; Louisville, KY; Long Beach, CA; Kansas City, MO; Edgewater, NJ; Dallas, TX; Chicago, IL; Chester, PA; Buffalo, NY; Atlanta, GA; Australia: Geelong, Victoria (Ford Australia)

Body and chassis
- Class: Full-size
- Layout: FR layout

Chronology
- Successor: Ford Custom

The Ford Mainline is an automobile which was produced by Ford in the United States in the models years 1952 to 1956. It was introduced as the base trim level of the 1952 Ford range below the Customline and Crestline models. The Mainline retained its position in the redesigned 1955 Ford range but was discontinued for the 1957 model year when the Ford Custom became the new base model.

== Mainline Styles ==
The Mainline was offered in 2-door sedan, 4-door sedan, 2-door coupe and 2-door station wagon body styles. The station wagon was marketed as the Mainline Ranch Wagon until it lost its Mainline tag for the 1955 model year when all Ford wagons were moved to their own series. Mainlines were available with both inline six-cylinder and V8 engines.

=== Gallery ===
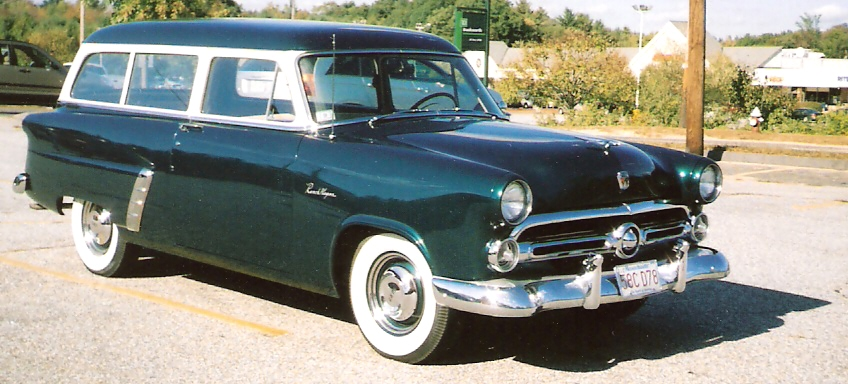
1952 Ford Mainline Ranch Wagon

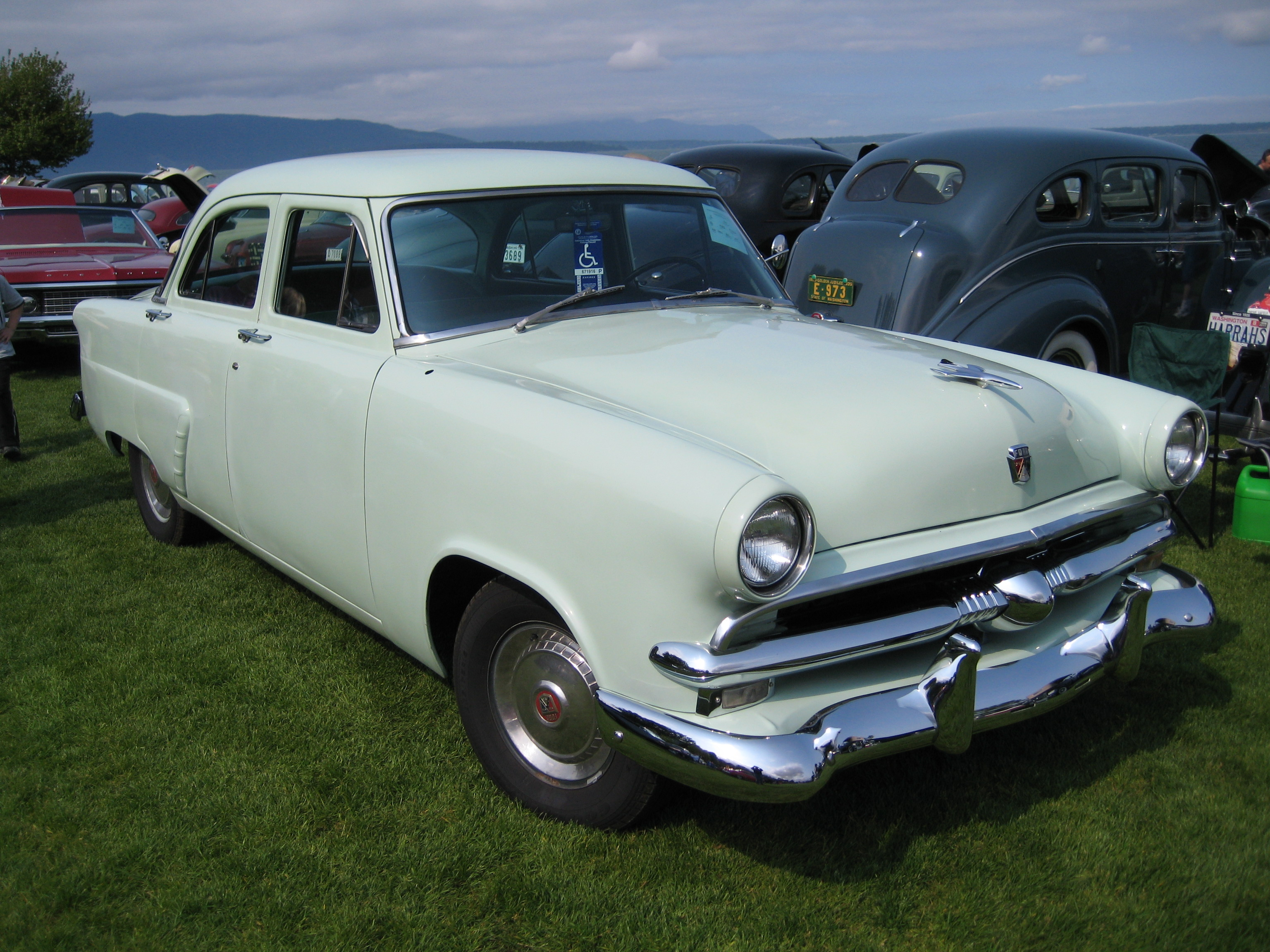
1953 Ford Mainline Fordor Sedan

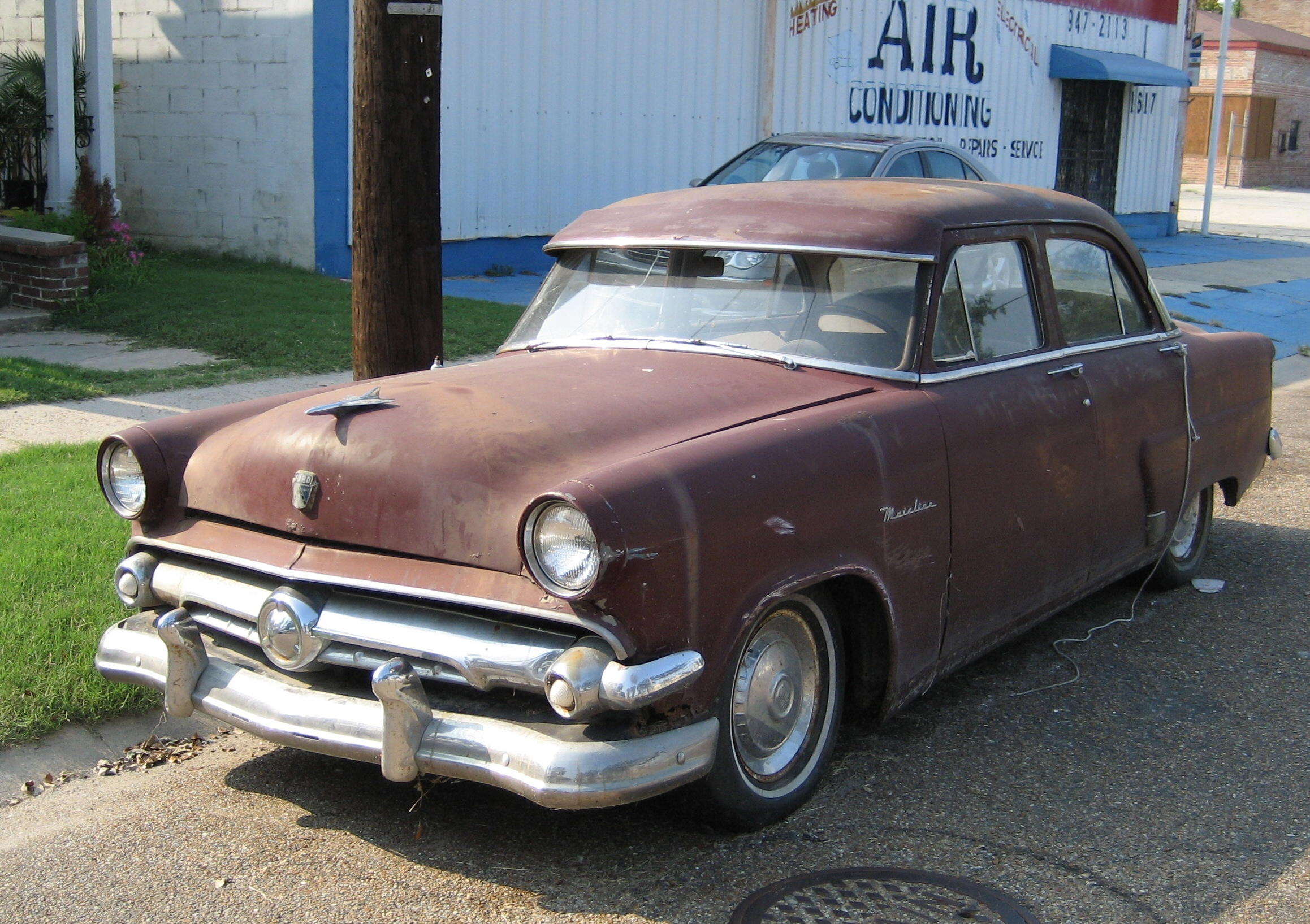
1954 Ford Mainline Fordor Sedan

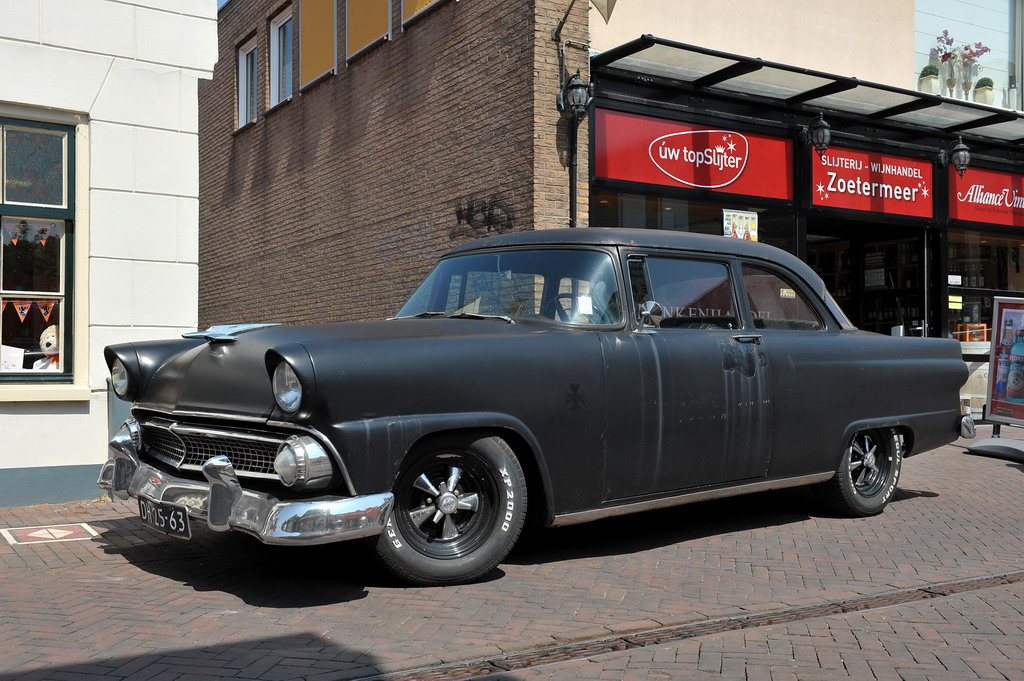
1955 Ford Mainline Tudor Sedan (with after-market wheels)

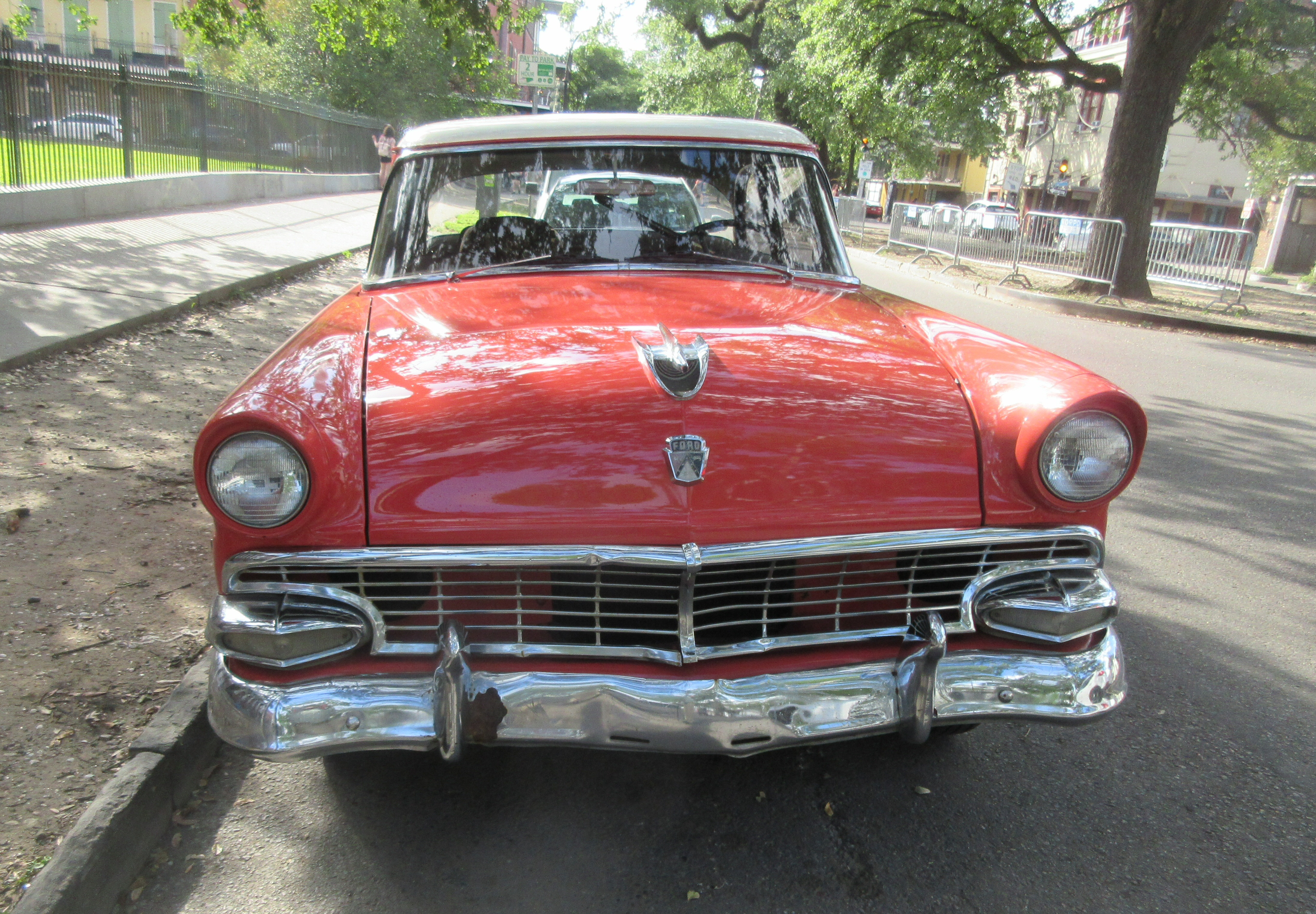
1956 Ford Mainline Tudor Sedan

== Australian Ford Mainline Utility ==
In Australia the Mainline name was applied to a locally developed 2-door coupé utility version of the Ford Customline sedan from 1952. The Mainline utilized an imported station wagon chassis with a large X-member from the Ford Sunliner convertible added for additional load carrying strength. It sold alongside the Australian built Customline sedan, with both given yearly updates until production ceased in 1959. The Mainline's position in Ford Australia's lineup was filled by the first Ford Falcon utility the following year. The Mainline like the Customline was a more expensive premium product in the Australian market. The Mainline Utility was powered by an Australian produced version of the Ford side-valve V8 engine until the introduction of the OHV V8 in the redesigned 1955 series.

=== Gallery ===
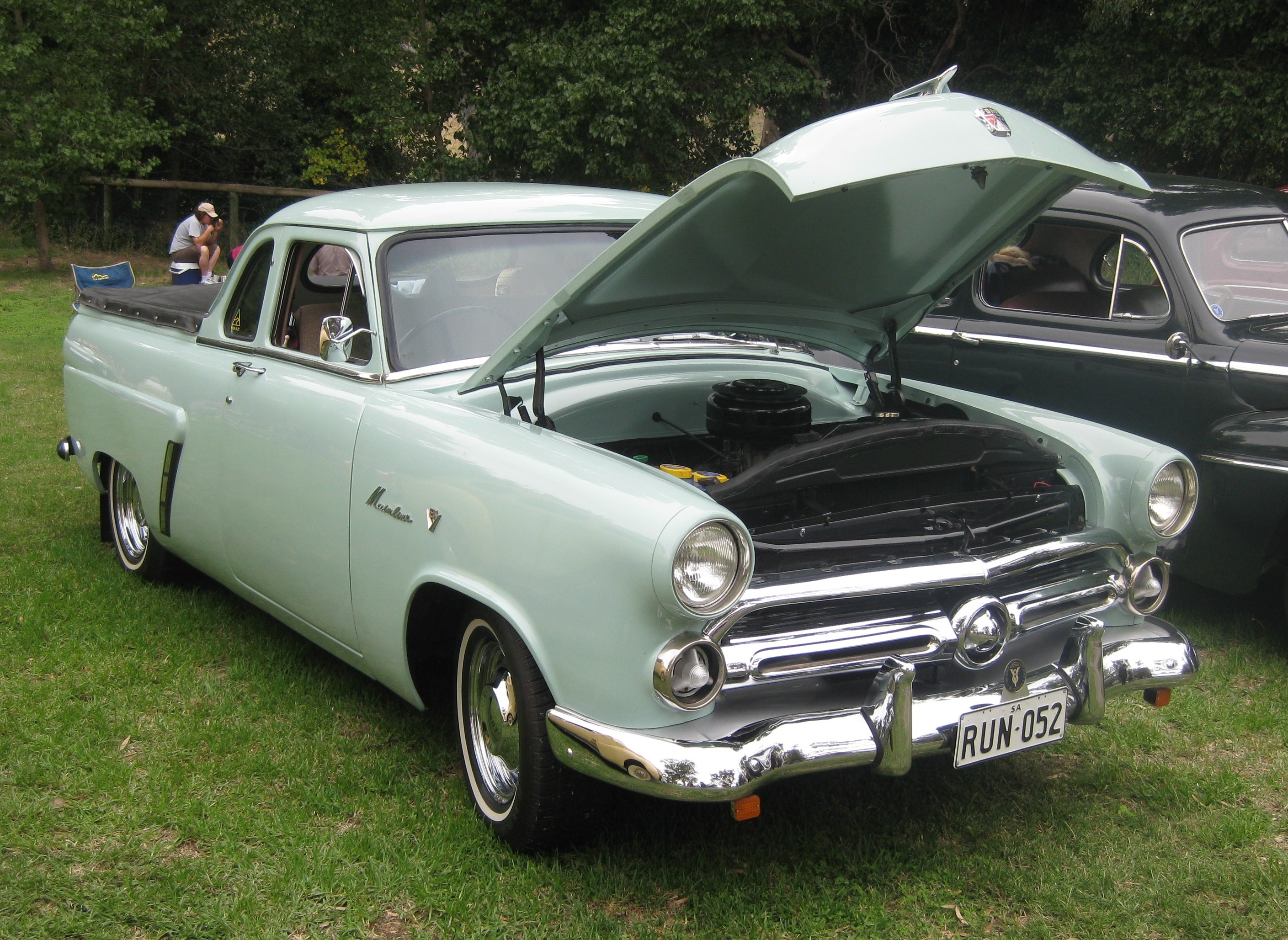
1952 Ford V8 Mainline Coupe Utility

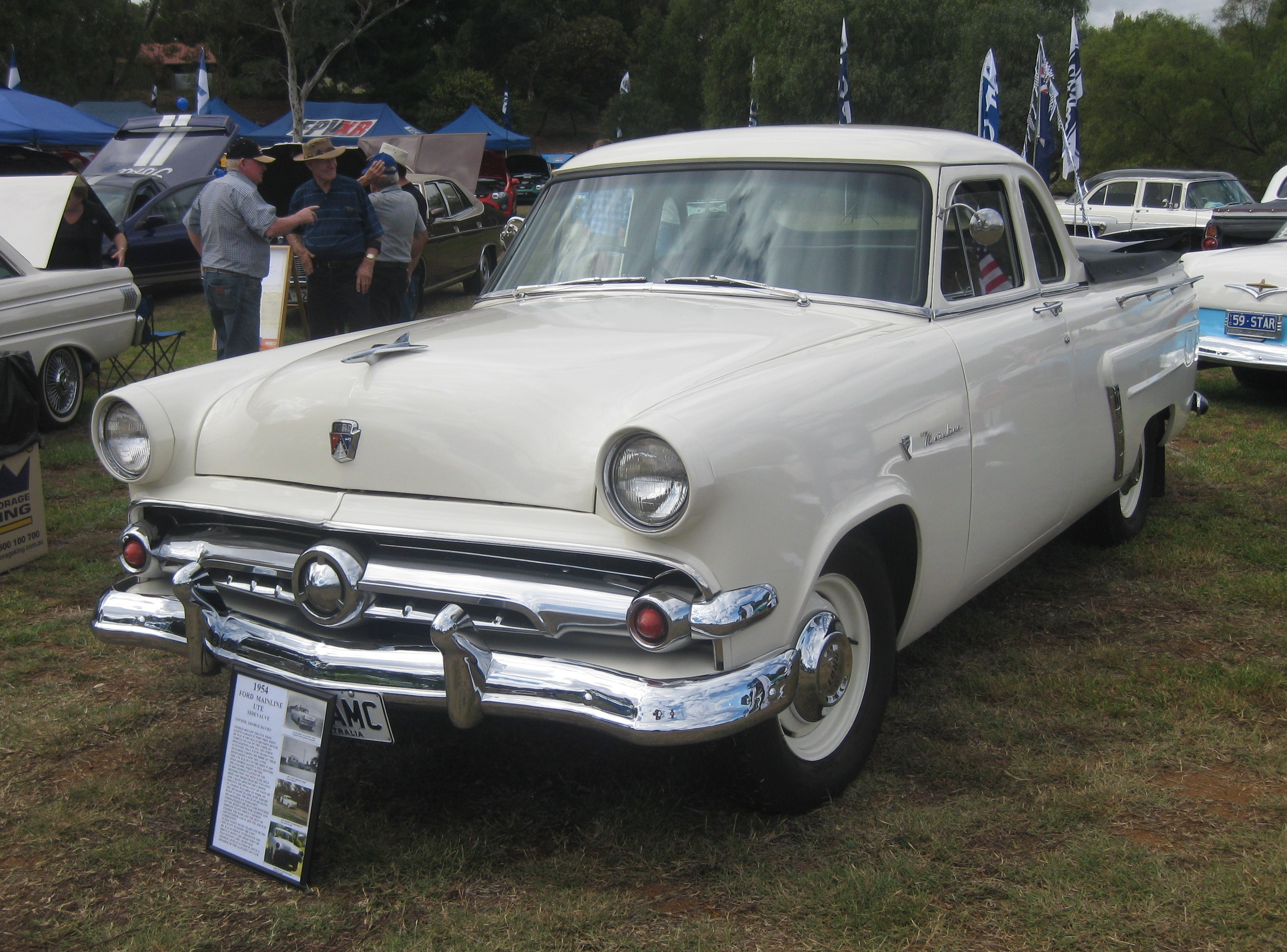
1954 Ford V8 Mainline Coupe Utility

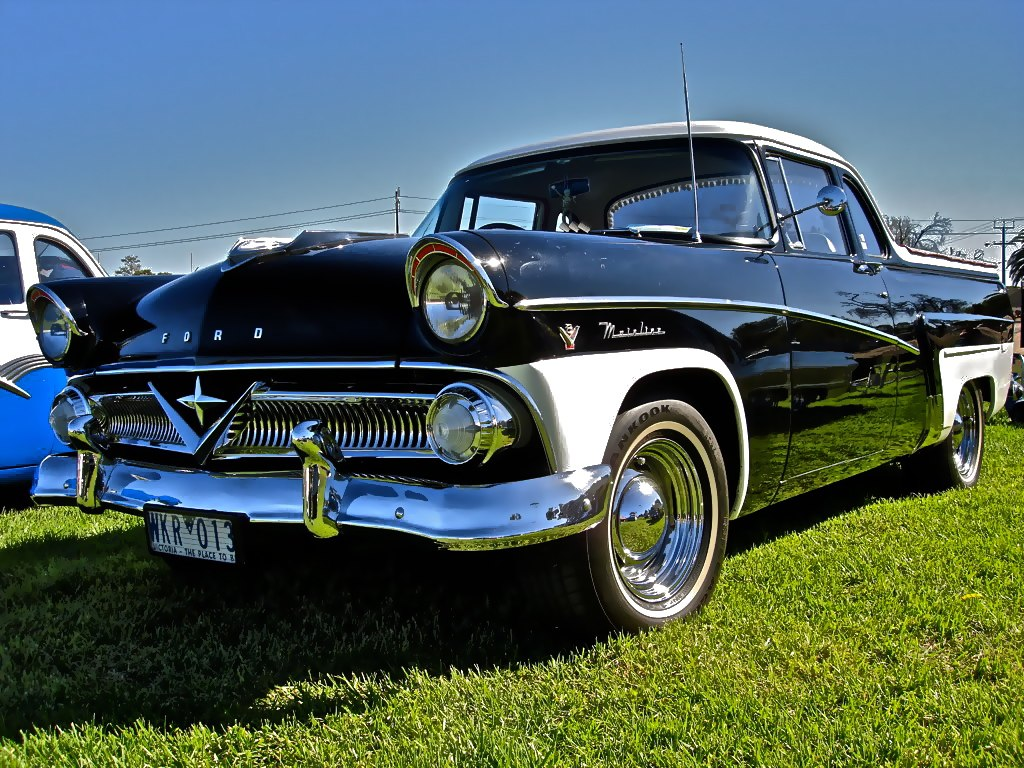
1958 Ford V8 Mainline Coupe Utility

== See also ==
- GAZ-21
