= 1952 Ford =

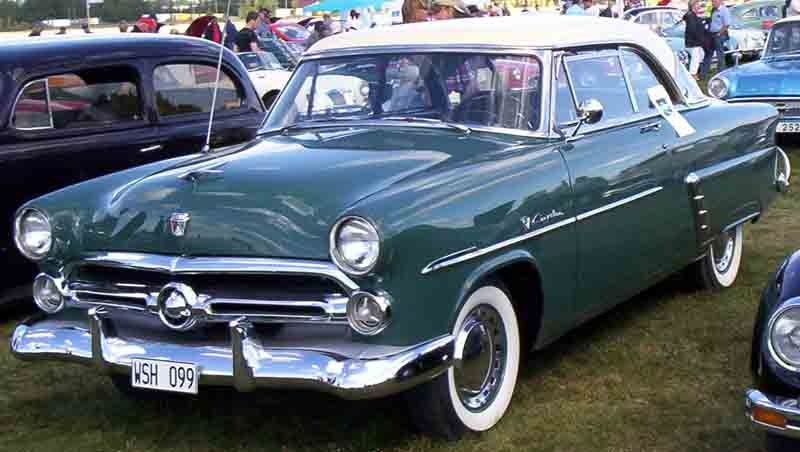
- 1952 Ford Crestline Victoria

Overview
- Manufacturer: Ford
- Also called: Ford Mainline; Ford Customline; Ford Crestline; Ford Courier
- Production: 1952–1954
- Assembly: Main plant: Dearborn, MI; Branch Assembly: Twin Cities, MN; Somerville, MA; Richmond, CA; Norfolk, VA; Memphis, TN; Louisville, KY; Long Beach, CA; Kansas City, MO; Edgewater, NJ; Dallas, TX; Chicago, IL; Chester, PA; Buffalo, NY; Atlanta, GA; Worldwide: Ford Australia

Body and chassis
- Class: Full-size Ford
- Body style: 2-door sedan (Tudor); 4-door sedan (Fordor); 2-door station wagon (Ranch Wagon); 4-door station wagon (Country Sedan, Country Squire); 2-door coupe (Club Coupe); 2-door business coupe 2-door hardtop (Victoria); 2-door hardtop with glassroof (Skyliner); 2-door convertible (Sunliner); 2-door sedan delivery (Courier); 2-door coupe utility (Australia)
- Layout: FR layout
- Related: 1952 Meteor (Canada)

Powertrain
- Engine: 215 CID (3.5 L) OHV I6 239 CID (3.9 L) Flathead V8 239 CID (3.9 L) OHV V8 (1954)
- Transmission: 4-speed sliding-mesh manual Ford-O-Matic 3-speed automatic transmission

Dimensions
- Wheelbase: 115 in (2,921 mm)
- Width: 73.9 in (1,877 mm)
- Height: 62.1 in (1,577 mm)

Chronology
- Predecessor: 1949 Ford
- Successor: 1955 Ford

The Ford line of cars was refreshed for 1952, although remaining similar to the all-new 1949 Fords. This time, curved one-piece windshield glass joined a new "Mileage Maker" straight-6 engine with 101 hp. The 226 CID (3.7 L) L-head straight-6 was replaced by an overhead valve 215 CID (3.5 L) Mileage Maker with 101 hp (75 kW), while the old 239 CID (3.9 L) Flathead V8 remained with 110 hp (82 kW). This design would continue through the 1954 model year, with an updated design offered in 1955.

== 1952 ==
The model lines were again reshuffled, with the base model now called "Mainline" and mid-level called "Customline". The top "Crestline" included the "Sunliner" convertible, and the "Victoria" hardtop, a tradition going back to 1932 with the Ford Victoria 2-door coupe. The station wagon continued with the "Country Squire". Inside was a "flight-style" control panel and new pedals suspended from below the dashboard. A voltmeter, gas gauge, temp. gauge, and oil pressure were standard. The clock and radio were in the center of the dash. The grille sported a single center "bullet" surrounded by a chrome ring as well as "jet intake" corner markers. New trunk hinges were used that would not crush the contents of the trunk. Wheelbase was 115 in (2,921 mm). In these years, an overdrive transmission option was available and they didn't have a voltmeter but had an ammeter.

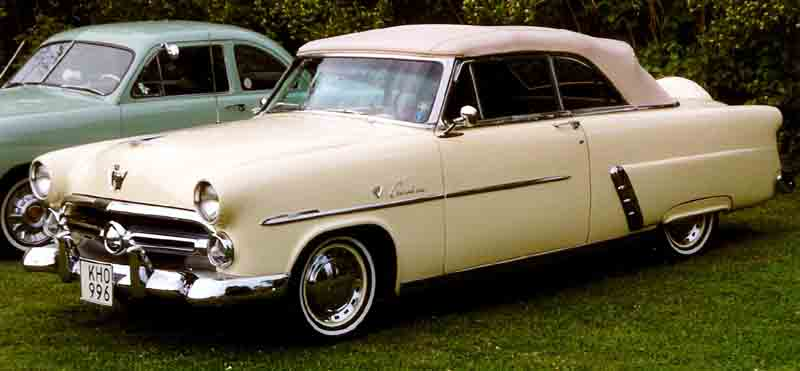
1952 Ford Crestline Sunliner

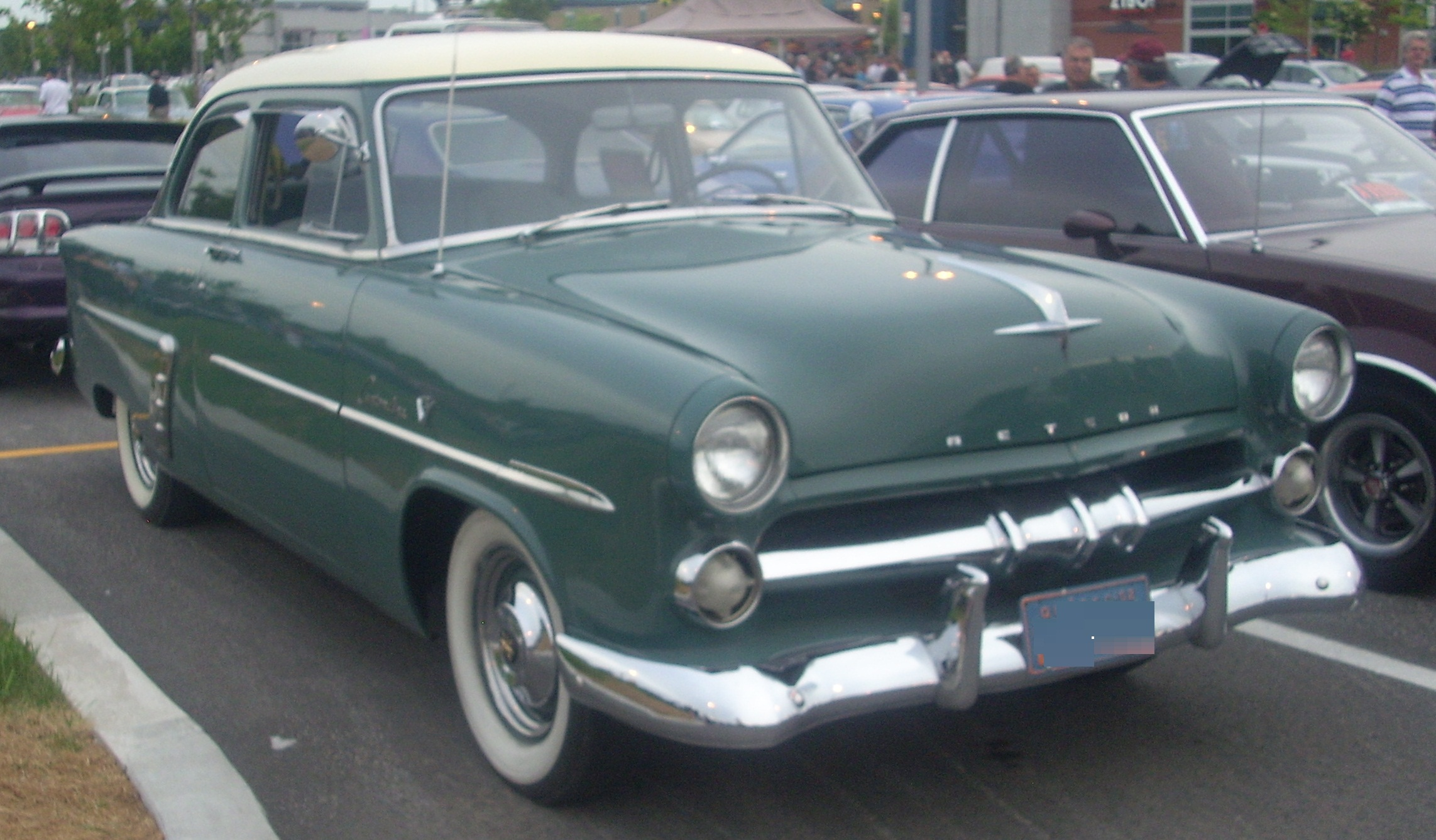
1952 Meteor Customline V8, (Canada)

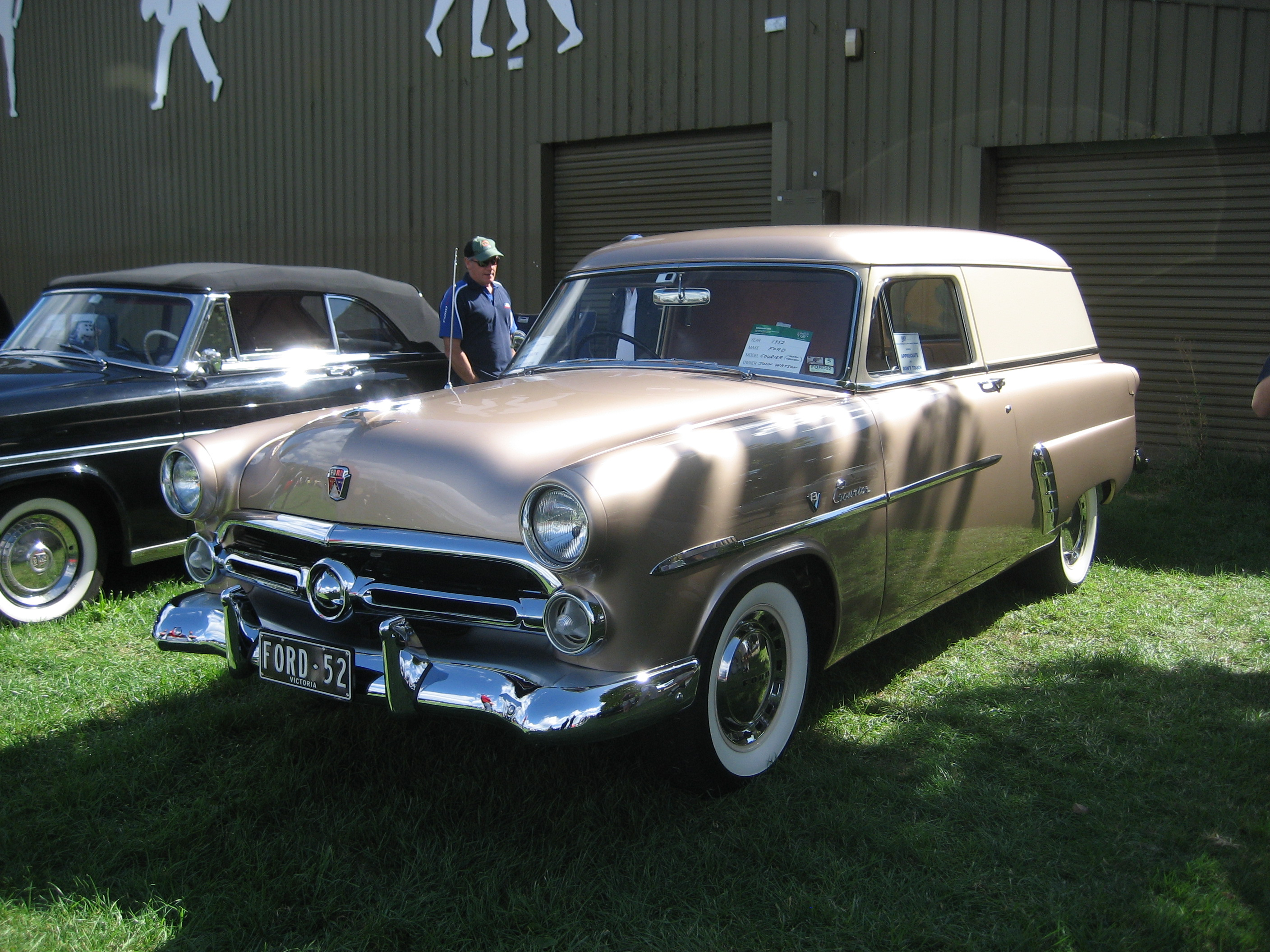
1952 Ford Courier Custom Delivery

== 1953 ==
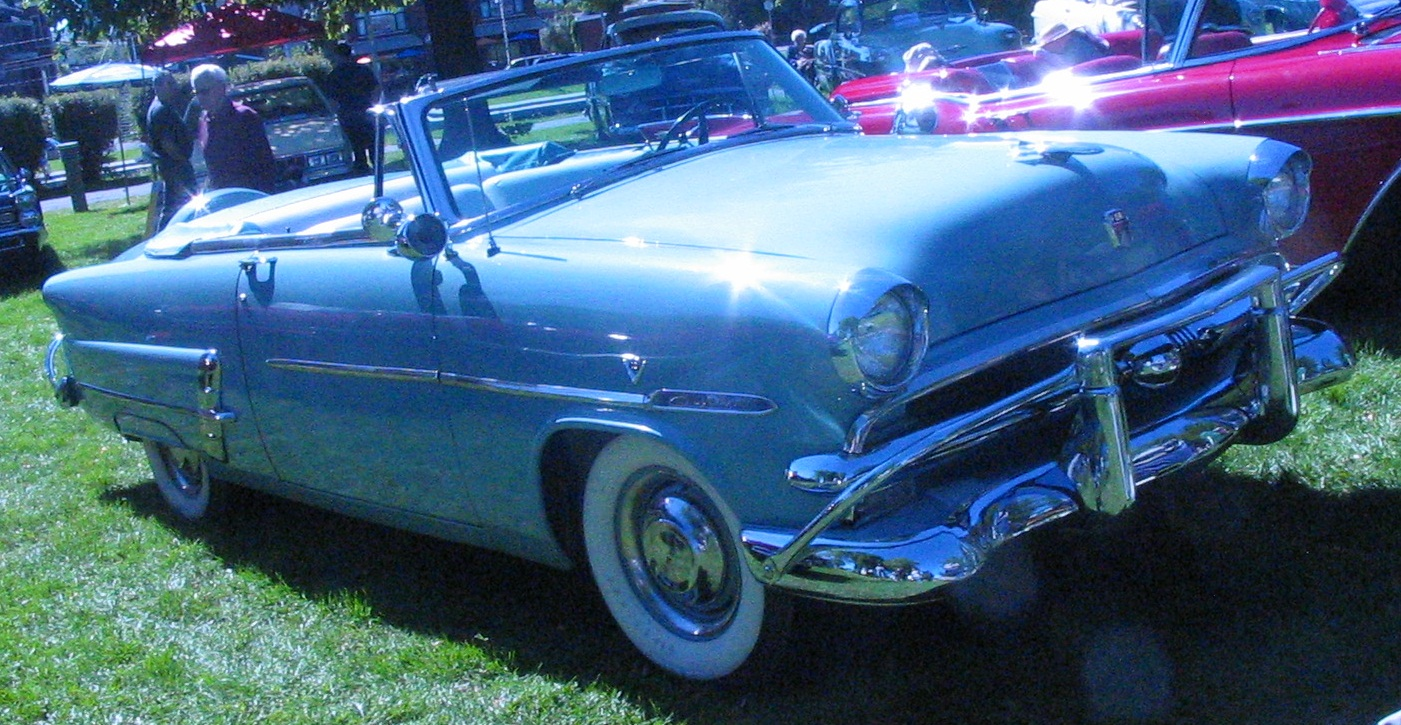
1953 Ford Crestline Sunliner convertible.

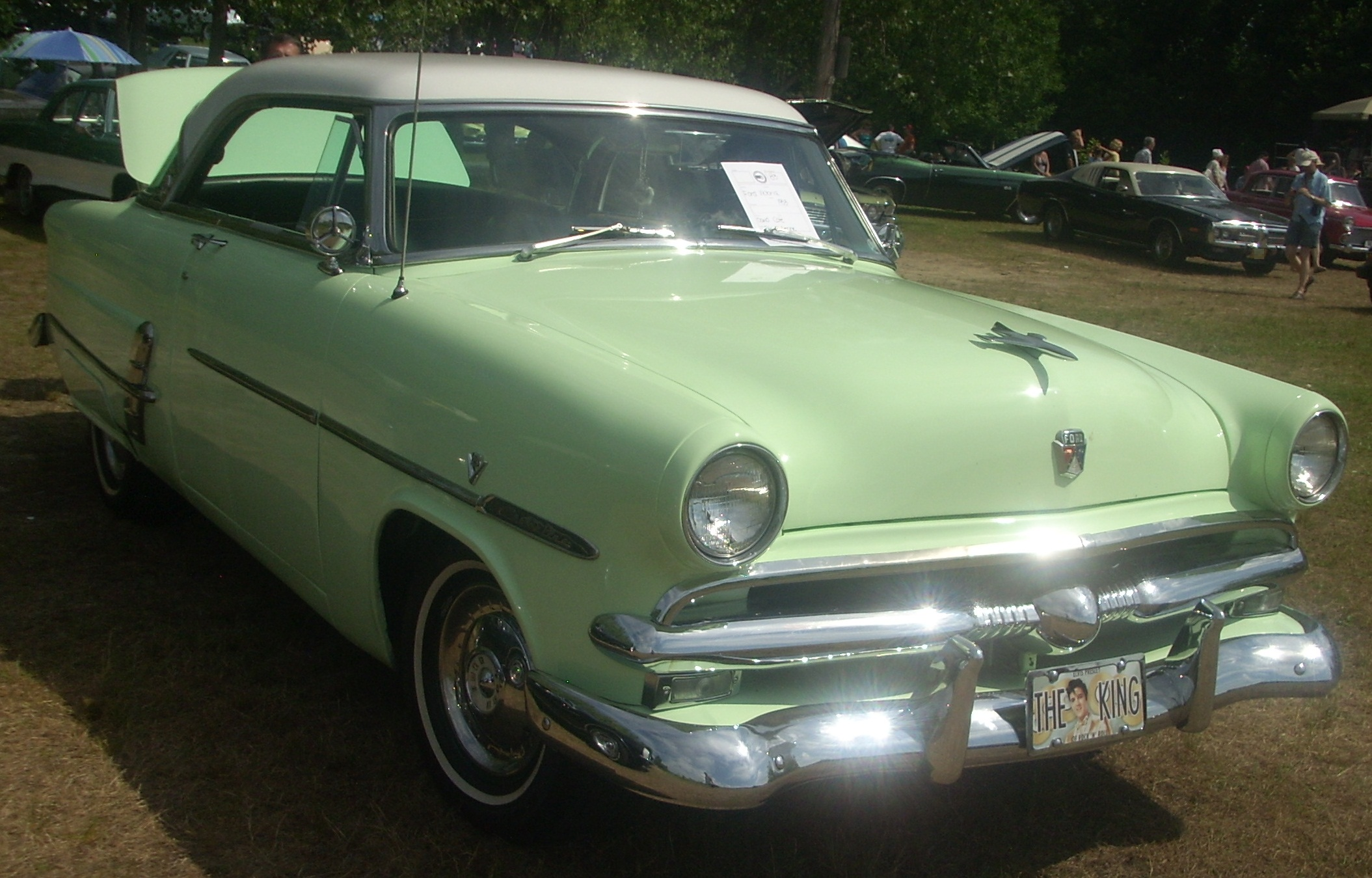
1953 Ford Crestline Victoria

1953 was Ford's 50th anniversary. The big news for 1953 was the availability of power-assisted brakes and steering, which had previously been limited to the Mercury and Lincoln lines. The center grill bullet lost its ring and was now flanked by vertical black stripes, while the corner markers were plain rectangular lights rather than the circular "intakes". All 1953 Fords featured commemorative steering wheels marking the company's 50th anniversary. Mechanical changes included two-inch wider tread, and a k-bar frame with five cross-members. William Clay Ford paced the Indianapolis 500 in a Sunliner convertible with a dummy Continental tire kit (Coronado kit). This was also the last year for real wood trim on the Country Squire wagon. Toward the end of the year, Ford added "Master-Guide" power steering as an option on cars with V8s. Full instrumentation was still used. An unusual service provided by Ford was that the radio preset buttons would already be set to local stations by the dealer. The heater was $74.

== 1954 ==
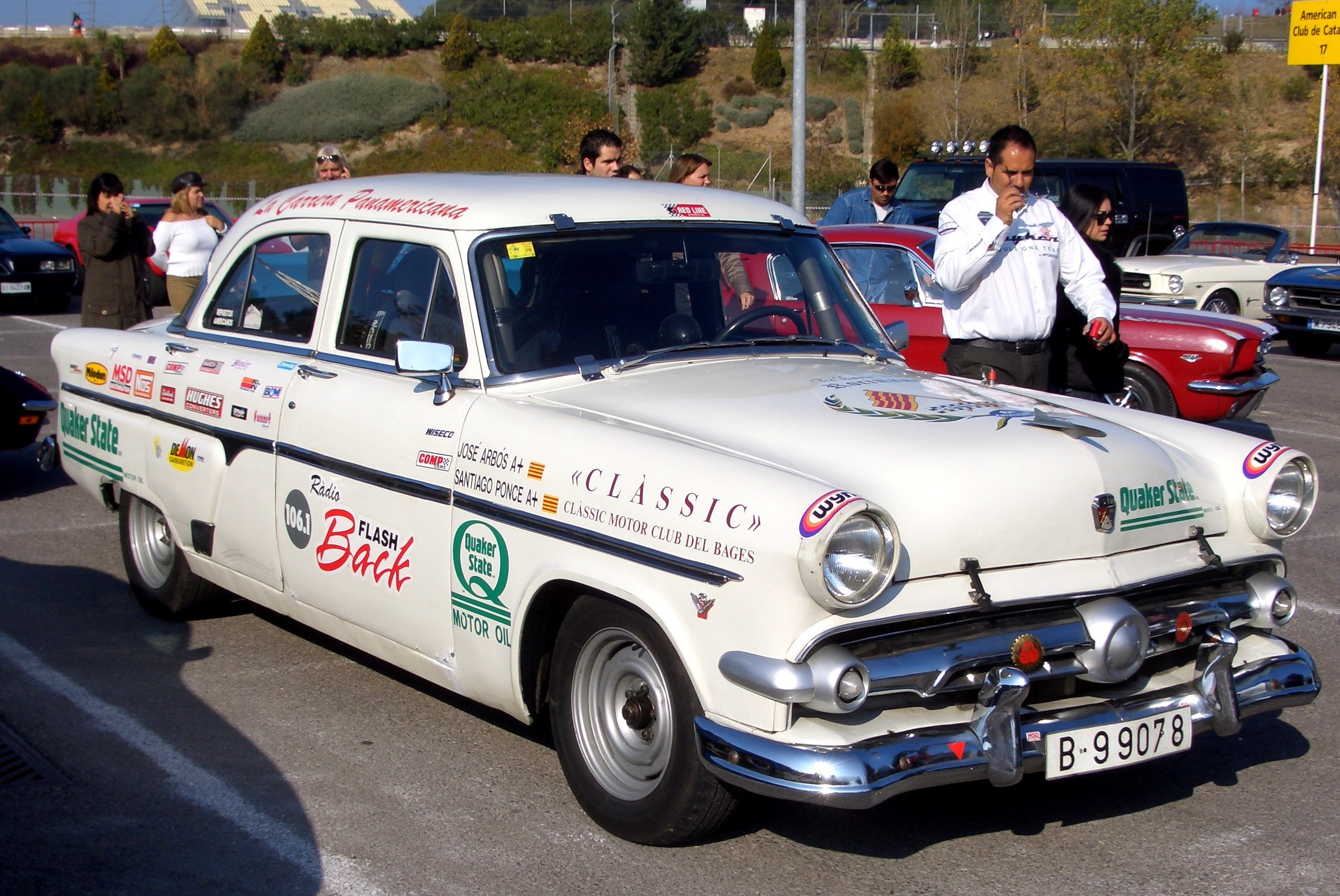
1954 Ford Customline sedan in Carrera Panamericana trim.

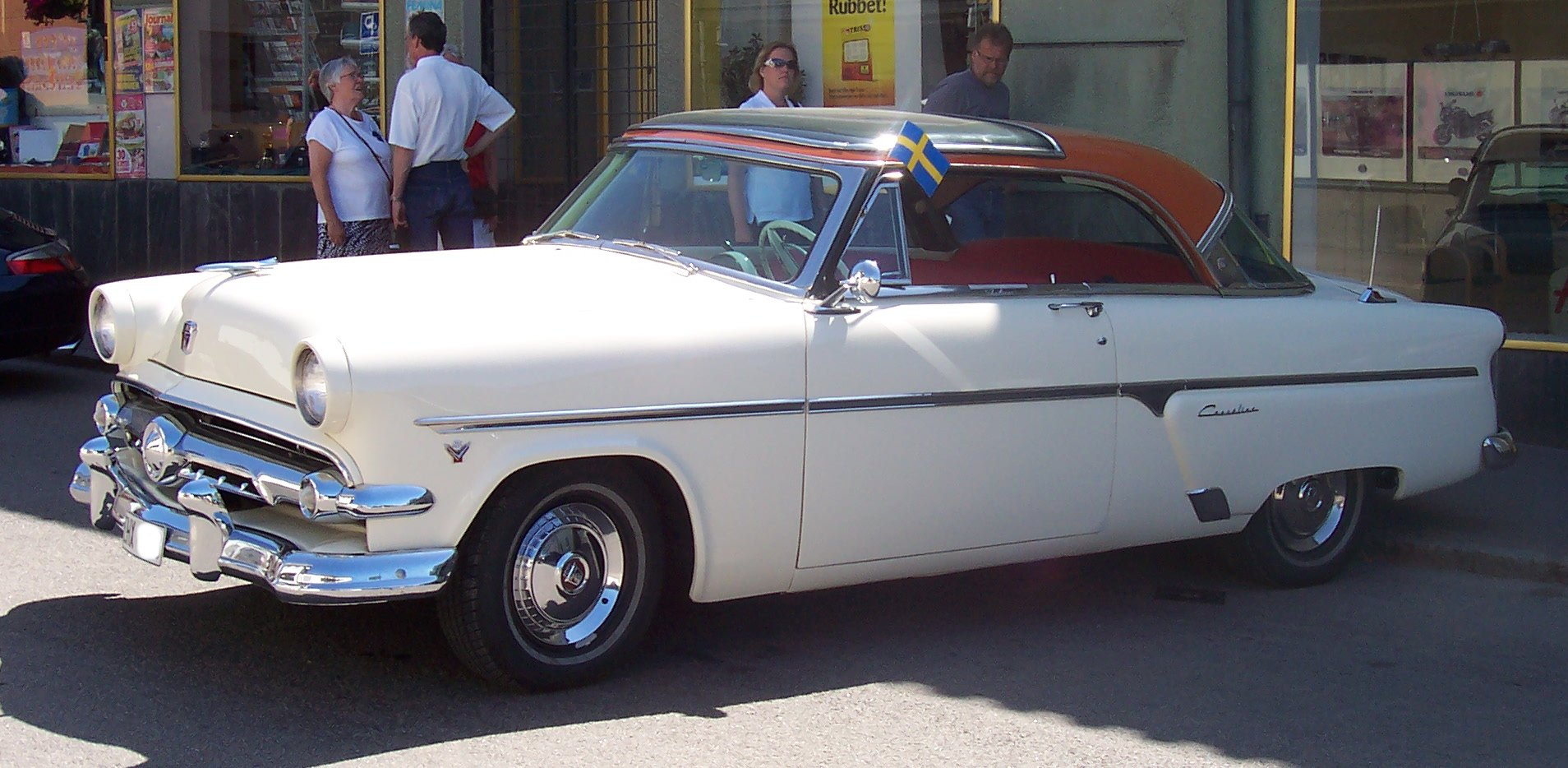
1954 Ford Crestline Skyliner

The long-lived flathead V8 engine was replaced for 1954 by a 239 cubic inch overhead valve Y-block unit, marking the end of an era. This engine produced 130 hp (97 kW) with a two-barrel carburetor. An impressive 160 hp (119 kW) 256 CI version with a Holley four-barrel was available in the official-use-only law enforcement model. The six-cylinder was up to 223 cu in (3.7 L) and now produced 115 hp. Another new addition was the "Crestline Skyliner" two-door hardtop, which featured an acrylic glass panel over the front half of the roof. Also added was the new "Astra-Dial Control Panel" speedometer, which has a clear, plastic covering on the top, which let sunlight illuminate it in the day-time. New power accessories included a four-way power front seat. The "woody" Country Squire wagon now used artificial fiberglass panels but remained the most expensive Ford.

== Australian production ==
The 1952 Ford was also produced by Ford Australia from October 1952 to 1955. A four-door sedan was offered as the V8 Customline and a two-door coupe utility was marketed as the V8 Mainline Utility. Along with the general improvements for all 1952 Fords, the Australian-assembled model also got increased ground clearance to better cope with Australian road conditions. The Utility was developed by Ford Australia using the chassis of the US Ford two-door convertible. Both models were updated in 1953 and 1954 along the lines of the US Fords and were powered by a 110 hp (82 kW) iteration of the 3.9 litre Flathead V8 which went into Australian production in 1952. The Australian 1954s (arriving in June 1954) retained the flathead V8 rather than the new overhead-valve unit used in the United States, but received some visual alterations mostly consisting of additional chrome. The bumpers were deeper, wraparound units, while the taillights were redesigned, a full-length chrome strip was fitted along the side, and an airplane-shaped bonnet ornament was fitted. The interior was now available in either Vynex or leather.

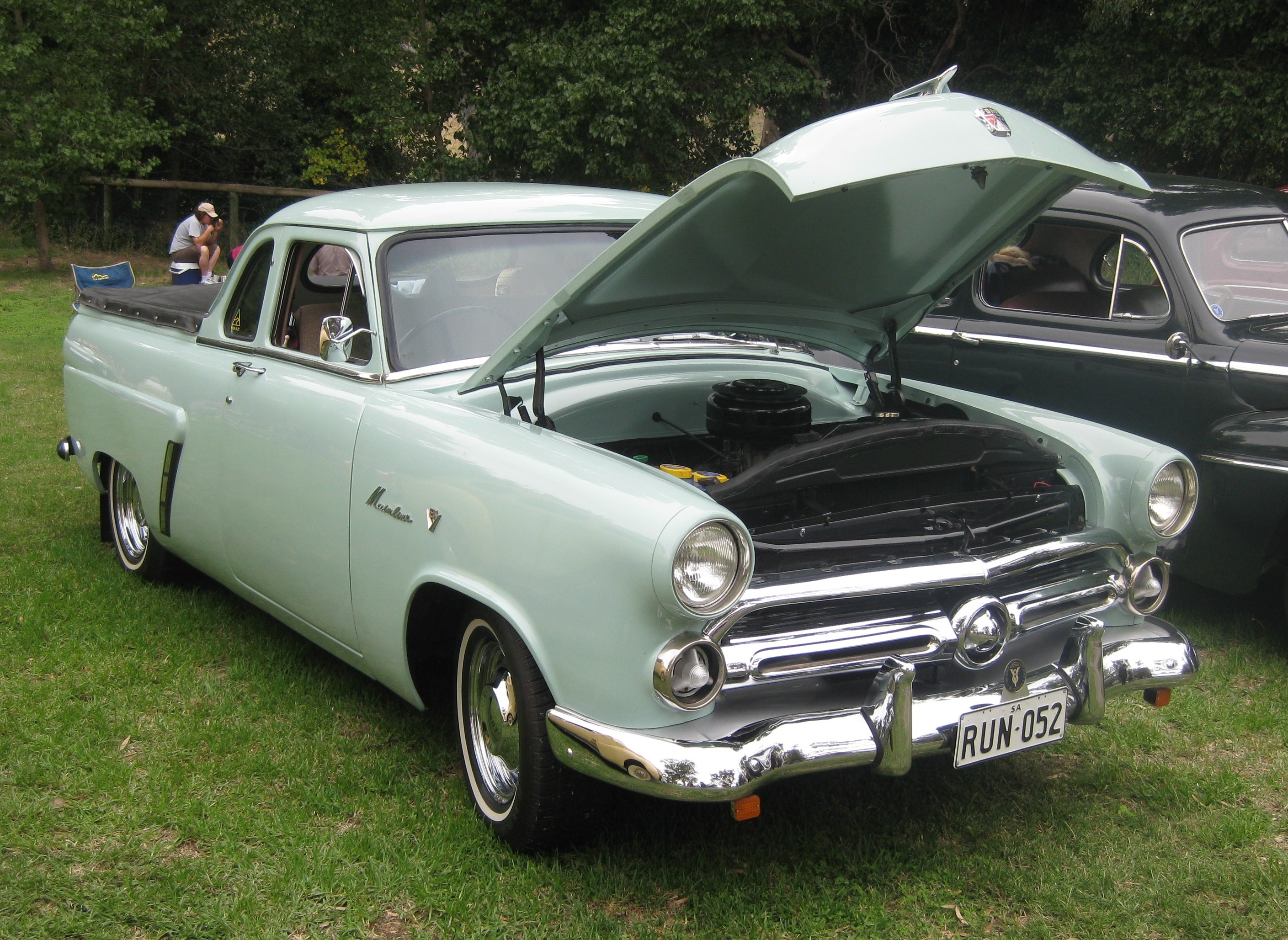
1952 Ford V8 Mainline Coupe Utility

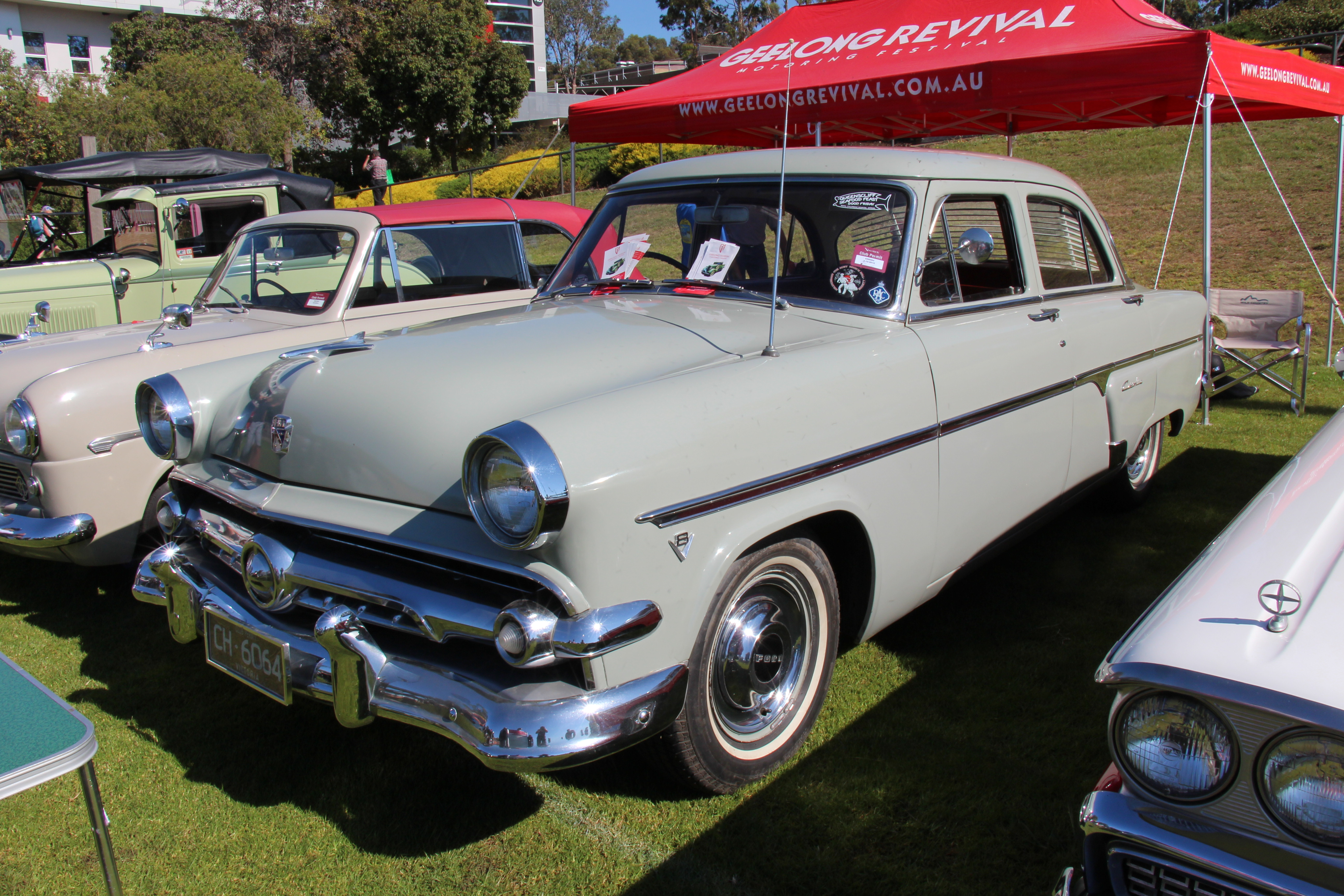
1954 Ford V8 Customline

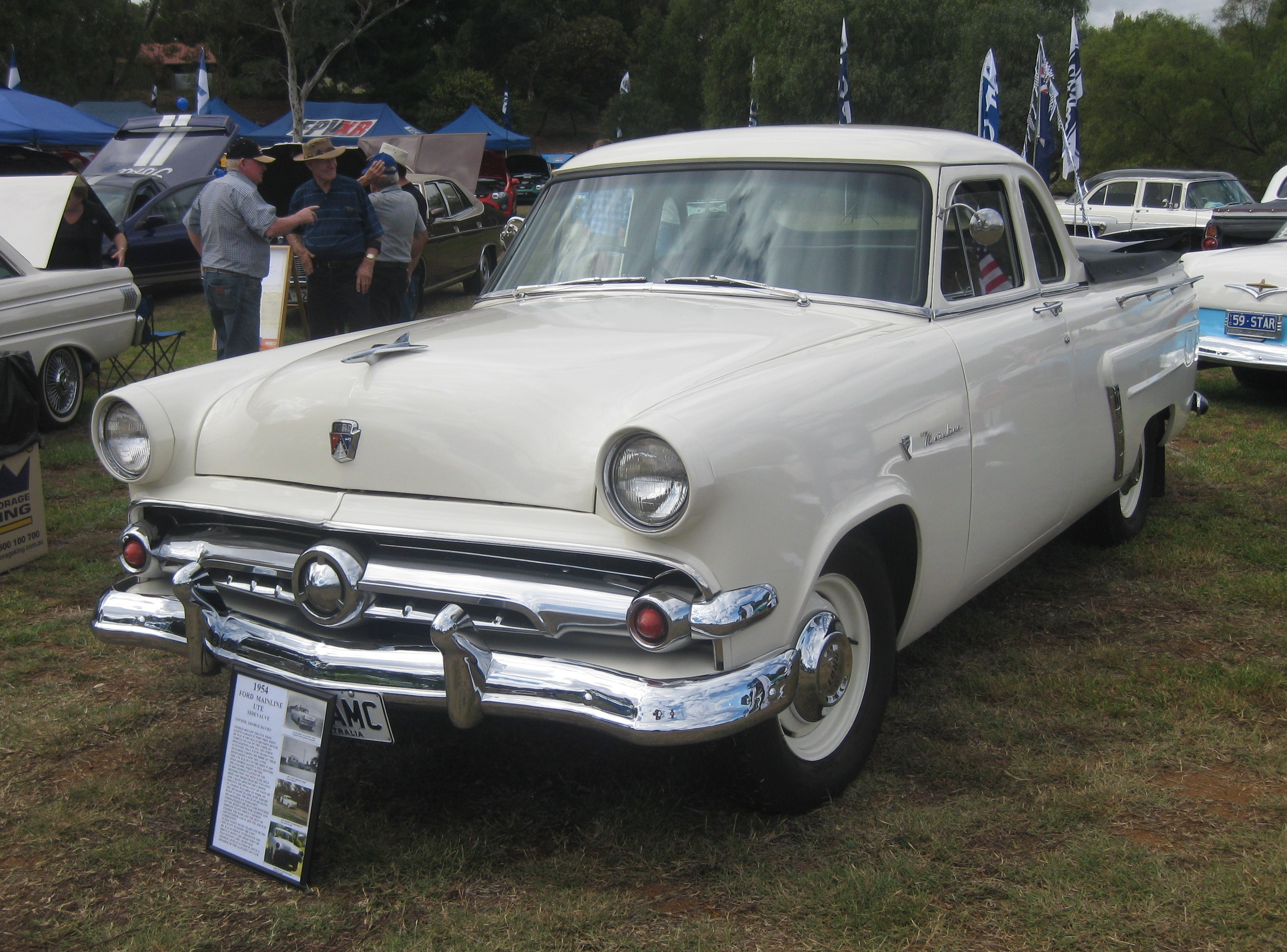
1954 Ford V8 Mainline Coupe Utility
