= Ford Crestline =

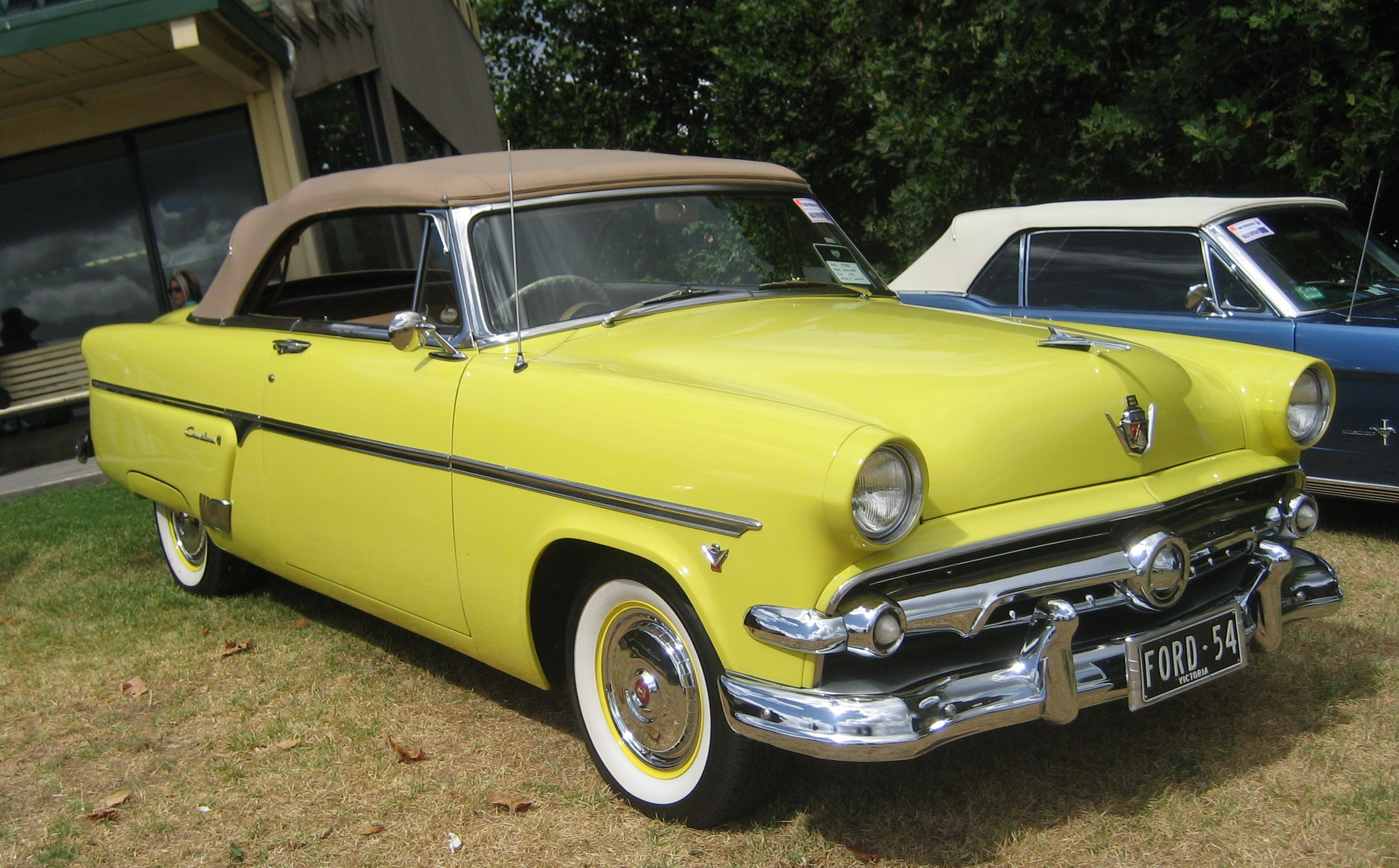
- 1954 Ford Crestline Sunliner

Overview
- Manufacturer: Ford
- Model years: 1952–1954
- Assembly: Main Plant; Dearborn, MI; Branch Assembly; Twin Cities, MN; Somerville, MA; Richmond, CA; Norfolk, VA; Memphis, TN; Louisville, KY; Long Beach, CA; Kansas City, MO; Edgewater, NJ; Dallas, TX; Chicago, IL; Chester, PA; Buffalo, NY; Atlanta, GA

Body and chassis
- Class: Full-size
- Body style: 4-door sedan 2-door hardtop 2-door convertible 4-door station wagon
- Layout: FR layout
- Related: Lincoln Capri; Mercury Custom

Powertrain
- Engine: 215 cu in (3.5 L) L6; 223 cu in (3.7 L) L6; 239 cu in (3.9 L) Flathead V8; 239 cu in (3.9 L) Y-Block V8

Dimensions
- Wheelbase: 115 in (2,921 mm)
- Length: 197.8 in (5,024 mm)
- Width: 73.9 in (1,877 mm)
- Height: 62.1 in (1,577 mm)
- Curb weight: 3,173 lb (1,439 kg)

Chronology
- Predecessor: 1949 Ford
- Successor: Ford Fairlane

The Ford Crestline is an automobile which was produced by Ford in the United States for models years 1952 to 1954.

== 1952 ==
The Crestline was introduced as the top trim level of the 1952 Ford range, above the intermediate-level Customline and base level Mainline. It was offered in Victoria, Sunliner and Country Squire versions with 2-door hardtop, 2-door convertible and 4-door station wagon body styles respectively. Crestlines were offered only with a 239 cu in (3,920 cm^{3}) "flathead" V8 engine.

== 1953 ==
The Crestline was updated with minor styling and trim changes for 1953. It retained its position as the top trim level in the Ford range while body styles and engine availability also remained unchanged.

== 1954 ==
For 1954 the Crestline was again updated with minor styling and trim changes. Fordor Sedan and Skyliner versions were added, the latter being a 2-door hardtop with a tinted acrylic glass panel in the front section of the roof. 13,144 were sold in the single year of production, more than the two years of Crown Victoria Skyliner production that would follow. New 223 cu in (3,650 cm^{3}) straight-six and 239 cu in (3,920 cm^{3}) overhead valve V8 engines were offered.

The Crestline was replaced by the Ford Fairlane in the 1955 Ford range.

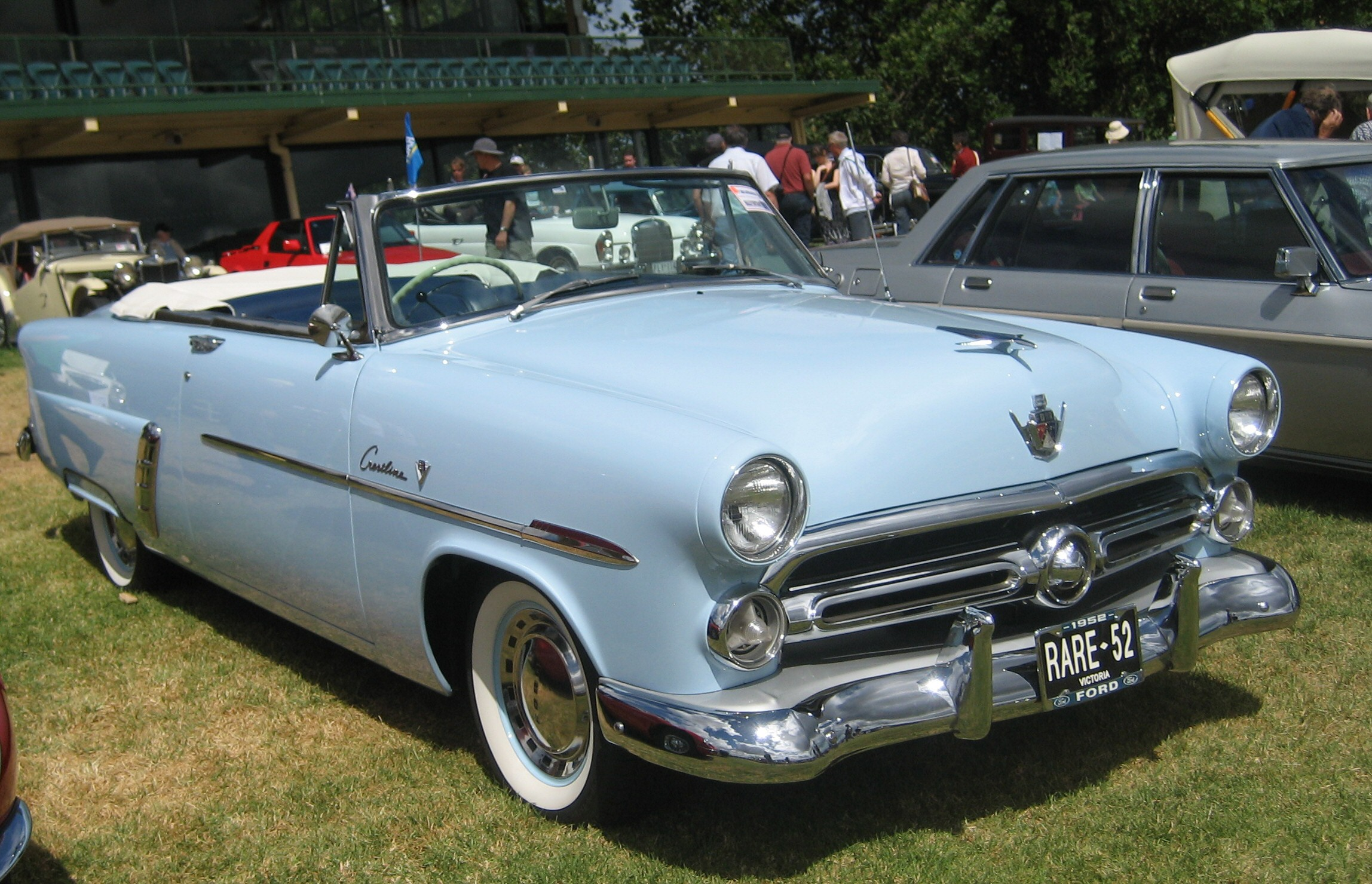
1952 Ford Crestline Sunliner

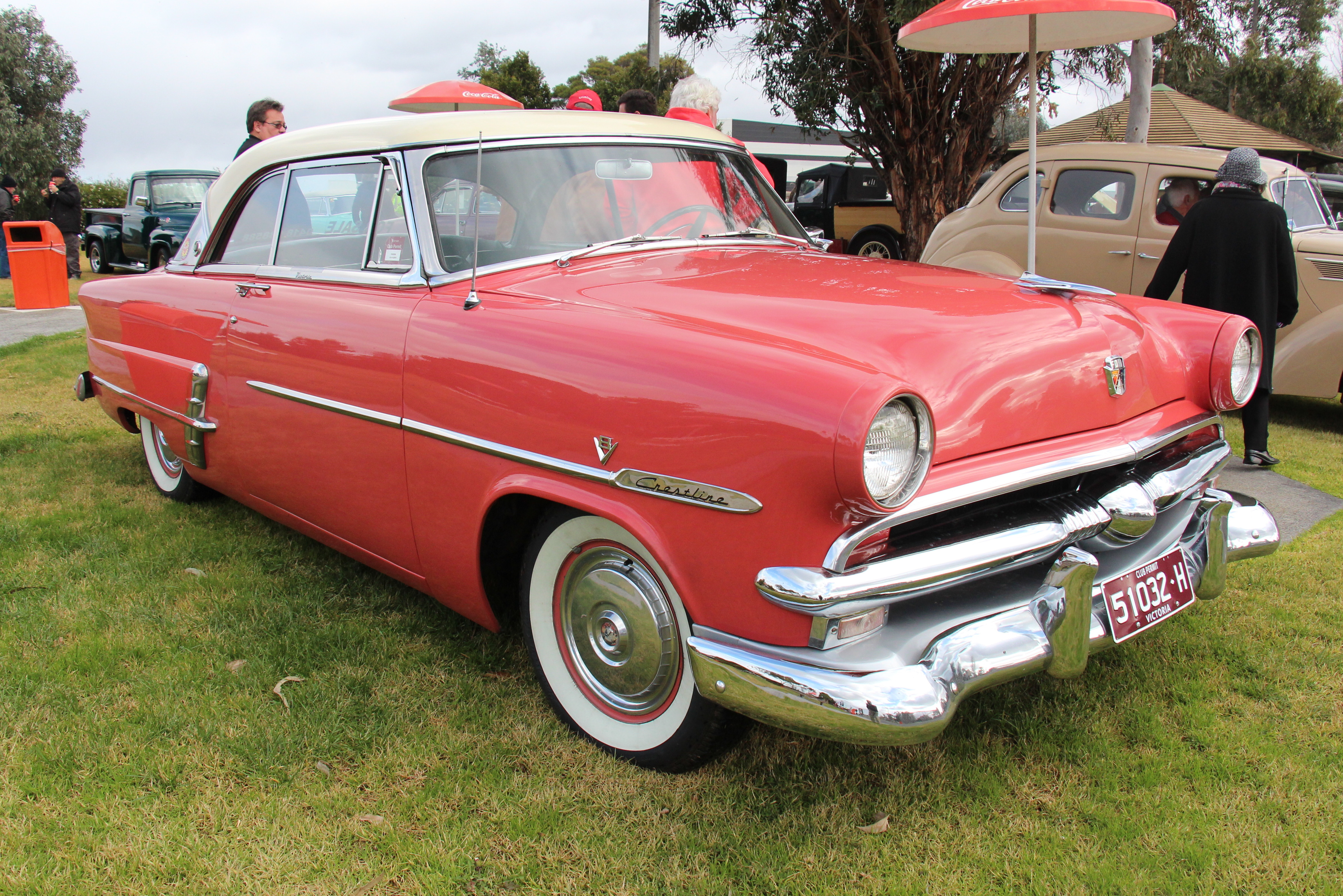
1953 Ford Crestline Victoria

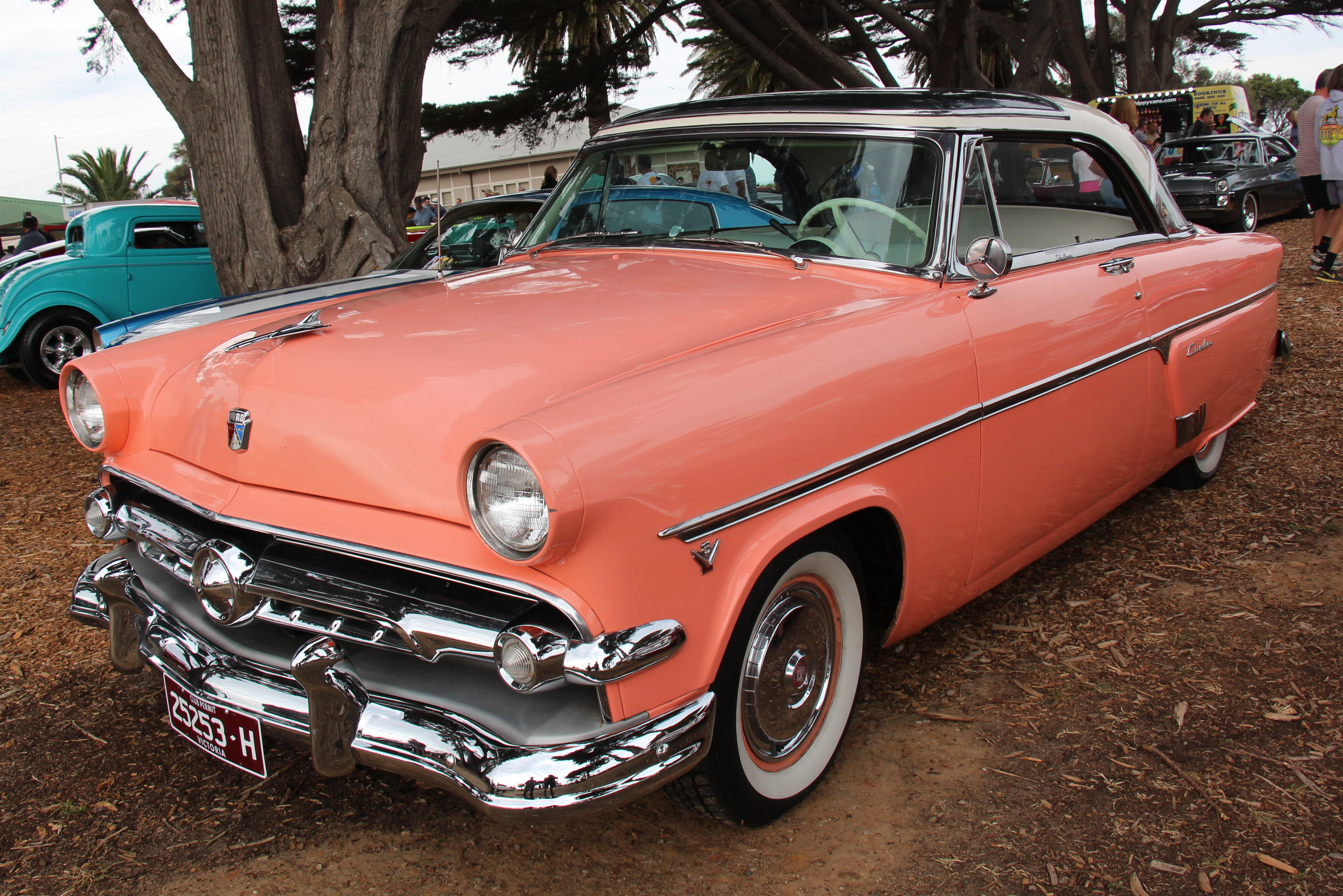
1954 Ford Crestline Skyliner

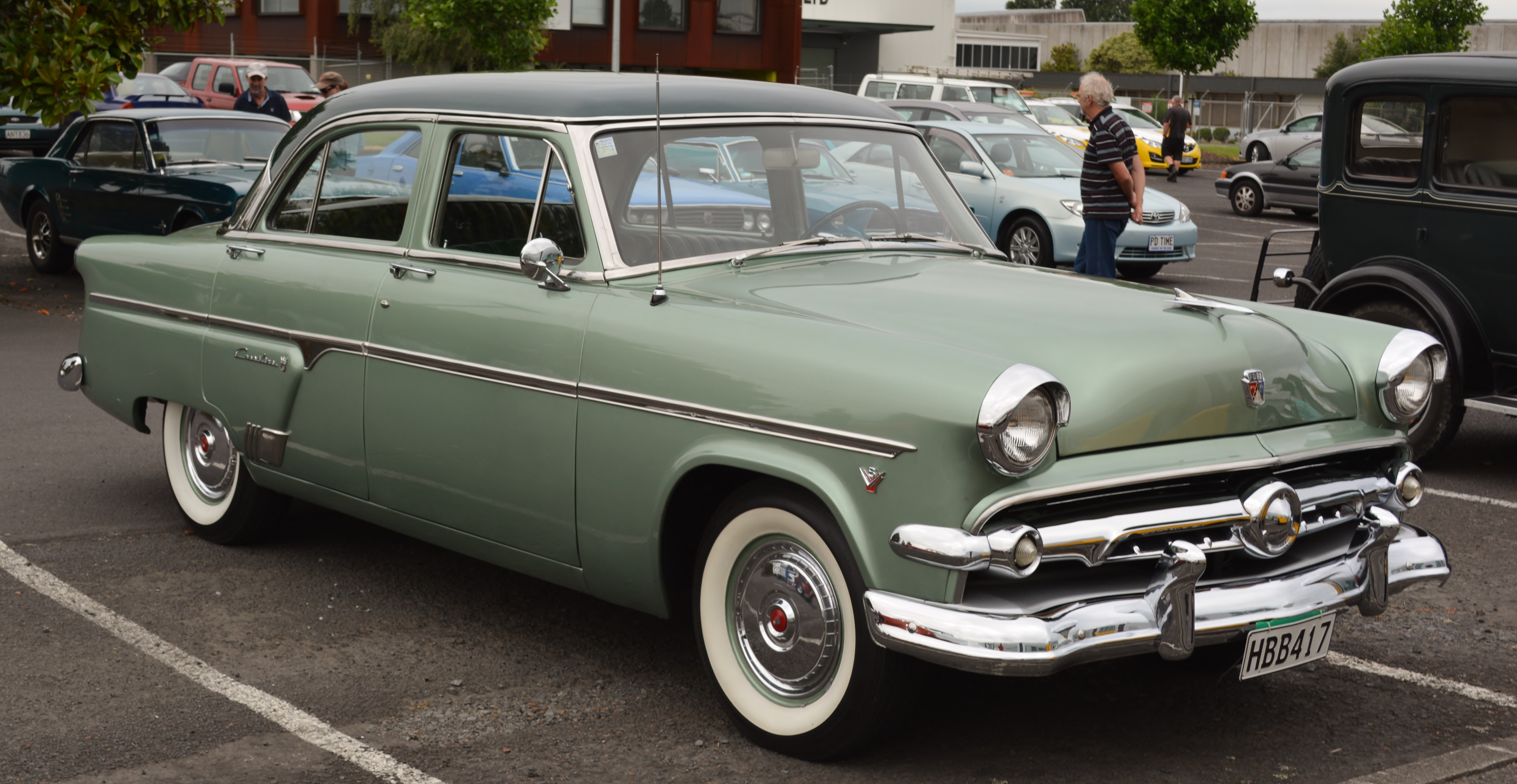
1954 Ford Crestline Fordor Sedan
