= Ford Customline =

Mid level full sized motor vehicle produced by Ford from 1952 until 1956

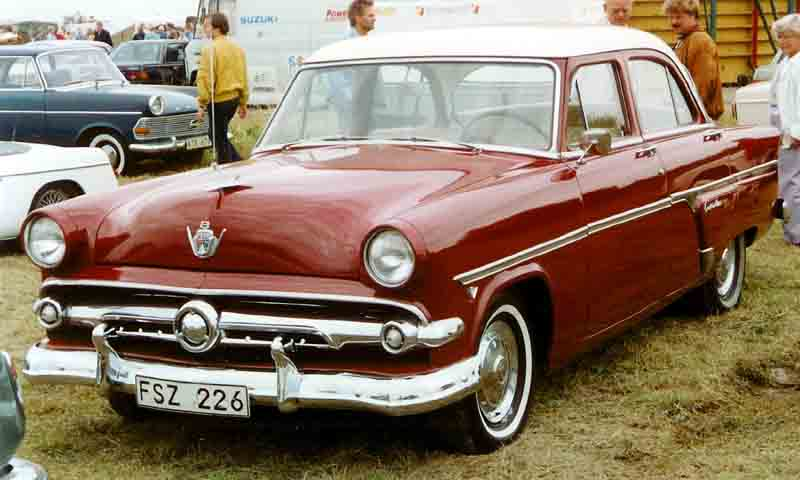
- 1954 Ford Customline “Fordor” Sedan

Overview
- Manufacturer: Ford
- Production: 1952–1956
- Assembly: Main plant: United States: Dearborn, Michigan; Branch assembly Twin Cities, MN; Somerville, MA; Richmond, CA; Norfolk, VA; Memphis, TN; Louisville, KY; Long Beach, CA; Kansas City, MO; Edgewater, NJ; Dallas, TX; Chicago, IL; Chester, PA; Buffalo, NY; Atlanta, GA; Australia: Geelong, Victoria (Ford Australia)

Body and chassis
- Class: Full-size
- Body style: two-door sedan four-door sedan
- Layout: FR layout

Chronology
- Successor: Ford Custom 300

The Ford Customline is an automobile model that was sold between 1952 and 1956 by Ford in North America.

== First generation (1952–1954) ==
First generation
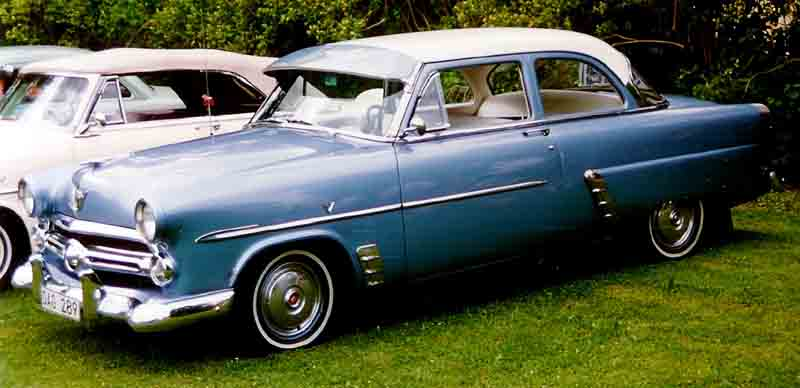
- 1952 Ford Customline Tudor Sedan

Overview
- Manufacturer: Ford
- Production: 1952–1954

Body and chassis
- Class: Full-size
- Body style: 2-door sedan 4-door sedan 2-door coupé 2-door station wagon 4-door station wagon
- Layout: FR layout

=== 1952 ===
The Ford Customline was introduced in 1952 as the mid-range model in that year’s US Ford range, positioned below the Ford Crestline and above the Ford Mainline. It was offered in 2-door sedan, 4-door sedan, 2-door coupé & 4-door station wagon body styles. The coupe was marketed as the Club Coupe and the station wagon as the Customline Country Sedan. 1952 Customlines were available with 215 cubic inches (3,520 cc) inline six-cylinder or 239 cubic inches (3,920 cc) V8 engines. Production totaled 402,542 units.

=== 1953 ===
The 1953 Customlines continued the 1952 bodies with only minor changes. Production totaled 761,662 units.

=== 1954 ===
The 1954 Customlines used the 1952-53 bodies with only minor changes. The Customline range now included a new 2-door Ranch Wagon. Engines were now 223 cubic inches (3,650 cc) inline six-cylinder or 239 cubic inches (3,920 cc) overhead valve V8. 1954 Customline production totaled 674,295 units.

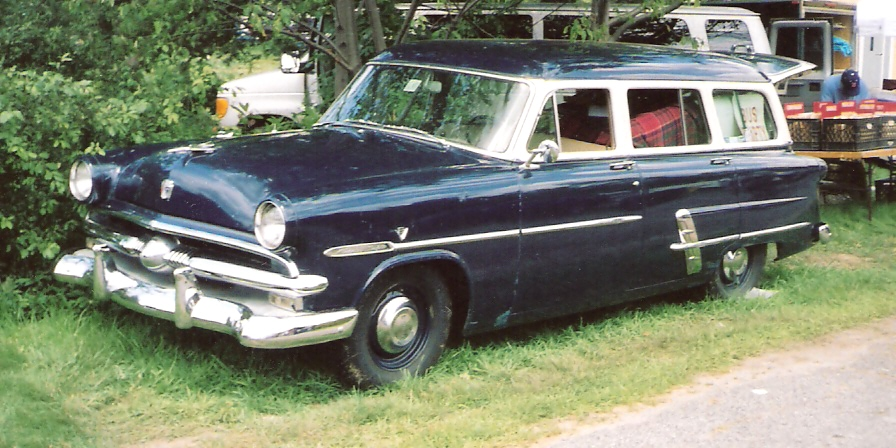
1953 Ford Customline Country Sedan

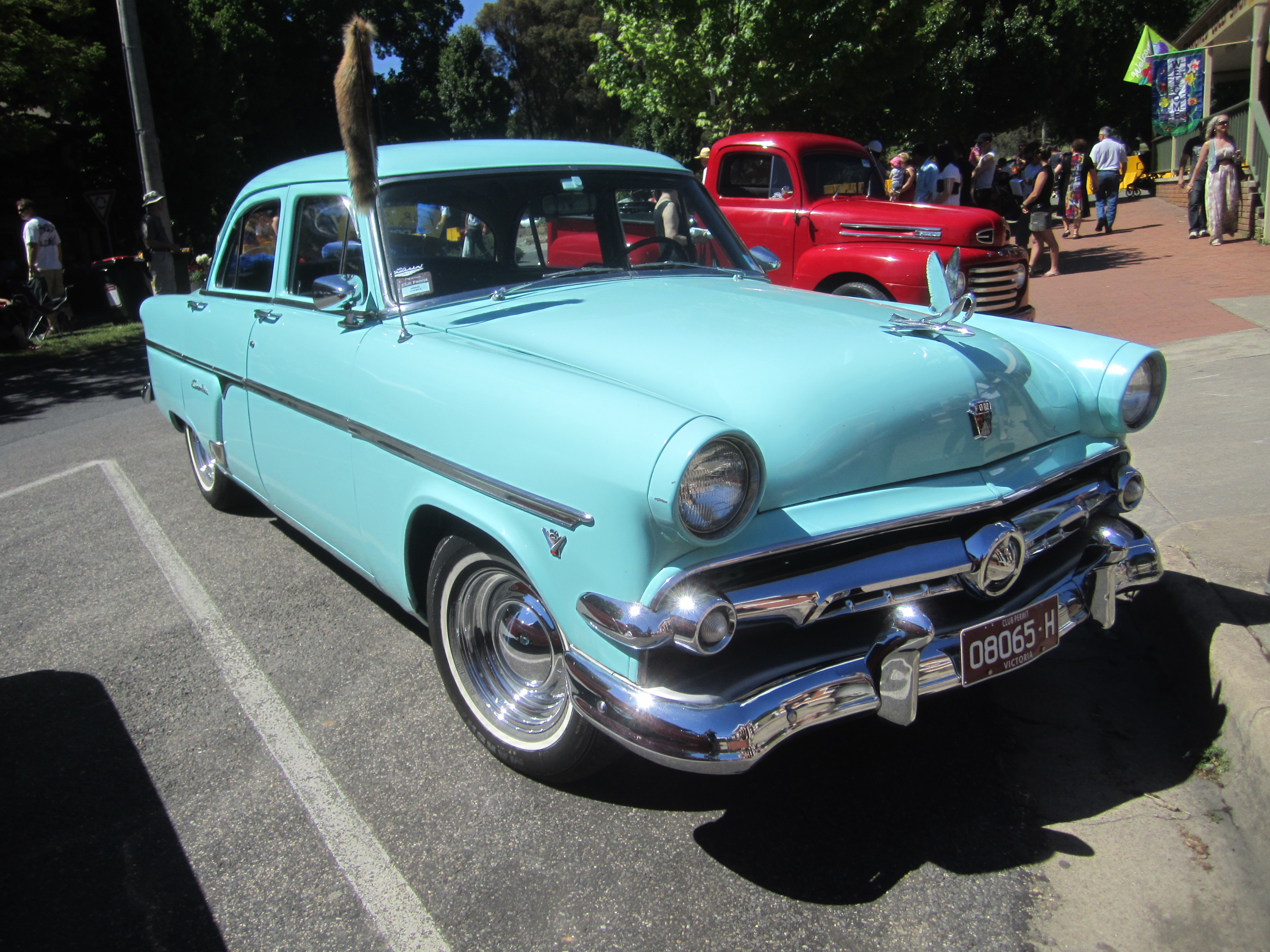
1954 Ford Customline “Fordor” Sedan

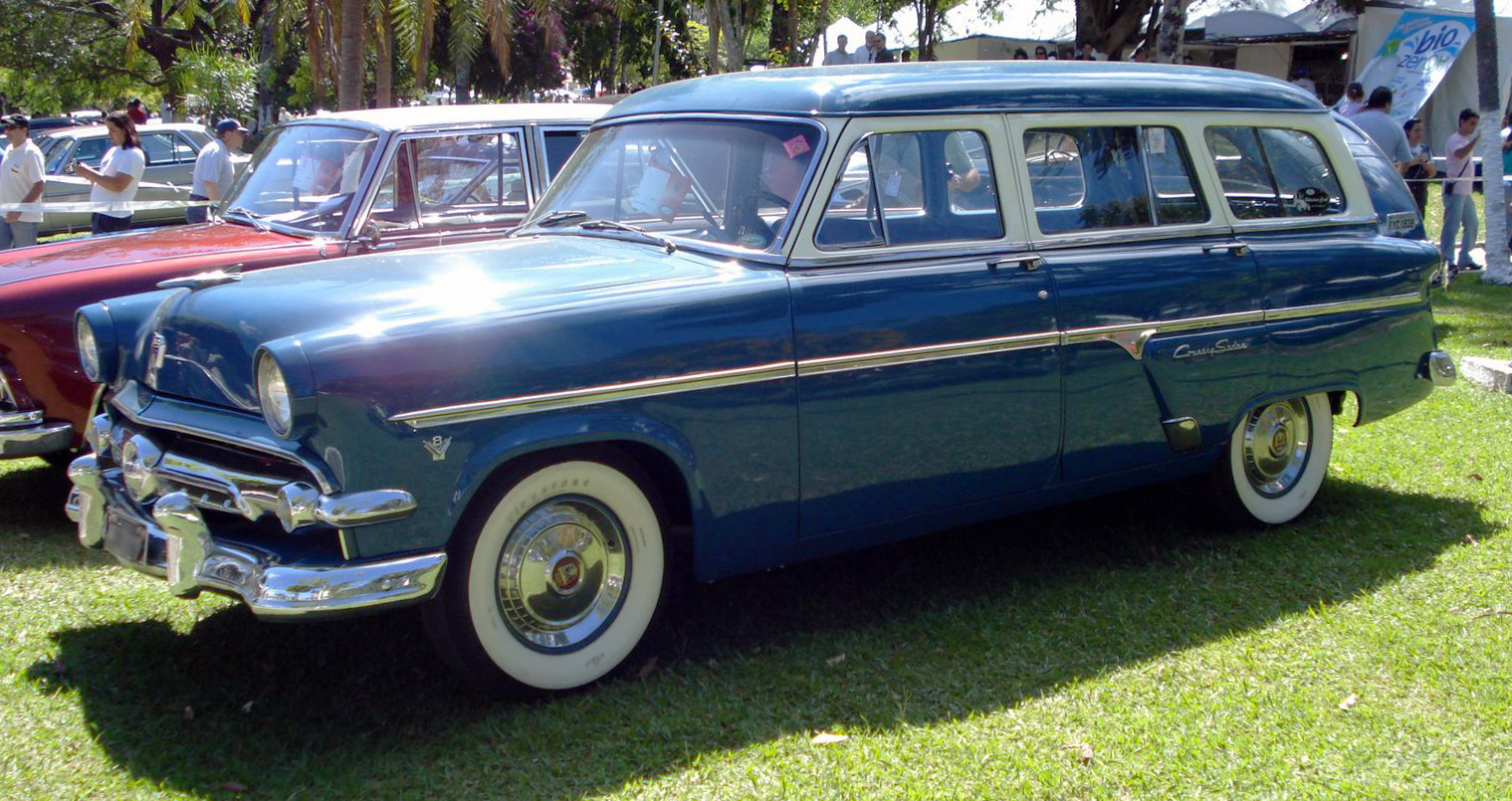
1954 Ford Customline Country Sedan

== Second generation (1955–1956) ==
Second generation
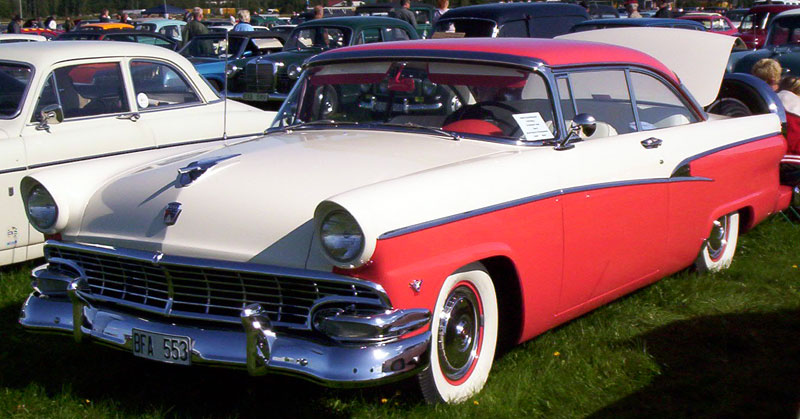
- 1956 Ford Customline Victoria

Overview
- Manufacturer: Ford
- Production: 1955–1956

Body and chassis
- Class: Full-size
- Body style: 2-door sedan 4-door sedan 2-door hardtop coupe
- Layout: FR layout

=== 1955 ===
The 1955 Customline was redesigned with new longer, lower and wider bodies. It continued as the mid range trim level, now positioned below the new Ford Fairlane and above the Ford Mainline. It was offered in 2-door sedan and 4-door sedan body styles only, with the wagons now included in their own series which comprised the Ford Ranch Wagon, Ford Country Sedan and Ford Country Squire. Customlines were available with 223 cubic inches (3,650 cc) inline six-cylinder or 272 cubic inches (4,460 cc) V8 engines. 1955 Customline production totaled 471,992 units.

=== 1956 ===
The 1956 Customlines utilized the 1955 bodies with only minor changes. A Customline Victoria 2-door hardtop was added to the range. 1956 Customline production totaled 368,653 units, and was manufactured in several branch assembly plants the company had continued to operate in the United States.

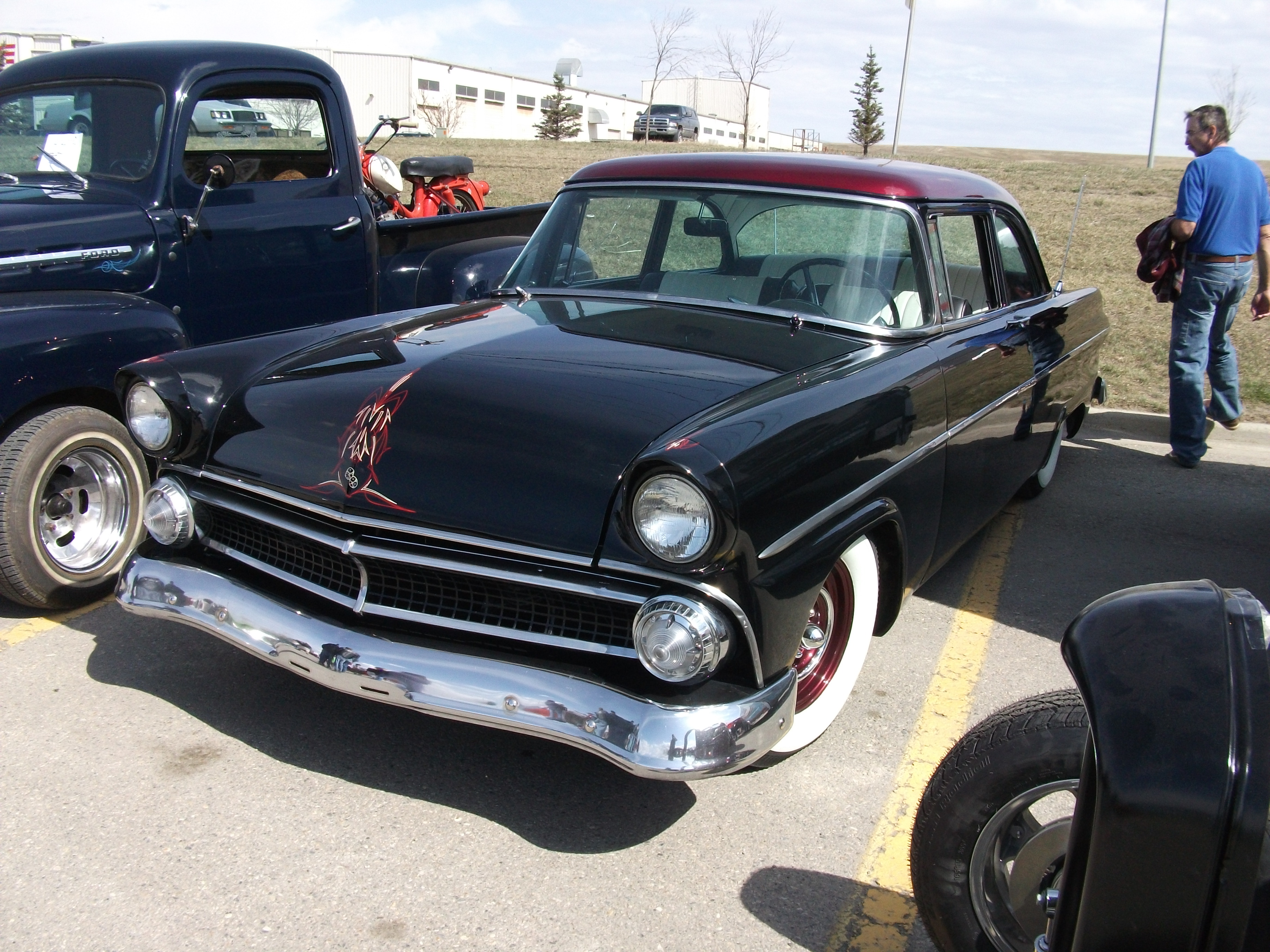
1955 Ford Customline Tudor Sedan

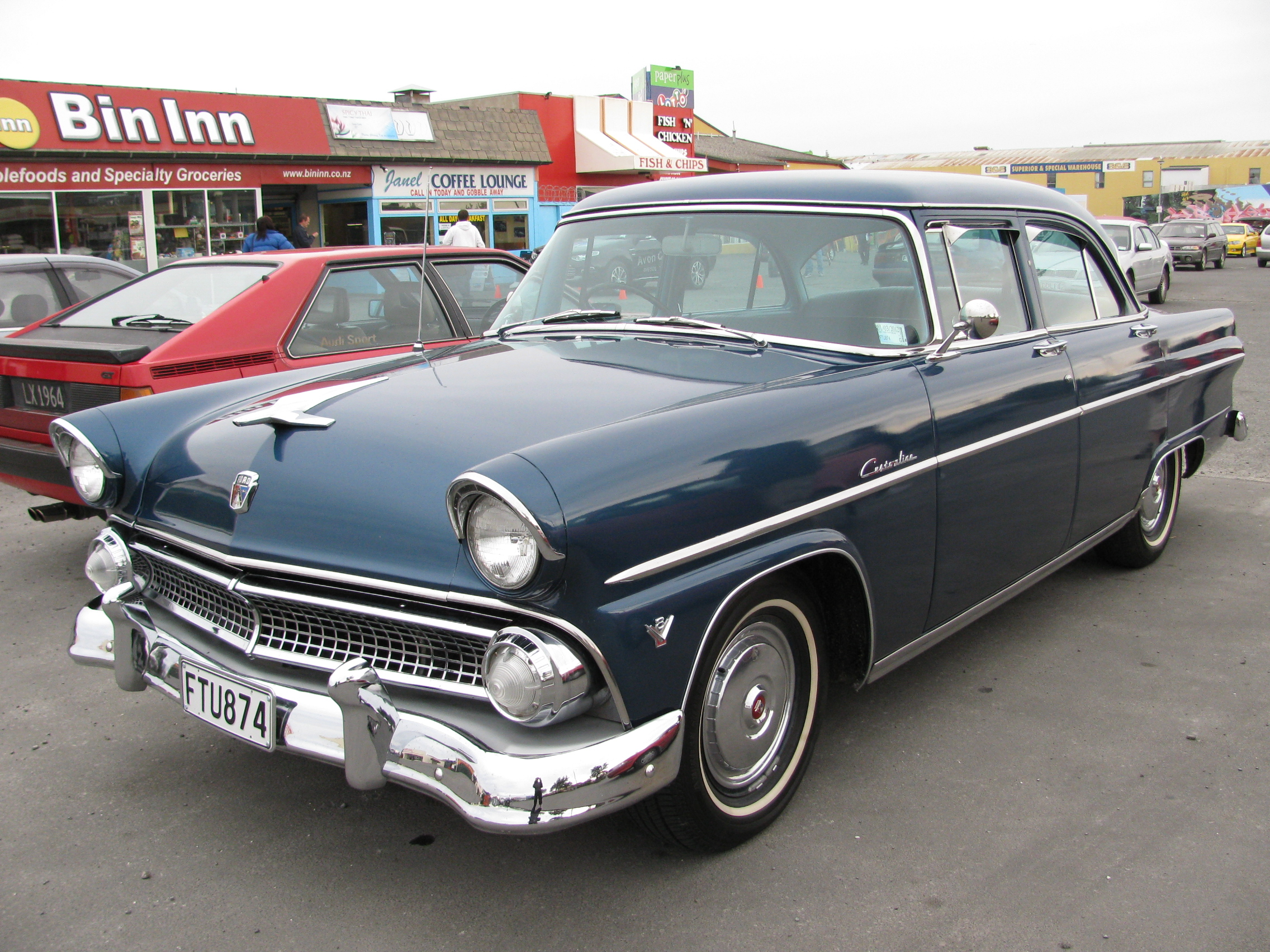
1955 Ford Customline Fordor Sedan

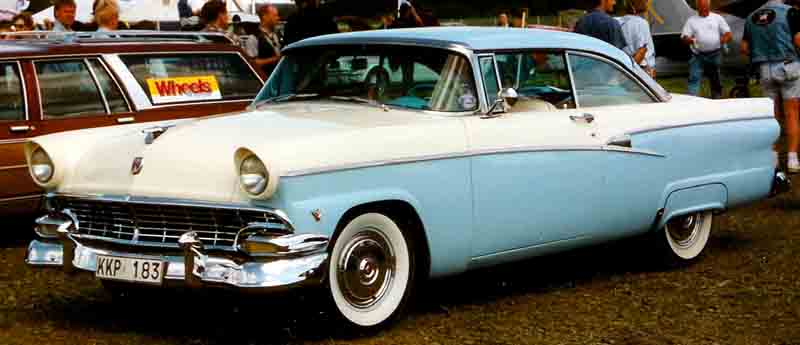
1956 Ford Customline Victoria

The Customline was not carried over to the 1957 model year.

== Australian production ==
The Customline was also produced by Ford Australia from 1952 to 1959. Cars were assembled using Australian built bodies and imported chassis kits which included all front sheet metal. In addition to the Customline sedan, a limited number of station wagons and the Australian developed Mainline Coupe Utility were produced.

The 1952 model was updated in 1953 and 1954 along the lines of the US Fords. All were powered by the Flathead V8 which went into Australian production in 1952. This included the 1954 model which was fitted with the older Chassis and engine rather than the new overhead valve Y-block V8 which had been introduced in the US for 1954. Australian 1954 Fords also used King Pin front suspension and still had 1952 rear Quarter Panels.

The 1955 body was used for four model series in Australia. The 1955 model was powered by the overhead valve Y-block V8 which had entered partial Australian production with locally sourced components. The 1956 model featured the 1956 US Customline grille, 12 volt electrics and a new Fordomatic automatic transmission option. The 1957 model retained the 1956 body but featured a large V8 badge positioned in the grille and utilized 1956 Ford Fairlane trim. The 1958 model used the 1955 Canadian Meteor grille with a four-pointed star and 1956 Meteor side trim. The 1958 ‘star model’ was badged as either a Customline or as a Fordomatic Production ended in September 1959 with the introduction of Australian assembled 1959 Fairlane 500, Custom 300 and Ranch Wagon models. An estimated 18,000 examples of the 1955-1959 sedan were produced.

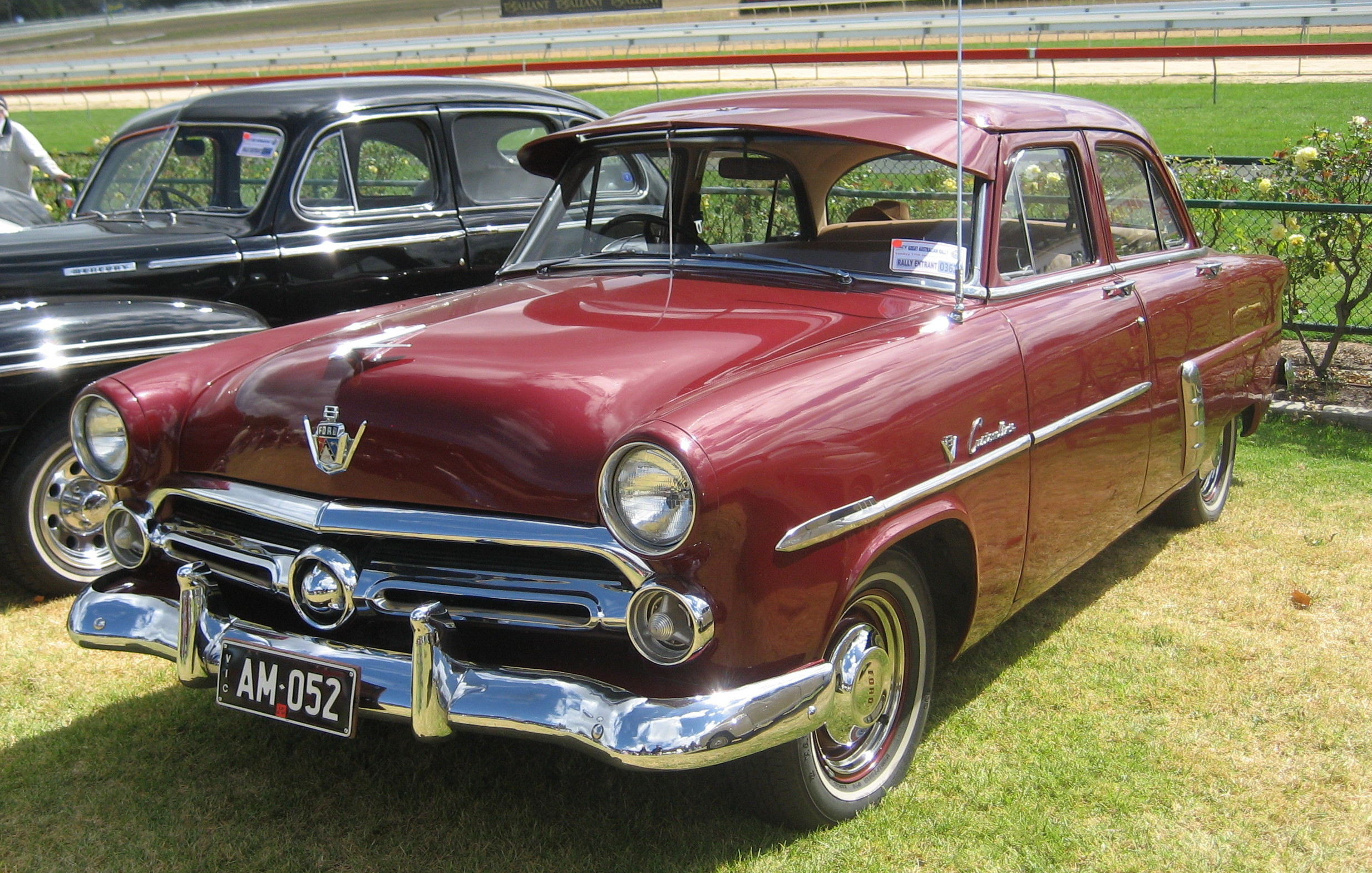
1952 Australian Ford V8 Customline

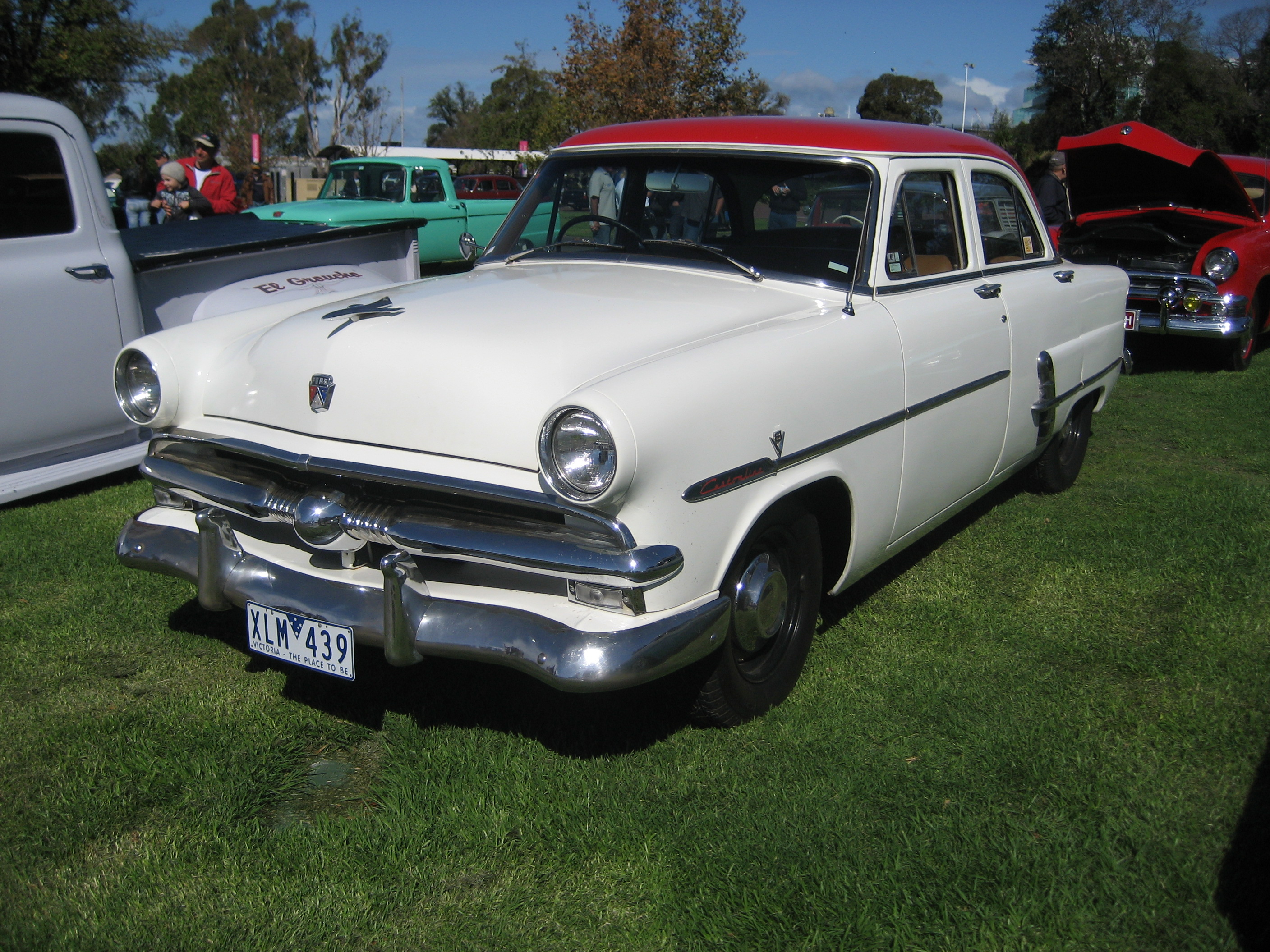
1953 Australian Ford V8 Customline

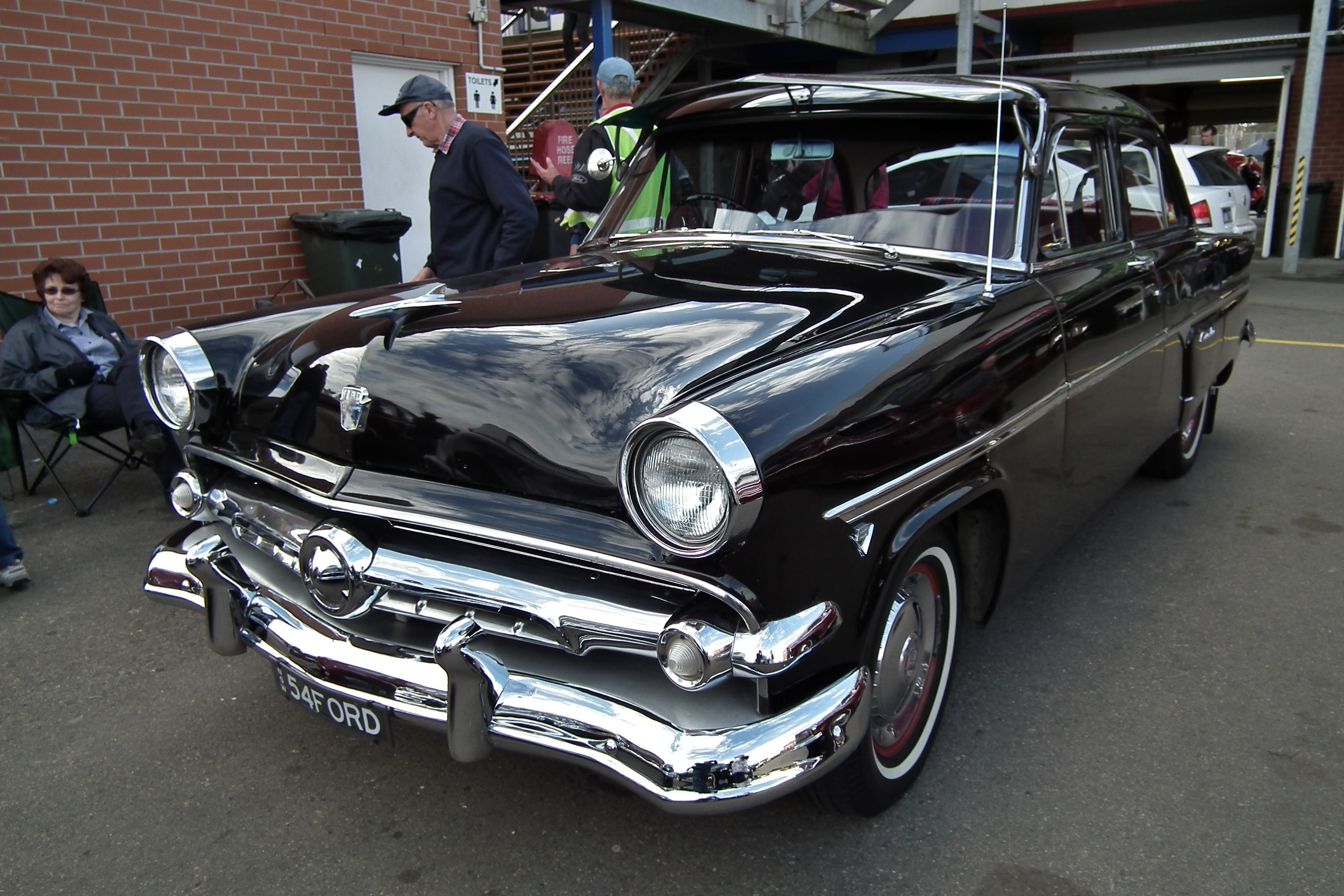
1954 Australian Ford V8 Customline

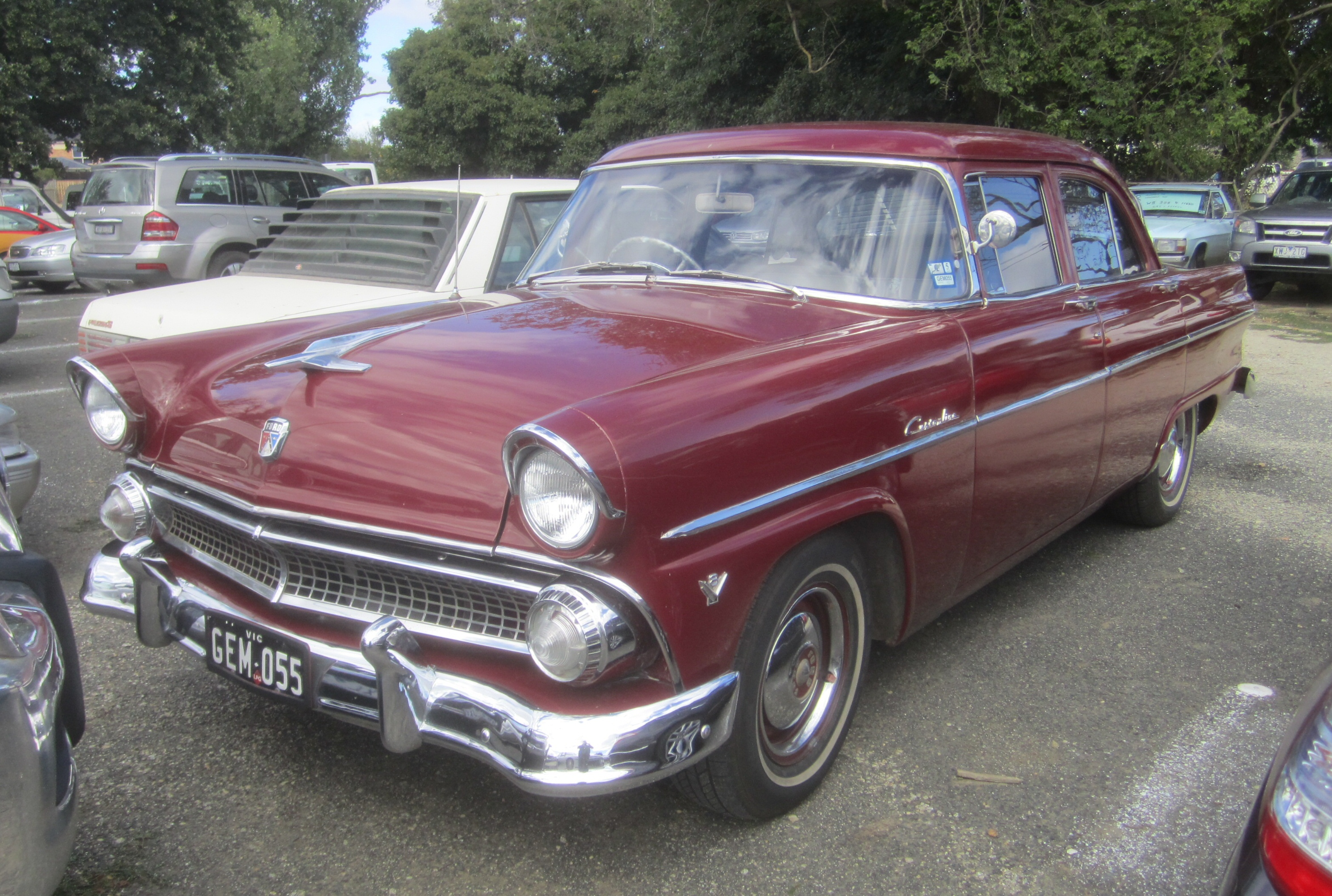
1955 Australian Ford V8 Customline

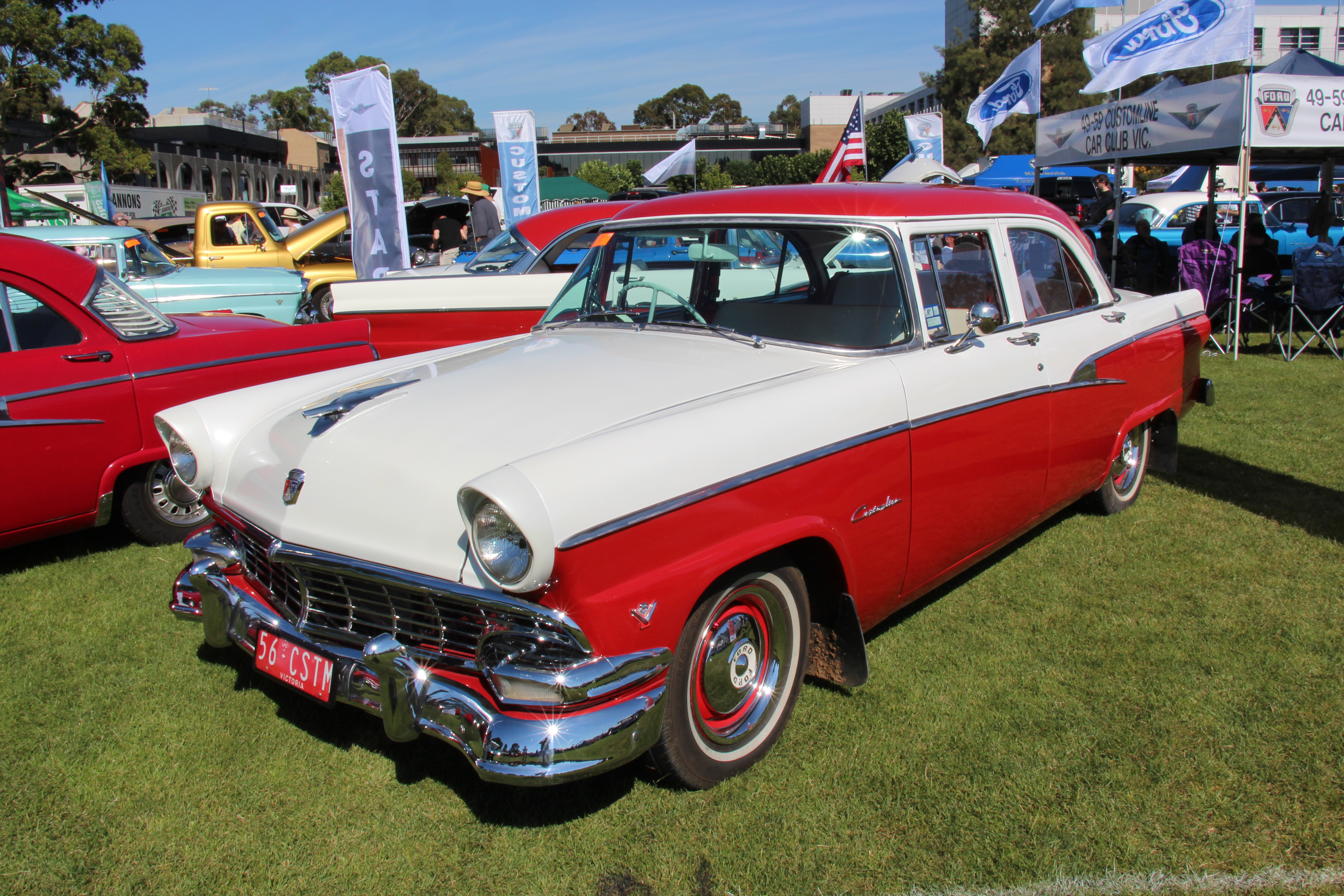
1956 Australian Ford V8 Customline

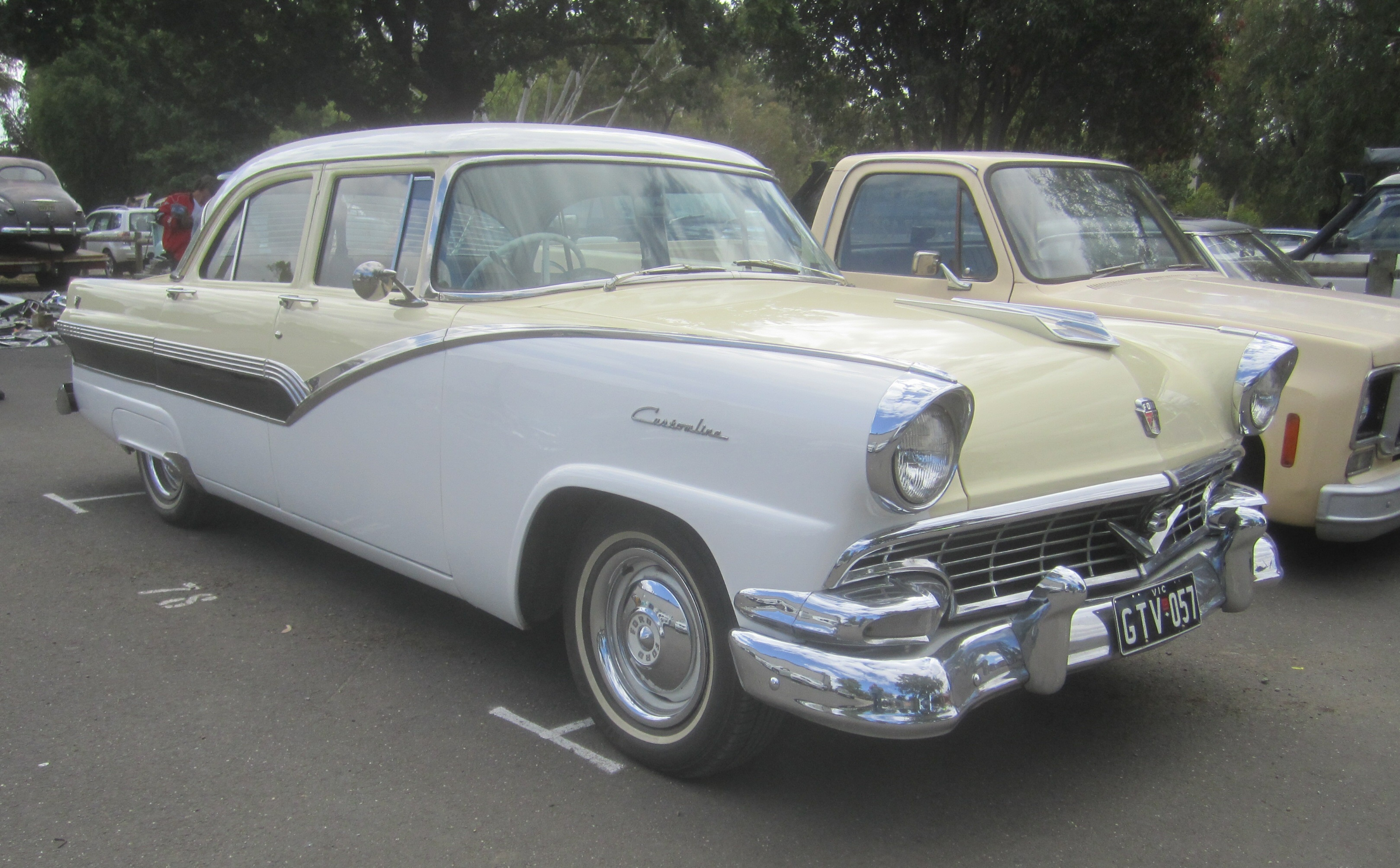
1957 Australian Ford V8 Customline

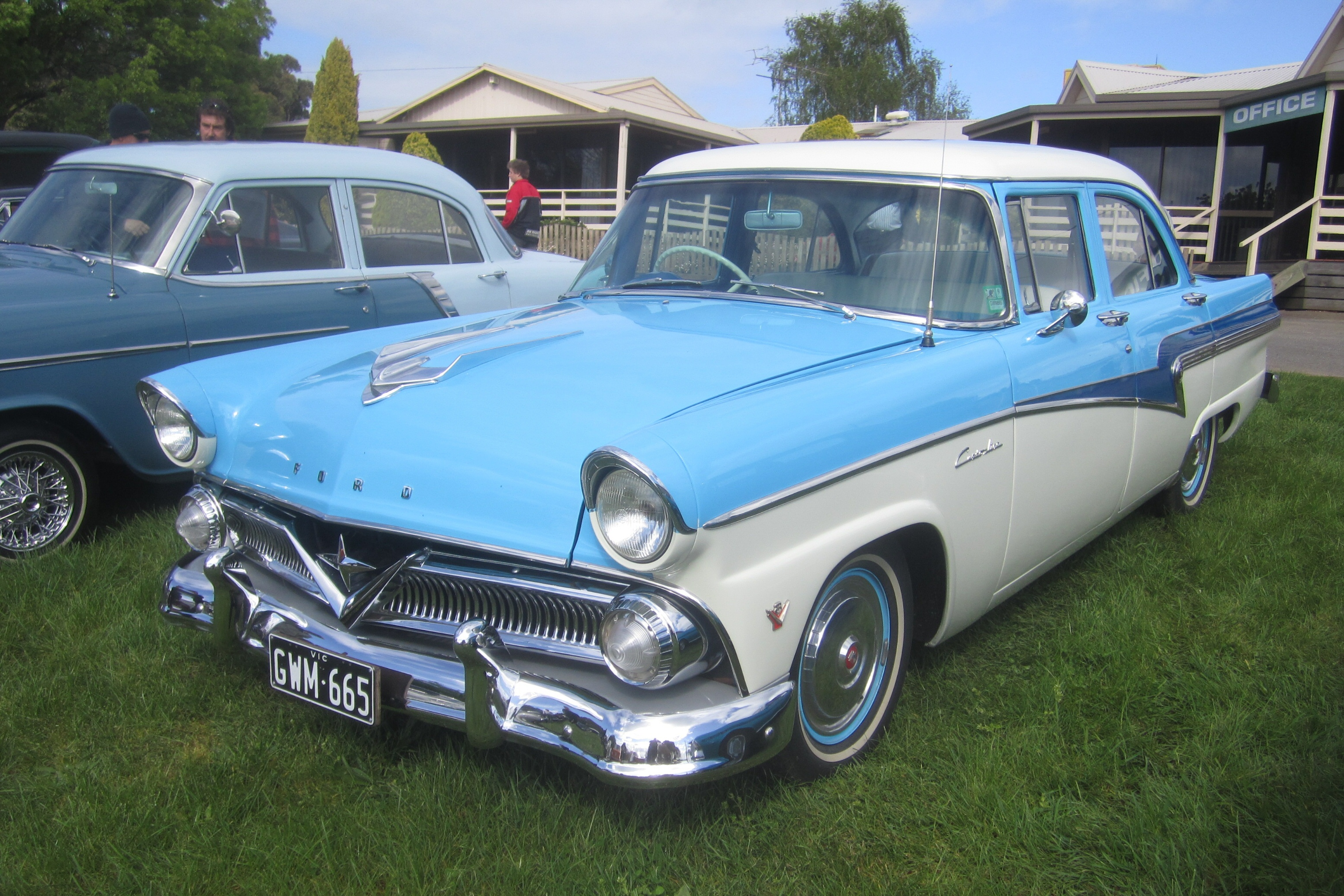
1958 Australian Ford V8 Customline with Fordomatic side trim

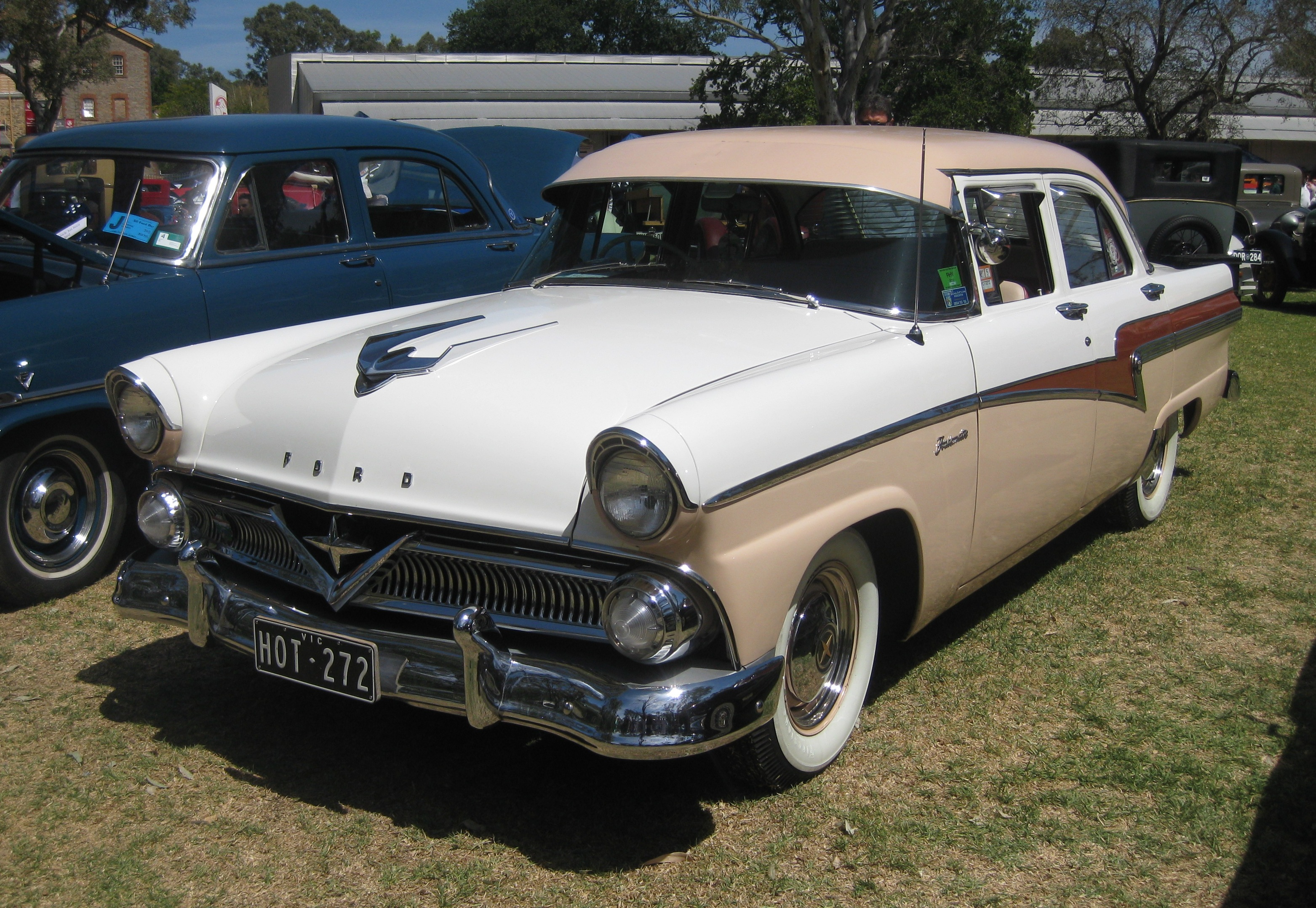
1958 Australian Ford V8 Fordomatic

== See also ==
- 1952 Ford
- 1955 Ford
