= Ford 500 =

Ford has used the 500 name on a number of cars, beginning with the 1957 Ford and continuing to the 2007 Ford Five Hundred:

- 1957–1959 Ford Fairlane 500 — upscale full-size car
- 1961 Ford Fairlane 500 — nicer base-model full-size car
- 1962–1964 Ford Galaxie 500 — upscale full-size car
- 1962–1971 Ford Fairlane 500 — upscale mid-size car
- 1964–1978 Ford Custom 500 — nicer base-model full-size car
- 1965–1974 Ford Galaxie 500 — upscale full-size car
- 1971–1971 Ford Torino 500 — intermediate-size car
- 2005–2007 Ford Five Hundred— full-size family sedan
