= 1960 Ford =

Ford
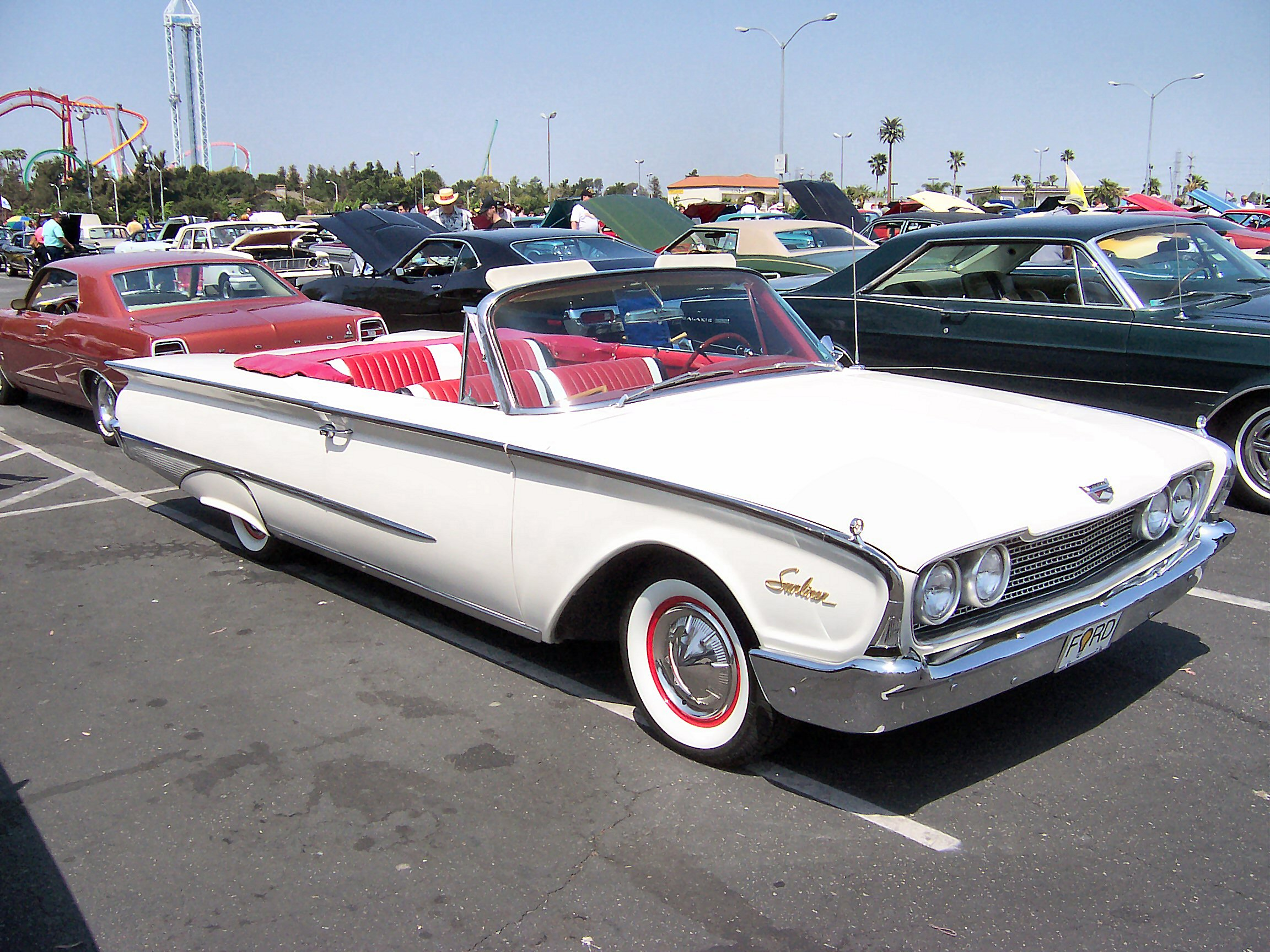
- 1960 Ford Galaxie Sunliner

Overview
- Manufacturer: Ford
- Also called: Ford Fairlane (1960–61); Ford Galaxie (1960–64); Ford Ranch Wagon (1960–62); Ford Country Sedan (1960–64); Ford Country Squire (1960–64); Ford Courier (1960); Ford 300 (1963); Ford Custom (1964)
- Production: 1960–1964

Body and chassis
- Class: Full-size Ford
- Body style: 2-door sedan (Club Sedan); 2-door business sedan 4-door sedan (Town Sedan); 2-door hardtop (Starliner, 60-61); 2-door hardtop (Club Victoria, 62-63); 2-door hardtop (Sportsroof, 63-64); 4-door hardtop (Town Victoria); 2-door convertible (Sunliner); 2-door station wagon (1960-1961); 4-door station wagon 2-door sedan delivery (Courier)
- Related: Edsel Ranger (1960); Edsel Villager (1960); Mercury Meteor (1961); Mercury Monterey (1961-1964); Mercury Montclair (1964); Mercury Park Lane (1964); Mercury Commuter (1964); Mercury Colony Park (1961-1964); Mercury S-55 (1962-1963); Mercury Marauder (1963-1964)

Powertrain
- Engine: 223 in^{3} (3.7 L) OHV I6; 260 in^{3} (4.3 L) Windsor V8; 289 in^{3} (4.7 L) Windsor V8; 292 in^{3} (4.8 L) Y-block V8; 352 in^{3} (5.8 L) FE series V8; 390 in^{3} (6.4 L) FE series V8; 406 in^{3} (6.6 L) FE series V8; 427 in^{3} (7.0 L) FE series V8

Dimensions
- Wheelbase: 119 in (3,023 mm)
- Length: 213.7 in (5,428 mm)
- Width: 81.5 in (2,070 mm)

Chronology
- Predecessor: 1957 Ford
- Successor: Ford Galaxie; Ford LTD (new trim); Ford Custom

The mainstream full-sized Ford line of cars from 1960 to 1964 was now complemented by a variety of other Fords, including the Thunderbird and compact Falcon, and from 1962 the midsized Fairlane. So the mainline car grew even more, now riding on a 119 in (3023 mm) wheelbase. The engines were carried over from the 1959 Ford, as was the basic chassis design, but the sheetmetal was modern. The retracting Skyliner hardtop was gone, though the Sunliner convertible remained, and the Fairlane name would last only two years before migrating to a new midsize model.

== 1960 ==
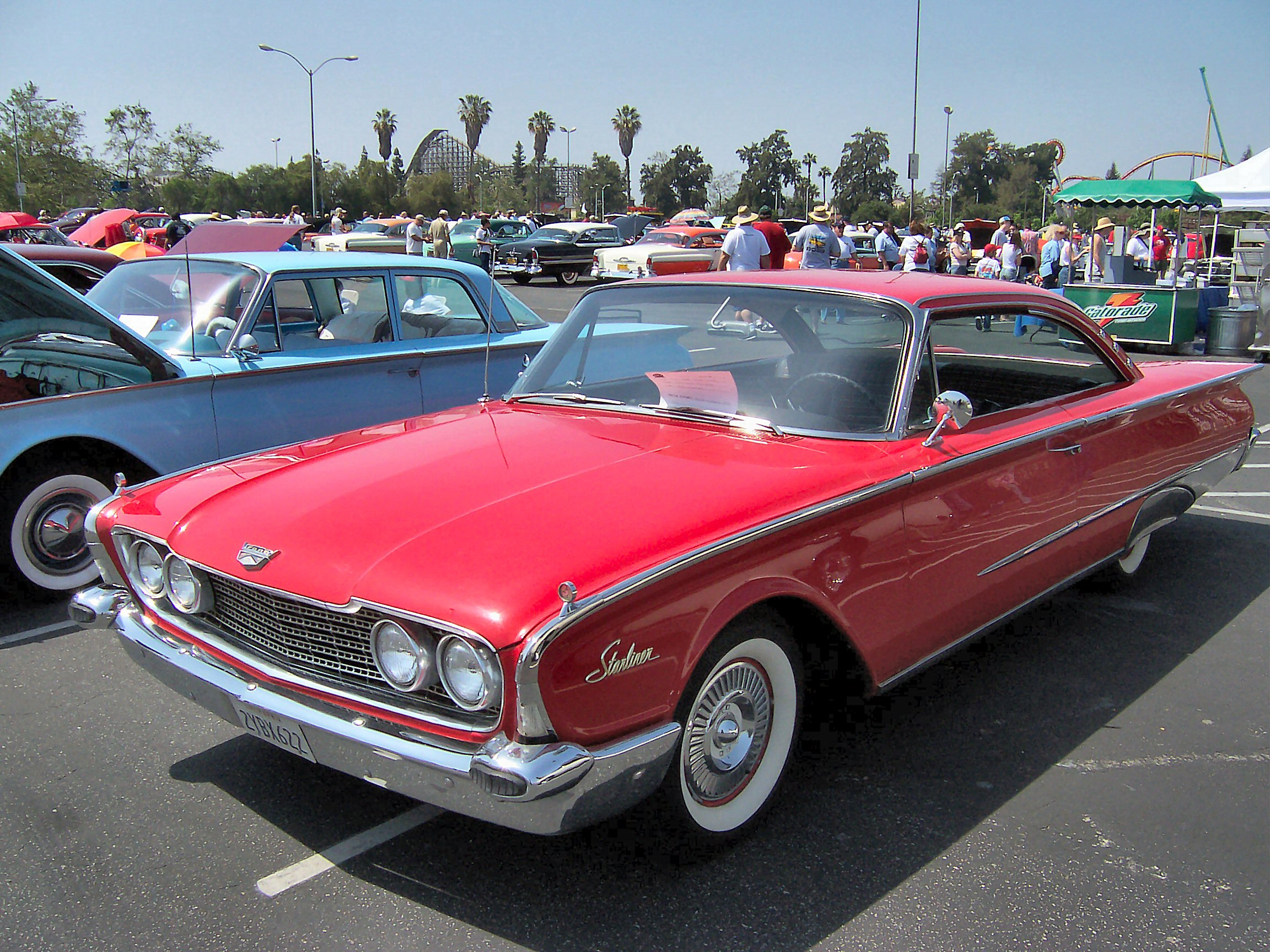
1960 Ford Galaxie Starliner

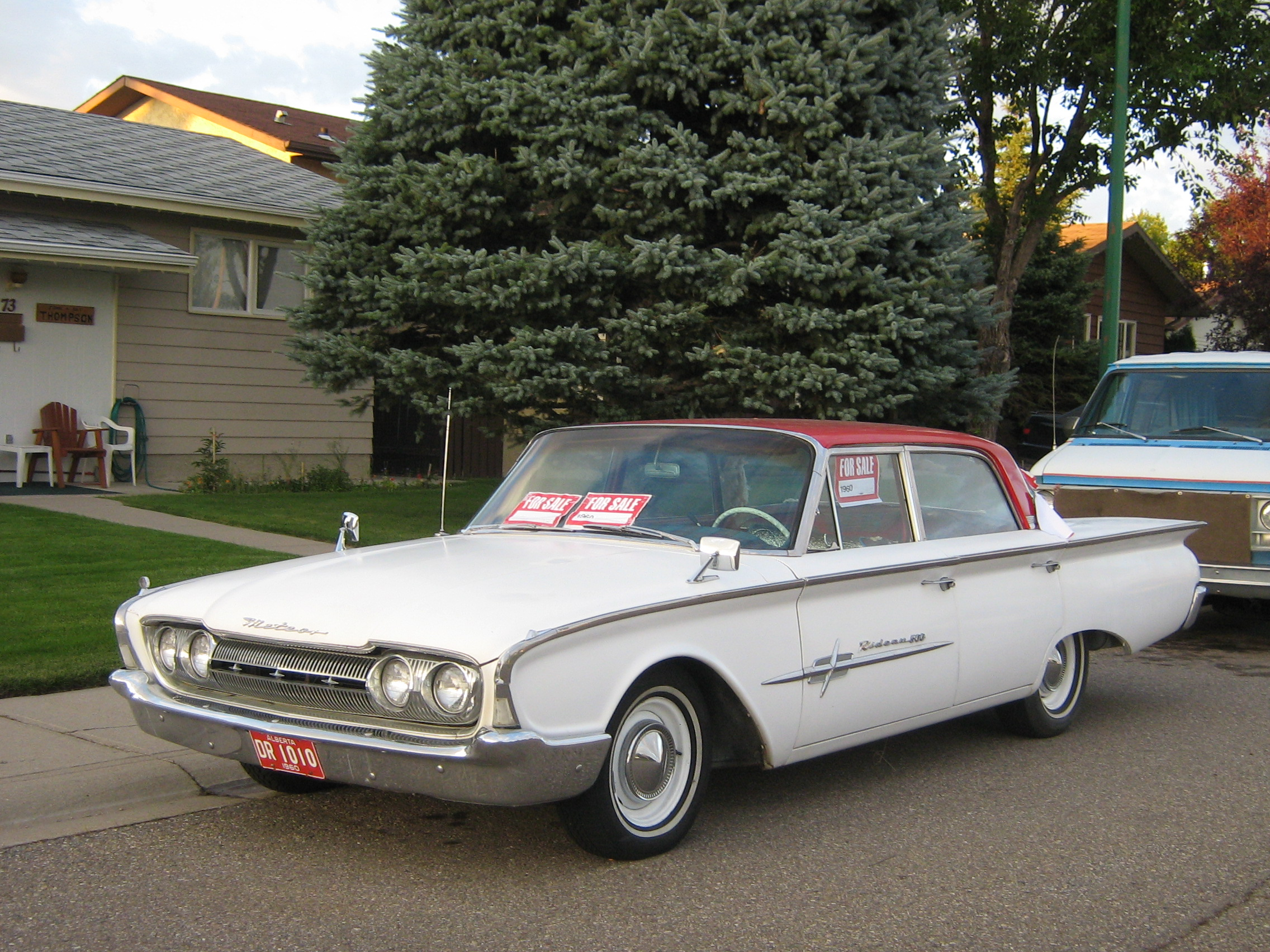
1960 Meteor (Canada)

The 1960 Ford looked all-new with twin headlights riding in a scalloped-square front clip. The Fairlane was now the base model in the full-sized lineup, along with the Fairlane 500, Galaxie and range-topping Starliner. The Station Wagon Series continued with Ranch Wagon, Country Sedan and Country Squire models. The elegant Starliner 2-door hardtop was Ford's choice for NASCAR racing. The 1960 fullsize Fords abandoned the ostentatious ornamentation of the 1950s for a futuristic, sleek look. Round taillights were replaced by half-moon shaped taillights for 1960 only. There were tailfins still, but smaller ones – the focus of Ford's stylists abandoning, as did the rest of the industry, the aviation influences of the previous decade and instead capturing the new obsession – the Space Race. The Galaxie name was particularly appealing to this trend, it seems. Windshield wipers were extended to cover more of the windshield. Ford also introduced the center rear fuel door lid. Engines offered for 1960 were the 223 cubic inch six and 292 & 352 V8s. A midyear introduction was the Hipo 352CI with 360 HP. This was Ford's first engine with over 1HP per cubic inch displacement. With the change in dimensions from 1959, The New York Times described the 1960 full-size Ford as the "longest, lowest, and widest in the fifty-six year history of the Ford Motor Company." The car ran afoul of regulations in many states, where vehicles wider than eighty inches were typically trucks, which had lighting requirements not mandated for passenger cars.

== 1961 ==
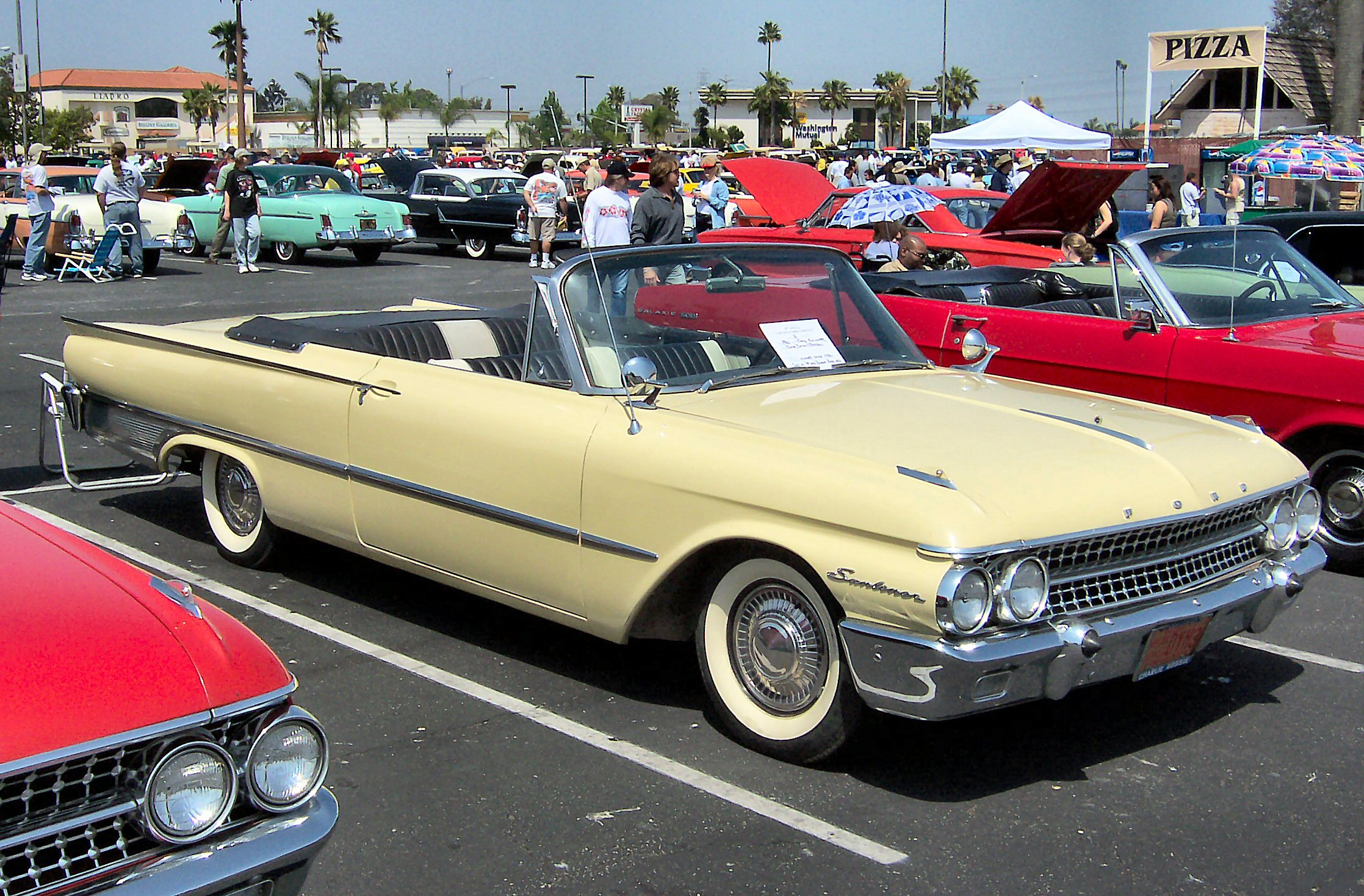
1961 Ford Galaxie Sunliner

The scalloped hood was gone for 1961, as the sheetmetal was revised for a cleaner look. This time, the tailfins were almost gone; replacing them, two giant circular taillights at each rear corner, glowing like an afterburner. Ford was definitely going with the space and science-fiction theme, and with successful results; this style of Galaxie is widely regarded as a classic. A new 390 CID (6.4 L) FE V8 was added with a claimed 401 hp (298 kW) gross output in triple-two-barrel carburetor form. A trunk release button was optional.

== 1962 ==
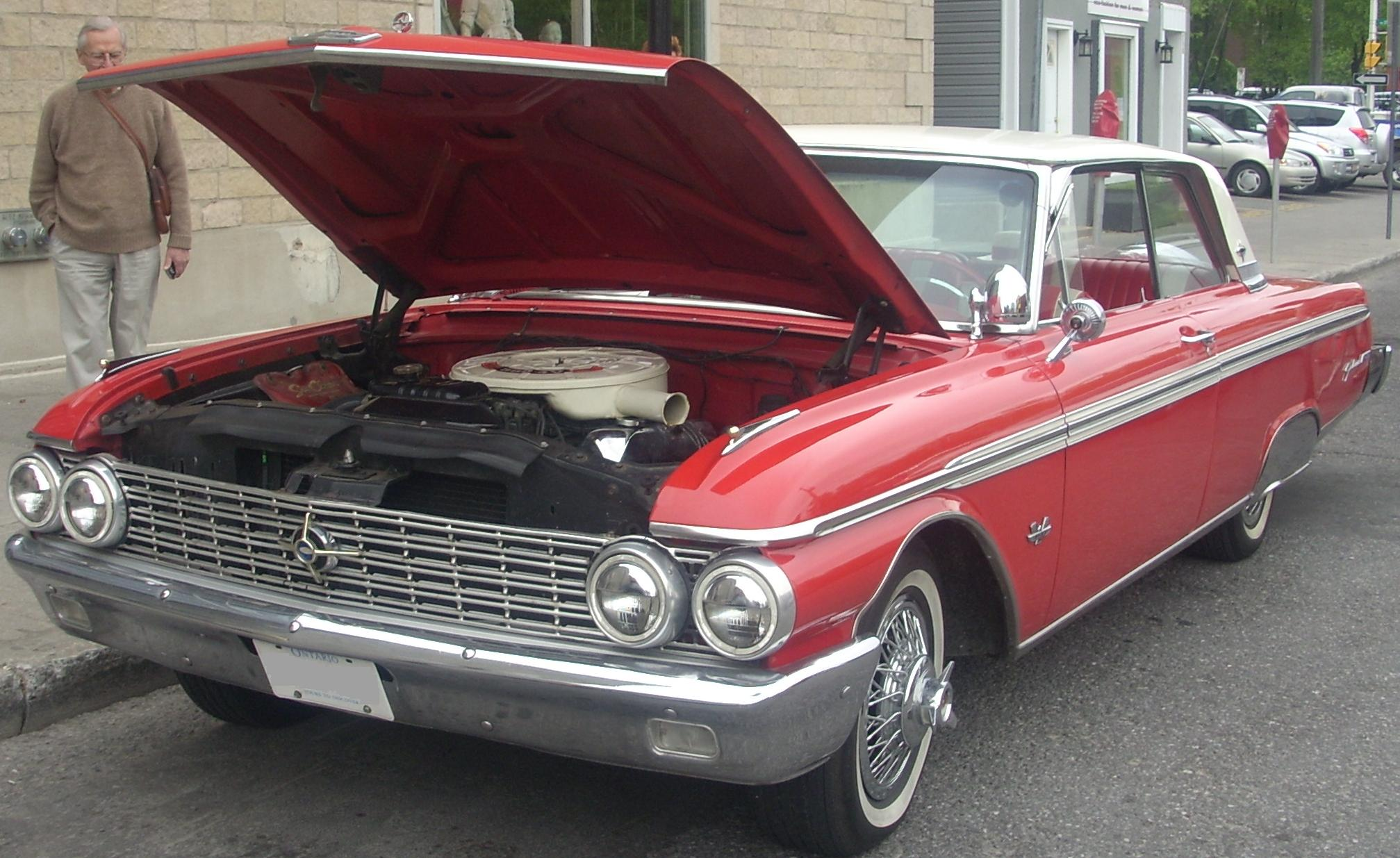
1962 Ford Galaxie

With the Fairlane and Fairlane 500 names shifted to a new intermediate-sized model range for 1962, the full-size Ford lineup consisted of the Galaxie, new Galaxie 500 and Galaxie 500XL models and the Station Wagon Series. Also new was a 406 CID (6.7 L) version of Ford's FE mid-sized V8 rated at 405 hp (302 kW). Bucket seats were everywhere in 1962 – sold as "The Lively Ones", the XL series added buckets to the Sunliner convertible and hardtop coupe. The slow-selling Starliner semi-hardtop coupe was cancelled, leaving Ford no choice than to compete in stock car racing with the Club Victoria, which had a formal roofline. Their top speed was lower than the 1961s because of the inferior aerodynamics. Trying to come up with a quick solution, Ford attempted to enter the Starlift, which was a Sunliner convertible with a removable roof with a curved roofline similar to the 1960–61 Starliner. NASCAR banned the Starlift from competition, and few if any were actually produced. It is said that the windows could not be rolled up on the Starlift when the top was on, as the windows were the stock Sunliner windows which did not fit the roofline.

== 1963 ==
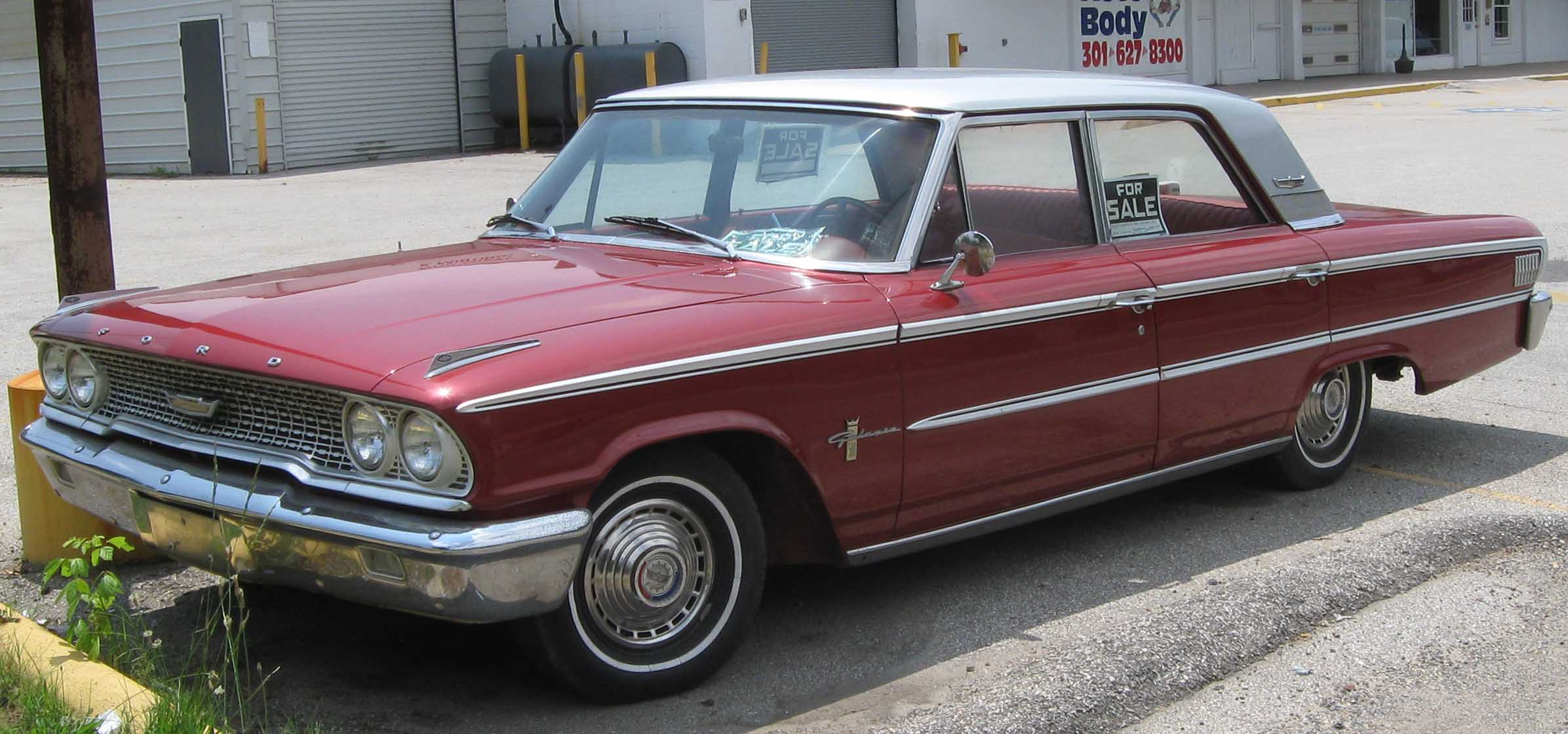
1963 Ford Galaxie 500 Sedan

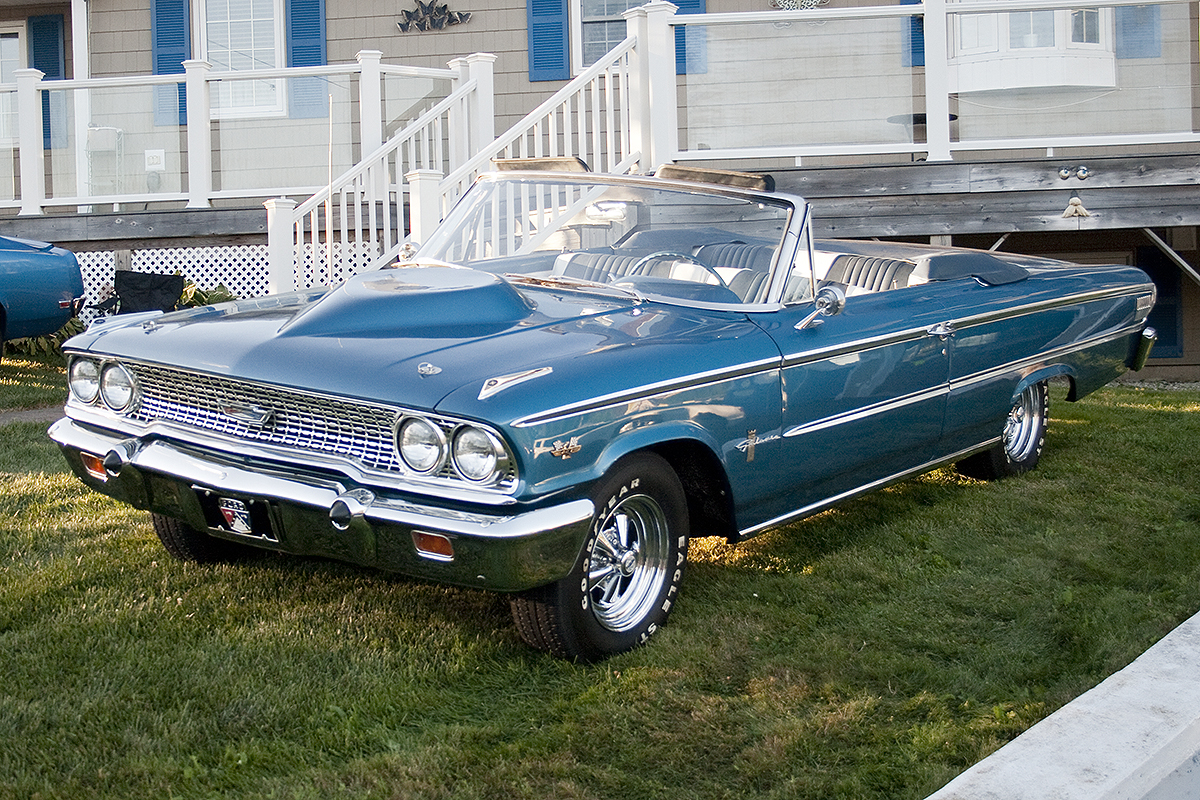
1963 Ford Galaxie 427 Convertible

Ford rolled into 1963 with a NASCAR-winning Galaxie and a 427 CID (7 L) FE V8 sporting either 410 hp (306 kW) or 425 hp (317 kW). A new hardtop coupe body was added to the Galaxie range, and the base model became known as the 300.

The hardtop coupe sported a lower, fastback roofline and was added mid year to improve looks and make the big cars more competitive on the NASCAR tracks. This 63½ model was called the "Sports Roof" hardtop.

Ford took the 427 CID (7.0 L) equipped Galaxie to the dragstrip in serious fashion beginning in 1963, building a number of lightweight cars just for that purpose. They featured fiberglass fenders, doors, trunklid and aluminum bumpers. Rated conservatively at 425 hp (317 kW), this engine also featured in Carroll Shelby's final incarnation of the AC Cobra.

The Ranch Wagon name was transferred to the Ford Fairlane range for 1963, leaving only the Country Sedan and Country Squire models in the full-size Ford Station Wagon Series.

== 1964 ==
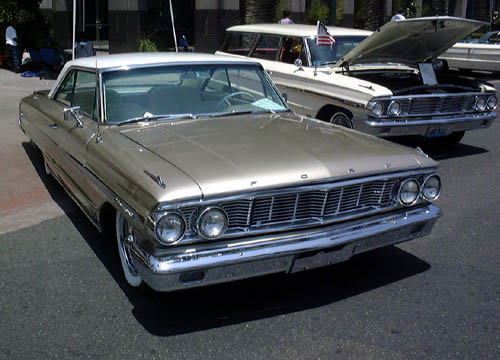
1964 Ford Galaxies

The final year of the 1960 full-size Fords was 1964, with the 300 base model again using the Custom name. The base Galaxie was now called "Custom 500." The Sports Roof was continued for all hardtop coupes. In addition, new sloped rooflines were introduced for all non-wagon '64 big Fords. Interior trim was new, including new thin-shell bucket seats for all XL models. The instrument panel remained the same, except for the ignition switch, which was moved from left of the steering column, to the right. External styling was once again refreshed, with a more sculptured body that was supposed to reduce drag at high speeds, no doubt done for NASCAR.

Under the hood, the 427 CID (7.0 L) engine carried on the high performance duties. Ford again took the 427-equipped Galaxie to the racetracks in serious fashion in 1964, building a number of lightweight, fiberglass equipped cars just for that purpose. These competed with success not only in North America but also in the United Kingdom. Initial doubts as to their competitiveness in Britain were short-lived; despite their great size and weight compared to the opposition, the Ford 427 engine gave them a competitive power-to-weight ratio and the handling was better than might have been supposed. They were raced in Europe reasonably successfully.

Late in the year Ford introduced their new engine challenger, the SOHC 427 Cammer. Though it is not documented, it is believed a few may have found their way onto the street. (This engine was only available to racers through the dealer network or from the manufacturer; none were ever factory installed.) Rated at over 600 hp (447 kW), this is possibly the most powerful engine ever fitted to a production car by an American manufacturer. NASCAR changed the rules, however, requiring (instead of hundreds) thousands of production examples in service to qualify for the next season, and Ford decided against producing the Cammer in that quantity. Fears of liability concerns and the bad publicity possibilities in giving the public a car that was so dangerously powerful are often cited as reasons, but it might simply have been that Ford doubted that an engine so unsuited to street use could sell in such numbers.

The 1964s represent a high point in early 1960s Ford quality, durability, and styling. They were not only enormously popular, but proved to be so durable that many continued to run well past the 100,000 mile mark without a major overhaul. Holman & Moody continued to supply high-performance equipment for the big '64 Fords, giving them wins at NASCAR.
