= Ford 300 =

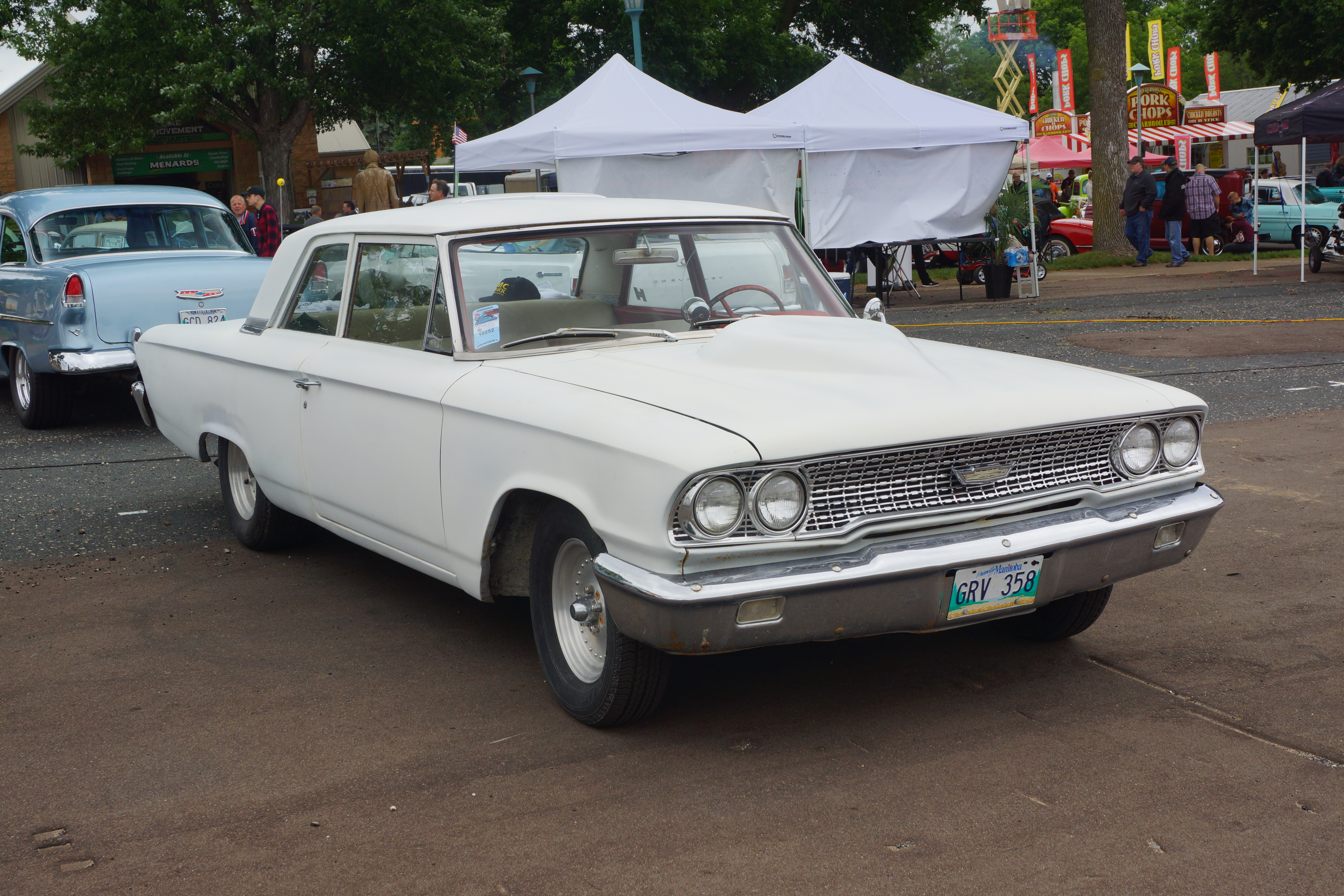
- 1963 Ford 300 2-Door Sedan. This example is highly modified for racing, note the "teardrop" hood and non-stock wheels

Overview
- Production: 1963

Body and chassis
- Body style: 2-door sedan 4-door sedan
- Related: Ford Galaxie

Powertrain
- Engine: 223 cu in (3.7 L) Mileage Maker I6; 260 cu in (4.3 L) Windsor V8; 289 cu in (4.7 L) Windsor V8; 352 cu in (5.8 L) FE series V8; 390 cu in (6.4 L) FE series V8; 406 cu in (6.7 L) FE series V8; 427 cu in (7.0 L) FE series V8
- Transmission: 2-speed Ford-O-Matic automatic 3-speed Cruise-O-Matic automatic 3-speed manual

Dimensions
- Wheelbase: 119 in (3,023 mm)
- Length: 209.9 in (5,331 mm)
- Width: 81.5 in (2,070 mm)

The Ford 300 is an American automobile manufactured by Ford exclusively for the 1963 model year. It served as the foundational trim level within the full-size 1963 Ford lineup, positioned below the Galaxie, Galaxie 500, and Galaxie 500XL models. Distinguished by its minimal chrome trim and lack of luxury features, it was comparable in trim level to the Chevrolet Biscayne.

The Ford 300 gained popularity in police and taxi fleets, due to a base price more than $100 lower than comparable models in the base Galaxie series. Private customers were also drawn to its affordability and economic performance, as it offered the spaciousness of a full-sized automobile as a primary selling point.

Identified by the "Ford 300" badge on each front fender, positioned just behind the wheel wells, and featuring "F-O-R-D" lettering in small block font on the trunk lid, this series exclusively offered 2- or 4-door pillared sedan configurations.

An aspect of the Ford 300's history revolves around the availability of the big-block FE-series V8 engines, including the 427 cubic inch engine delivering up to 425 horsepower. When paired with a manual transmission, these cars often found use in the realm of drag racing, owing to their relatively lightweight build.

A unique Ford 300 2-door sedan variant was marketed by Tasca Motors of Providence, Rhode Island. Distinguishing itself with additional chrome embellishments borrowed from the Galaxie and XL models, as well as a two-tone paint combinations.

In 1964, the Ford 300 was succeeded by the Custom series.

== Gallery ==
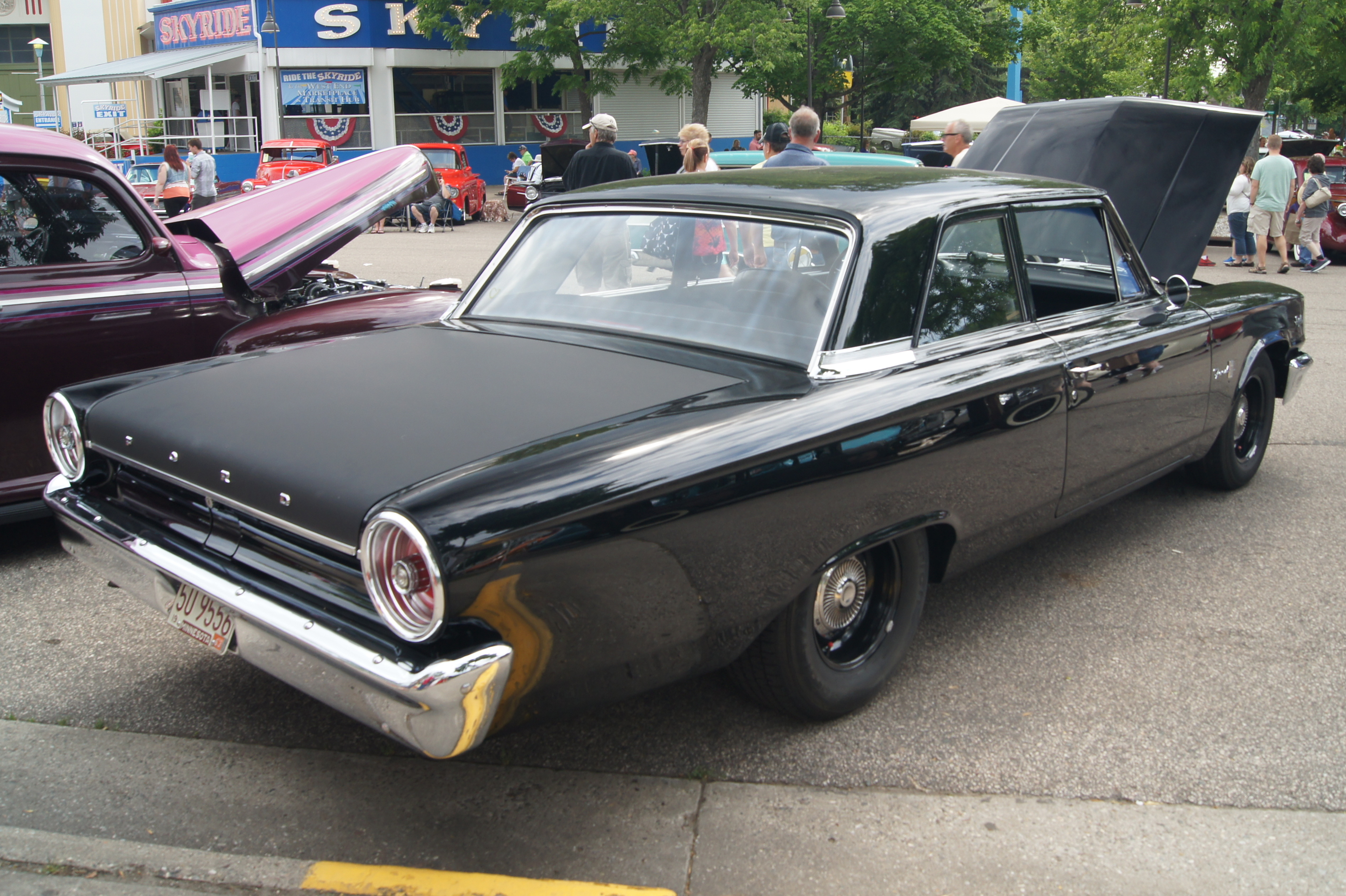
1963 Ford 300 2-Door Sedan

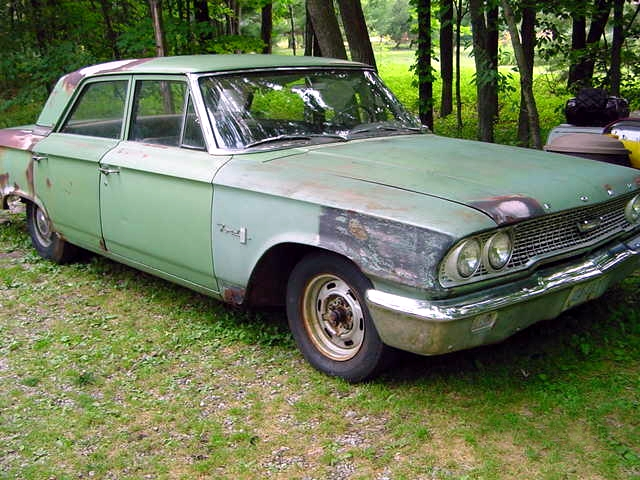
A weathered Ford 300 4-Door Sedan. In the absence of a front fender badge, this vehicle likely came equipped with the standard OHV inline-6 engine.
