= Ford Custom =

Ford car model

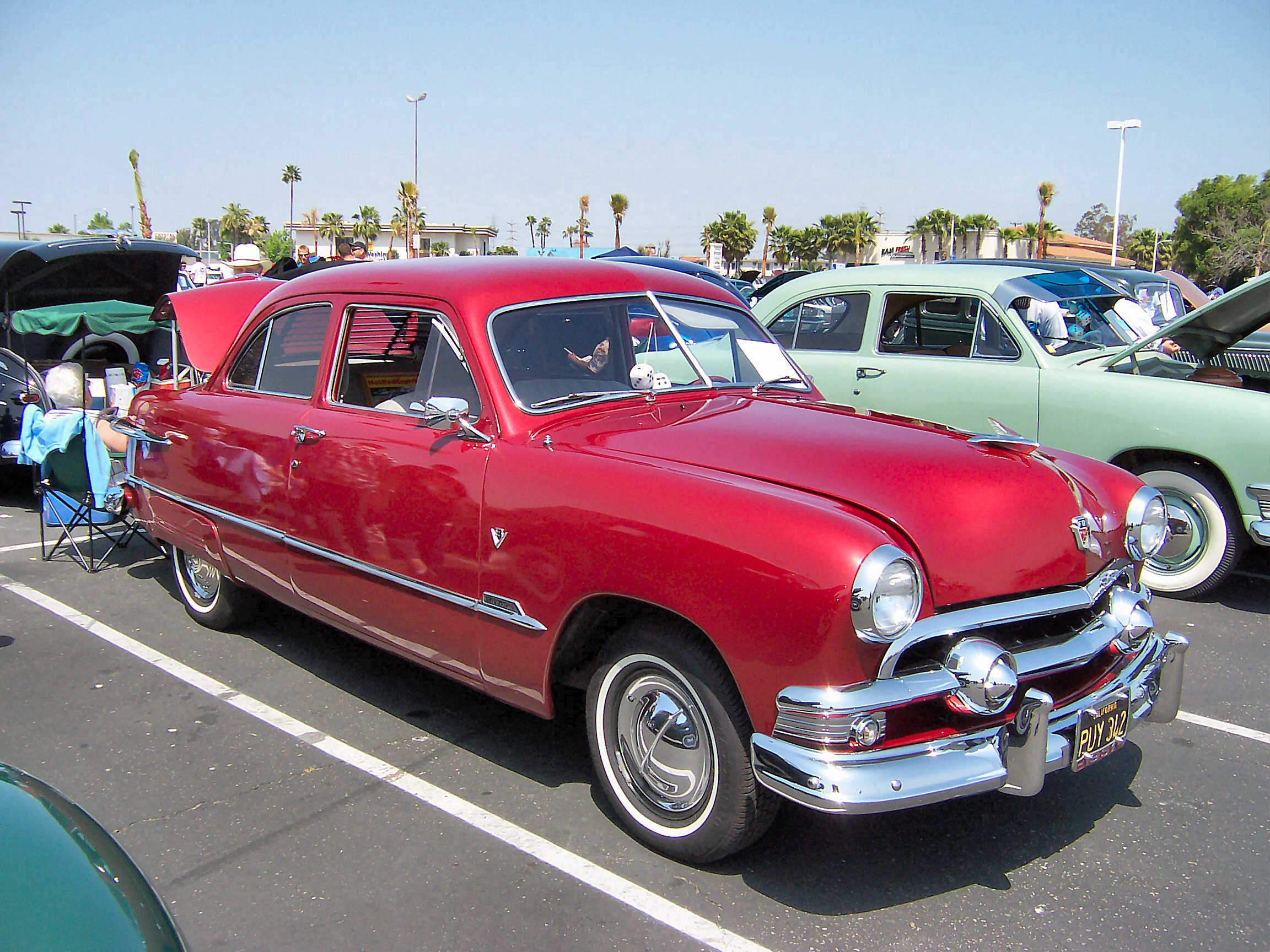
1951 Ford Custom Deluxe Tudor

The Ford Custom is an automobile which was produced by Ford in the United States, Canada and Australia in certain years from 1949 to 1981.

== Custom and Custom Deluxe (1949–1951) ==
For the 1949 model year, the Custom nameplate was used for the top trim level in Ford's automobile range. It was part of Ford's first complete redesign of their cars post-WW2. In 1950, it had a 114-inch wheelbase and 196.8-inch overall length. For 1950 the name was changed to Custom Deluxe and then to Customline for 1952 when it moved to the midrange position between the new Mainline and Crestline models.

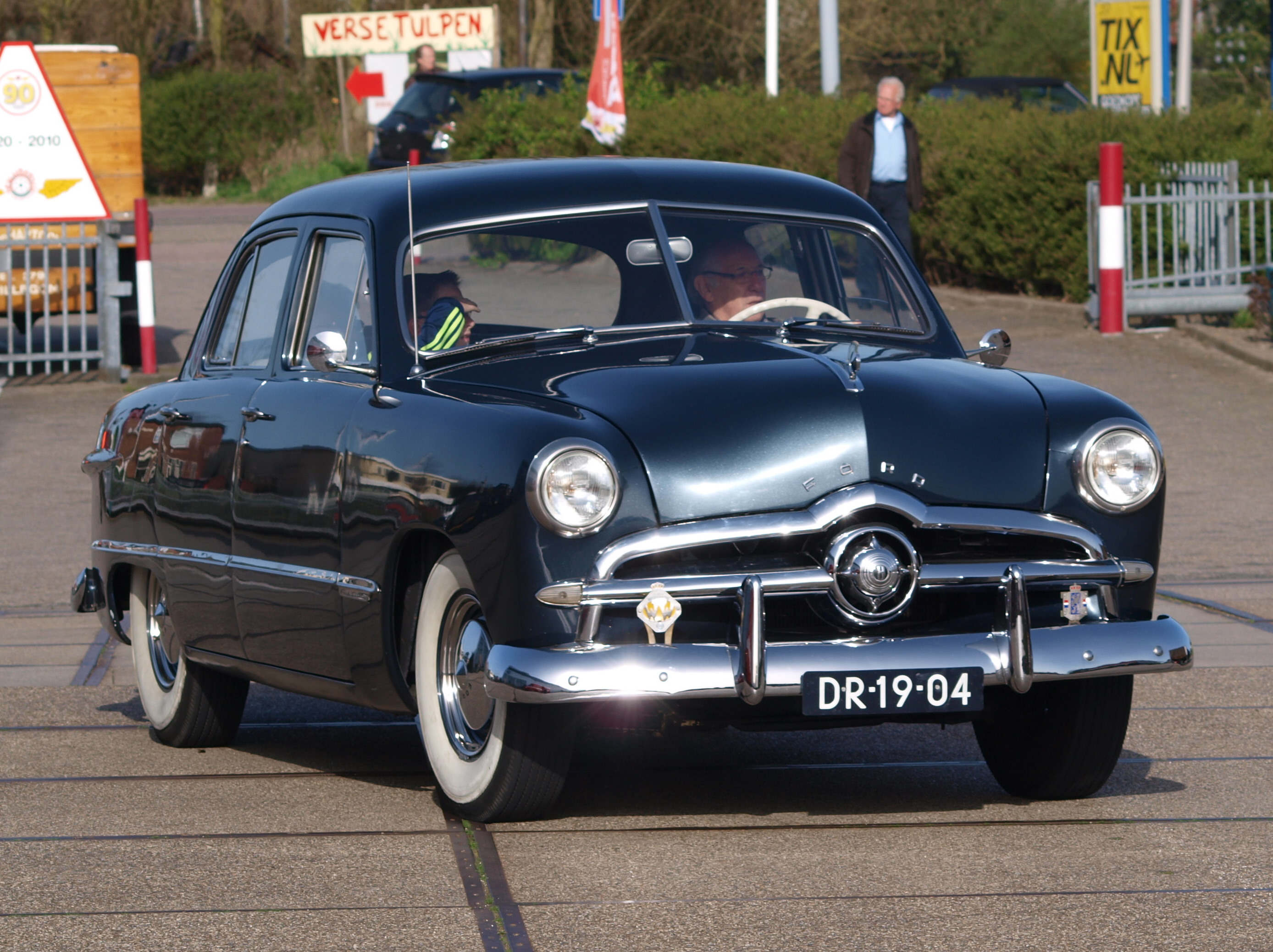
1949 Ford Custom Fordor Sedan

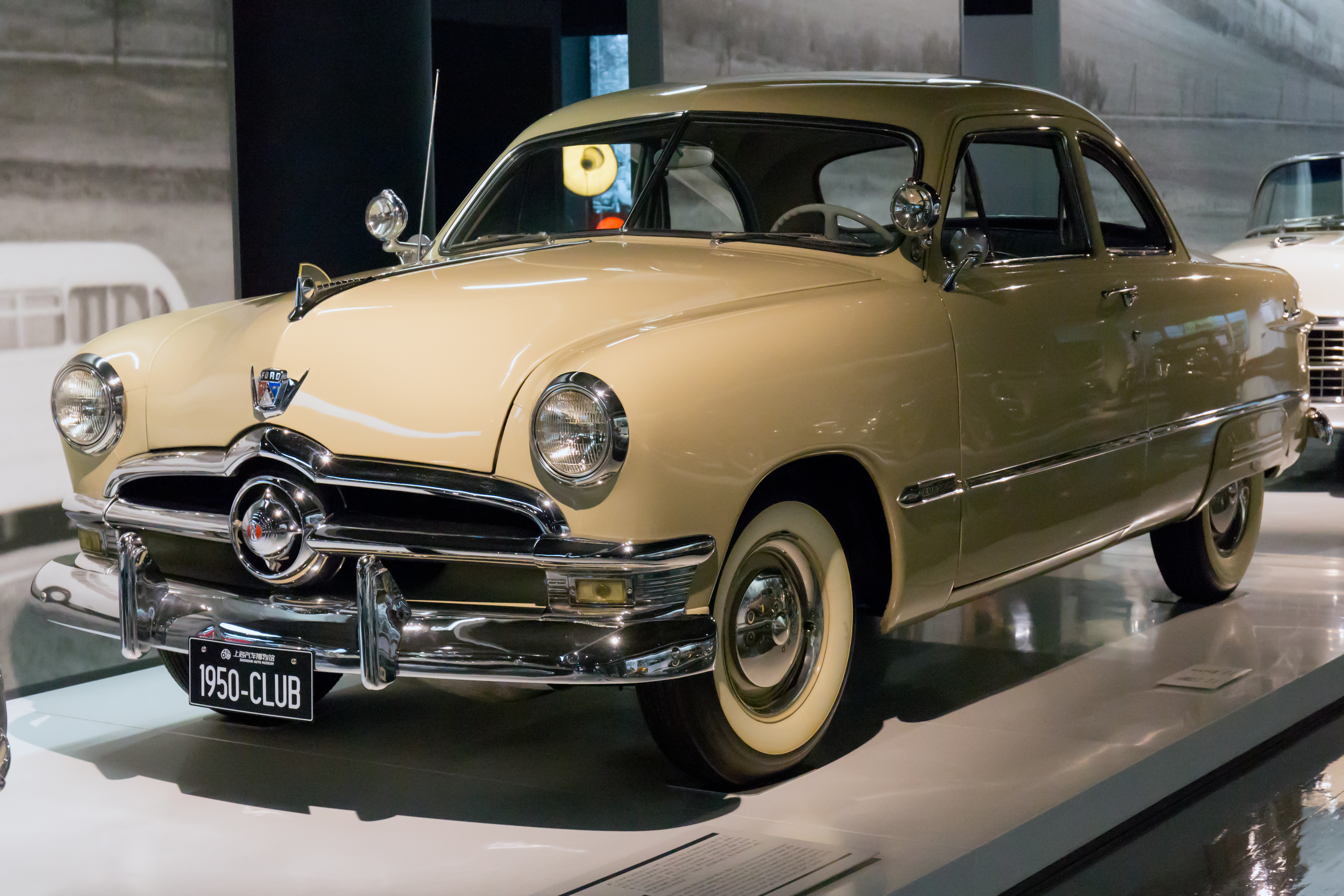
1950 Ford Custom Deluxe Coupe

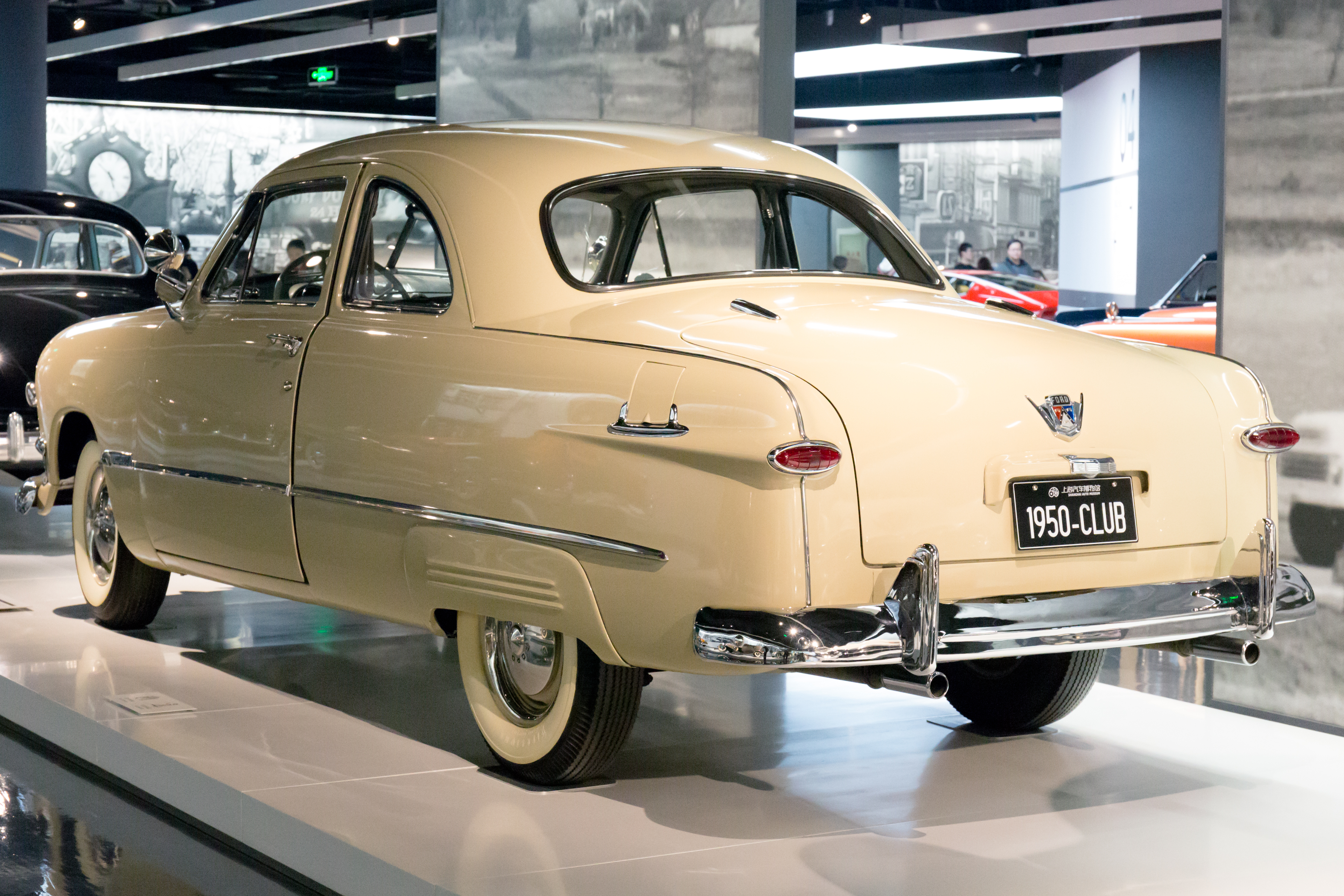
1950 Ford Custom Deluxe Coupe

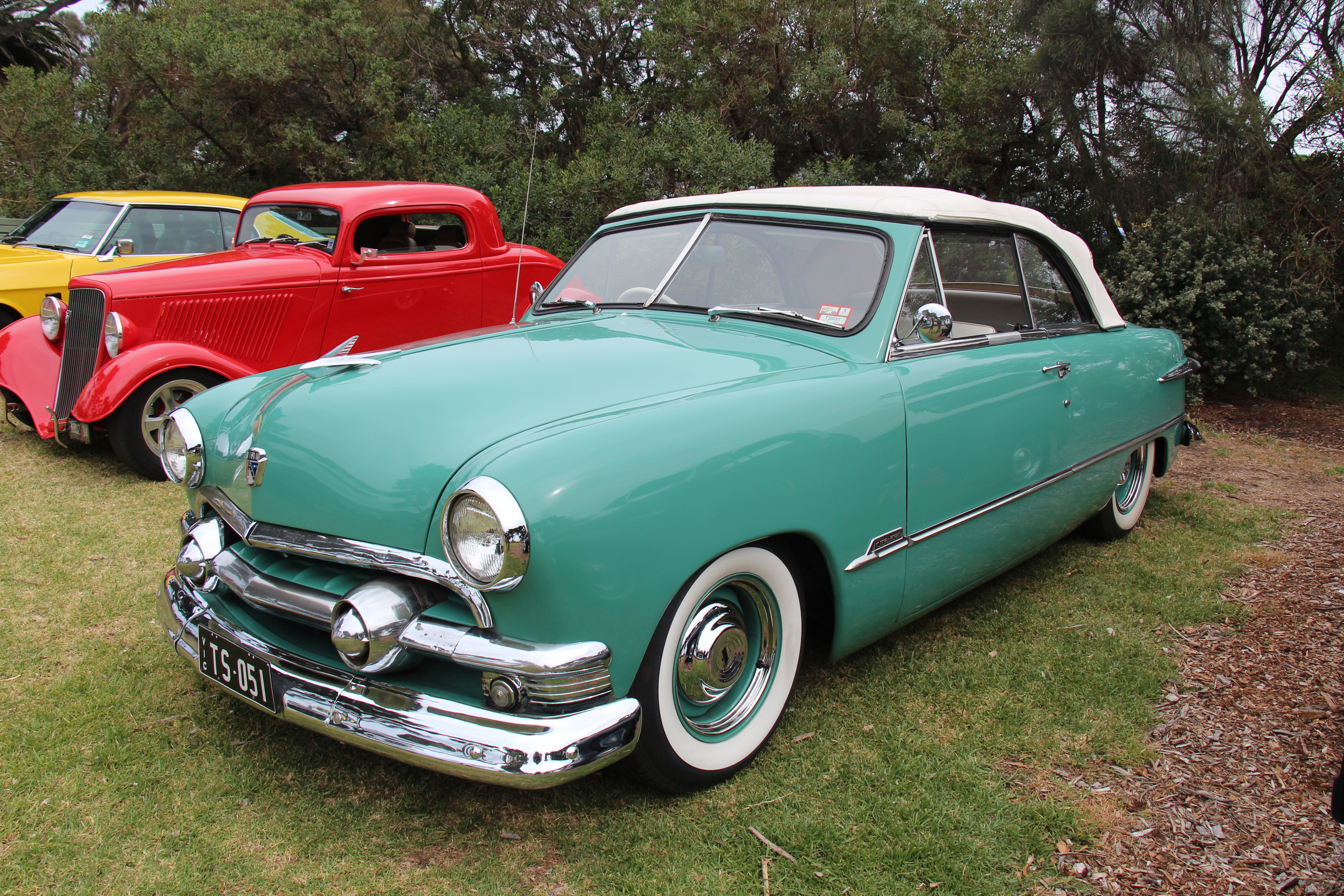
1951 Custom Deluxe convertible

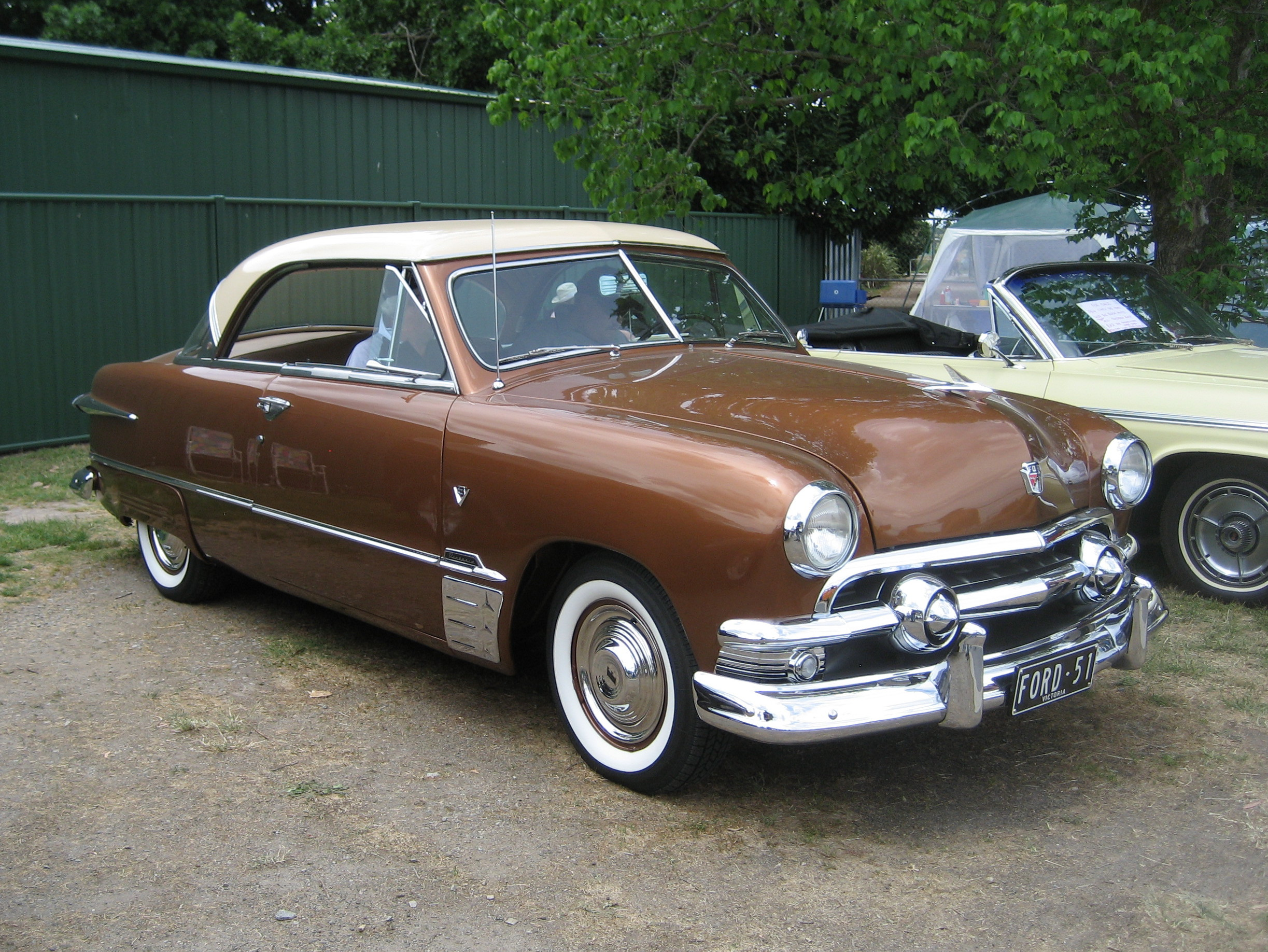
1951 Custom Deluxe Victoria

== Custom and Custom 300 (1957–1959) ==
The Custom name returned for the 1957 model year along with a new Custom 300 series, these two models sitting below the Fairlane and Fairlane 500. The base Custom was the bottom-rung model, whose primary customers were fleet buyers. The Custom 300 was a step up and intended for value-conscious customers. The Custom and Custom 300 generally replaced the fleet-oriented Mainline and mid-range Customline, respectively, for 1957.

The Custom 300 became the base model for 1958, but was dropped from the range for 1960.

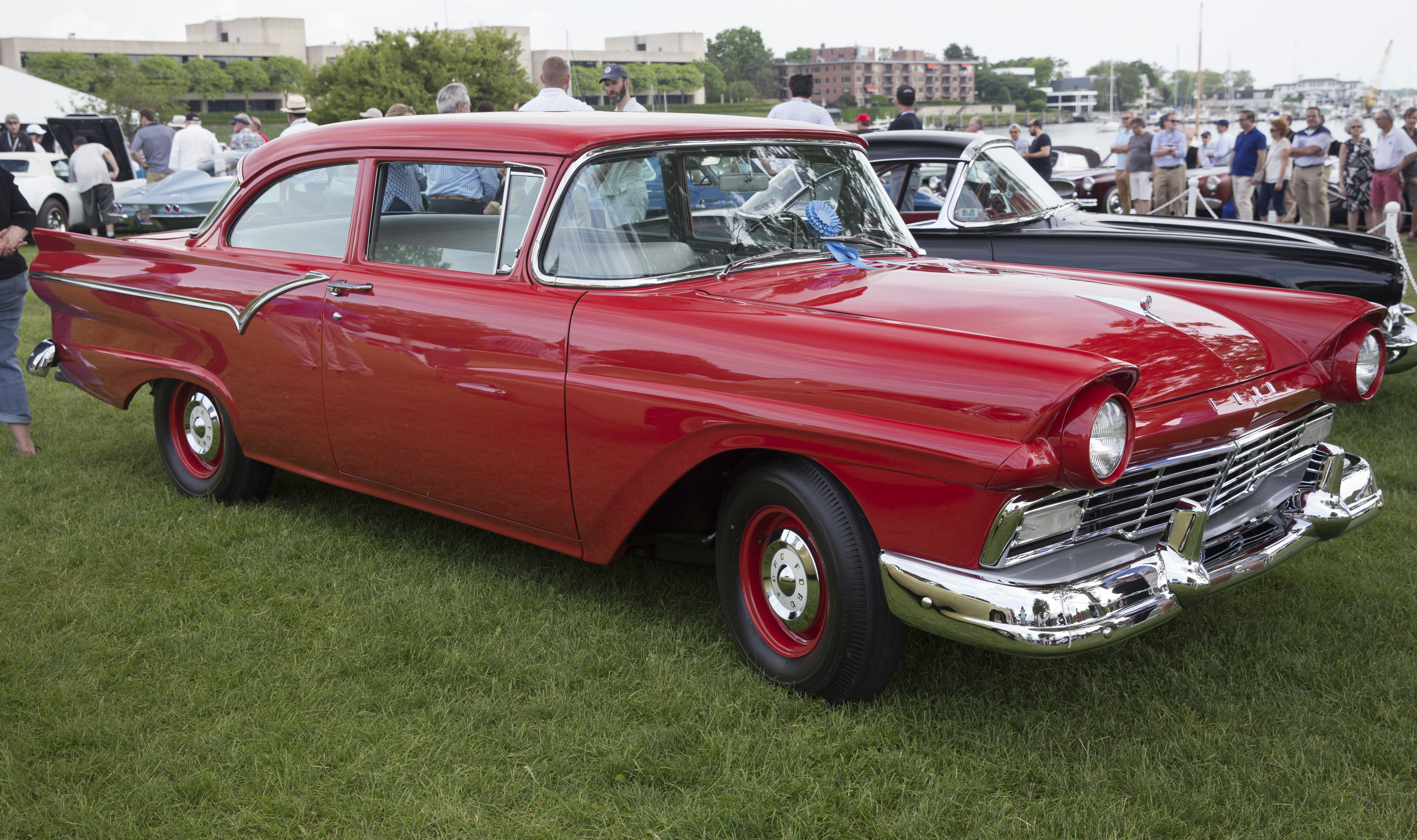
1957 Ford Custom Tudor Sedan

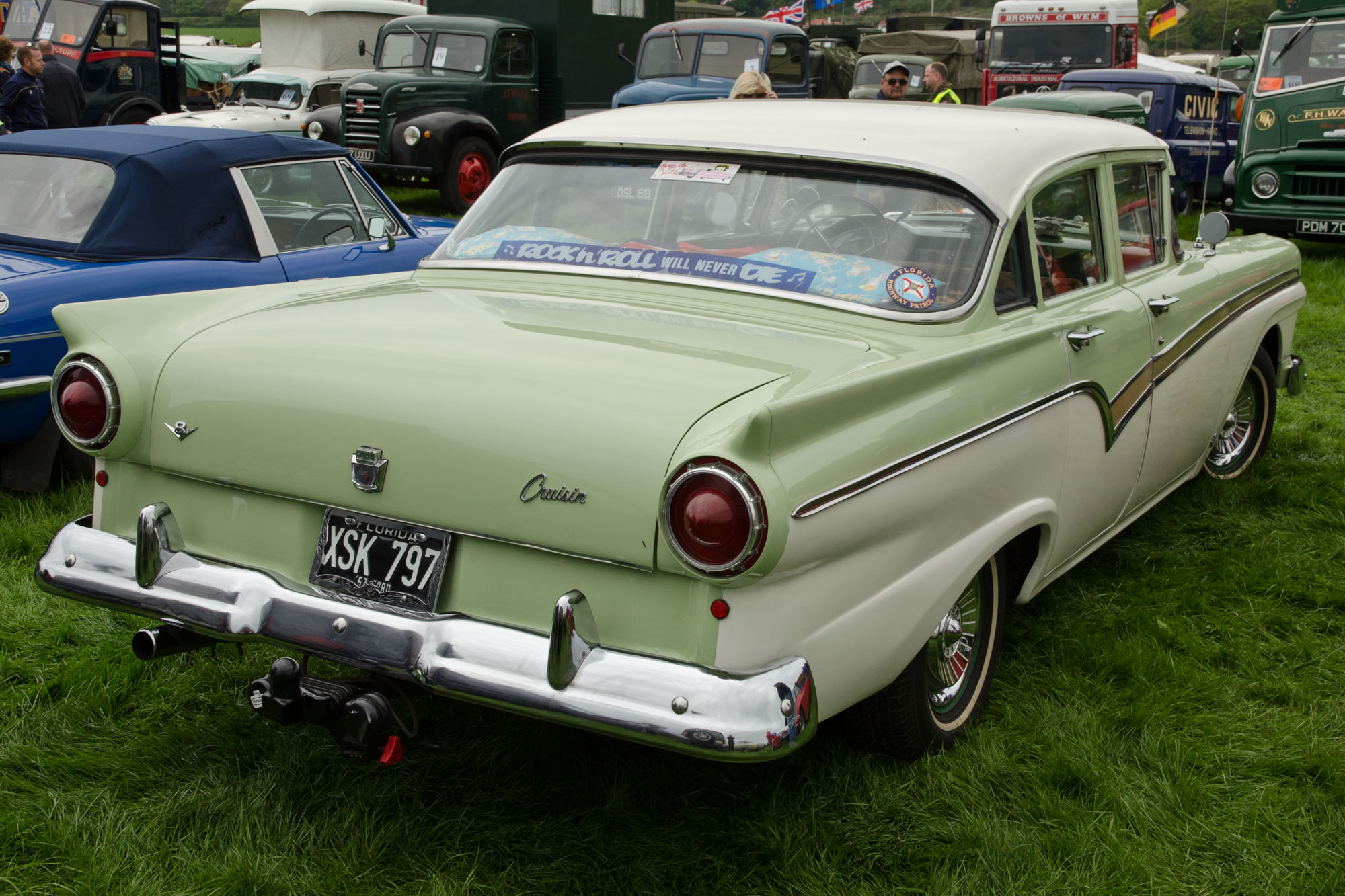
1957 Ford Custom 300 Fordor Sedan

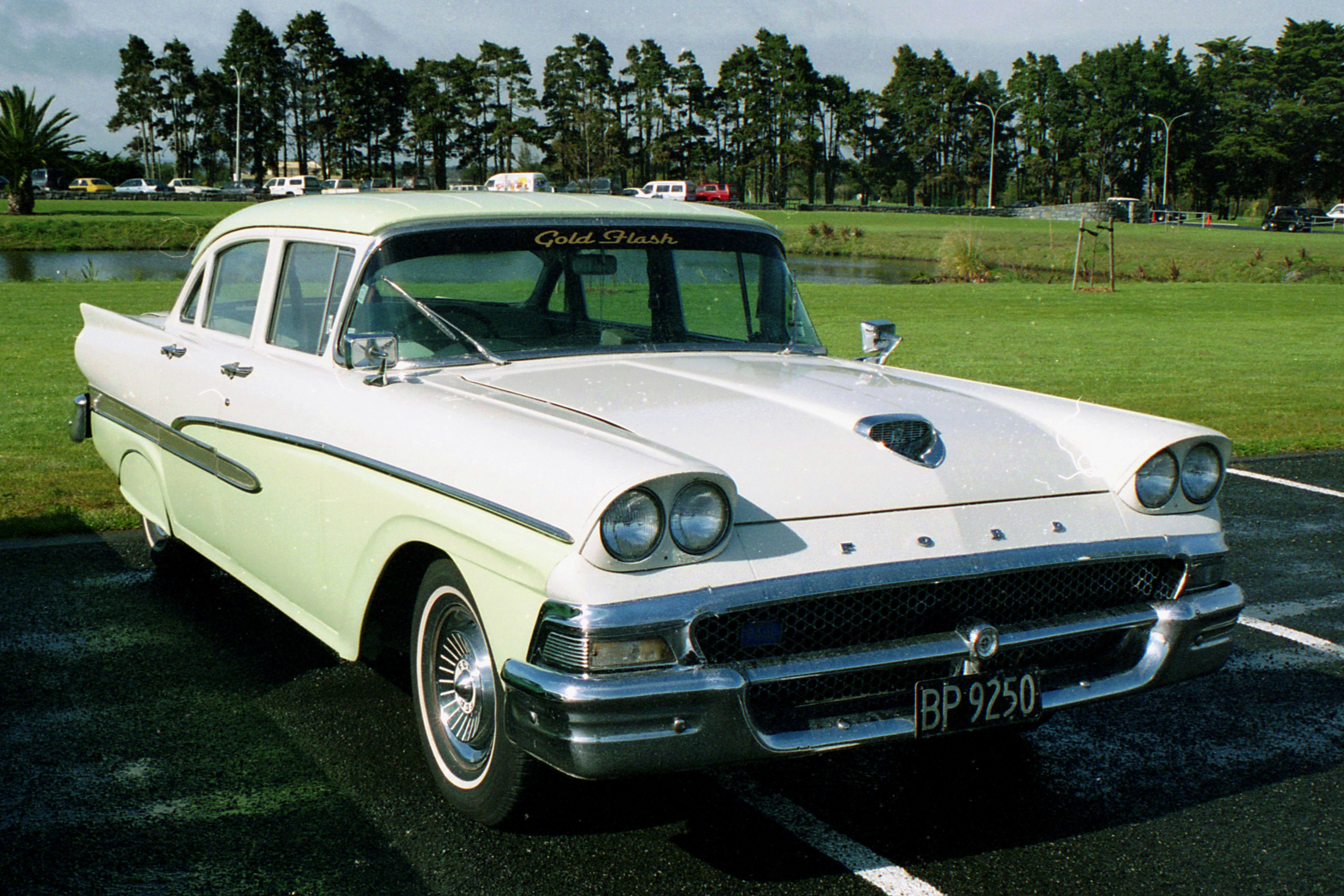
1958 Ford Custom 300 Fordor Sedan

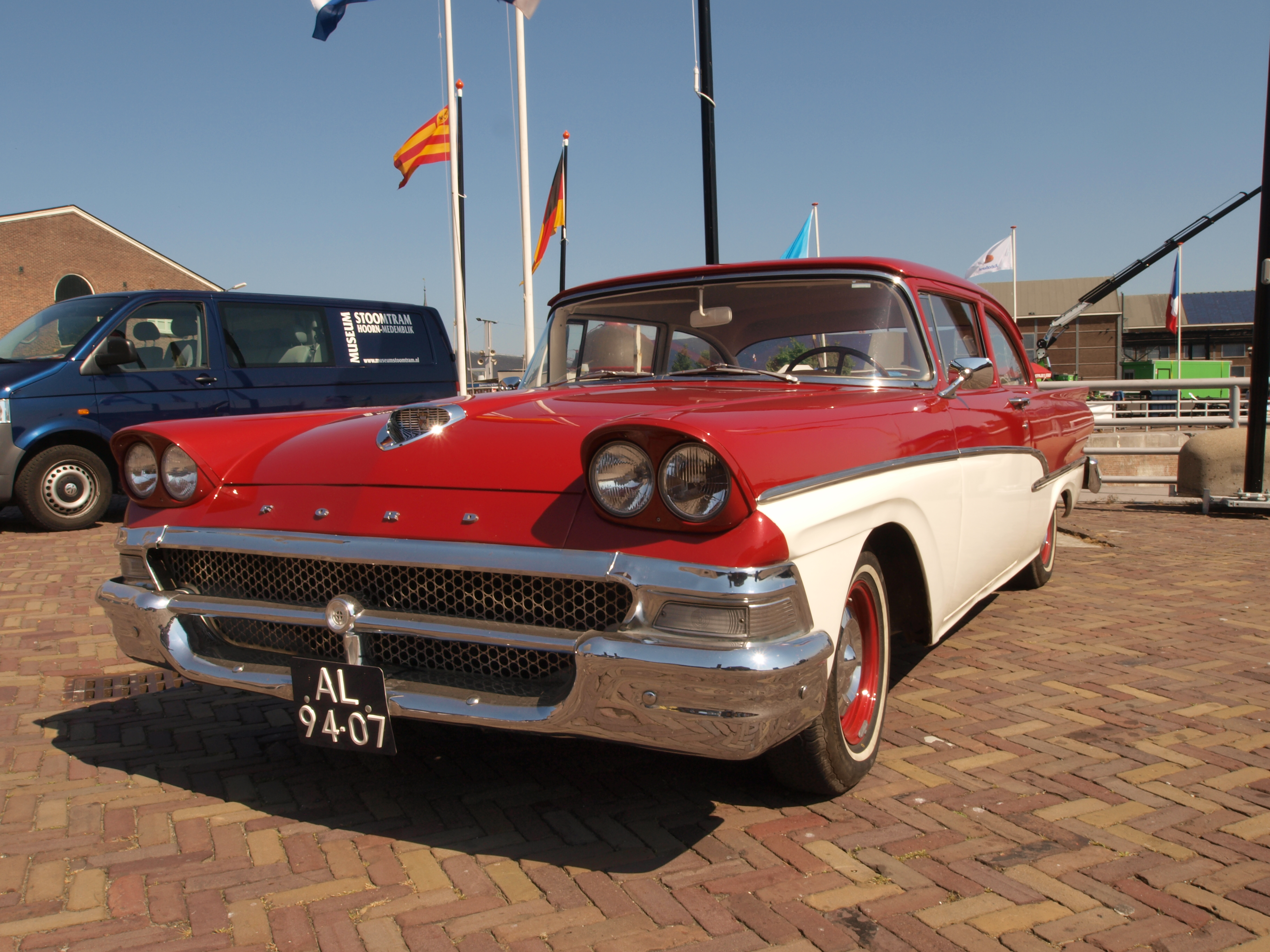
1958 Custom 300 Tudor Sedan

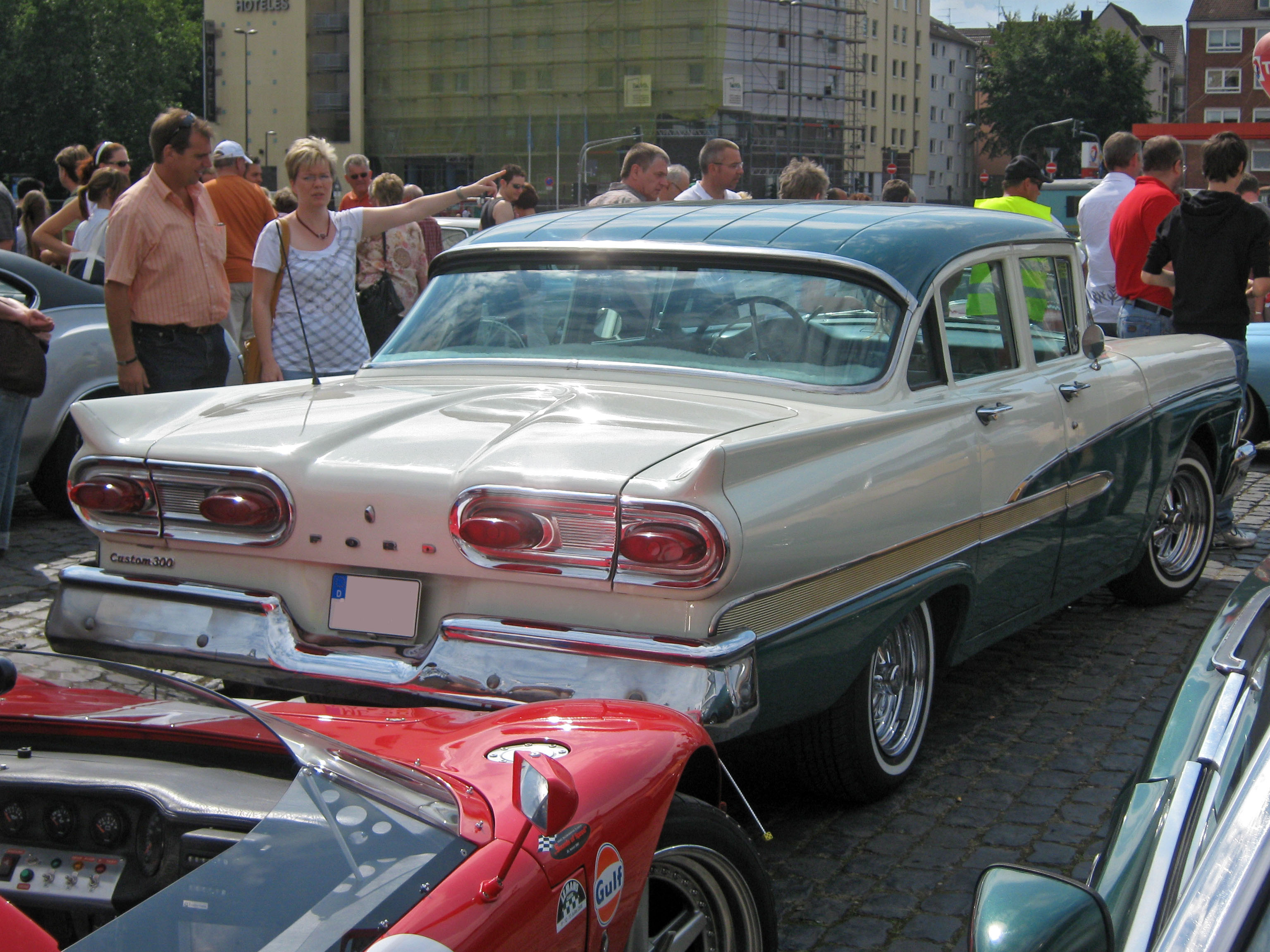
1958 Ford Custom 300 V8

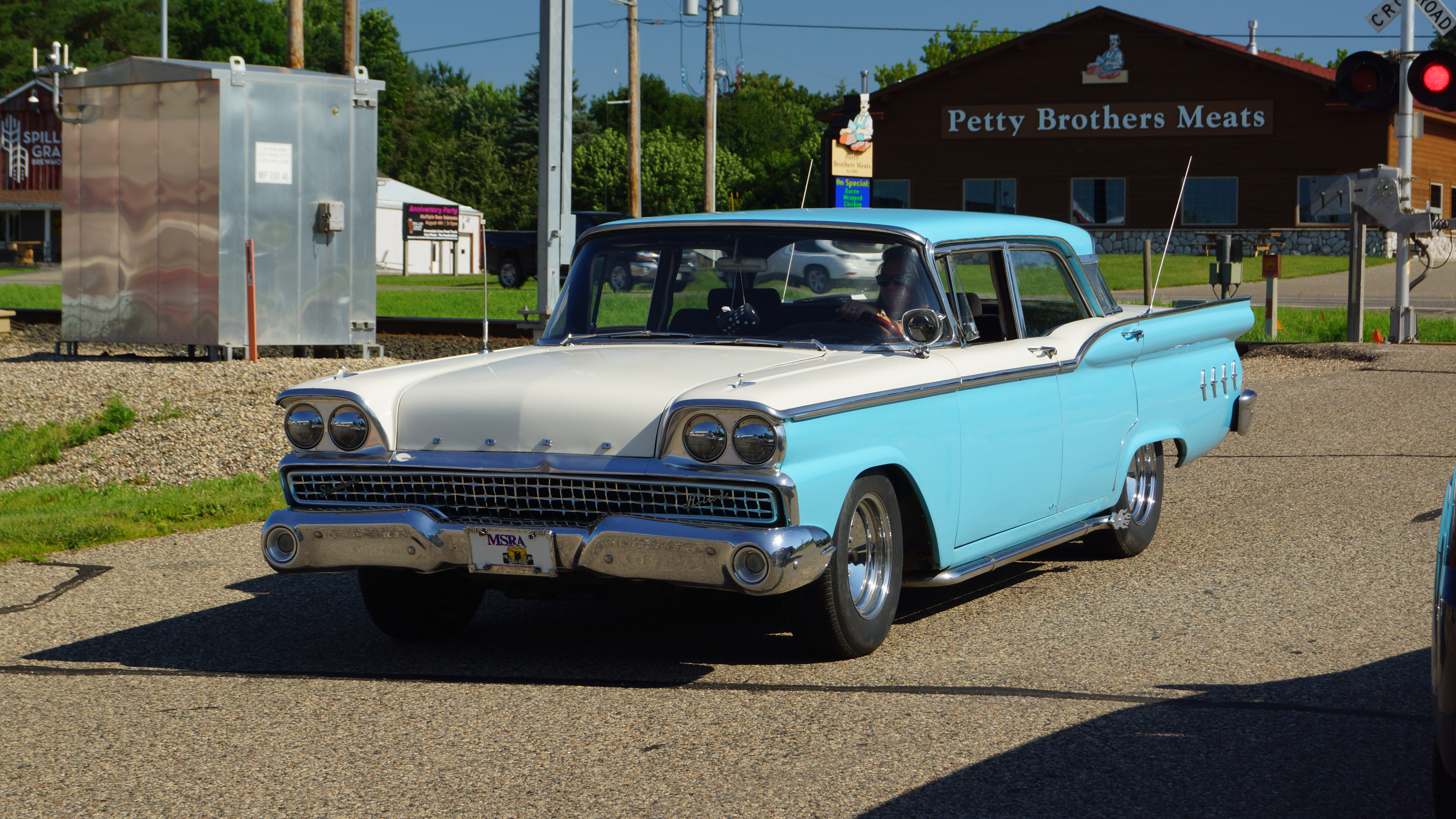
1959 Ford Custom 300 Fordor Sedan

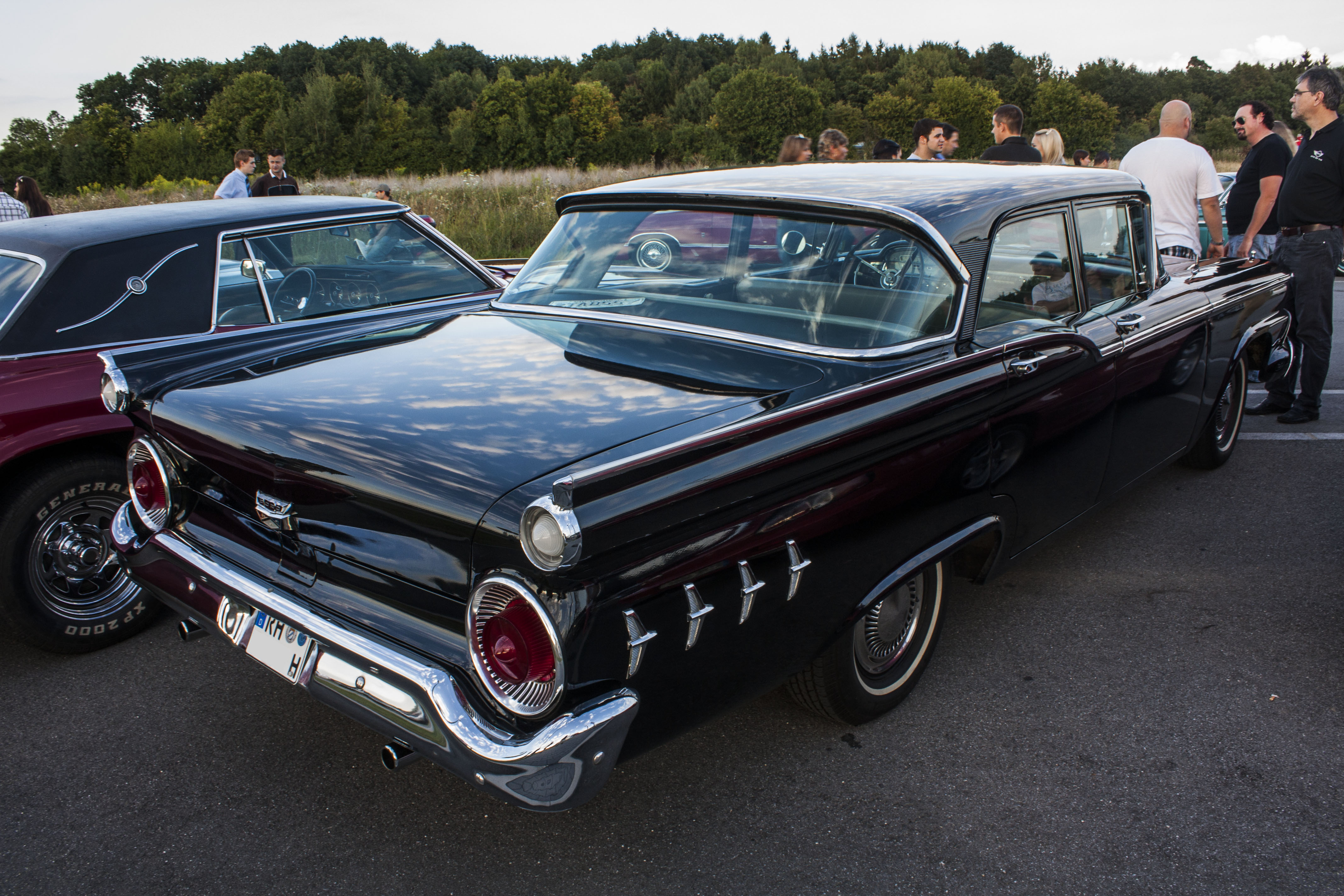
1959 Ford Custom 300 Fordor Sedan

== Custom and Custom 500 (1964–1981) ==
From 1960 through 1963, the Custom nameplate and its numbered variants were absent from the lineup, replaced by the Fairlane and base Galaxie models. For 1963, base-model Fords were badged "Ford 300".

The Custom nameplate reappeared in 1964, once again on the economy line of models. As in 1957 and 1958, the Custom range consisted of two series: a base Custom range and a slightly better-trimmed Custom 500 series. Most Customs were sold to police and taxi fleets during the 1960s - although anyone who wanted basic, no-frills transportation in a full-sized car could purchase one - while the Custom 500 was marketed toward budget-conscious buyers who wanted a low-cost automobile but not a stripped model. Generally, the Custom 500 models were differentiated from their less-expensive stablemates by chrome fender trim, roof drip moldings, carpeting (although by the late 1960s, even base Customs had carpeting), upgraded cloth-and-vinyl upholstery, and minor convenience items.

Most Customs and Custom 500s were fitted either with a base inline six-cylinder engine or a small-block V8 engine (289 cid in the early years, up to 351 by the mid- to late-1970s), although the full range of V8 engines, up to the 425-horsepower 427 V8, and transmissions (from overdrive and 4-speed manual to SelectShift automatic) were available for law enforcement and performance-oriented customers who wanted the lightest car possible. As late as 1972, a powertrain combination of a six-cylinder engine and three-speed manual transmission was standard on the Custom and Custom 500 range; all V8-powered Customs had SelectShift made standard for the 1972 model year. Six cylinder engines and manual transmissions were dropped in 1973; all full-sized Fords from 1973 onward, including the Custom 500, had a V8 engine (351 cubic inches at its smallest) and SelectShift transmission standard.

The Custom was dropped after the 1972 model year, while the Custom 500 continued. For 1975, consumer-market full-size Fords were consolidated under the LTD nameplate, with the Custom 500 only available for fleet customers in the US. The Custom 500 continued to be sold to retail customers in Canada through 1981. In the United States, the Custom 500 was replaced by a LTD "S" variant of the new, downsized Panther platform .

The companion station wagon series sold with Custom and Custom 500 trim was the Ranch Wagon. Like the coupe and sedan models, these cars were intended for fleet buyers.

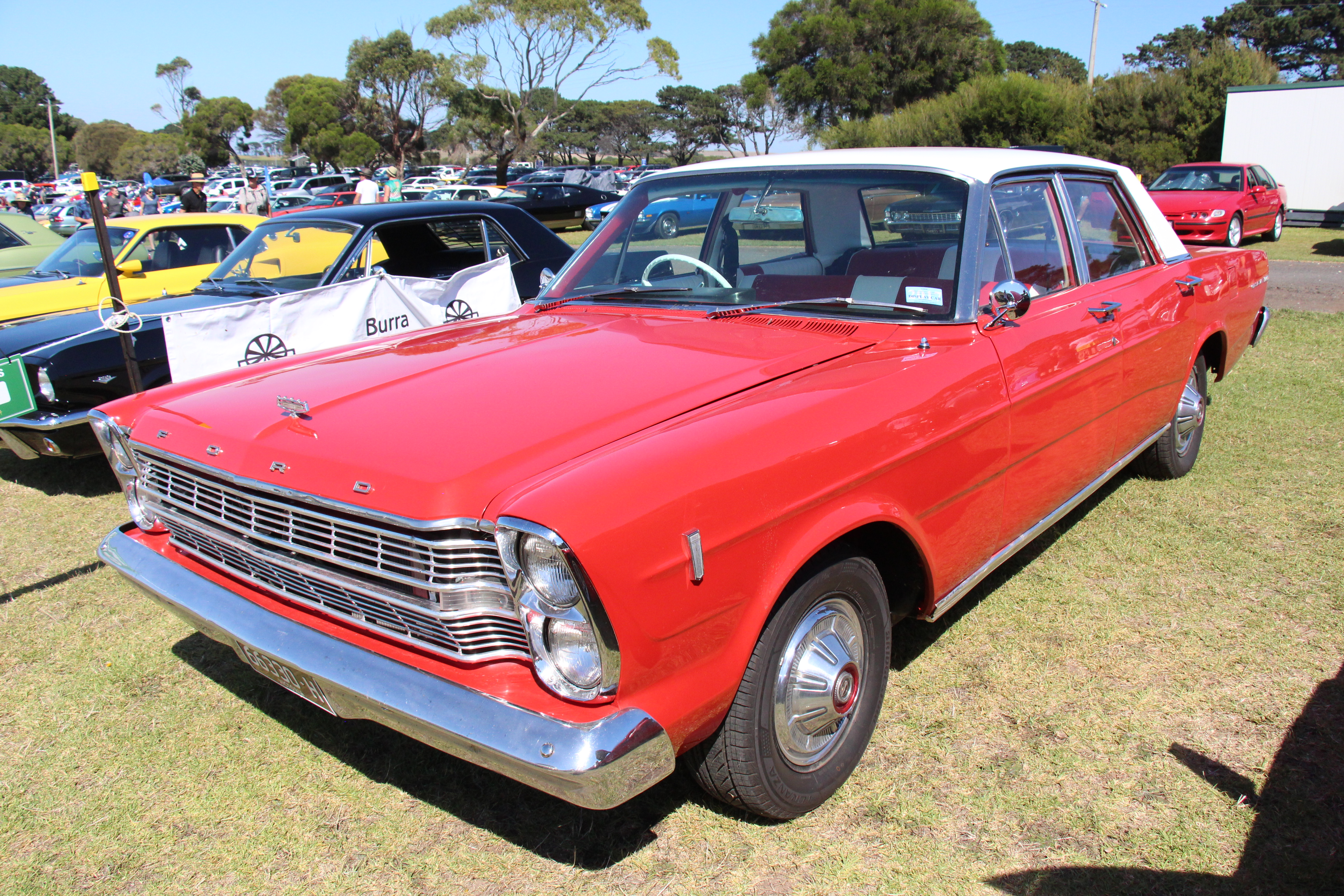
1966 Ford Custom 4-door Sedan

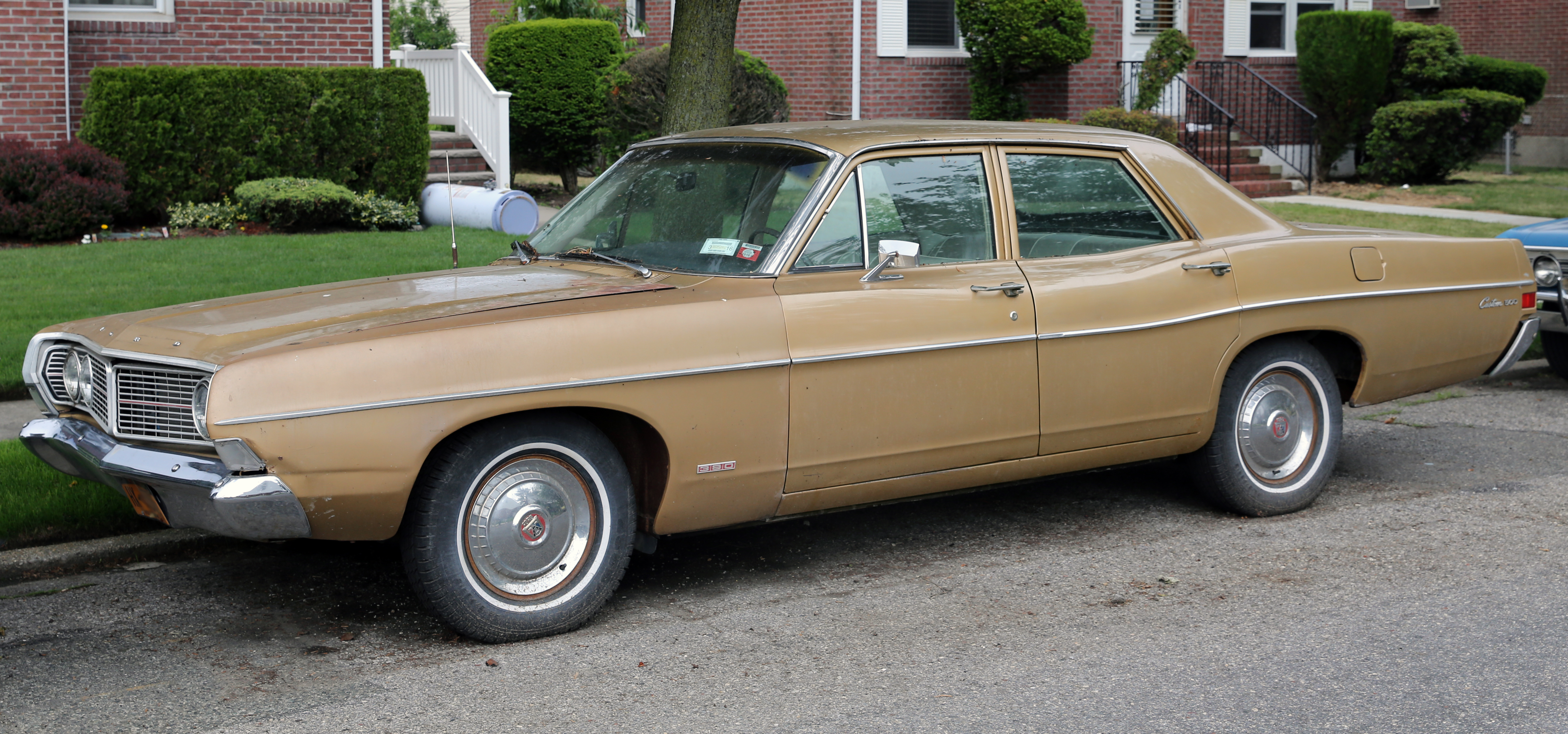
1968 Custom 500 4-Door Sedan

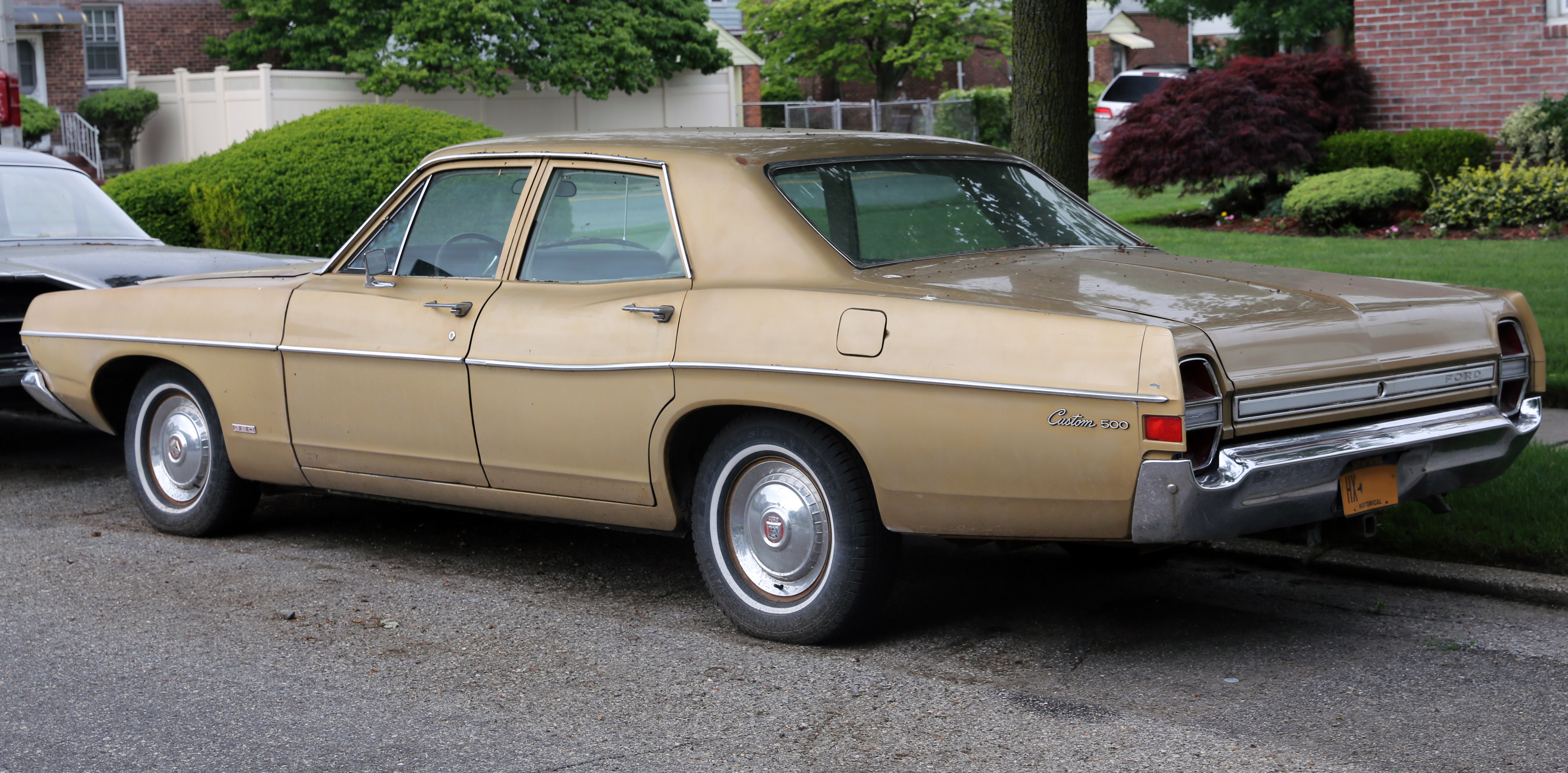
1968 Custom 500 4-Door Sedan

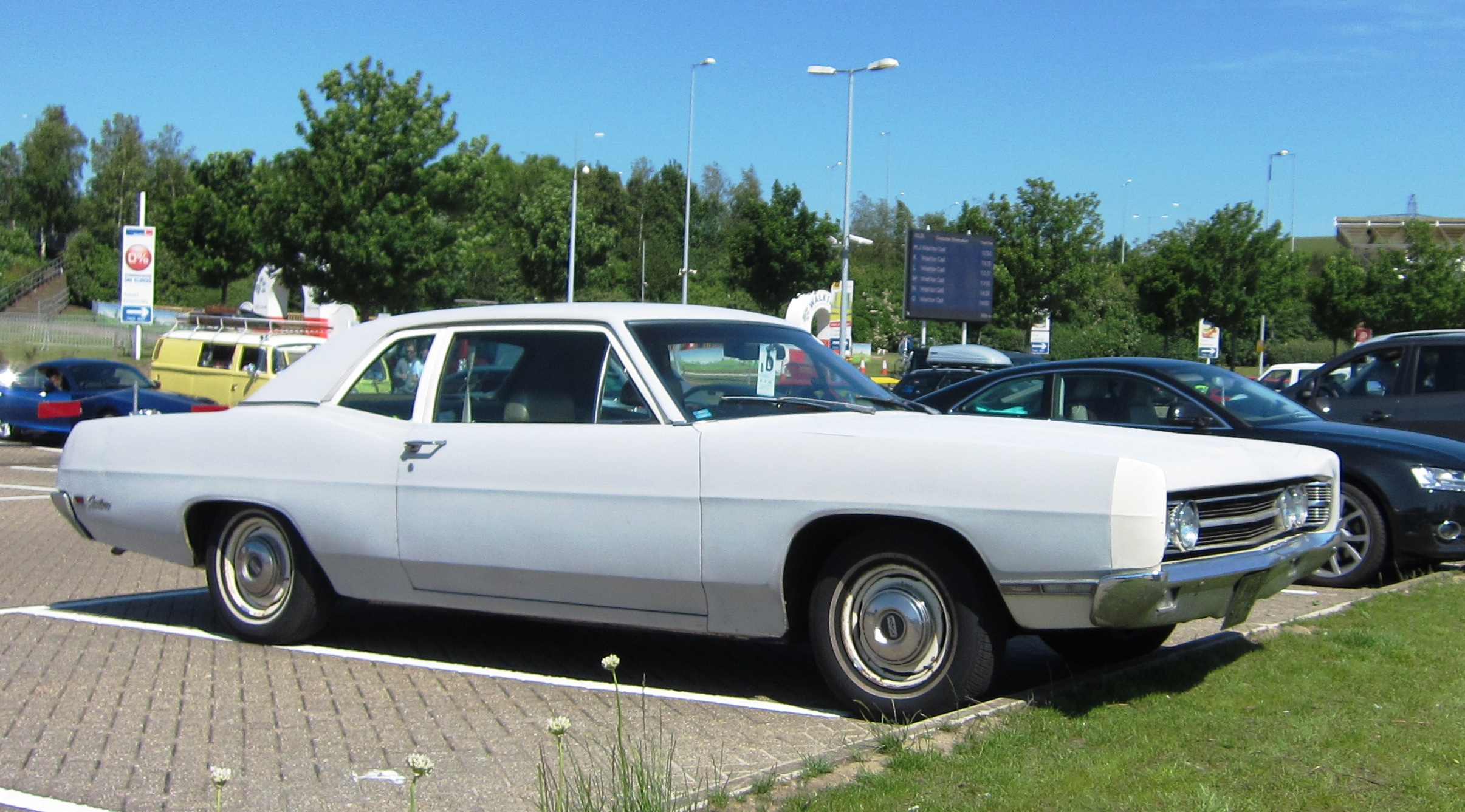
1969 Ford Custom 2-Door Sedan

=== 1979–1981 (Canada only) ===
The 1979 Custom 500 for the Canadian market was completely redesigned with the advent of the Panther platform, and had the base-model 1979 Ford LTD front end (with single rectangular headlights and inboard parking lights on a grille distinct from the upper-trimmed LTD Landau/Crown Victoria). The standard powertrain in 1979 was a 302 cu in (5 L) V8 with SelectShift transmission, while a 351 cu in (5.8 L) Windsor V8 was optional. For 1980, to meet EPA CAFE standards, a 255 cu in (4.2 L) V8 was made standard, with the 302 and 351 V8 engines optional.

=== Production ===
Approximately 7,850,000 full-size Fords and Mercurys were sold over 1969-78. This makes it the tenth best selling automobile platform in history.

== Australian production ==
The Ford Custom Fordor was produced in Australia from September 1949, and Australian content on the locally produced Custom had reached 80% by 1950. A coupe utility variant was also offered by Ford Australia, initially as the Ford Coupe Utility, and later as the Ford De Luxe Coupe Utility.

The 1959 model North American Custom 300 was also produced by Ford Australia from September 1959. Offered only as a four-door sedan and only with a 332 cu in (5.4 L) V8 engine, it was given a mild makeover in late 1960 which included the grille design from the 1959 Canadian Meteor. The facelifted model continued in production through to 1962.
