= Ford Ranch Wagon =

Station wagon produced by Ford (1952-1974)

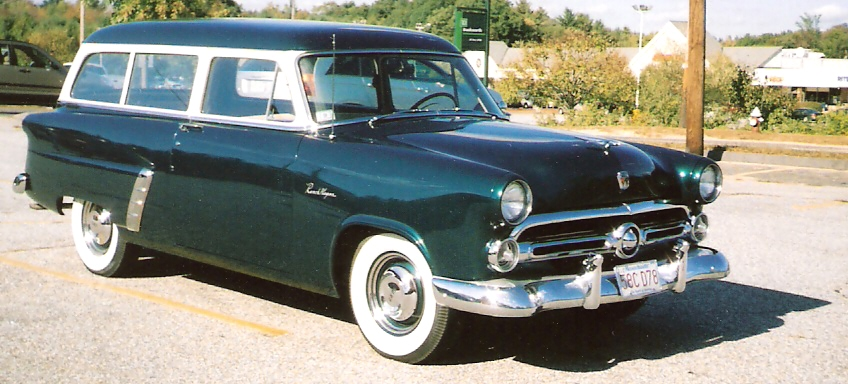
- 1952 Ford Mainline Ranch Wagon

Overview
- Manufacturer: Ford
- Production: 1952–1974
- Assembly: United States: Main plant; Dearborn, MI; Branch Assembly; Twin Cities, MN; Somerville, MA; Richmond, CA; Norfolk, VA; Memphis, TN; Louisville, KY; Long Beach, CA; Kansas City, MO; Edgewater, NJ; Dallas, TX; Chicago, IL; Chester, PA; Buffalo, NY; Atlanta, GA; Broadmeadows, Australia

Body and chassis
- Layout: FR layout

The Ford Ranch Wagon is a station wagon which was built by Ford in the United States from 1952 to 1974. The Ranch Wagon was a full-size model, except in 1963 and 1964, when it was part of the intermediate-size Fairlane series, and represented the lowest-priced selection in its respective line.

== 1952–1962 ==
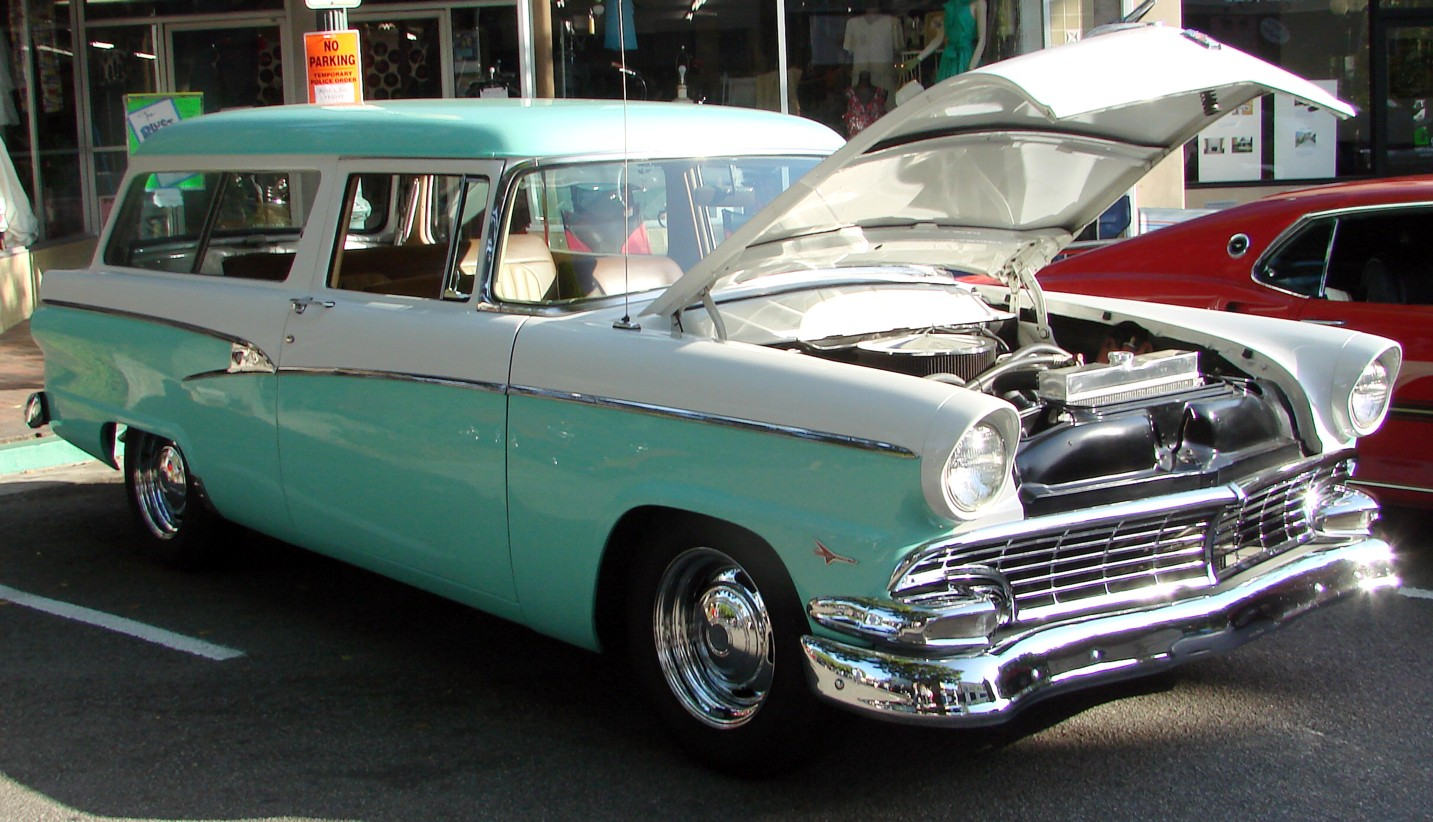
1956 Ford Custom Ranch Wagon

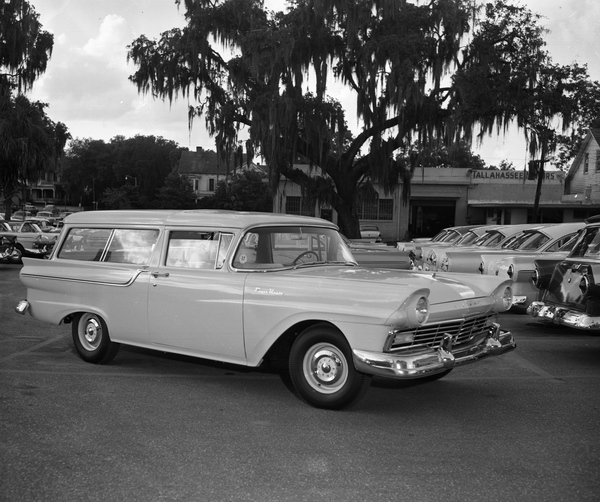
1957 Ford Ranch Wagon

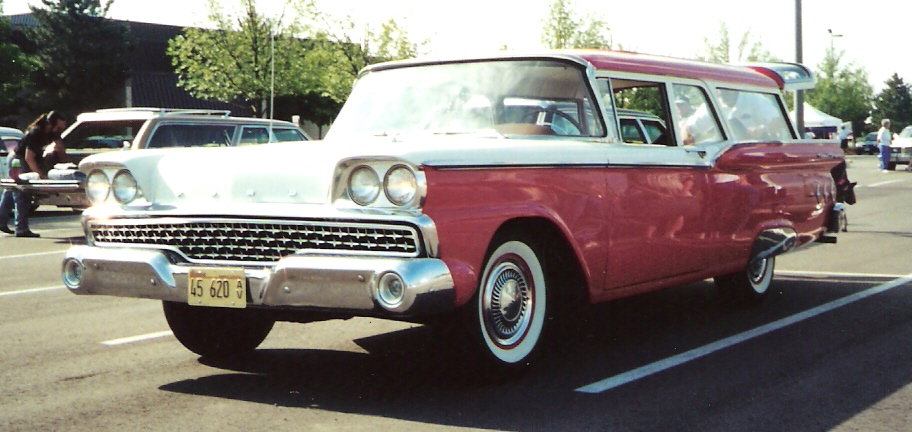
1959 Ford 2-door Ranch Wagon

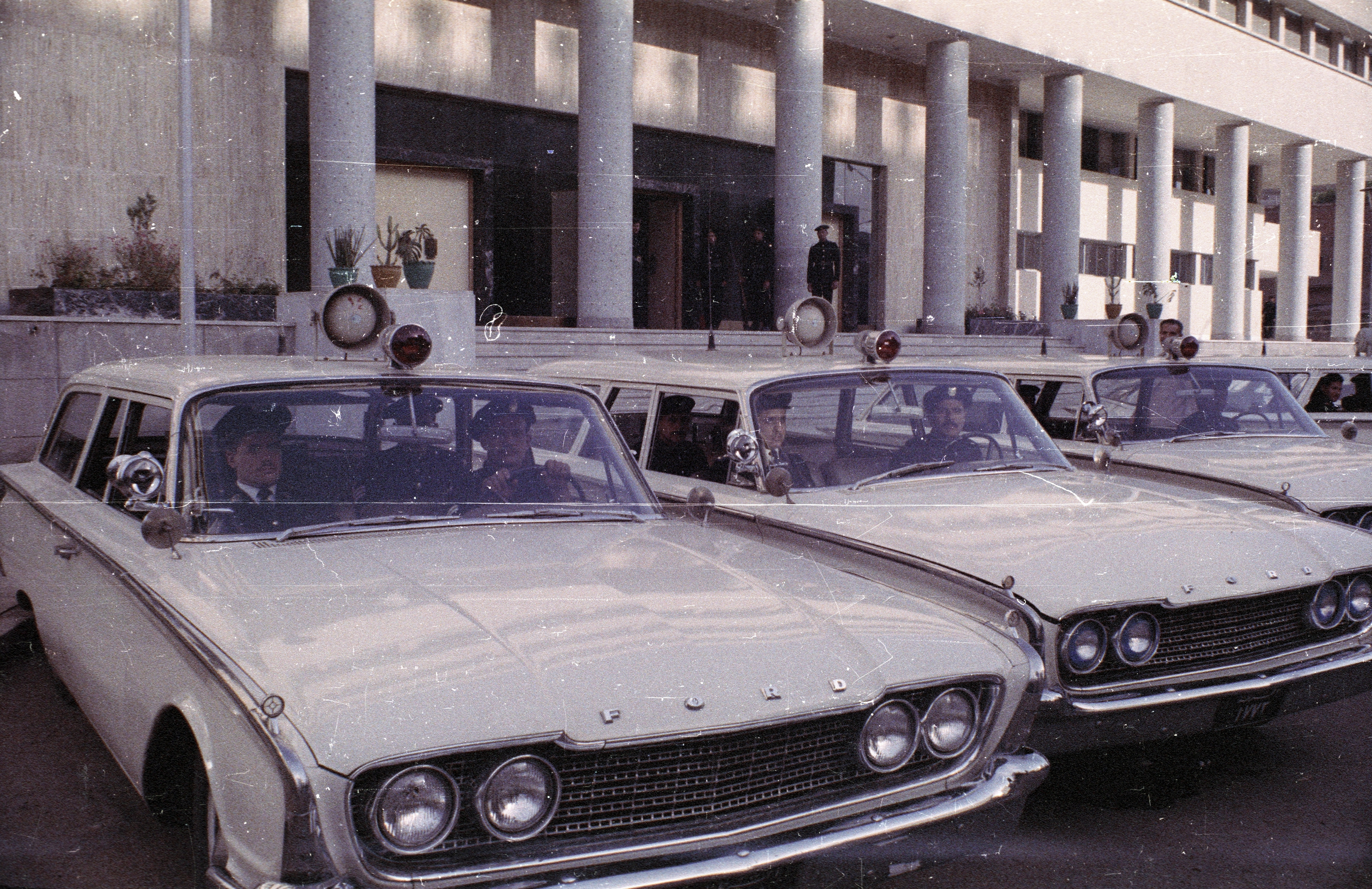
1960 Ford 2 Door Ranch Wagons

In the early 1950s, the wood-bodied station wagon was becoming upscale and expensive. When Ford introduced a redesigned line of cars for the 1952 model year, its Country Squire continued to cater to buyers who still wanted a station wagon with the look of wood (attained by applying simulated exterior wood decals, which were framed in genuine wood through 1953).

For other wagon buyers, Ford also gave them two new choices that year, the first all-steel wagons in the firm's history. These were the Country Sedan, a four-door model in the mid-range Customline series and the Ranch Wagon, which was a two-door model in the economy Mainline series, inspired by the European-term shooting-brake. The Ranch Wagon had either the standard "Mileage Maker" six-cylinder engine or the long-familiar flathead V8, which was optional.

After receiving mostly cosmetic changes for 1953, a second Ranch Wagon model, a slightly fancier version in the Customline series, was added for 1954, the year Ford's new Y-block V8 replaced the flathead unit. The two models were renamed Ranch Wagon and Custom Ranch Wagon for 1955, when the entire Ford station wagon set became a series of its own. For 1957, the Del Rio Ranch Wagon was introduced (replacing both the Custom Ranch Wagon and the Parklane), sporting special ranch-pattern upholstery. That same model was the basis for the new 1957 Ranchero, and a Mercury version called the Mercury Commuter which was a hardtop inspired wagon without a "B" pillar.

There were three Ranch Wagons the following year, as the first four-door Ranch Wagon was added to the model range. The Del Rio was dropped for 1959, replaced by a one-year-only two-door Country Sedan. By this time, full-size two-door station wagons were fading in popularity, and the 1961 two-door Ranch Wagon was the last full-size two-door wagon ever built (along with the two-door Plymouth Deluxe Suburban of that same year), leaving the four-door as the sole Ranch Wagon model for 1962.

=== Sales ===
Fourth-generation Ranch Wagon production (2-door and 4-door numbers combined)
| Year | Sales |
|---|---|
| 1957 | 60,486 |
| 1958 | 62,432 |
| 1959 | 112,927 |

== 1963–1964 ==
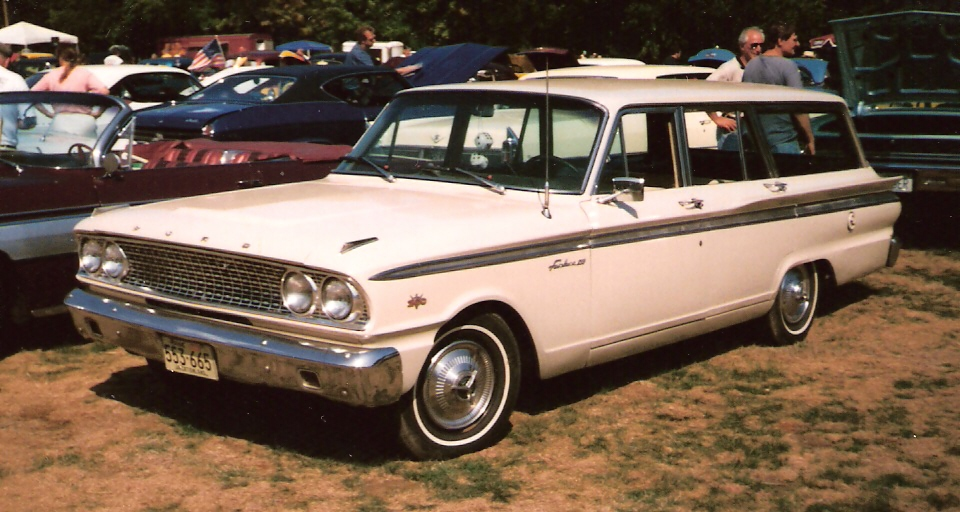
1963 Ford Fairlane 500 Custom Ranch Wagon

In 1963 and 1964, no Ranch Wagon was included in Ford's full-size station wagon series, but the name was used for some station wagons in the intermediate-size Fairlane series. It was offered in the base and 500 trim levels, with the 500 also marketed as the "Custom Ranch Wagon". The 1963 models ran with a 200-cid six-cylinder or any of three optional V8 engines—221, 260- or 289-cid. The 221 was dropped for 1964.

== 1965–1974 ==
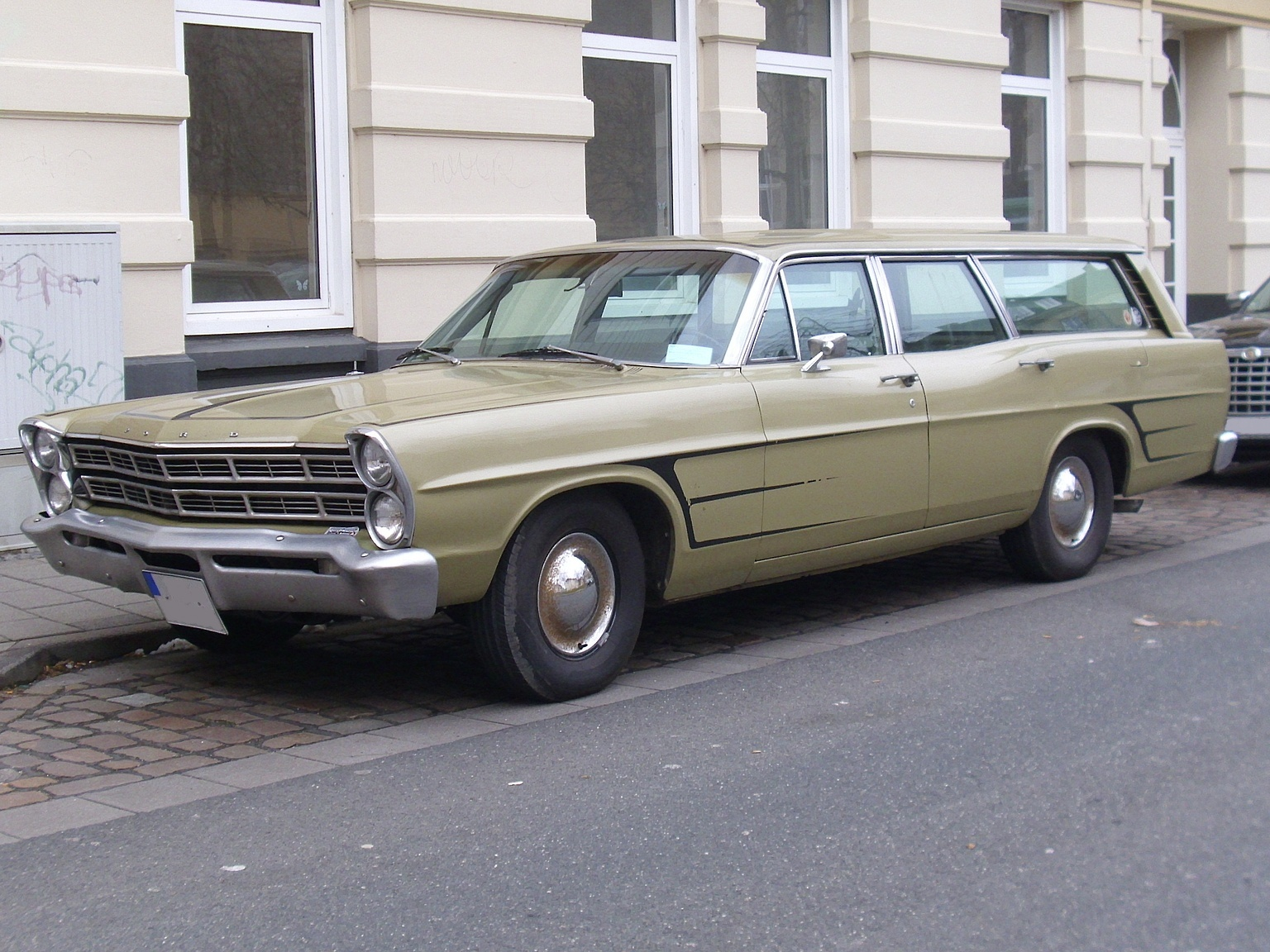
1967 Ford Ranch Wagon

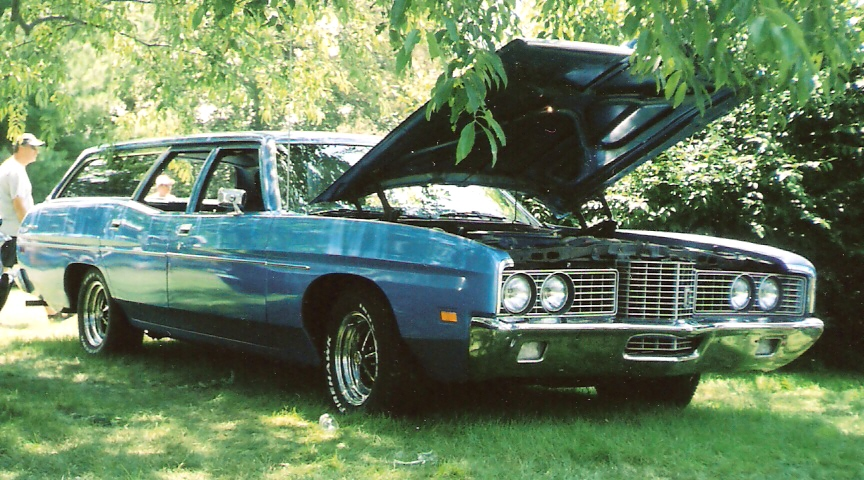
1972 Ford Ranch Wagon

The Ranch Wagon returned to the full-size line for 1965. In 1966, it was the beneficiary of Ford's innovative new dual-action Magic Doorgate, which could be opened either down or sideways. In 1968, two new Ranch Wagon models, called the Custom 500 Ranch Wagons, were introduced; one a six-passenger model, the other the first Ranch Wagon furnished with third row seating, Ford's familiar side-mounted dual-facing rear seats.

Ford wagons ceased to be a separate series when they were redesigned for 1969, officially becoming part of the respective series on which they were based; thus that year's base Ranch Wagon was now a member of the low-end Custom series. In 1970, for the first time, all Ranch Wagons were powered by a V8. A three-speed manual transmission continued as standard through the 1971 model year, with all cars fitted with a SelectShift automatic transmission starting with the 1972 models.

The Custom series was dropped when Ford issued the next generation of full-size cars for 1973, meaning all Ranch Wagons were Custom 500s. The 1974 Ranch Wagon was the last available for sale to the general public. From 1975 to 1977, small quantities of Custom 500 station wagons (no longer called Ranch Wagon) were produced strictly for fleet buyers.
