= Ford Parklane =

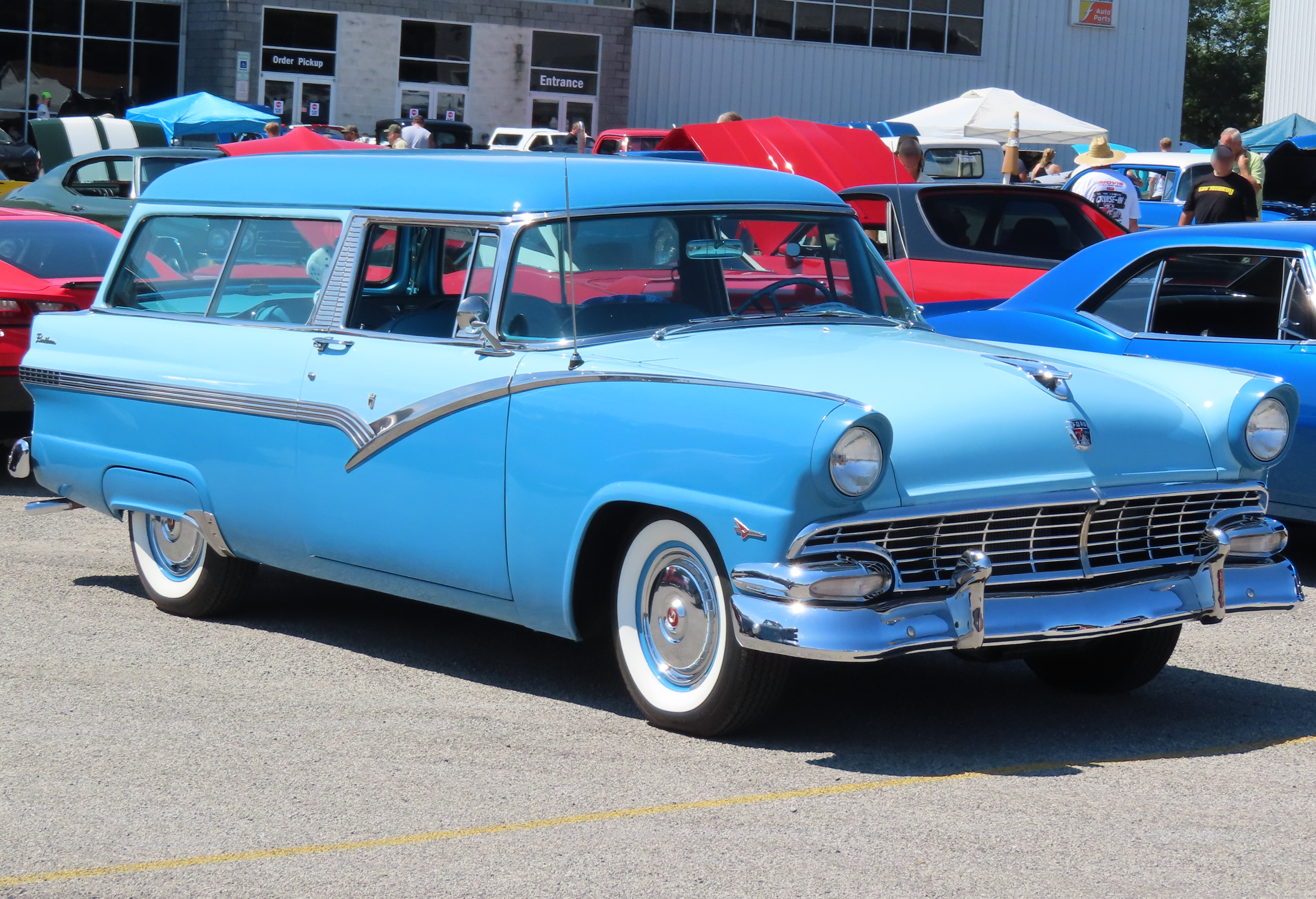
- 1956 Ford Parklane

Overview
- Manufacturer: Ford Motor Company
- Model years: 1956

Body and chassis
- Class: Full-size car
- Body style: 2-door station wagon
- Platform: 1955 Ford
- Related: Ford Ranch Wagon; Ford Fairlane

Powertrain
- Engine: 223 CID "Mileage Maker" 1bbl. 137 hp (102 kW) I6; 292 CID "Thunderbird" 4bbl. 200-202hp V8
- Transmission: 3-speed manual Ford-O-Matic automatic

Dimensions
- Wheelbase: 115.5 in (2,934 mm)
- Length: 197.6 in (5,019 mm)
- Width: 75.9 in (1,928 mm)

Chronology
- Successor: Ford Del Rio

The Ford Parklane is a station wagon that was produced by Ford for the 1956 model year. In line with the Chevrolet Nomad, the Parklane was a premium two-door station wagon, combining the body of the two-door Ford Ranch Wagon with trim elements of the Ford Fairlane sedan.

For the 1957 model year, the Parklane was succeeded by the Ford Del Rio; similar in concept to the Parklane, the Del Rio was added to the Ranch Wagon model line. The nameplate returned (as two words) for 1958 in the Mercury division, denoting its premium sedan line; the Mercury Park Lane was produced through the end of the 1960s.

== Model overview ==
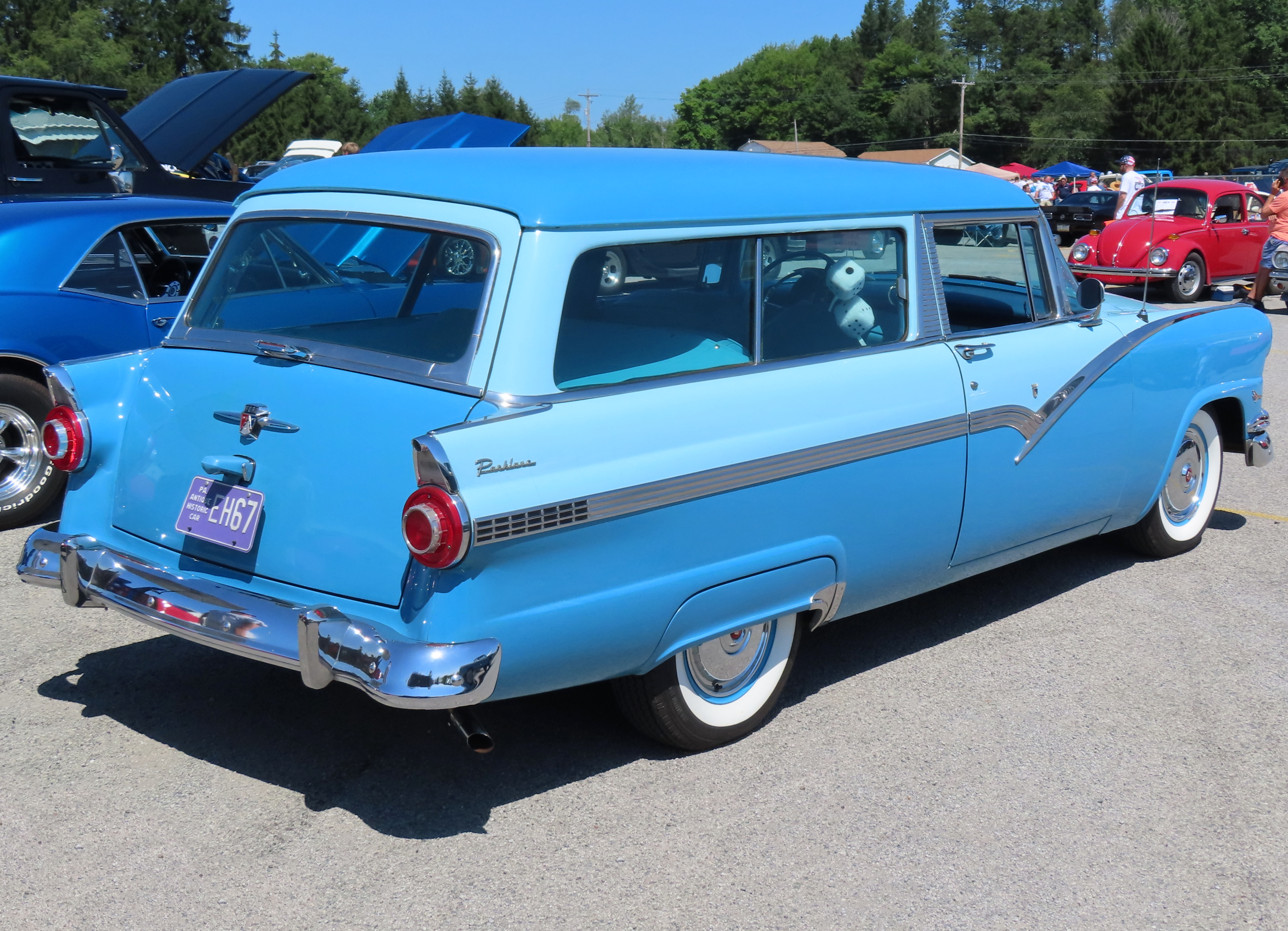
1956 Ford Parklane, rear view

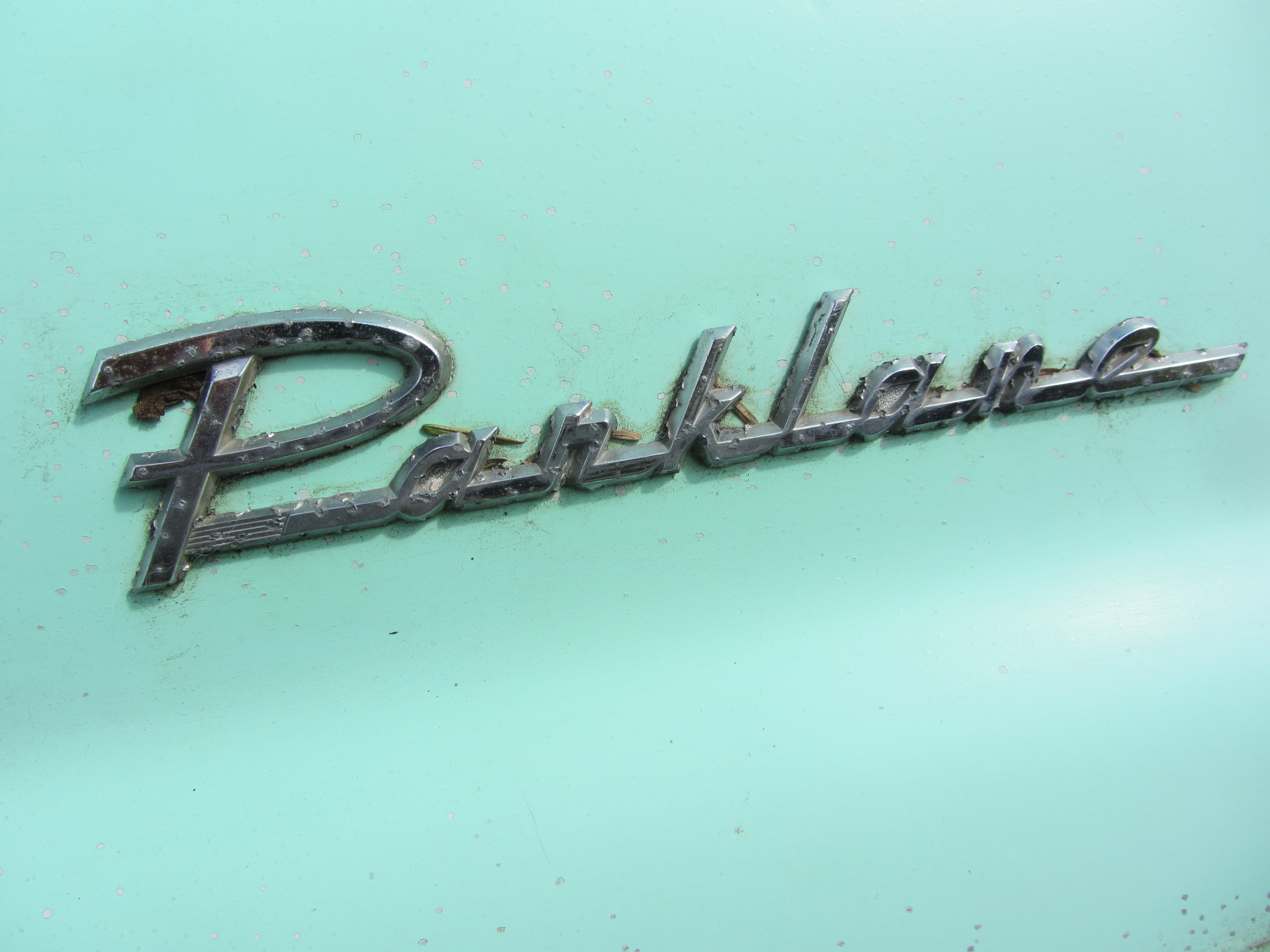
Ford Parklane rear fender badging

The Parklane is a two-door station wagon, sharing its bodyshell with the Ford Ranch Wagon. (By contrast, the rival Nomad shared very little with other Chevrolet wagons from the cowl back.) To distinguish the model line, the Parklane received the stainless-steel bodyside stripe of the Fairlane (otherwise reserved for three-row Country Sedans). While the roofline was shared directly with the Ranch Wagon, the B-pillar was trimmed in stainless steel (a design element loosely adapted from the Fairlane Crown Victoria).

The model line introduced several advanced features for the time, including a fully-carpeted interior (including the cargo area) and a privacy cover for the cargo area. As a $60 option, the Park Lane was offered with 4-way front power seats. In line with other Ford station wagons, the rear seat of the Park Lane folded completely flat, forming a single flat load surface.

The Parklane shared its powertrain offerings with other Ford station wagons. A 223 cubic-inch inline-6 was the standard engine, with a 292 cubic-inch V8 (shared with the Thunderbird) was offered as an option. The 11-inch drum brakes introduced for 1955 were fitted to the model line.

== Epilogue ==
Although a 1957 Parklane prototype was assembled, Ford withdrew the model line after a single model year. Coinciding with the release of the 1957 Ford model family, Ford repackaged the Parklane as the Ford Del Rio. While similar in concept, the Del Rio was more closely integrated within the Ranch Wagon model range.

As the 1950s progressed, two-door station wagons began to fall out of favor; though offering the same passenger capacity as a four-door wagon, two-door station wagons restricted rear-seat passenger access. Purchased primarily for utilitarian use, the market segment of two-door station wagons saw little demand for high-feature vehicles (which appealed to families).

While more widely recognized than the Parklane (in part from its concept-car derived design), the Chevrolet Nomad was outsold by the Parklane by nearly two-to-one: 15,186 Parklanes were produced in comparison to 7,886 1956 Nomads.
