= Ford Del Rio =

Ford Custom 300 Del Rio
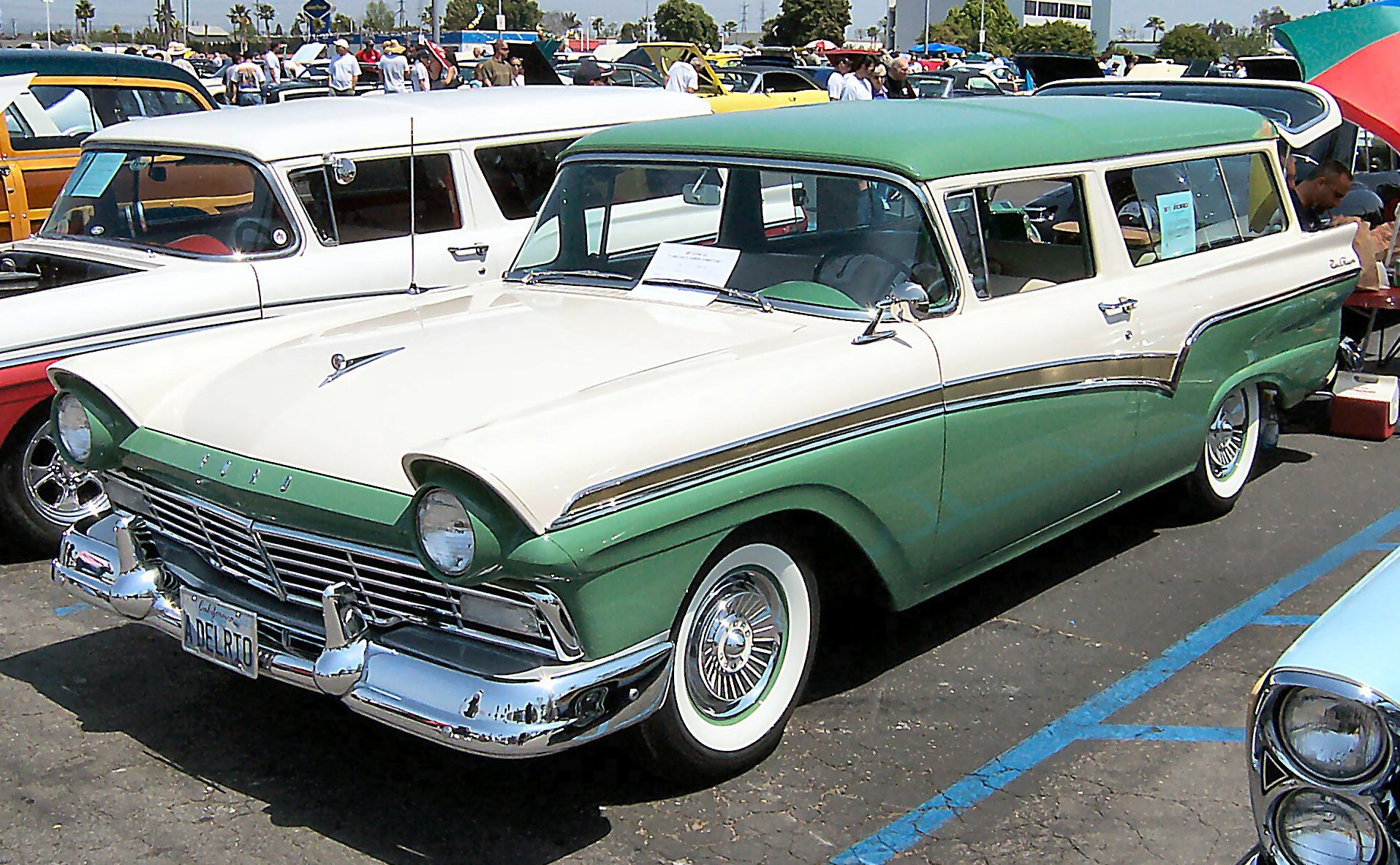
- 1957 Ford Del Rio Ranch Wagon

Overview
- Manufacturer: Ford
- Model years: 1957–1958
- Assembly: United States: Main plant; Dearborn, MI; Branch Assembly; Twin Cities, MN; Somerville, MA; Richmond, CA; Norfolk, VA; Memphis, TN; Louisville, KY; Long Beach, CA; Kansas City, MO; Edgewater, NJ; Dallas, TX; Chicago, IL; Chester, PA; Buffalo, NY; Atlanta, GA

Body and chassis
- Class: Full-size Ford
- Body style: 2-door station wagon
- Layout: FR layout
- Platform: 1957 Ford
- Related: Ford Fairlane; Ford Ranchero; Mercury Commuter

Powertrain
- Engine: 3.7 L (223 cu in) "Mileage Maker" I6 145hp 5.4 L (332 cu in) FE V8 240-265hp 5.8 L (352 cu in) FE/Thunderbird V8 300hp
- Transmission: 3-speed Cruise-O-Matic automatic

Dimensions
- Wheelbase: 116 in (2,946.4 mm)
- Length: 202.7 in (5,148.6 mm)

Chronology
- Predecessor: Ford Parklane

The Ford Del Rio is a full-size, six-passenger station wagon that was produced by Ford in the United States for model years 1957 and 1958. The model was also marketed under the name Del Rio Ranch Wagon.

== Description ==
The impetus for the creation of the Del Rio was Ford's desire to remain in the two-door sport wagon market started by the Chevrolet Nomad and Pontiac Safari and the decision to discontinue the company's original attempt at a sport wagon, the premium Parklane, which failed to entice buyers during 1956, its only year in production. Four-way power seats were available.

While the Nomad was Chevrolet's most expensive model, offering a premium vehicle with a show car-inspired body style, the Del Rio was strictly based on an existing product, the utilitarian two-door Ranch Wagon, Ford's least expensive station wagon, as part of the Custom 300 series.

Beginning with the basic body, buyers of the Del Rio were offered a unique two-tone paint scheme (optional), better quality interior and exterior brightwork (including gold anodized aluminum accents) and a higher grade vinyl upholstery. Del Rio buyers also had their choice of either Ford's “Mileage Maker” 144 hp six or its “Thunderbird” 215 hp, 312 cubic inch (5.1 litre) displacement Y-Block V-8. The Del Rio was equipped with 11-inch front drum brakes.

Like all other Ford station wagons at that time, the Del Rio used a two-piece tailgate – a feature that dealers emphasized was an advantage over GM's steeply raked rear gate and self-storing window, which were known for water leaks in heavy rains.

While Ford sold more Del Rios in 1957 (46,105) than Chevrolet did with its Nomad in its three years of production, Ford terminated the Del Rio program at the end of the 1958 model year after selling only 12,687 of its "sport wagons".

Ford didn't entirely abandon the concept of a two-door station wagon, and used a smaller version with the all-new Ford Falcon in 1960, offered in multiple bodystyles, including a two-door station wagon.

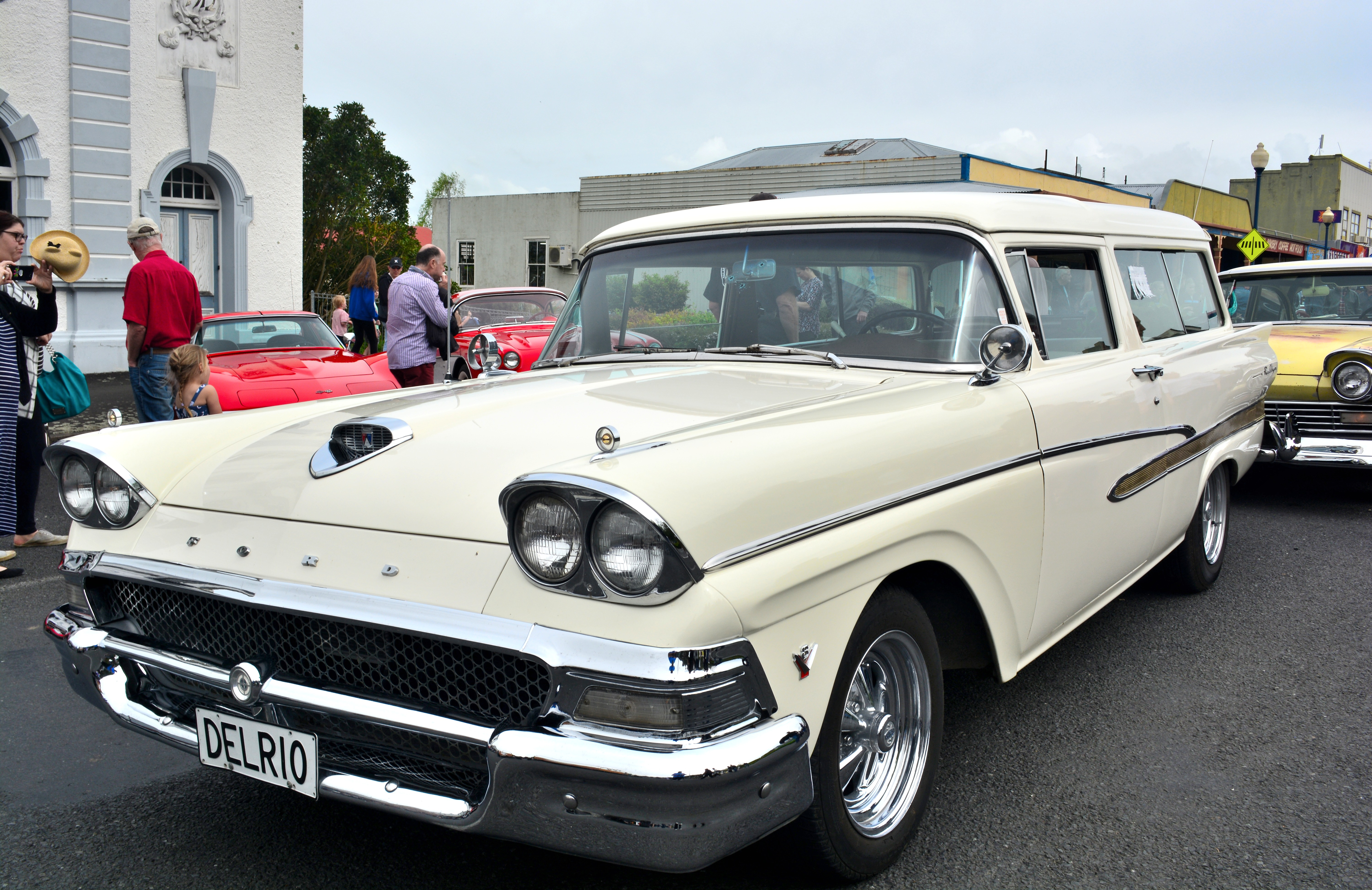
1958 Ford Del Rio Ranch Wagon (with after-market wheels)
