= 1957 Ford =

1957 – 1959 Ford
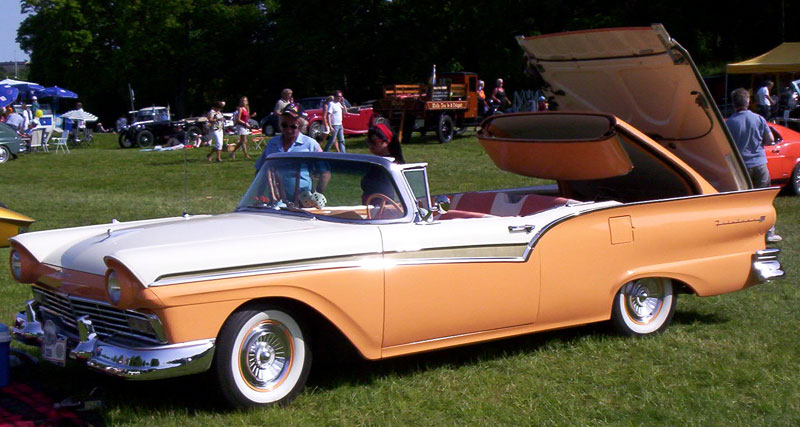
- 1957 Ford Fairlane 500 Skyliner

Overview
- Manufacturer: Ford
- Production: 1957–1959
- Assembly: Main plant; Dearborn, MI (⇗); Branch Assembly; Twin Cities, MN (⇗); Somerville, MA (⇗); Richmond, CA (⇗); Norfolk, VA (⇗); Memphis, TN (⇗); Louisville, KY (⇗); Long Beach, CA (⇗); Kansas City, MO (⇗); Mahwah, NJ (⇗); Dallas, TX (⇗); Chicago, IL (⇗); Chester, PA (⇗); Buffalo, NY (⇗); Atlanta, GA (⇗); Worldwide; Broadmeadows, Australia (1959 model) (⇗)

Body and chassis
- Class: Full-size Ford
- Body style: 2-door sedan (Tudor, Club Sedan); 2-door business sedan (Tudor); 4-door sedan (Fordor, Town Sedan); 2-door hardtop (Club Victoria); 4-door hardtop (Town Victoria); 2-door convertible (Sunliner); 2-door retractable hardtop (Skyliner); 2-door station wagon 4-door station wagon 2-door coupe utility (Ranchero); 2-door sedan delivery (Courier)
- Layout: FR layout
- Related: Meteor (Canada); Edsel Ranger; Edsel Pacer; Edsel Roundup; Edsel Villager; Edsel Bermuda

Powertrain
- Engine: 223 CID (3.7 L) OHV I6; 272 CID (4.5 L) Y-block V8; 292 CID (4.8 L) T-bird V8; 312 CID (5.1 L) T-bird V8 (1957); 332 CID (5.4 L) FE V8 (1958–59); 352 CID (5.8 L) FE V8 (1958–59)
- Transmission: 3-speed manual 3-speed Cruise-O-Matic automatic 2-speed Ford-O-Matic automatic

Dimensions
- Wheelbase: 116 in (2,946 mm); 118 in (2,997 mm)
- Length: 203.5 in (5,169 mm)

Chronology
- Predecessor: 1955 Ford
- Successor: 1960 Ford

The mainstream Ford line of cars grew substantially larger for 1957, a model which lasted through 1959. The Crown Victoria with its flashy chrome "basket handle" was no more, and the acrylic glass-roofed Crown Victoria Skyliner was replaced by a new model, the retracting-roof hardtop Skyliner.

The new chassis allowed the floor to be placed much lower, which in turn led to a lower and longer look overall. Wheels were now 14 inches in diameter rather the previous 15 inches, this also helped to give a lower profile. The major component of this chassis was a differential whose pinion gear was exceptionally low relative to the axleshafts, lower than in conventional hypoid differentials.

== 1957 ==
The 1957 models retained a single-headlight front end like their predecessors, but were unmistakable with their long flanks and tailfins. A plethora of trim lines was introduced, starting with the base "Custom", "Custom 300", "Fairlane", and top-line "Fairlane 500". The two Custom lines used a 116 in (2946 mm) wheelbase, while the Fairlanes had 118 in (2997 mm) between the wheels. A new car/pickup truck hybrid based on the short-wheelbase chassis was also introduced, the Ranchero.

The 223 CID (3.7 L) OHV straight-six continued, now with 144 hp (107 kW). The V8 lineup included a 272 CID (4.5 L) Y-block making 190 hp (142 kW), a 292 CID (4.8 L) Thunderbird version making 212 hp (158 kW), a 312 cubic inch V8 making 245 HP and a supercharged 312 CID (5.1 L) Thunderbird Special making 300 hp (224 kW), and designated "Police Interceptor" on the glove box. Two dual 4-barrel versions of the naturally aspirated (non-supercharged) 312 cubic inch V8 rated at 270 and 285 HP were available. The 270 HP version had the same cam as all the other V-8s but had vibration dampers on the valve springs. The 285 HP engine had a racing cam and was only available to NASCAR and possibly other racers. This option was dubbed "E code" and was available in all body types. It came standard with the deep-dish steering wheel. The radio had a transistorized audio output stage for the first time. There were lights for the generator and oil instead of gauges. The controls became recessed for more safety (the Lifeguard safety package was still available). Safety did not yet sell, however: In a survey of 1957 Ford owners in the March, 1957 issue of Popular Mechanics, only 6.2% of owners ordered seat belts.

A new frame was used for the 1957 Fords. It moved to perimeter rails out, so that they would fully envelope the passengers.

This model was very successful, being the best selling car in America, overtaking arch rival Chevrolet for the first time since 1935.

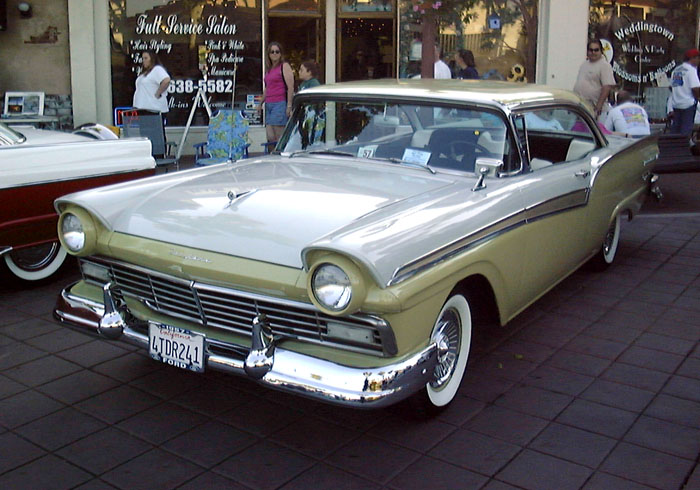
1957 Ford Fairlane 500 Club Victoria

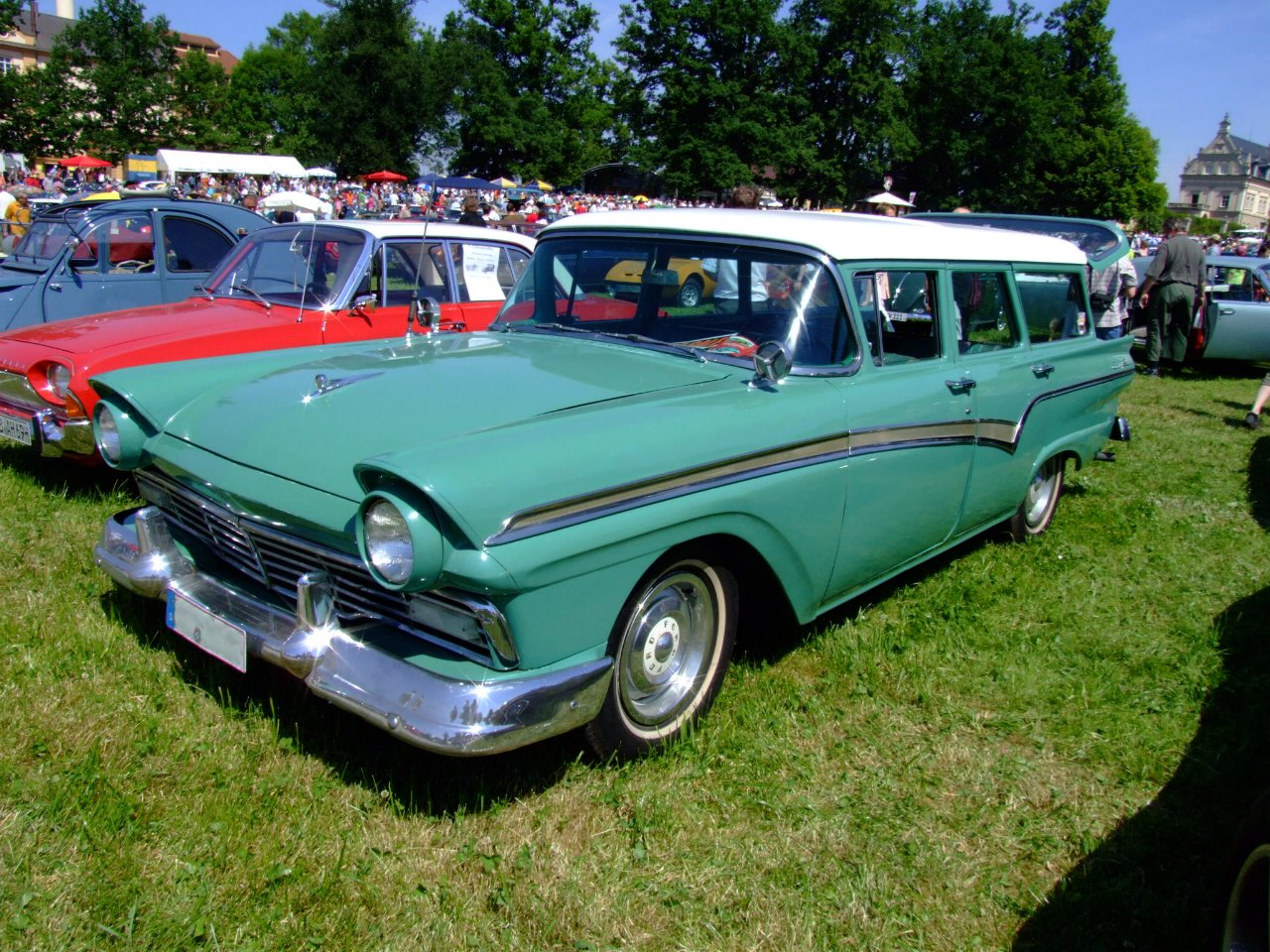
1957 Ford Country Sedan

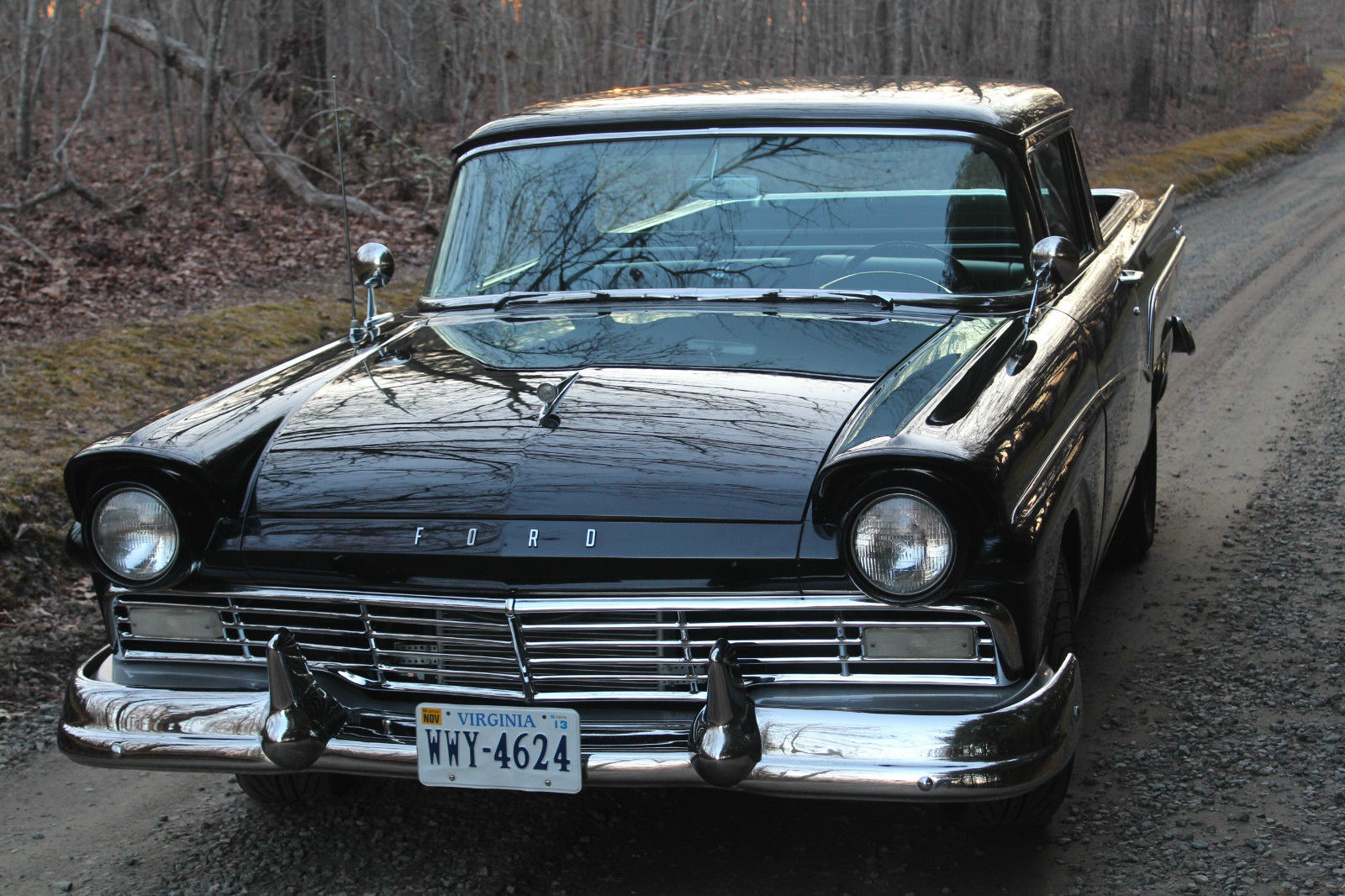
1957 Ford Custom Ranchero

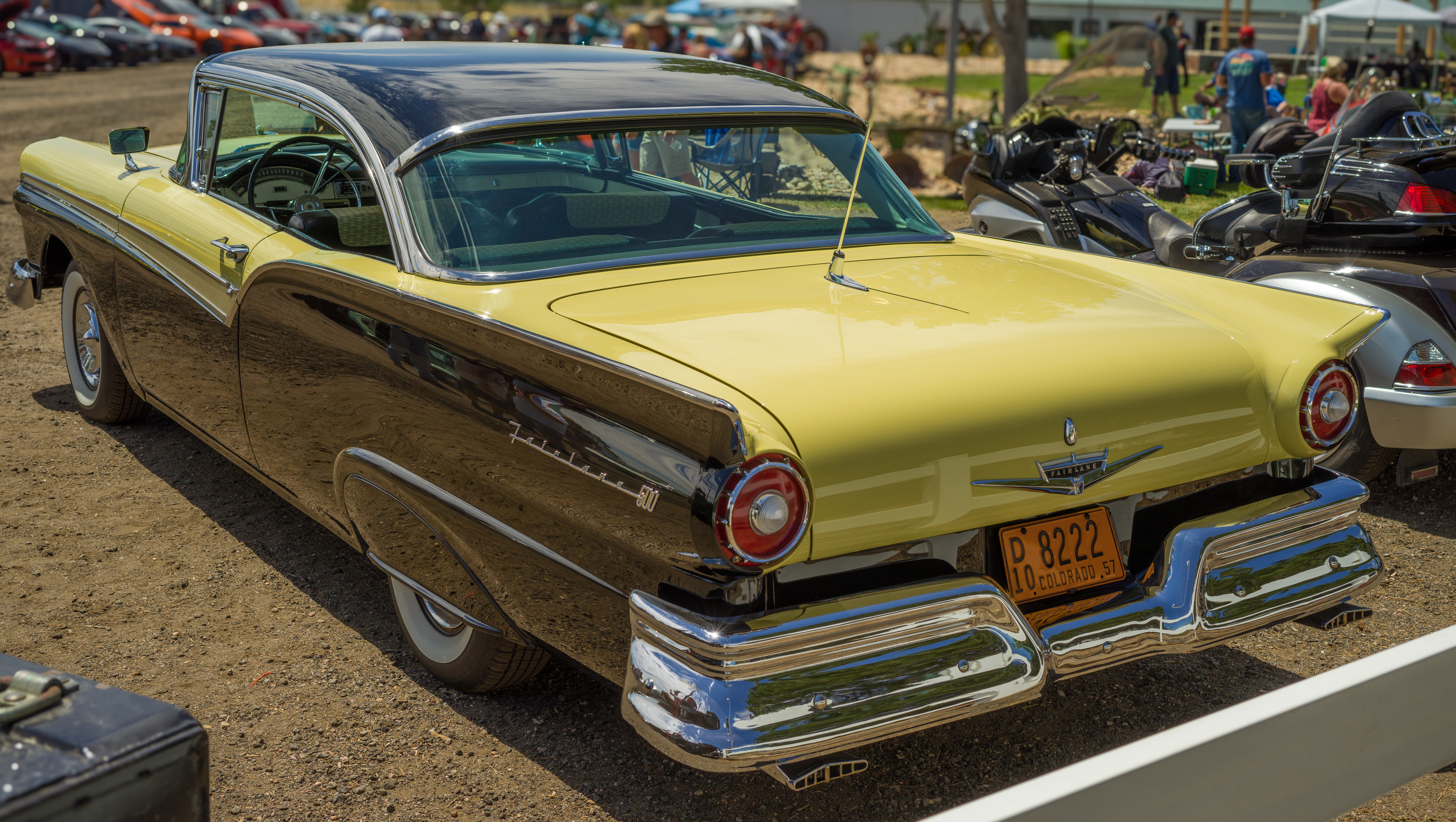
1957 Ford Fairlane 500

== 1958 ==
The line was freshened with a simulated hood scoop and dual-headlight front clip for 1958. The rectangular grille openings gave way to circles and grille was set in the bumper. A new 3-speed Cruise-O-Matic automatic was optional along with the 2-speed Ford-O-Matic and manual transmission. Engines were also updated, with the 272 CID dropped, the 292 CID making 205 hp (153 kW), and a new-generation 332 CID (5.4 L) FE V8 rated at 240 HP in 2 barrel form and 265 HP in 4 barrel "Interceptor" form. The new 352 cubic inch V8, also dubbed "Interceptor" and rated at 300 hp (224 kW) made its debut. A full-flow oil filter became standard across the range. Galaxie production was started in Lorain, Ohio at Ford's Lorain Assembly plant for 1958 and continued through 1959 with 102,869 Galaxies produced there. Air suspension, called "Ford-Aire" became optional on all vehicles except the entry-level Custom 300 for $156 ($1,741 in 2025 dollars) but was cancelled in 1959. Vehicles equipped with the feature had a badge attached to the rear of the vehicle.

The convertible version of Ford Fairlane 500, Ford Fairlane 500 Skyliner (also called Skyliner Retractable Convertible), had been sold for three years – 1957, 1958, and 1959. It was the most expensive vehicle offered by Ford. The 1958 Skyliner sold for $3,163 ($35,296 in 2025 dollars) while the standard convertible sold for $2,650 ($29,572 in 2025 dollars) and the sedan went for $2,055 ($22,932 in 2025 dollars). A total of 14,713 units were produced in 1958. Ford Fairlane 500 Skyliner weighed 4,609-pounds.

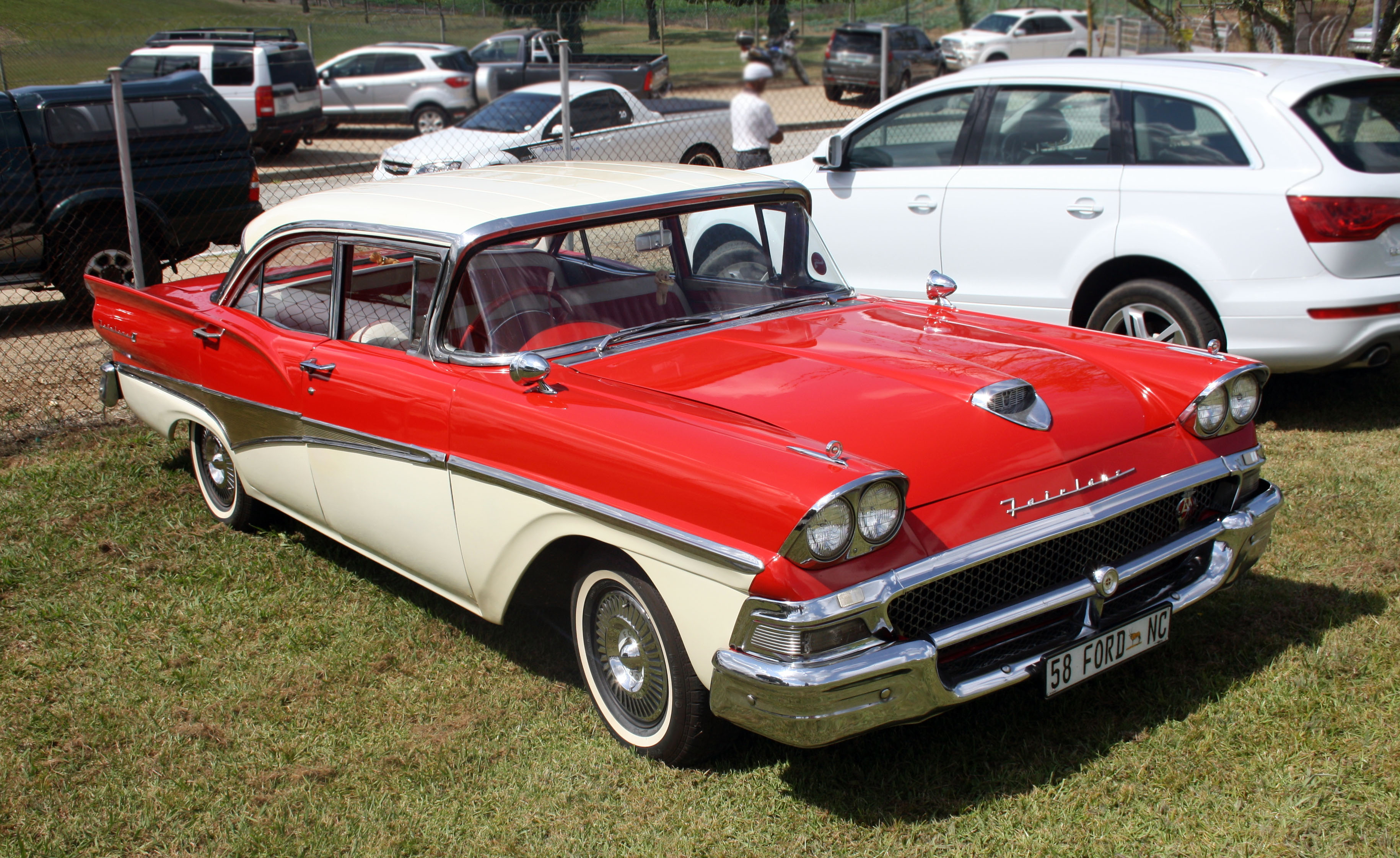
1958 Ford Fairlane 500 Sedan

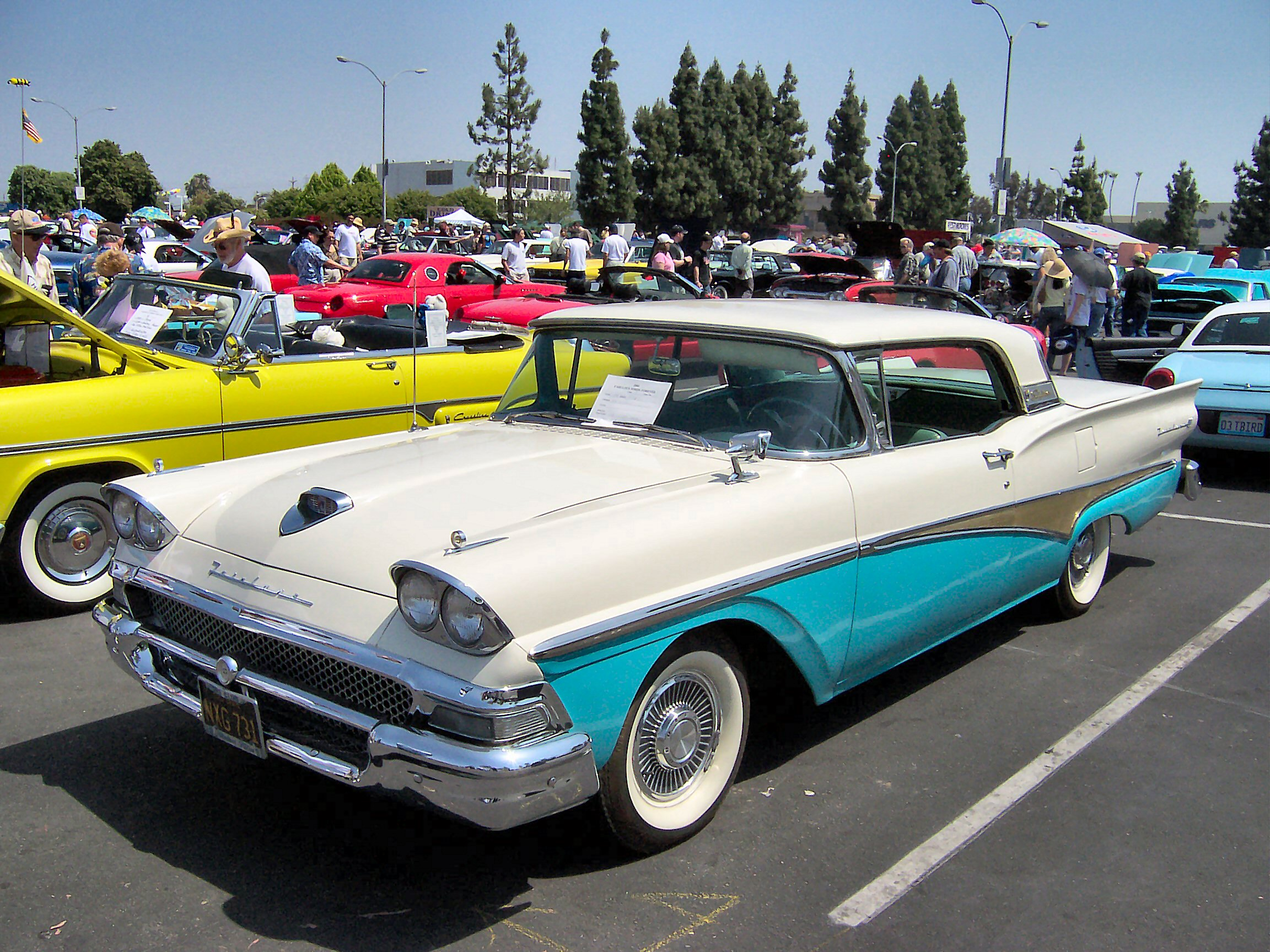
1958 Ford Fairlane 500 Skyliner

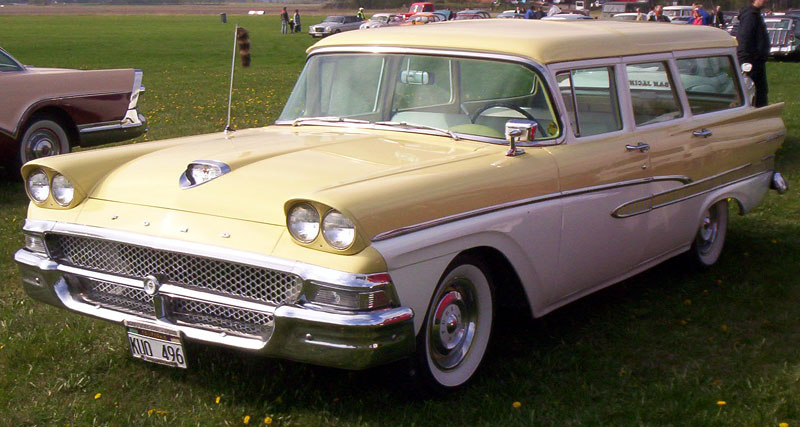
1958 Ford Country Sedan

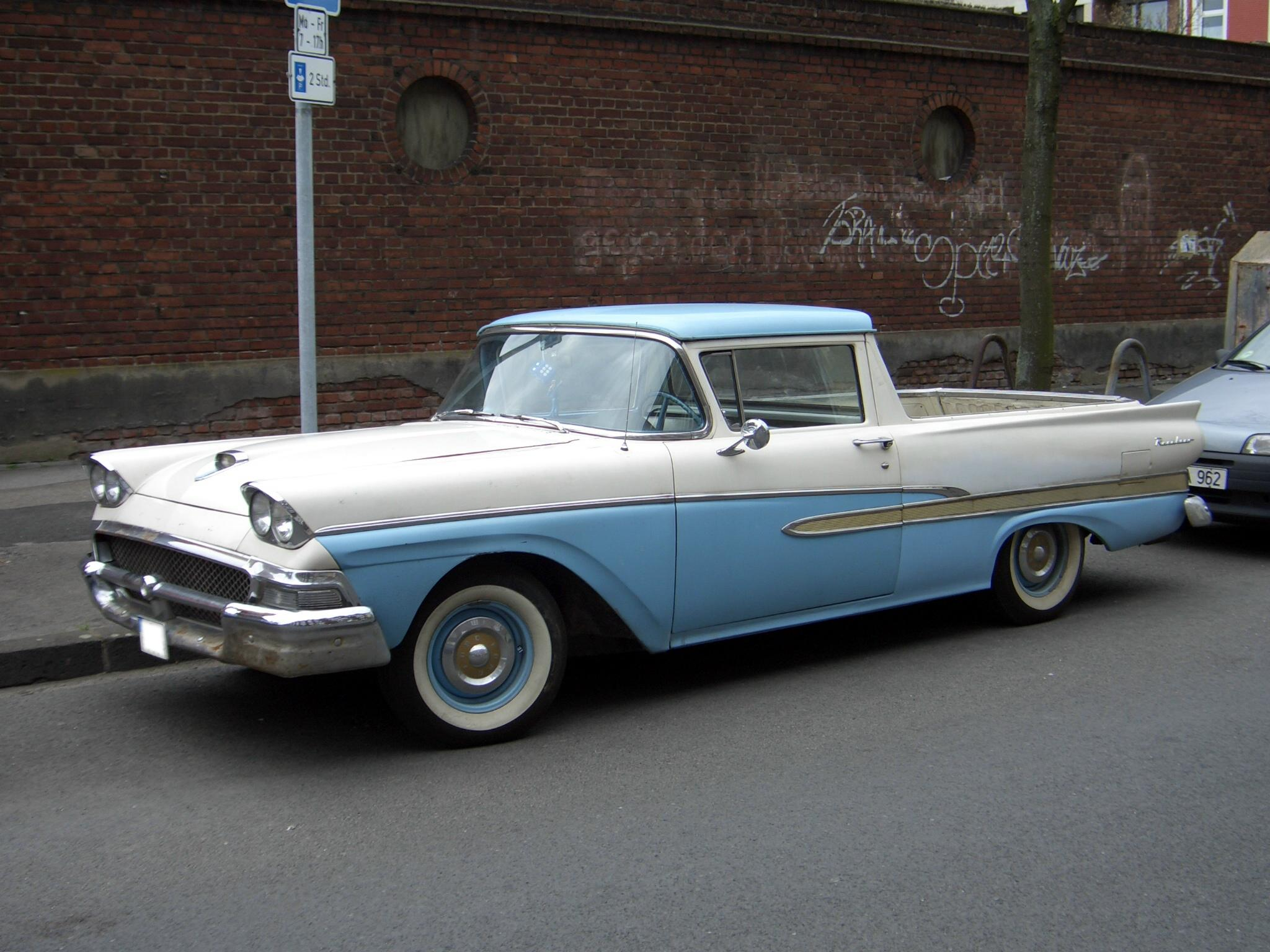
1958 Ford Ranchero

== 1959 ==
The top-line spot for 1959 was the new Galaxie, positioned above the continued Fairlane 500. The Custom line was dropped, with Custom 300 the lowest rung on the ladder, and all 1959 Fords used the long 118 in (2997 mm) wheelbase. New for safety was fully padded armrests and rear door locks that were child proof. American prices ranged from the mid-$1,000 to the low $3,000s. In 1958, a concept car was introduced called "la Galaxie" which incorporated the headlights into pods inline with the grille and a reduced front profile.

This version was also assembled in Australia, beginning in late 1959. Local models were the luxurious Fairlane 500, the lower-priced Custom 300 (both sedans), as well as the Ranch Wagon. The Australian models were powered by the 332 cu in (5.4 L) "Thunderbird" engine, producing 204 hp. For 1960, the range was updated with the grille and trim from the 1959 Canadian Meteor.

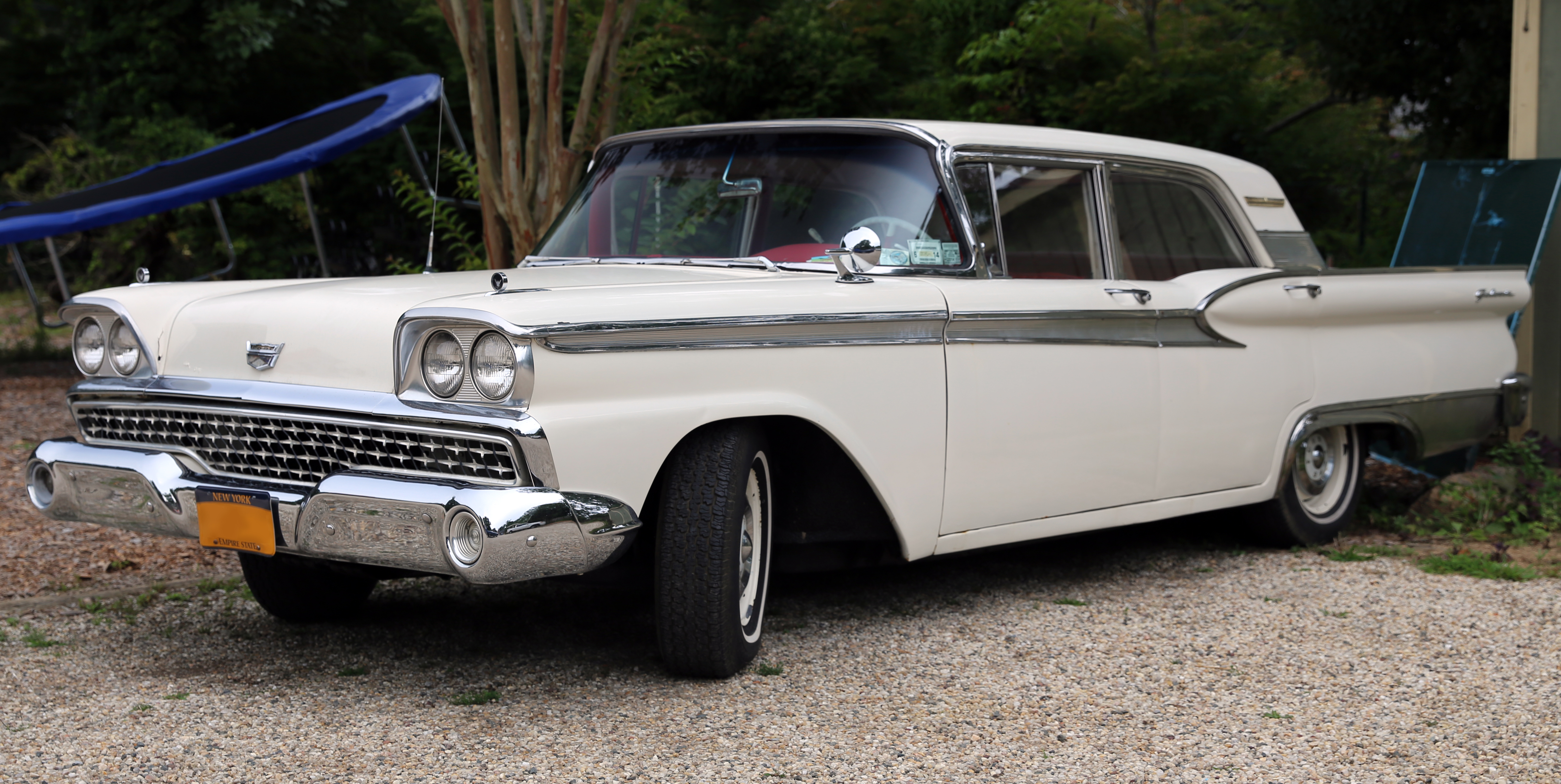
1959 Ford Galaxie Town Sedan

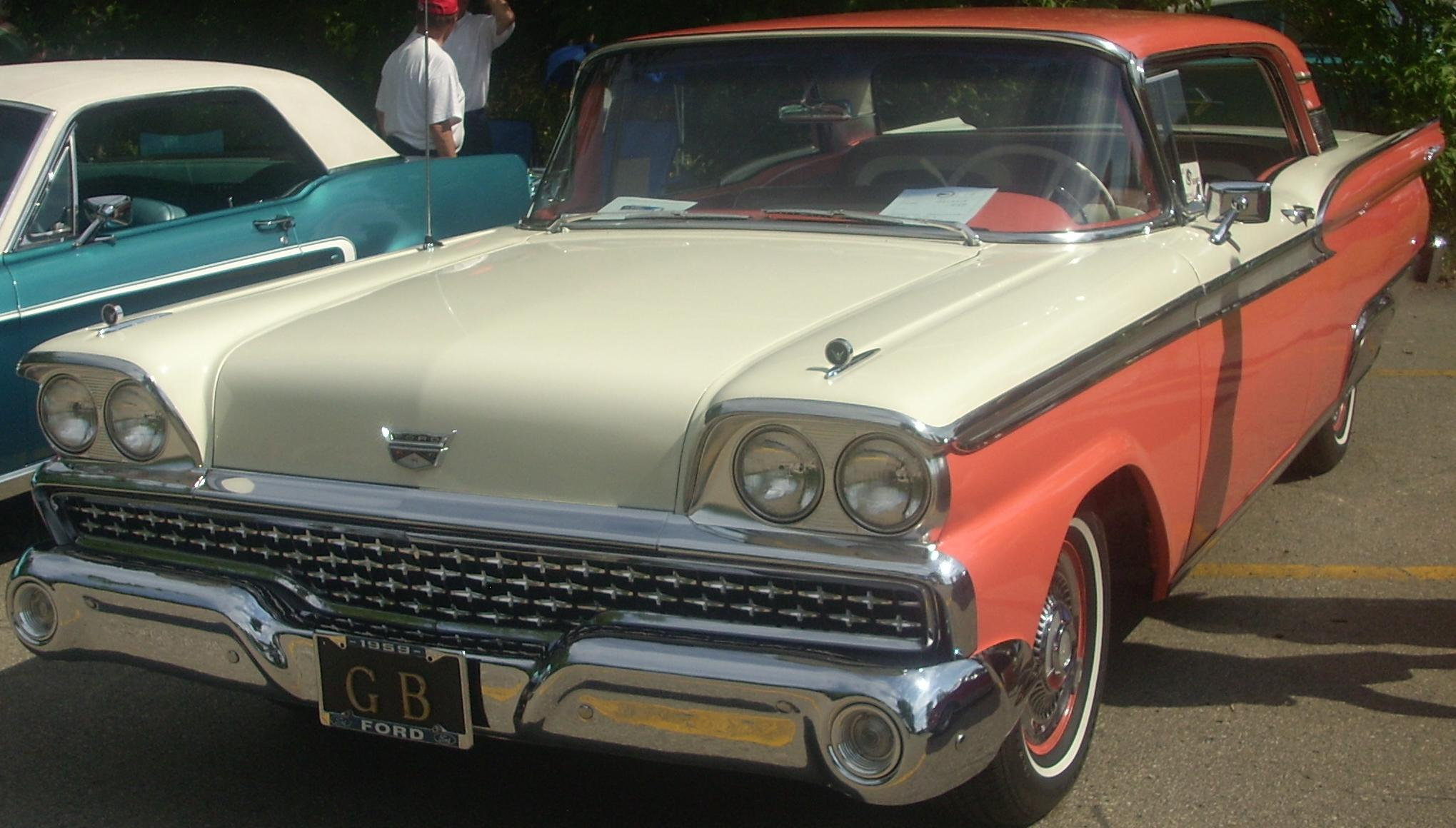
1959 Ford Galaxie Club Victoria

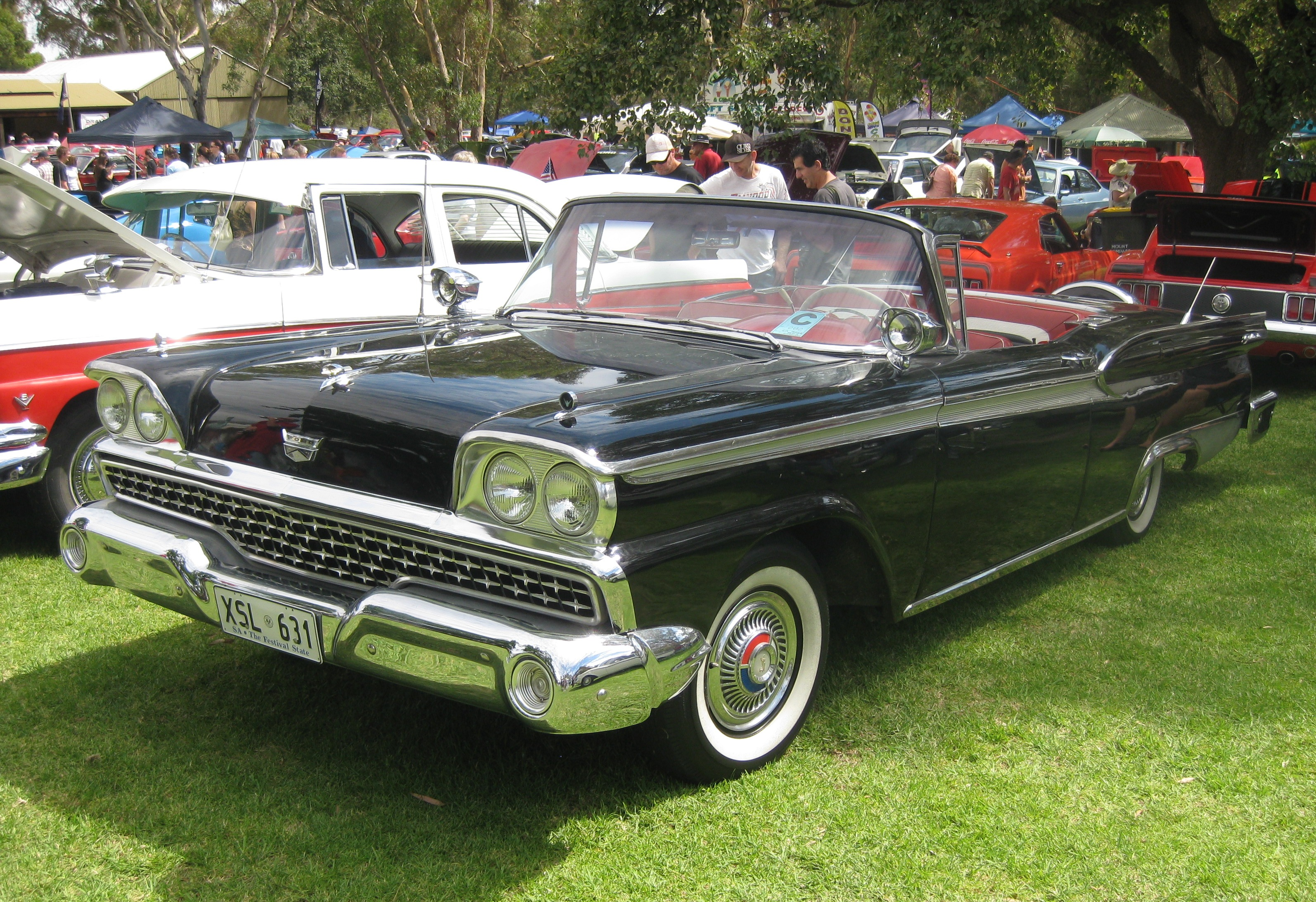
1959 Ford Galaxie Sunliner convertible

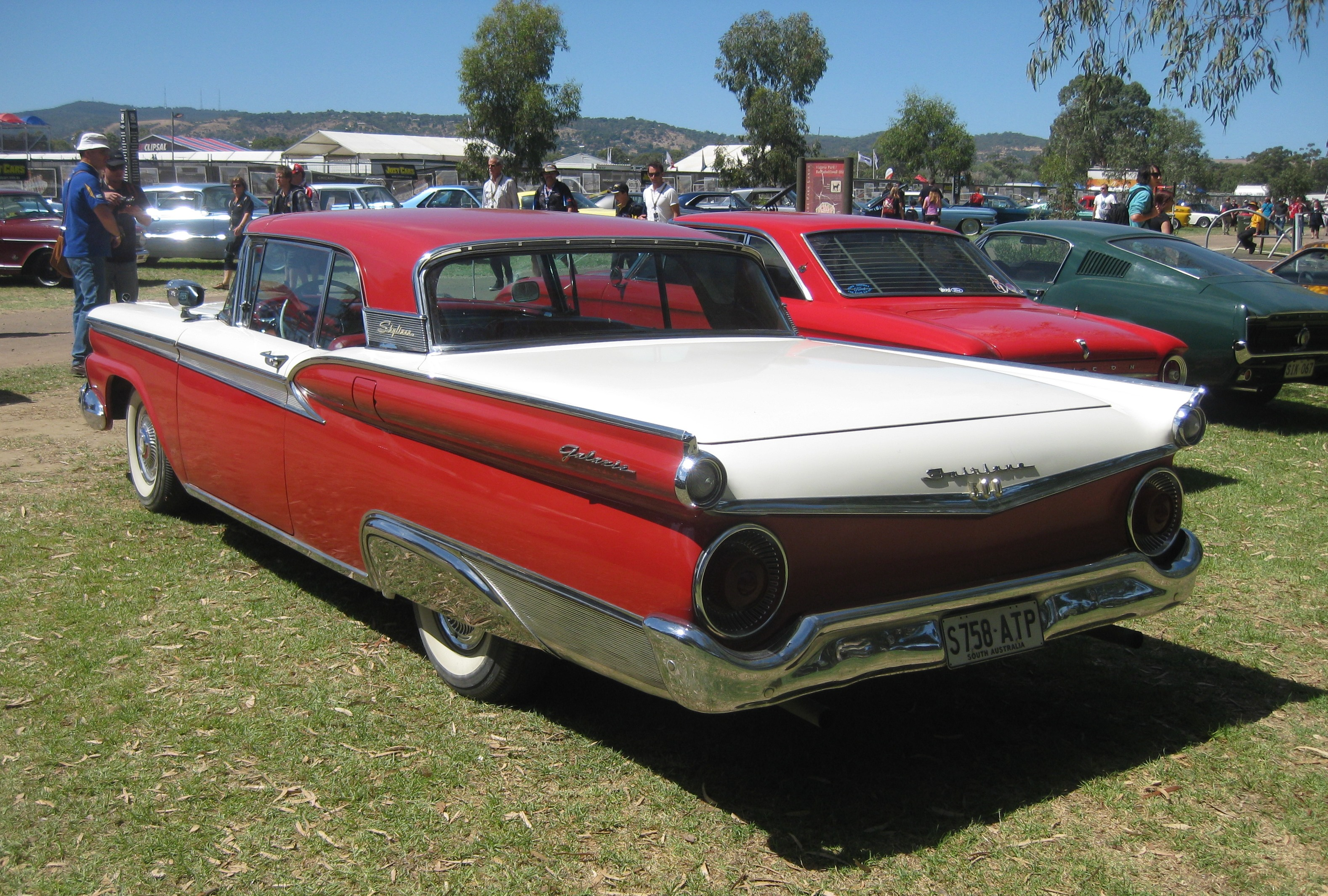
1959 Ford Galaxie Skyliner. 1959 Galaxies carried both Fairlane 500 and Galaxie badges

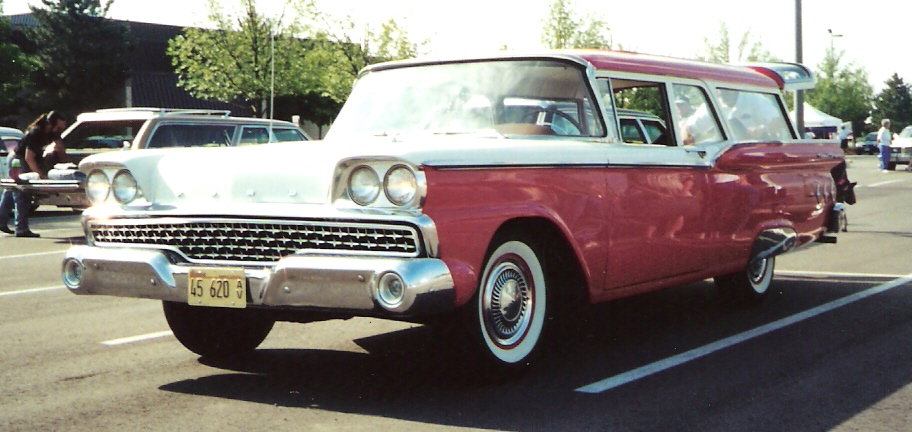
1959 Ford Ranch Wagon (2-door)

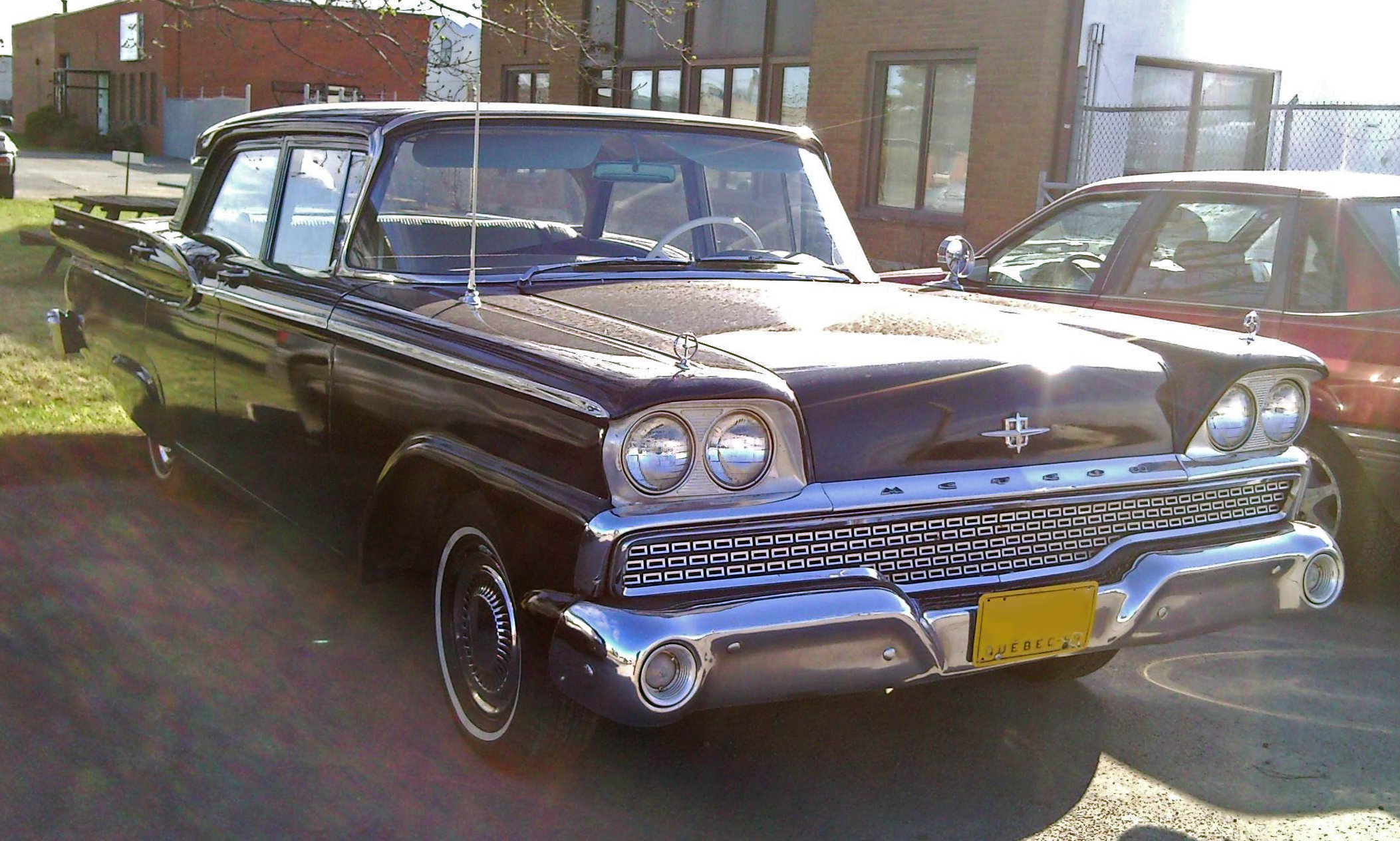
1959 Meteor (Canada)

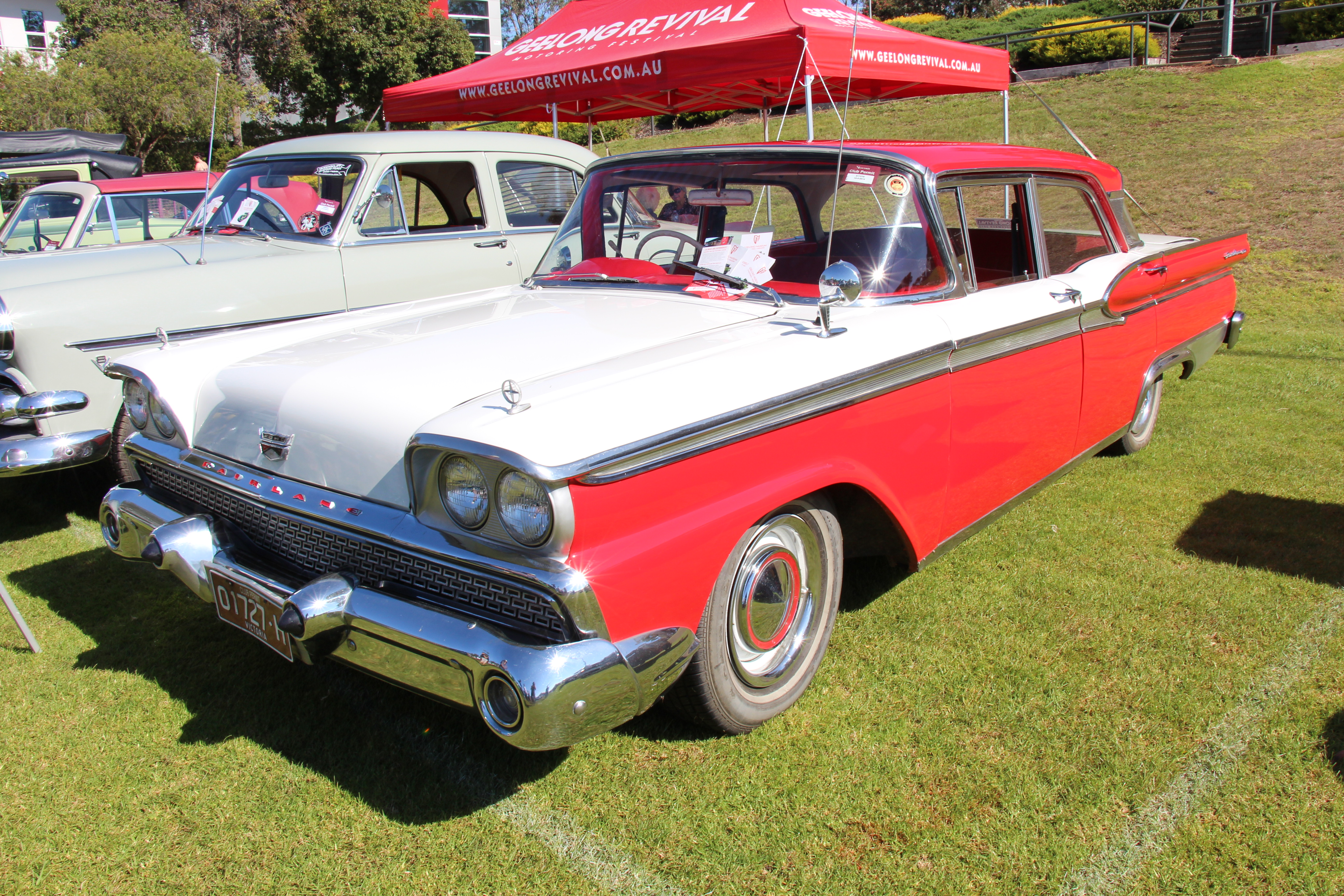
1960-61 Australian built Fairlane 500 with revised grille
