= Mercury Monterey =

Series of full-size cars produced by Mercury (1952-1974)

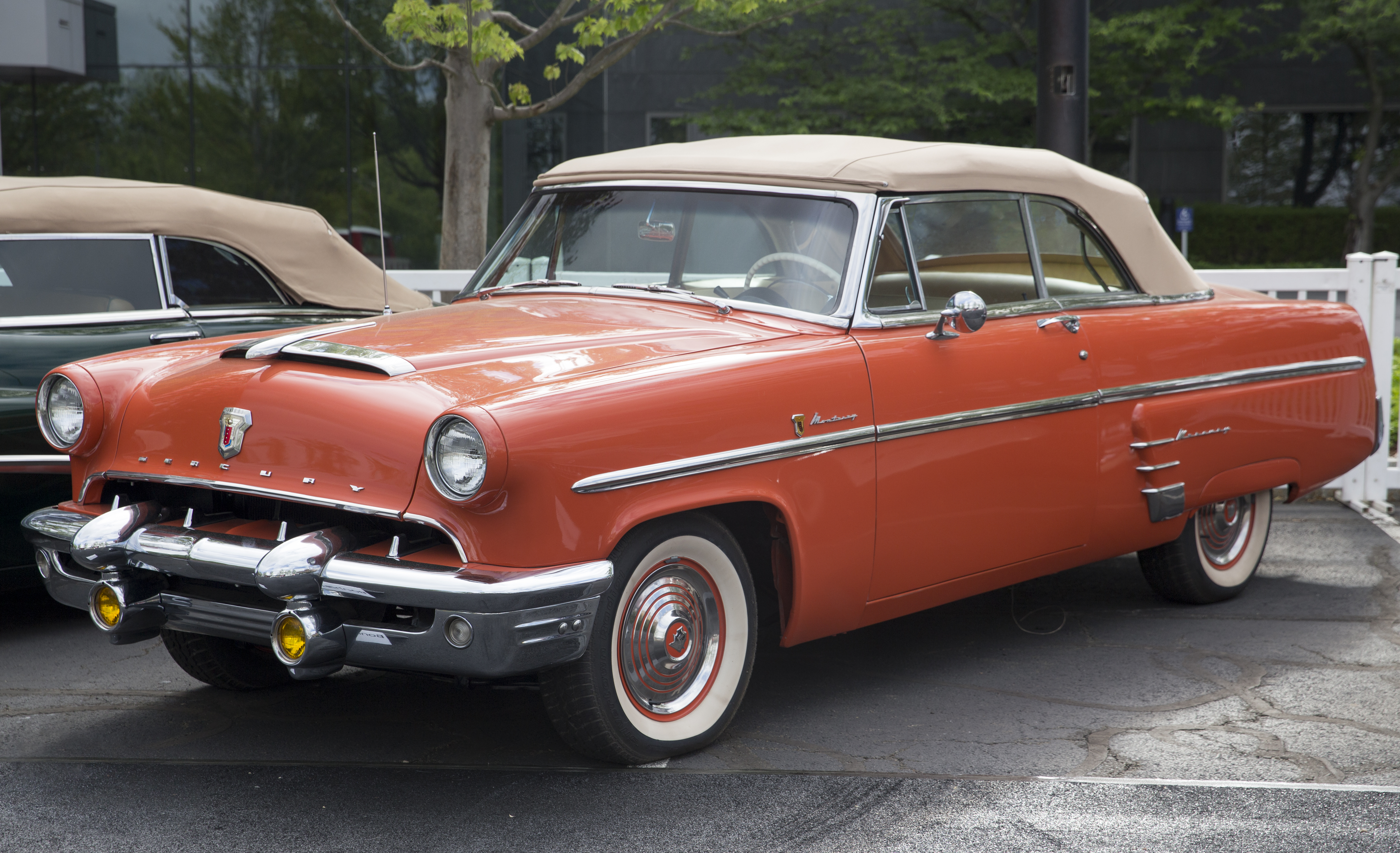
- 1953 Mercury Monterey Special Custom Convertible

Overview
- Manufacturer: Mercury (Ford)
- Production: 1952–1974
- Assembly: Main plant Wayne, Michigan (Branch assembly); St. Louis, Missouri; Maywood, California; Pico Rivera, California; Metuchen, New Jersey

Body and chassis
- Class: Full-size
- Body style: 4-door sedan 2-door sedan 2-door coupe
- Layout: FR layout

Chronology
- Predecessor: Mercury Eight
- Successor: Mercury Marquis

The Mercury Monterey is a series of full-size cars that were manufactured and marketed by the Mercury division of Ford from 1950 to 1974. Deriving its name from Monterey Bay, the initial Mercury Monterey served as the top-of-the-line two-door sedan model for 1950 and 1951 to compete with the hardtop models of Oldsmobile and Buick. It came with a vinyl roof covering, upgraded upholstery, and other features. The hardtop was introduced for 1952. During its production, the Monterey would be offered in multiple body styles, ranging from coupes, convertibles, sedans, hardtops, and station wagons.

Over its 22 years of production, the Monterey served variously as the flagship, mid-range, and entry-level offering of the full-size Mercury product range. The only Mercury nameplate to be in continuous production throughout the 1960s, the Monterey was positioned above the Medalist, Custom, and Meteor; later, it was positioned below the Turnpike Cruiser, Montclair, Park Lane, and finally the Marquis.

Following the 1974 model year, Mercury discontinued the Monterey, consolidating its full-size range down to the Marquis and Colony Park station wagon. For 2004, the Monterey nameplate was revived, becoming the counterpart of the Ford Freestar minivan; it was produced through the 2007 model year.

== Early history ==
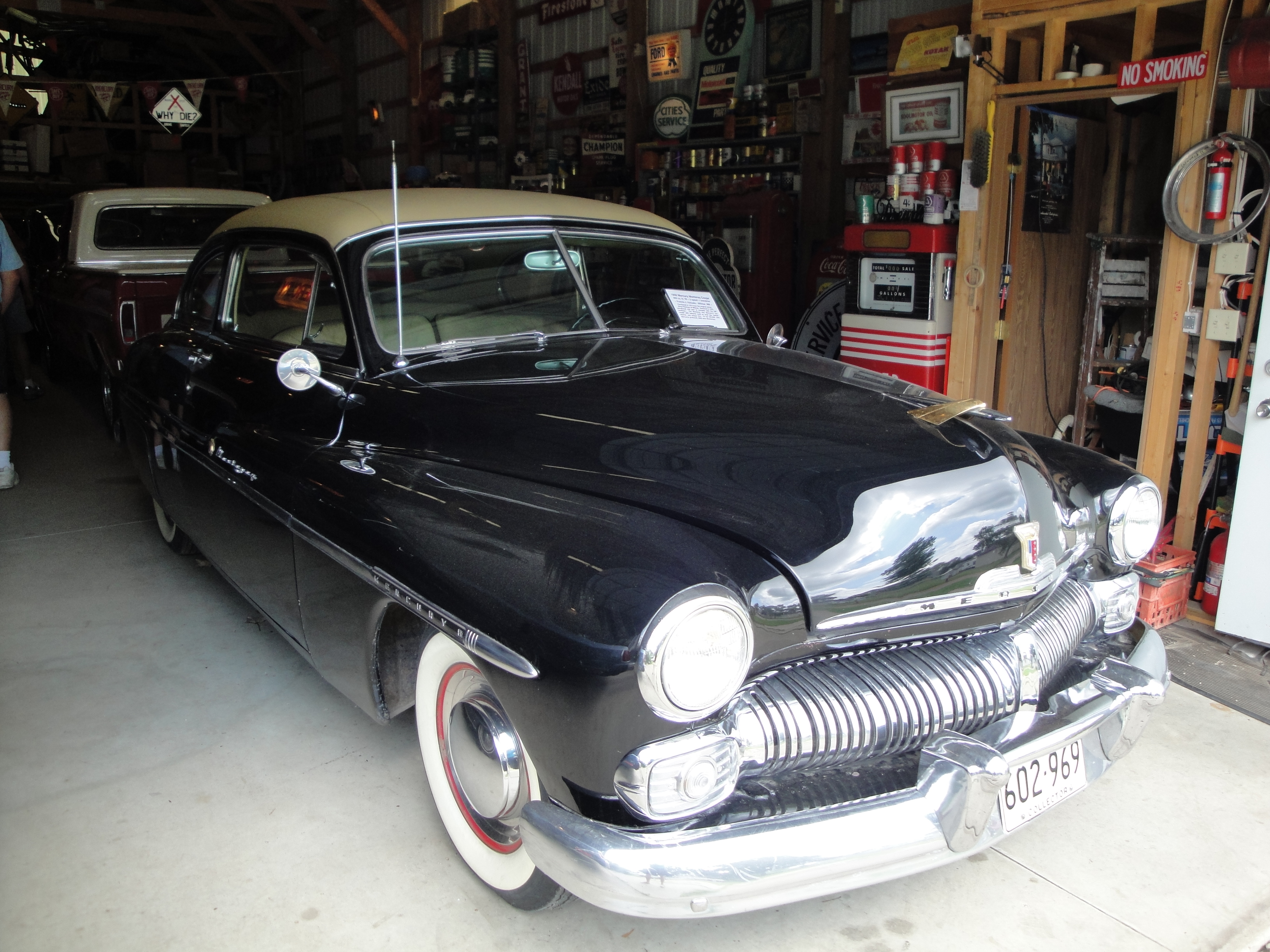
1950 Mercury Monterey

The Monterey (model 72C) was introduced in 1950 as a high-end two-door coupe as part of the Mercury Eight series in the same vein as the Ford Crestliner, the Lincoln Lido coupe and the Lincoln Cosmopolitan Capri coupe in order to compete with the hardtop coupes General Motors and Chrysler had introduced the previous model year. Montereys had either a canvas covered convertible for $2,146 ($28,717 in 2025 dollars) or vinyl for $2,157 ($28,864 in 2025 dollars). Standard features included leather faced seats, simulated leather headliner, wool carpets, chrome-plated interior garnish moldings, two-toned dashboard, special black steering wheel, fender skirts, dual outside rearview mirrors, full wheelcovers & gold winged hood ornament. For $10 more ($134 in 2025 dollars) all leather seats were an option. Two special colors were offered, Turquoise Blue with dark blue top and Cortaro Red metallic with black top. Black with yellow top was also available. Few Montereys were sold.

== 1952–1954 ==
First generation
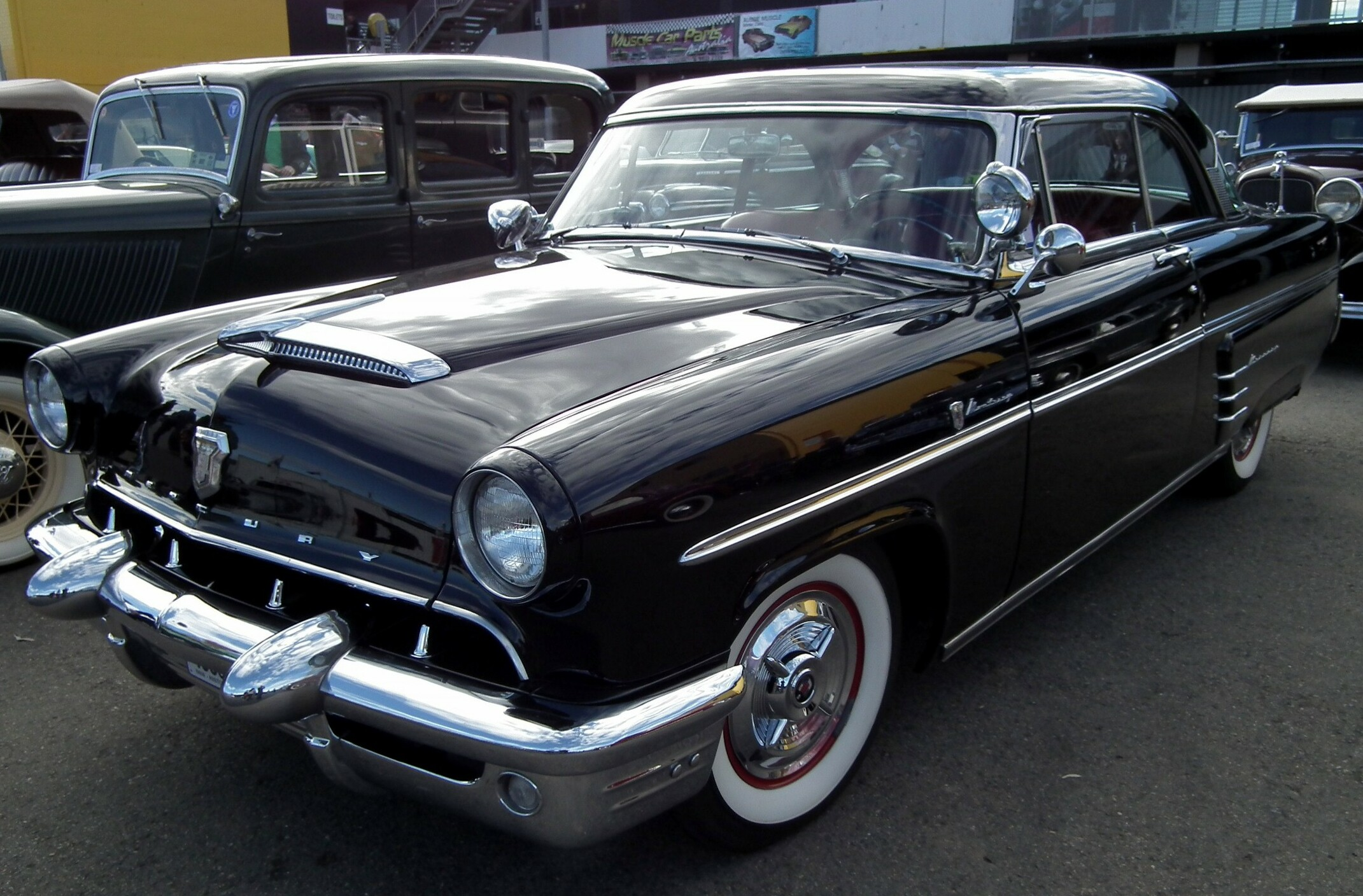
- 1953 Mercury Monterey coupe

Overview
- Model years: 1952–1954

Body and chassis
- Body style: 4-door sedan 2-door hardtop 2-door convertible 4-door station wagon
- Related: Lincoln Cosmopolitian; Lincoln Capri; Mercury Custom; Ford Crestline Skyliner

Powertrain
- Engine: 255 cu in (4.2 L) Flathead V8; 256 cu in (4.2 L) Ford Y-block V8
- Transmission: 3-speed manual 3-speed Merc-O-Matic automatic

Dimensions
- Wheelbase: 118.0 in (2,997 mm)
- Length: 202.2 in (5,136 mm) (1952)
- Width: 73.5 in (1,867 mm)

As Ford began to position Mercury as a mid-priced competitor to the Pontiac Chieftain, Buick Special, Studebaker Commander, Hudson Pacemaker, Kaiser Virginian, Nash Statesman, Dodge Meadowbrook and Dodge Coronet, all Mercury vehicles received a styling and engineering redesign for 1952, such as 18% more window area. Monterey became a separate series and Mercury's top model line over the mainstream Custom nameplate, a convertible and four-door sedan were included in the new series lineup. The heater and vent controls were changed to levers and placed on a plane set perpendicular to the dash behind the steering wheel, inspired by flight controls in large aircraft. The listed retail price was US$2,370 for the convertible ($28,734 in 2025 dollars). Eleven exterior colors were offered and seventeen two-tone color combinations were provided, and the standard list of equipment included broadcloth upholstery, full carpeting, and electric clock, luggage compartment light and chrome window surroundings. Optional equipment included a heater and windshield defroster, radio with antenna, and fog lamps.

A station wagon was first introduced as a Mercury for 1953 including an optional "woodie" appearance, the same year a Siren Red Monterey Convertible became Ford's forty-millionth car produced. 1954 saw the introduction of the new 161 hp (120 kW) overhead valve Ford Y-block V8, as well as the bubble-top Monterey Sun Valley, named for Sun Valley, Idaho, which had a Plexiglas front half roof which was similar to that of the Ford Crestline Skyliner. The color choices expanded considerably to offer fifteen single choices and thirty nine two-tone selections. The 1954 Montereys also received other alterations, such as new, lower taillights. The Mercury XM-800 concept car, first displayed at the Chicago Auto Show early in 1954, débuted as the Mercury Monterey XM-800.

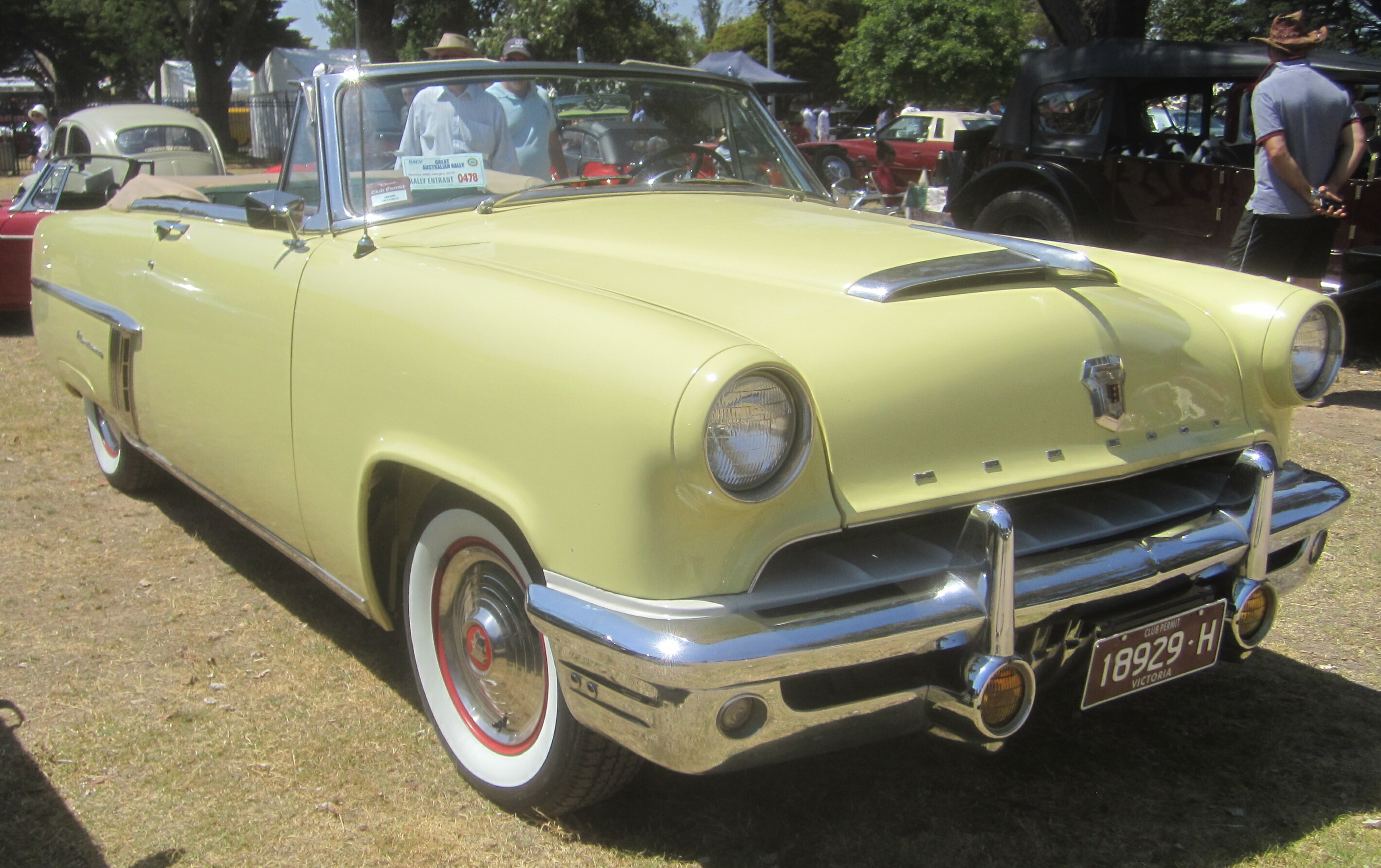
1952 Mercury Monterey Special Custom Convertible

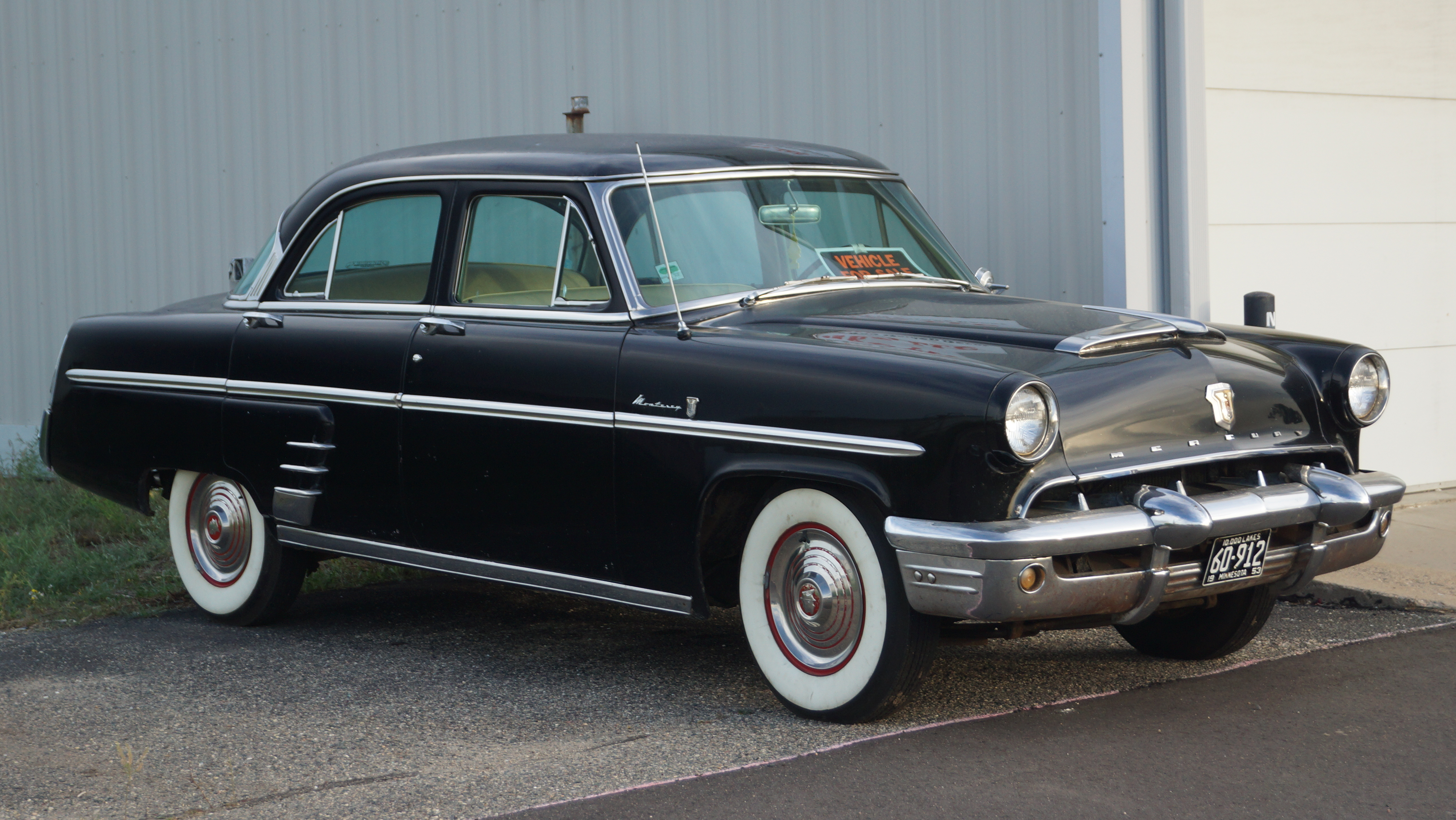
1953 Mercury Monterey 4-door sedan

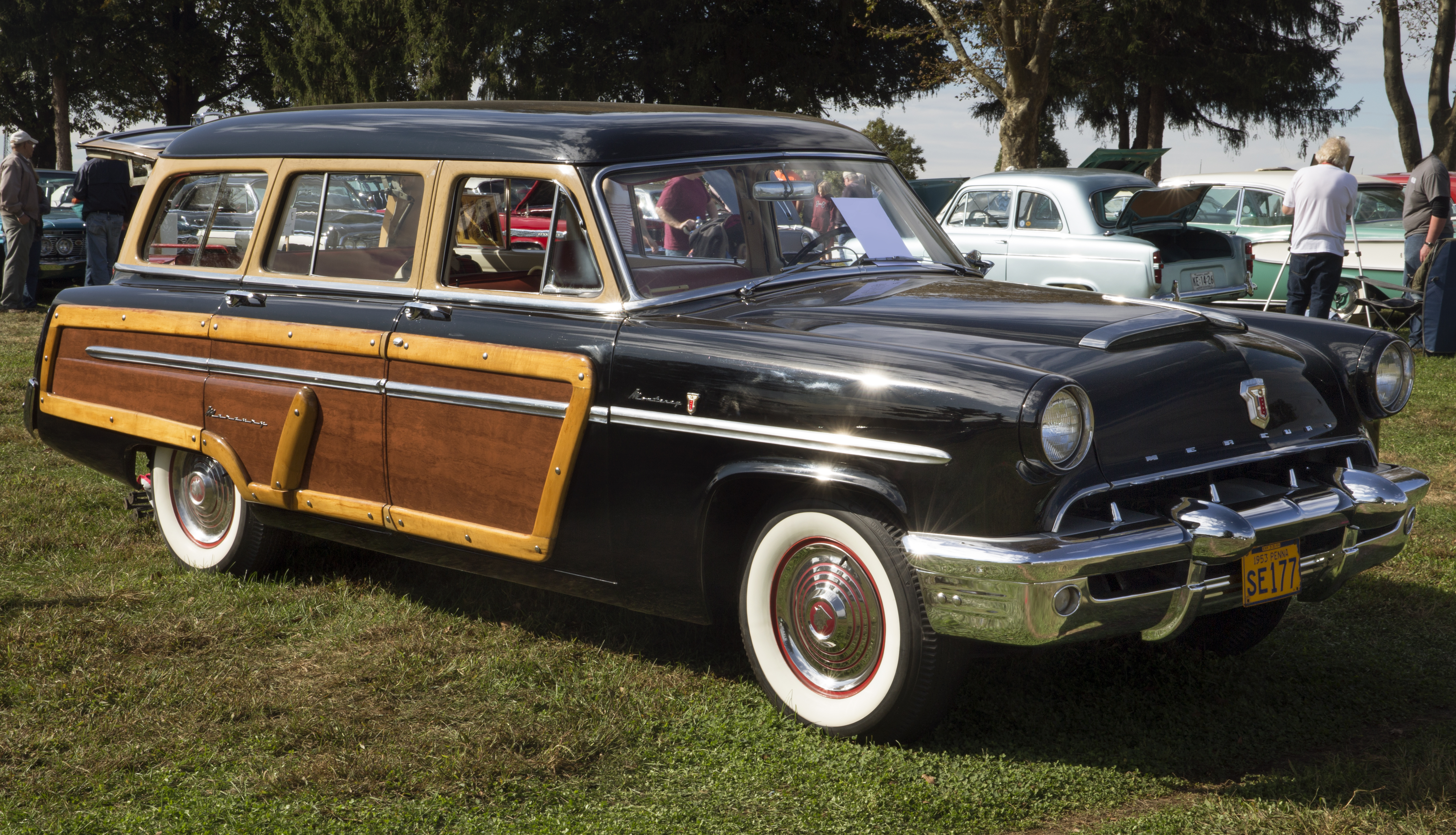
1953 Mercury Monterey station wagon

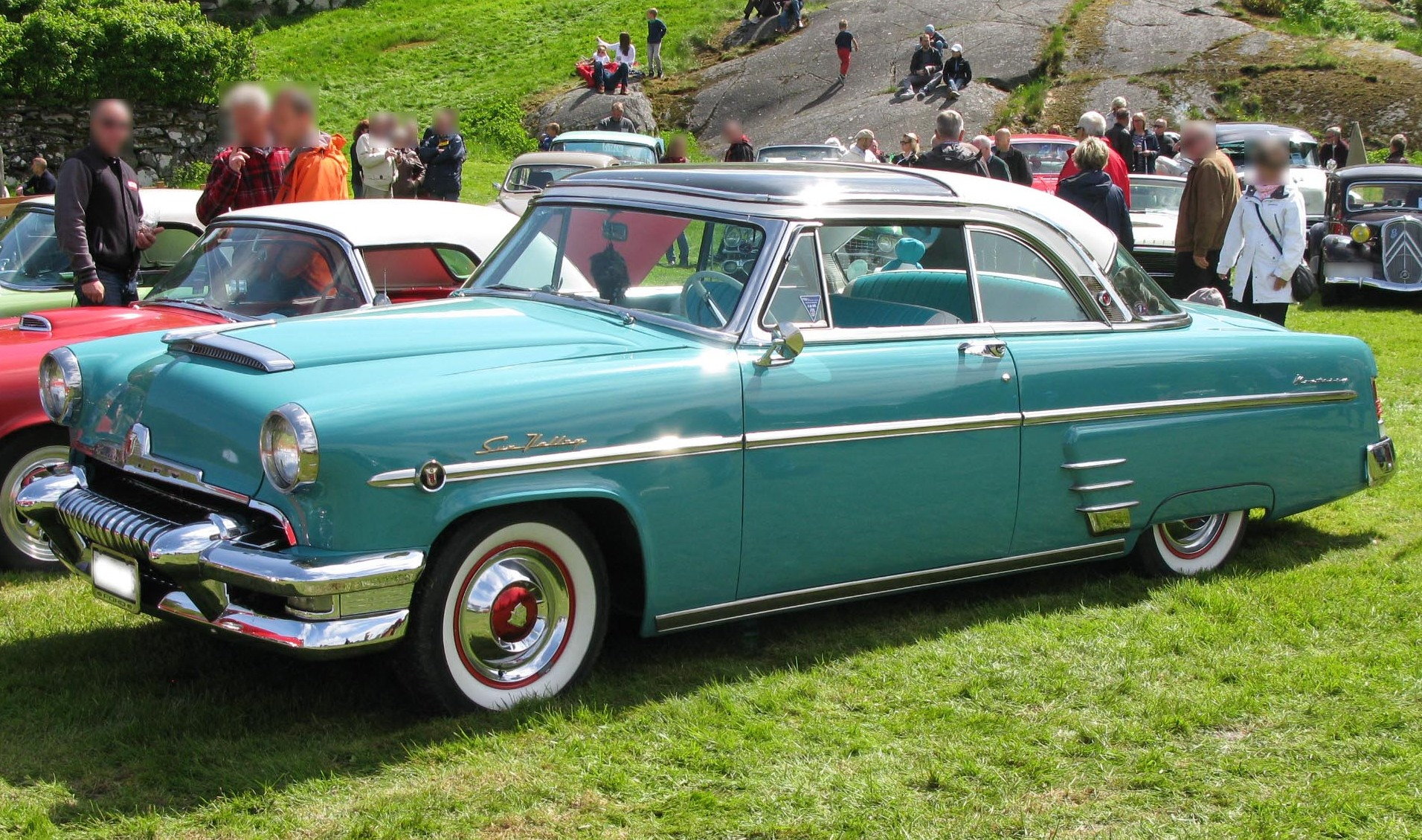
1954 Mercury Monterey Sun Valley

== 1955–1956 ==
Second generation
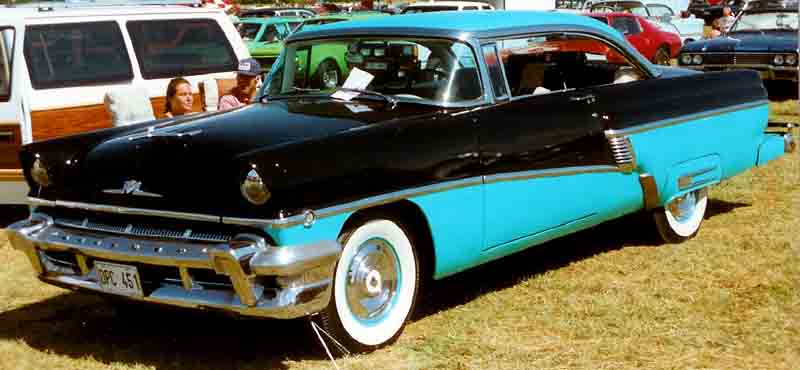
- 1956 Mercury Monterey Coupe with "Flo-tone" paint combination of Niagara Blue over Tuxedo Black

Overview
- Model years: 1955–1956

Body and chassis
- Body style: 4-door sedan 4-door hardtop 2-door hardtop 2-door convertible 4-door station wagon
- Related: Lincoln Capri; Mercury Custom; Mercury Medalist; Mercury Montclair; Ford Fairlane

Powertrain
- Engine: 292 cu in (4.8 L) Ford Y-block V8; 312 cu in (5.1 L) Ford Y-block V8
- Transmission: 3-speed manual 3-speed Merc-O-Matic automatic Touch-O-Matic overdrive

Dimensions
- Wheelbase: 119.0 in (3,023 mm); 118.0 in (2,997 mm) (wagons)
- Length: 206.3 in (5,240 mm)
- Width: 76.4 in (1,941 mm)
- Height: 62.4 in (1,585 mm)

For 1955 the car lost its status as Mercury's top model, replaced by the Montclair. The same year, it gained the 292 cu in (4.8 L) Y-block from the Thunderbird, producing 188 hp (140 kW) with the standard transmission or 198 with the Merc-O-Matic. It used independent ball-joint front suspension. Brake size was increased. The Monterey was positioned above the base model Custom series for the 1955 model year. Optionally available was a dual 4-barrel carburetor setup that provided 260 hp (190 kW) starting in 1956. All Mercury's for 1955 offered a canted hood over the headlights previously introduced on the Mercury XM-800 concept car from 1954. The 1955 four-door sedan was US$2,400 ($28,845 in 2025 dollars) and sold 70,392.

1956 brought another new engine, the 235 hp (175 kW) 312 cu. in and all Mercury sedans underwent an exterior revision, trading its crest badge for a "Big M" emblem. The side trim was revised to a full-length multi-tier chrome spear, with two types of two-tone paint combinations, offering the traditional approach of a roof color over a different body color, and "Flo-tone" where the roof and lower body were painted in one color and the upper body painted in another color. There were a total of thirty-one two-tone combinations and twenty-eight "Flo-tone" combinations. As was the case with the Montclair, the pillared low-roof four-door Sport Sedan (new to the Monterey series after its mid-1955 introduction as a Montclair exclusive) was replaced by the Monterey Phaeton four-door hardtop during the model year.

The update brought several functional revisions, including a 12-volt electric system which allowed the installation of power operated accessories to be installed including air conditioning, standard dual exhaust to improve engine performance, and an automatic self-lubrication system (for the steering and front suspension). Mercury added its own version of the Ford Lifeguard safety system; a deep-dish steering wheel was standard, along with safety door locks, tubeless tires, and a breakaway safety glass rearview mirror. In addition, childproof rear door locks, seatbelts, and a padded dashboards were introduced as free-standing options. The 292 V8 was replaced by a 312 cubic-inch V8, producing 225 hp.

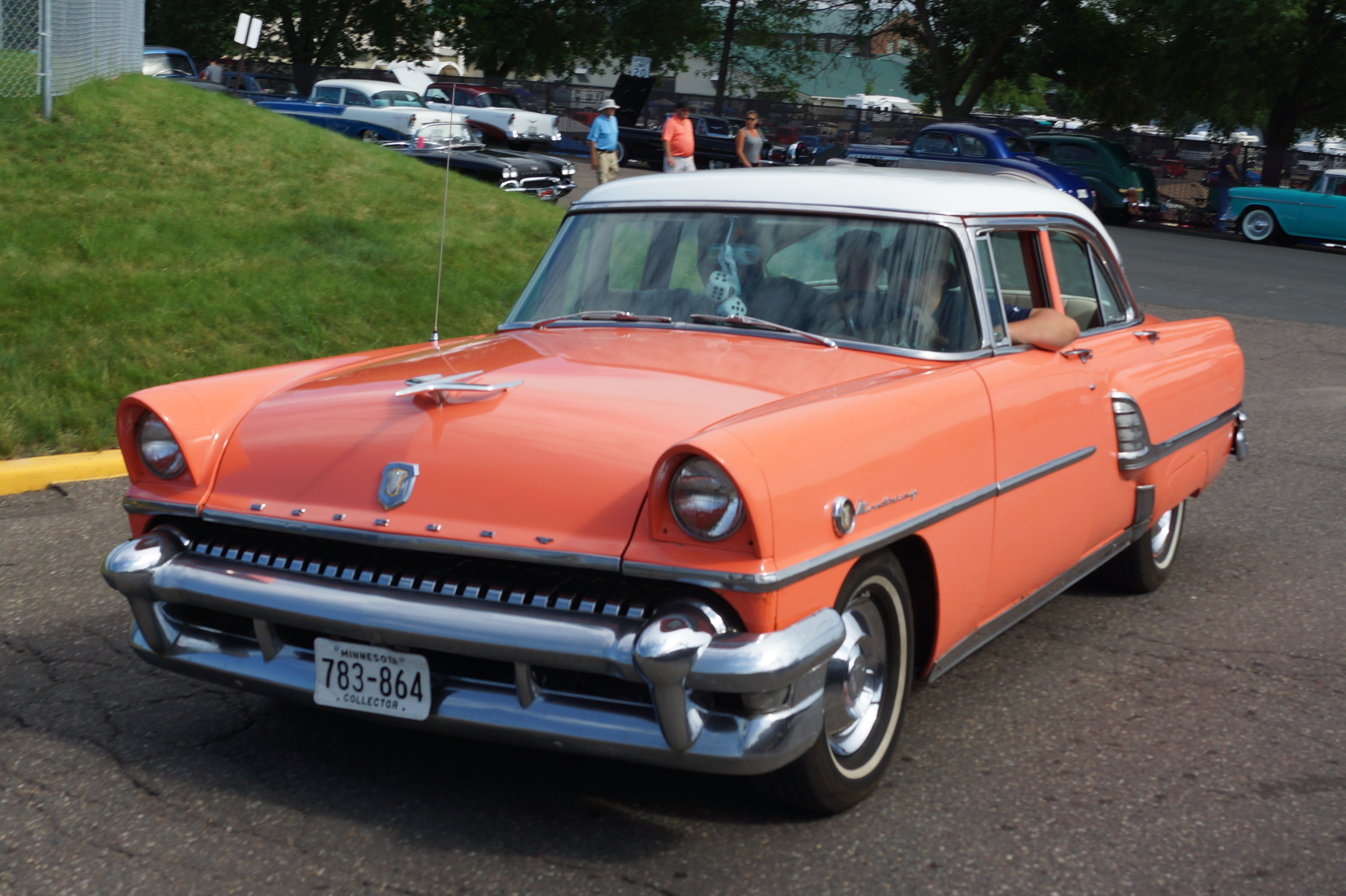
1955 Mercury Monterey 4-door sedan

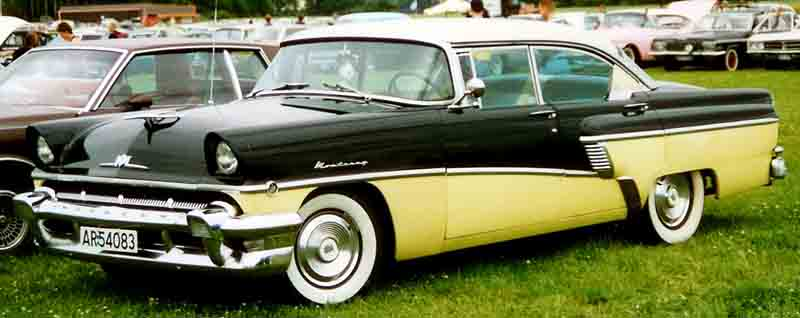
1956 Mercury Monterey 4-door Sport Sedan

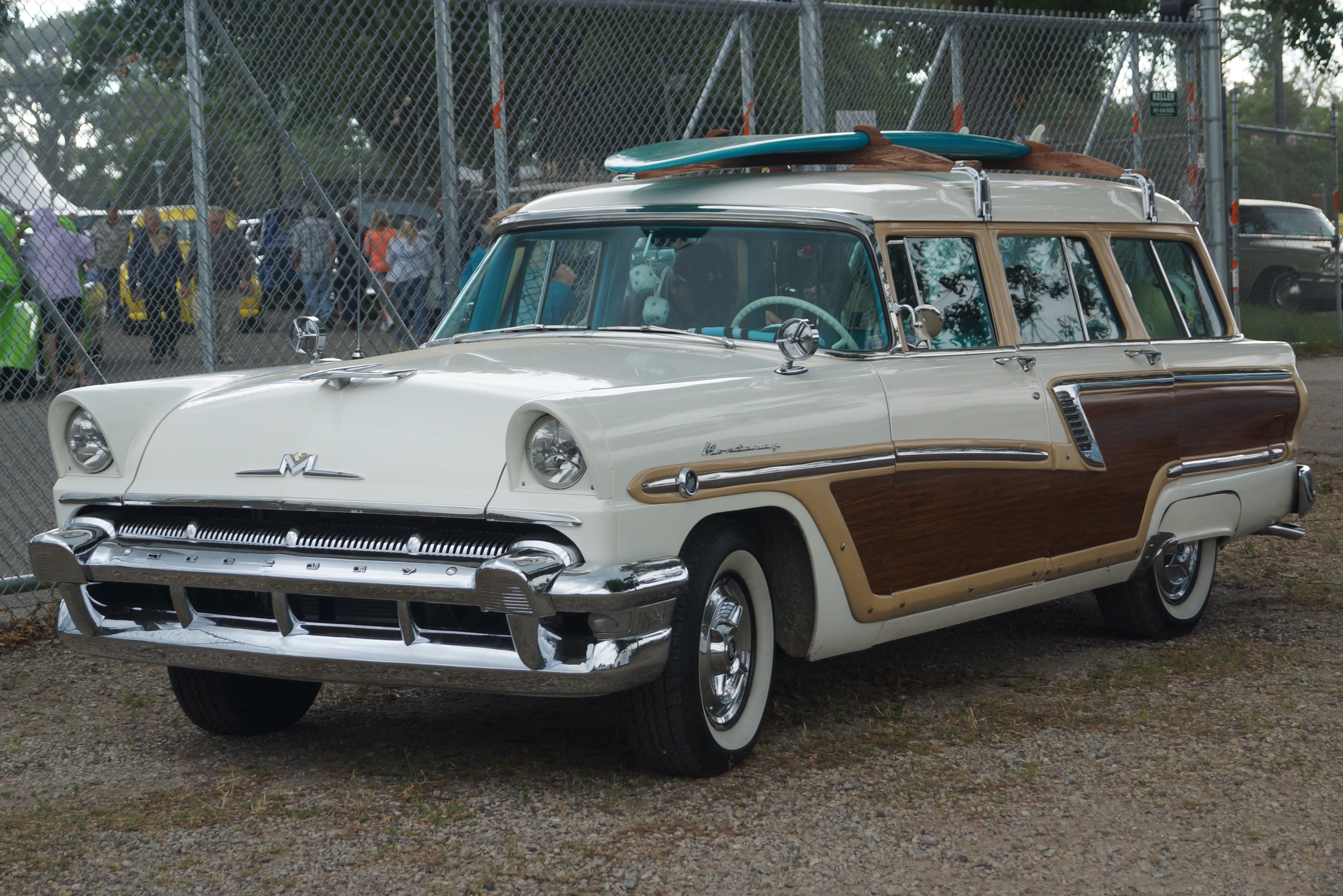
1956 Mercury Monterey station wagon

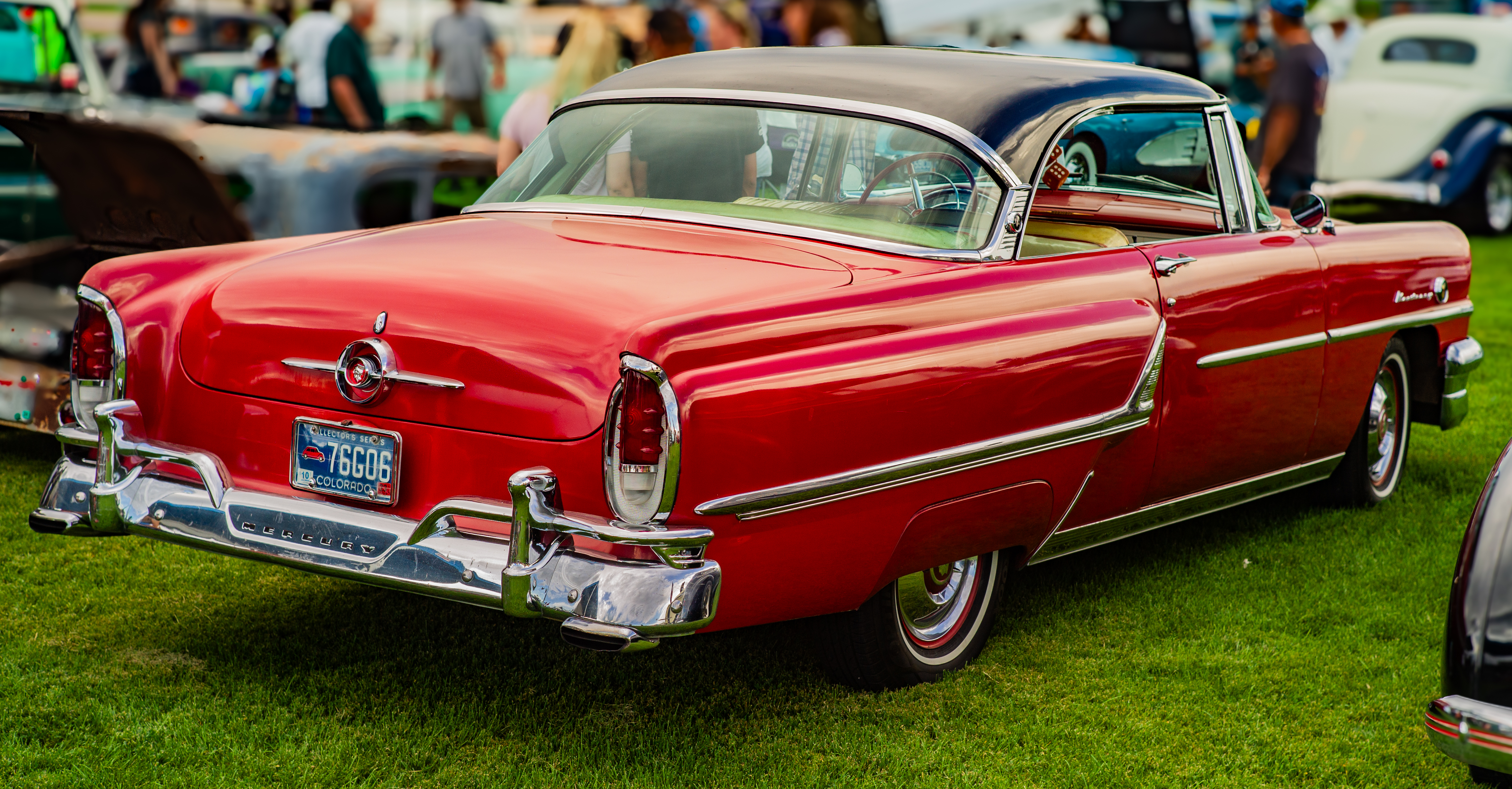
1955 Mercury Monterey Coupe in Huntsman Red

== 1957–1958 ==
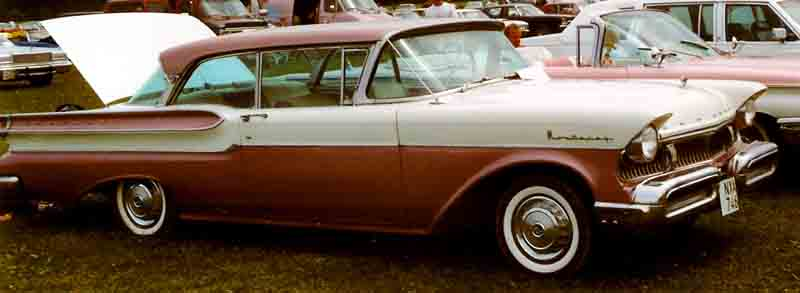
1957 Mercury Monterey coupe

Third generation
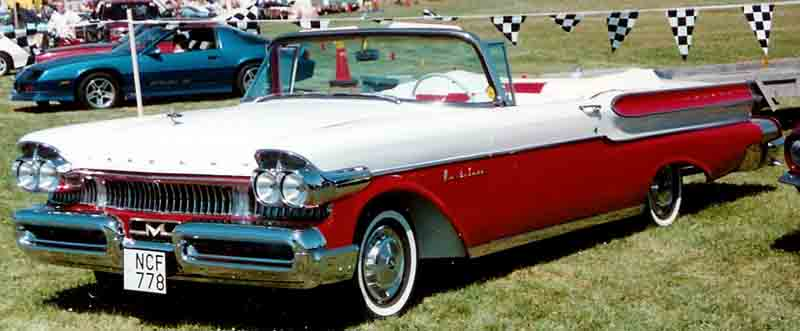
- 1957 Mercury Monterey Convertible

Overview
- Model years: 1957–1958

Body and chassis
- Body style: 4-door sedan 4-door hardtop 2-door sedan 2-door hardtop 2-door convertible
- Related: Mercury Turnpike Cruiser; Mercury Montclair; Mercury Colony Park; Mercury Voyager; Mercury Commuter; Ford Fairlane 500

Powertrain
- Engine: 312 cu in (5.1 L) Ford Y-block V8; 368 cu in (6.0 L) Lincoln Y-Block V8; 383 cu in (6.3 L) MEL V8; 430 cu in (7.0 L) MEL V8
- Transmission: 3-speed manual 3-speed Merc-O-Matic automatic

Dimensions
- Wheelbase: 122.0 in (3,099 mm)
- Length: 211.1 in (5,362 mm)
- Width: 79.1 in (2,009 mm)
- Curb weight: 3,870 lb (1,760 kg)

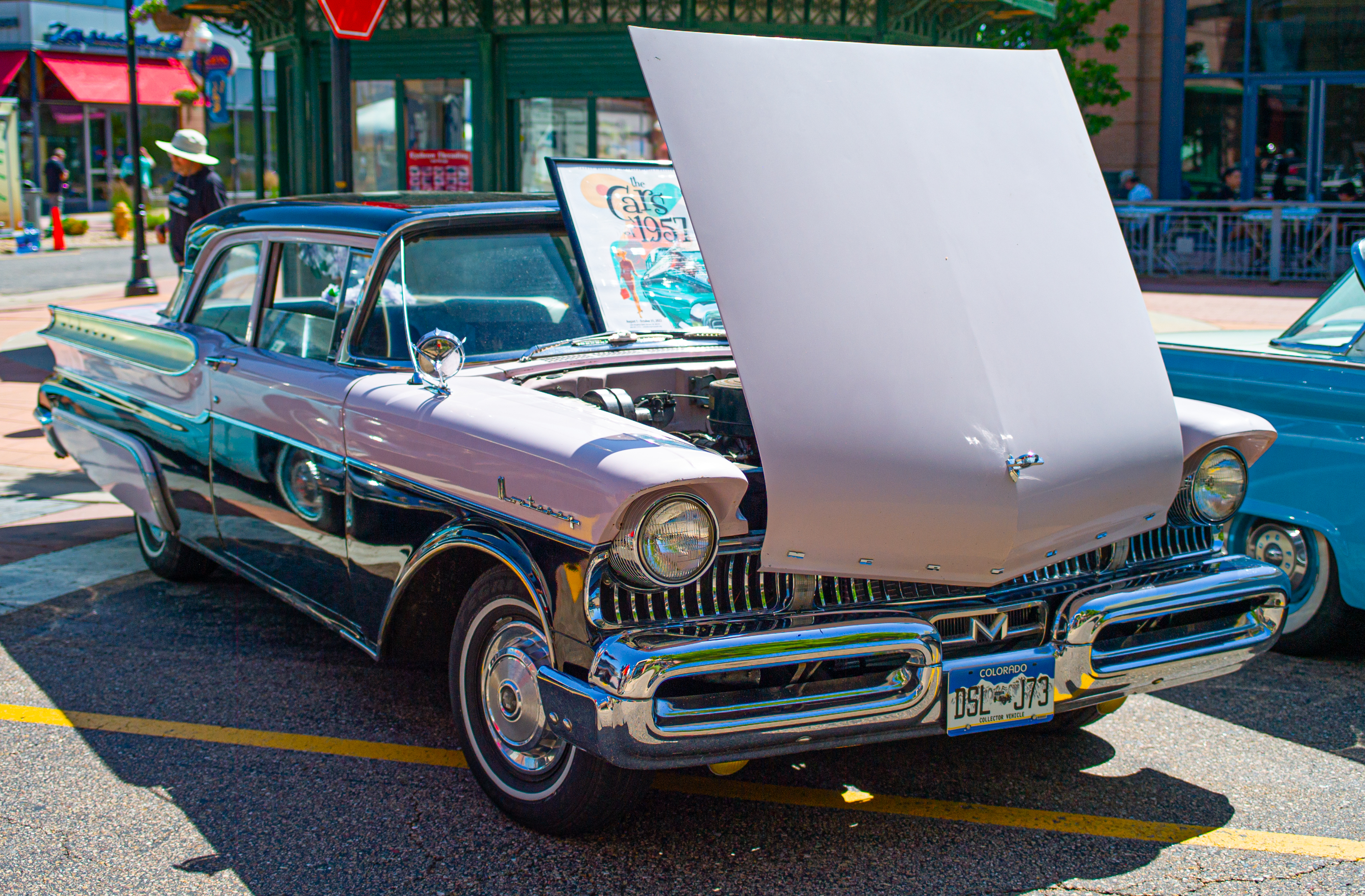
1957 Mercury Monterey in Sunset Orchid and Black two-tone

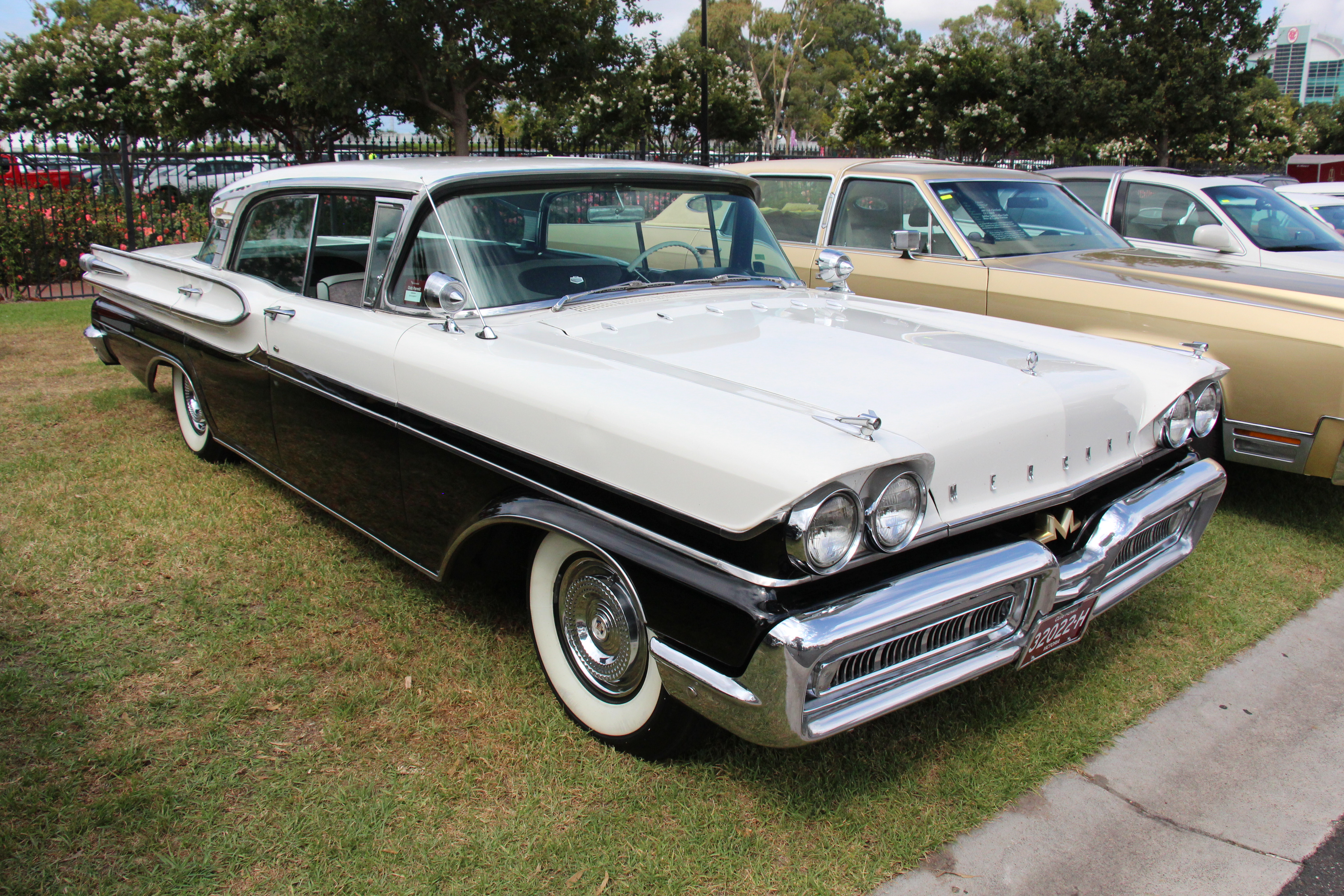
1958 Mercury Monterey Phaeton 4-Door Hardtop

The fullsize Mercury was redesigned for 1957 and grew considerably larger as well, riding on an exclusive 122 in (3,099 mm) wheelbase, elevating Mercury above the new Edsel product line. A new frame design allowed a lower floor which made the car look lower and longer. Interior features included a front seat track stop to keep the front seat back from breaking loose, a new design for the safety steering wheel, a new radio, and memory power front seats. The station wagons were divested from the Monterey series, with the Commuter, Voyager, and Colony Park lines and becoming their own series called the "Country Cruiser" in 1959. The 312 Ford Y-block gained 20 horsepower to go with the added weight, and the 290 hp (220 kW) 368 cu in (6.0 L) Lincoln Y-block V8 became an option. Early 1957 Montereys had two headlights however later examples were fitted with four with the turn signals positioned in the headlight alcove above the headlights. Optional turn signal indicators were installed above the headlights to signify to the driver that the lights were functioning.

1958 brought an all-new engine: the 383 cu in (6.3 L) MEL V8. With the new engine came the Multi-Drive three-speed automatic transmission. As tailfins became to gain favor with competitors, Mercury sought to downplay the appearance and offered similar appearances but with much less dramatic bodywork.

For 1957, Mercury offered mechanically activated pushbutton transmission controls in response to the Chrysler TorqueFlite pushbutton controls introduced in 1956. The Mercury control buttons initially offered five buttons and was called "Keyboard Control", with a long button on top labeled "Drive" with four smaller buttons below labeled "Brake", "Neutral Start" which would allow the engine to start with the ignition key, "Hill Control" and "Reverse" with later versions separating the "Drive" button to "Performance" and "Cruising" for 1958 and relabeled as "Multi-Drive". A separate push/pull lever was included below the control buttons labeled "Park" which would lock out the control buttons until the Park button was pulled to release it. The control panel was installed to the left of the steering wheel. In 1959 the keyboard control was discontinued and used a steering column gear selector lever.

== 1959–1960 ==
Fourth generation
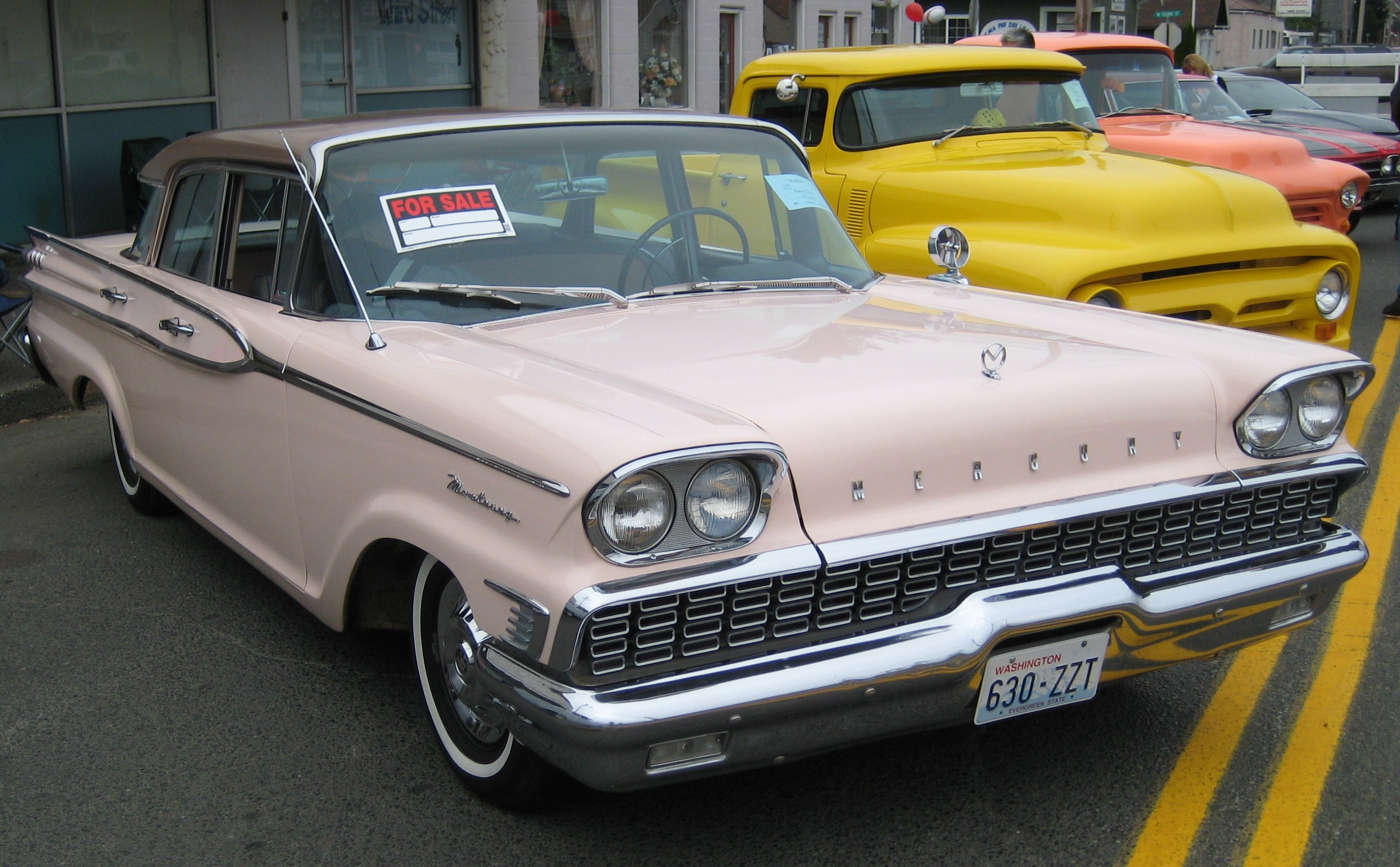
- 1959 Mercury Monterey 4-door sedan

Overview
- Model years: 1959–1960

Body and chassis
- Body style: 2-door sedan 4-door sedan 4-door hardtop (Cruiser); 2-door hardtop (Cruiser); 2-door convertible
- Related: Mercury Park Lane; Mercury Montclair

Powertrain
- Engine: 312 cu in (5.1 L) Ford Y-block V8; 383 cu in (6.3 L) MEL V8
- Transmission: 3-speed manual 3-speed Merc-O-Matic automatic

Dimensions
- Wheelbase: 126.0 in (3,200 mm)
- Length: 1959: 217.8 in (5,532 mm); 1960: 219.2 in (5,568 mm)
- Width: 81.5 in (2,070 mm)
- Height: 55.8 in (1,417 mm)

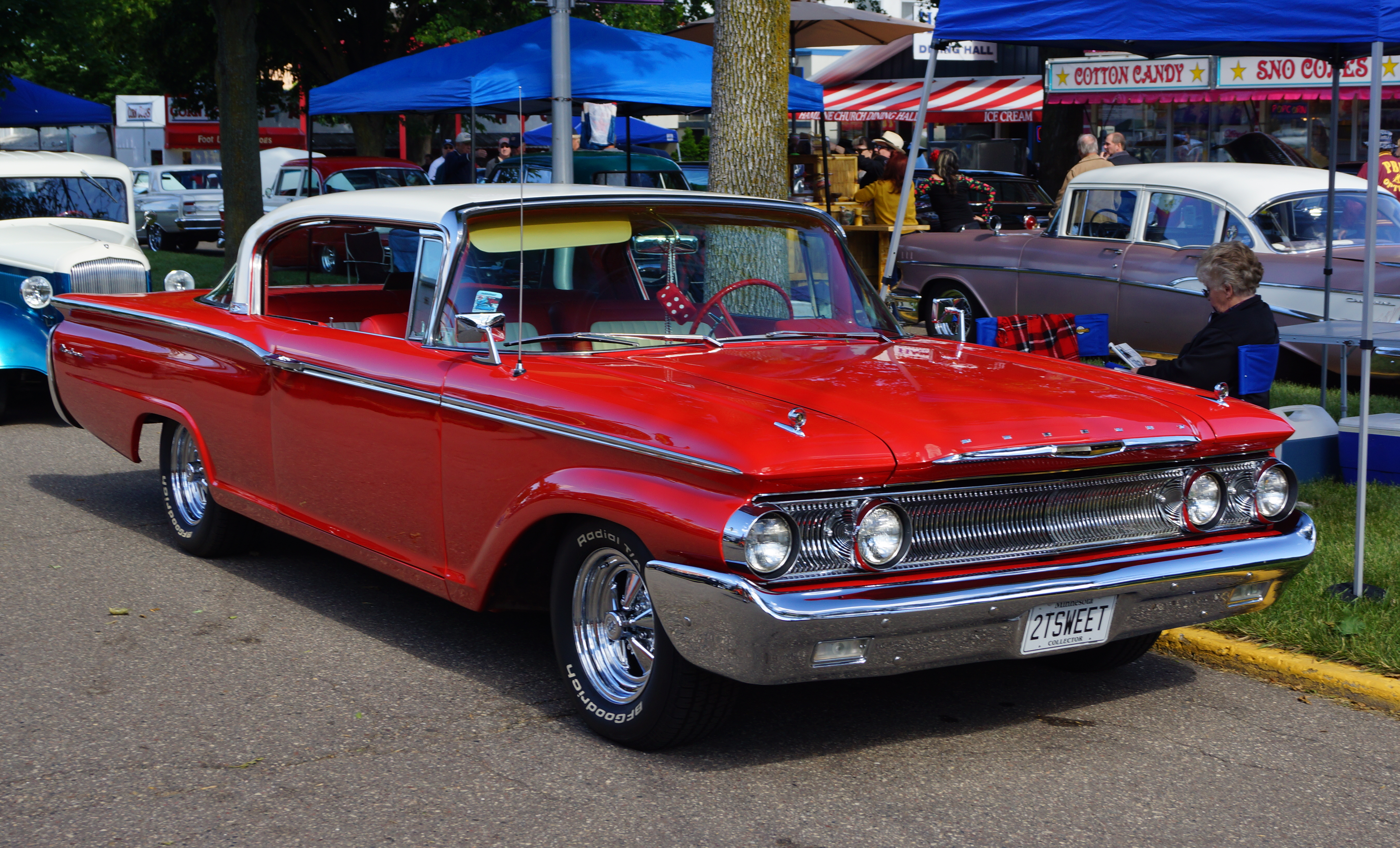
1960 Mercury Monterey 2-Door Hardtop Cruiser (with aftermarket wheels)

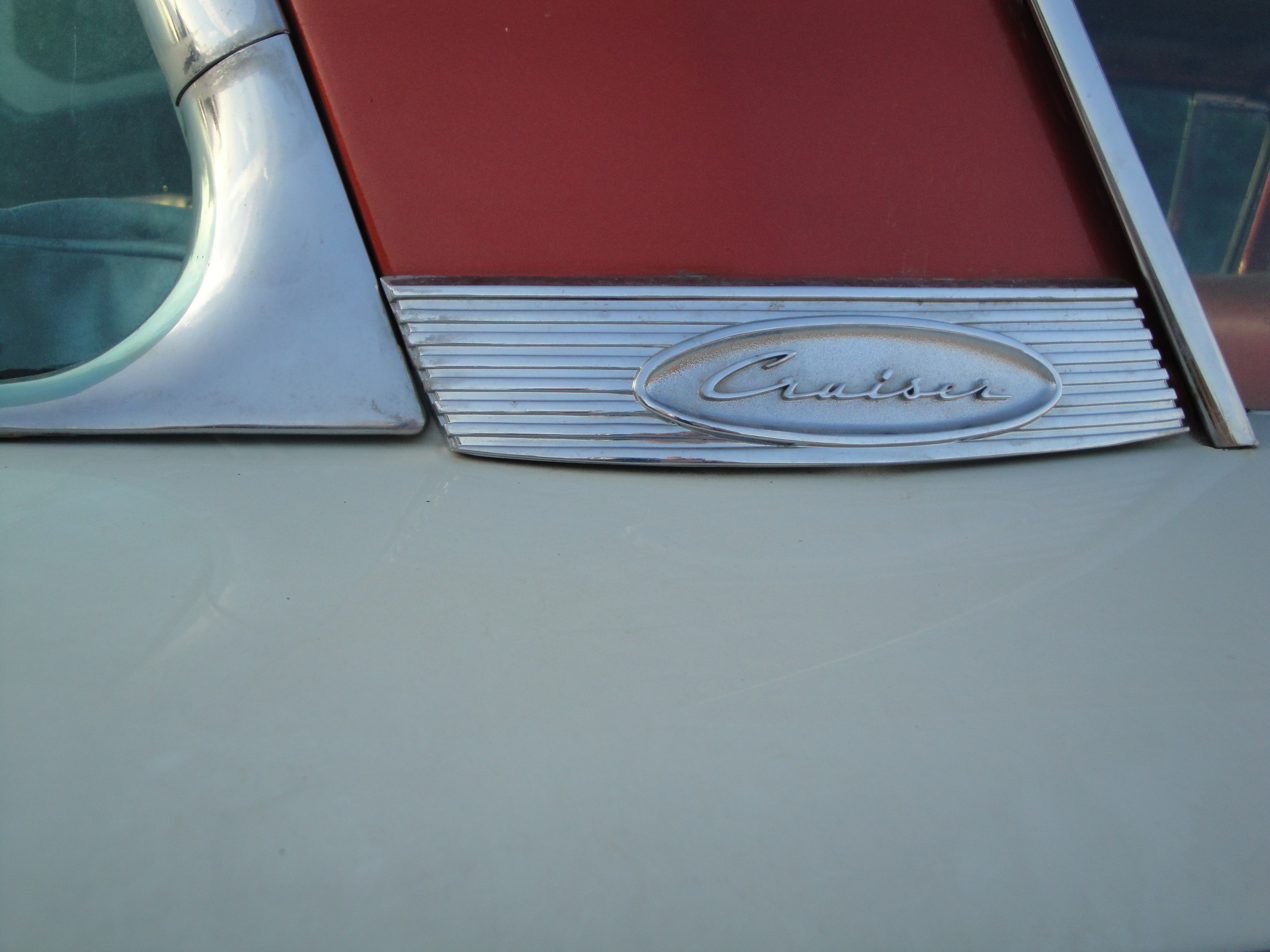
Cruiser badge on 1960 Monterey roof pillar

For 1959, the Mercury Monterey (and Montclair) grew in size, adopting a 126-inch wheelbase. The Mercury-derived Edsel Corsair and Edsel Citation were discontinued; for the first time since 1940, Mercury used its own chassis and body.

The Monterey was offered in five bodystyles, including two and four-door pillared sedans, a two-door convertible, and two-door and four-door Cruiser hardtops. Taking its name from the discontinued Turnpike Cruiser, the Cruiser was given a large compound-curved rear window (styled as a fastback). To improve interior access and driver visibility, the forward-swept A-pillar was made nearly vertical.

Initially designed for potential production as both an Edsel and a Mercury, the Monterey inherited several design features from the division. The dashboard grouped all instruments and controls centrally around the steering wheel, with thermostat-style climate control (air conditioning was optional), power driver seat (with memory position), and a pre-set speed warning (a precursor to cruise control) offered as options. The "Big M" badging was replaced by lettered Mercury badging across the hood; a scripted "Mercury" badge was added to the interior.

Serving as the base-trim Mercury sedan, the Monterey received a 210 hp 312 cubic-inch V8; the previous 383 cubic-inch V8 (producing 280 hp) was optional. A 3-speed manual was standard on the 312; a 3-speed automatic was offered as an option (the only transmission offered on the 383).

For 1960, the Monterey underwent a facelift; along with visually reducing exterior trim (and tailfins), the update shifted its appearance closer in line to the newly introduced Mercury Comet compact sedan and the shared Ford Galaxie platform. The headlights were now integrated into the grille, which was expanded upwards and no longer used the headlight pod appearance which had become dated.

== 1961–1964 ==
Fifth generation
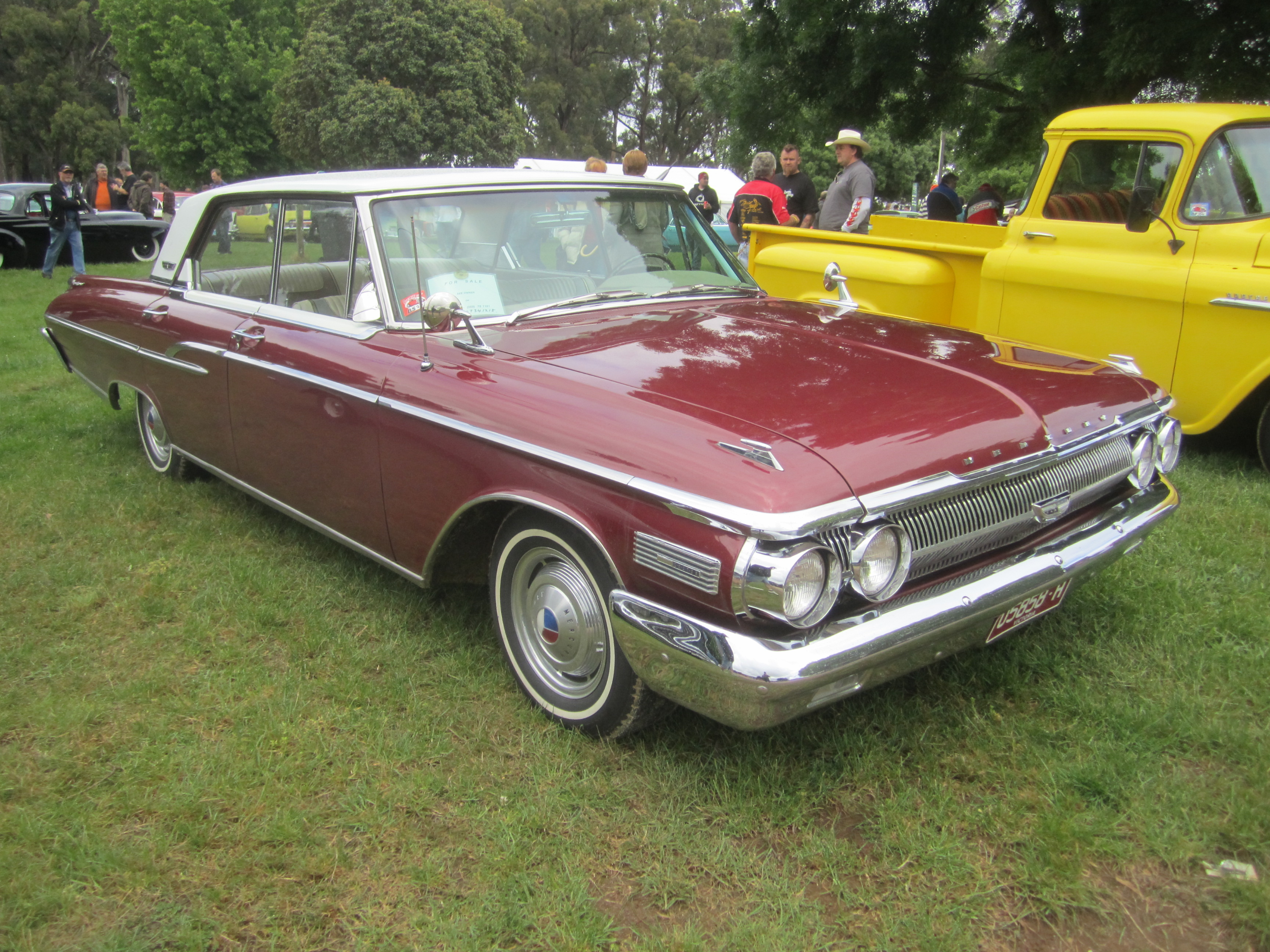
- 1962 Mercury Monterey Custom 4-Door Hardtop

Overview
- Model years: 1961–1964

Body and chassis
- Body style: 4-door sedan 4-door hardtop 2-door hardtop 2-door convertible 4-door station wagon
- Related: Mercury Meteor; Mercury Colony Park; Mercury Commuter; Mercury Marauder; Ford Galaxie; Ford Country Squire

Powertrain
- Engine: 223 cu in (3.7 L) Mileage Maker I6; 292 cu in (4.8 L) Ford Y-block V8; 352 cu in (5.8 L) FE V8; 390 cu in (6.4 L) FE V8; 406 cu in (6.7 L) FE V8
- Transmission: 3-speed manual 4-speed manual 3-speed Merc-O-Matic automatic

Dimensions
- Wheelbase: 120.0 in (3,050 mm)
- Length: 214.6 in (5,450 mm)
- Width: 79.9 in (2,030 mm)
- Height: 55.0 in (1,400 mm)

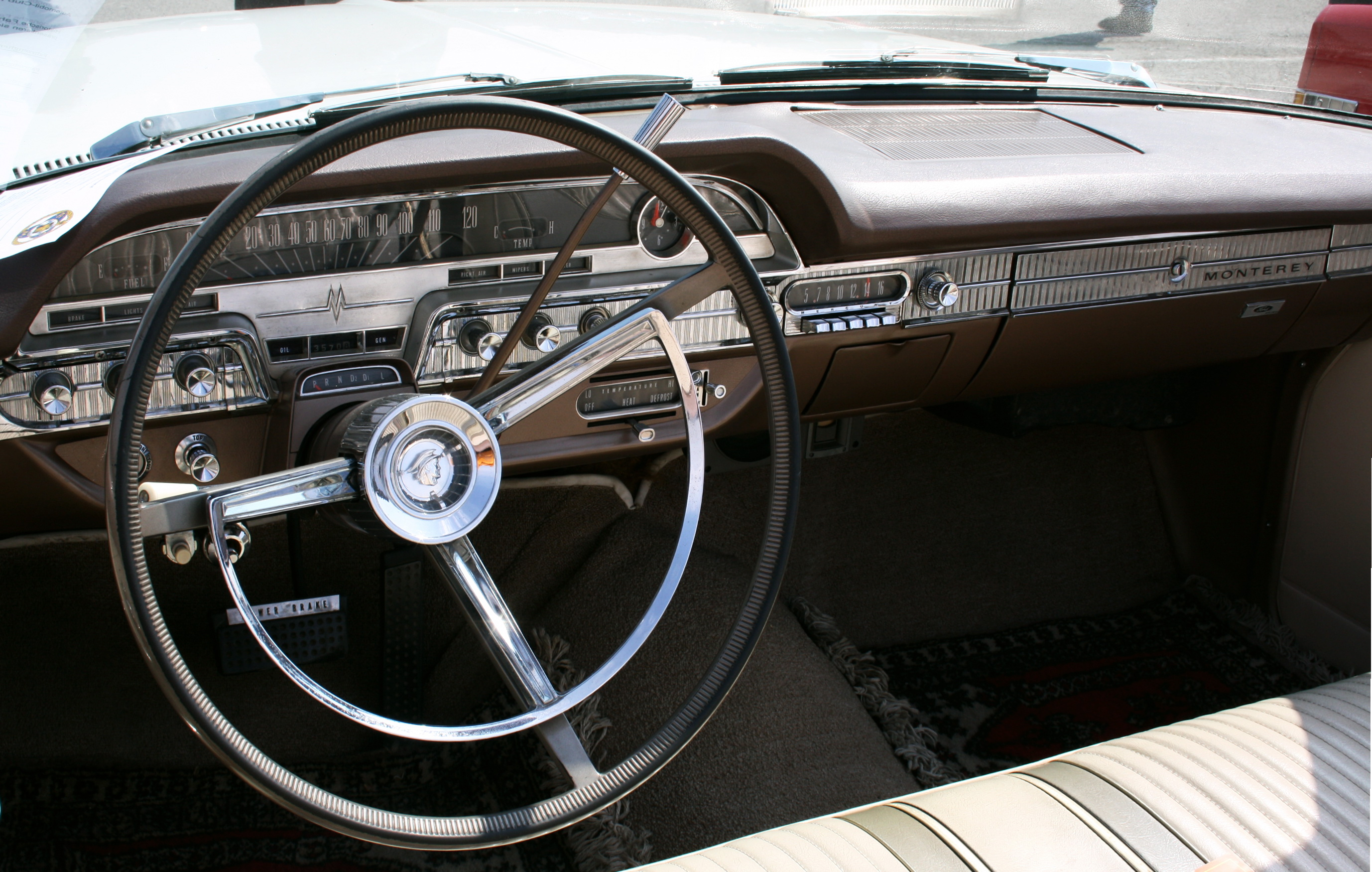
1962 Mercury Monterey convertible interior

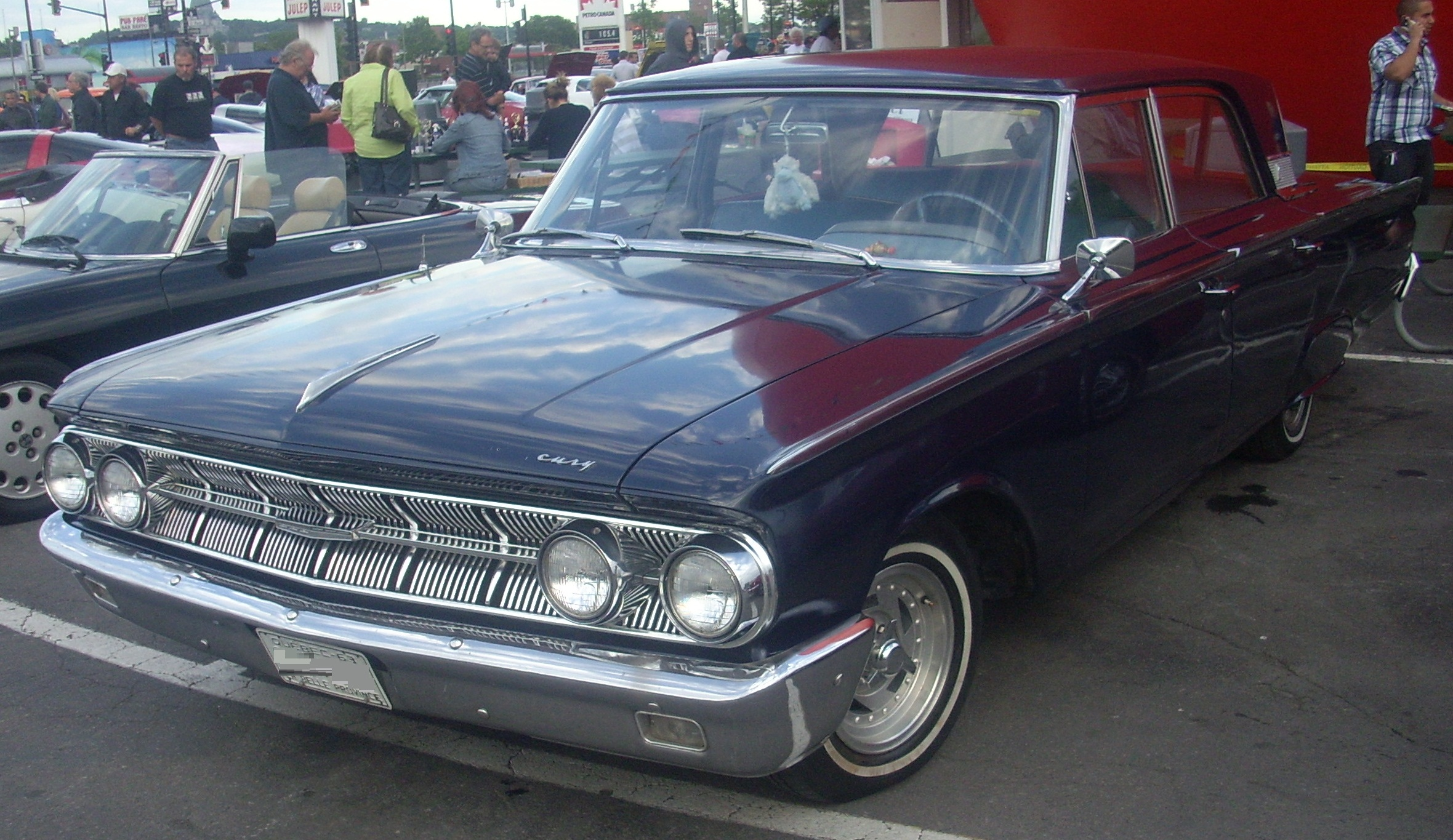
1963 Mercury Monterey

For 1961, Mercury underwent a major transformation of its model line. In a transition from 1957 to 1960, Mercury again shared a bodyshell with a divisional counterpart, shifting from Edsel to Ford, with the Monterey becoming the equivalent of the Ford Galaxie. The Montclair and Park Lane were discontinued, shifting the Monterey from the base-trim Mercury sedan to its flagship, slotted above the newly introduced Mercury Meteor (as with the Comet, intended as an Edsel before the discontinuation of the division). One of the first examples of downsizing, by adopting a common chassis and body with Ford, the Monterey lost six inches of wheelbase, nearly two inches of width, and over 4 inches of length; dependent on powertrain, the 1961 Monterey shed over 300 pounds of curb weight. At 120 inches, the Monterey was given a 1-inch longer wheelbase than the Galaxie.

The Monterey was offered in four bodystyles, including two and four-door hardtops, a four-door sedan, and a two-door convertible. Sharing its roofline with the Galaxie (except for the Starliner fastback), the Monterey differed primarily by its grille; in place of two large taillamps, Mercury used six small taillamps. While slightly more adorned than its Galaxie counterpart, the Monterey continued to adopt more subdued styling, shifting chrome trim nearly entirely to the front and rear fascias and the roofline.

Shared with the Ford Galaxie, the Monterey again received the 292 cubic-inch Y-block V8 (175 hp), with the option of 352 and 390 cubic-inch FE V8s (220 hp and 300/330 hp, respectively). As before, 3-speed manual and 3-speed automatics were offered, with a 4-speed manual becoming an option.

For 1962, the Monterey served as the entire full-size Mercury line, as Mercury shifted the Meteor nameplate to its all-new intermediate sedan range. The six-cylinder Monterey 6 was introduced, inheriting a 135 hp 223 cubic-inch Mileage Maker inline-6 from the Meteor. To better distinguish the Monterey, stylists added a convex grille (opposed to the flat grille used by Ford); the taillamps were added to the end of the tailfins (further reducing them in size). Intended as the Mercury counterpart of the Ford Galaxie 500XL, the Mercury S-55 was introduced as an option for two-door Monterey hardtops and convertibles, offering front bucket seats, floor-mounted shifters, and special trim. While offered with any Monterey engine, the S-55 option also offered a 405 hp 406 cubic-inch V8.

For 1963, the Monterey underwent a substantial revision to its roofline, reintroducing the retractable rear window used by the 1958-1960 Continental model line and the Mercury Turnpike Cruiser. While again using the reverse-slant design, the power-window mechanism was borrowed from the station wagon line. Named "Breezeway", the retractable rear window was standard on all non-convertible Montereys and S-55s. The front grille adopted a sharply-divided concave design, with the six-lens taillamp rear fascia making a return. As a 1963 1/2 vehicle, Mercury introduced the Mercury Marauder as a trim package for the Monterey; to better compete in racing, Mercury mated the body of the Monterey with the roofline of the Ford Galaxie hardtop. While technically a Monterey trim package, the Marauder option could be combined with the S-55 trim. The powertrain line underwent a similar revision, as the 223 six and 292 and 352 V8s were dropped, with a 250 hp 390 becoming the standard engine; a 300 hp 390 was offered, along with 385 hp and 405 hp versions of the 406 V8. As a running change during 1963, the 406 was replaced by a 427 cubic-inch V8, in 410 hp and 425 hp outputs (the latter offered only through special order).

For 1964, Mercury revised its sedan offerings; while the S-55 was discontinued, the Montclair and Park Lane made their return. In another change, the Marauder fastback was introduced as a four-door hardtop (giving Mercury a second roofline distinct from Ford); while performance-oriented, all three Mercury sedans offered the Marauder roofline as an option. In line with the Ford Thunderbird, the entire front fascia became more convex, with a more closely-fitting front bumper. Coinciding with the Montclair and Park Lane, the Monterey was reintroduced as a two-door sedan; the four-door hardtop was only offered as a Marauder fastback.

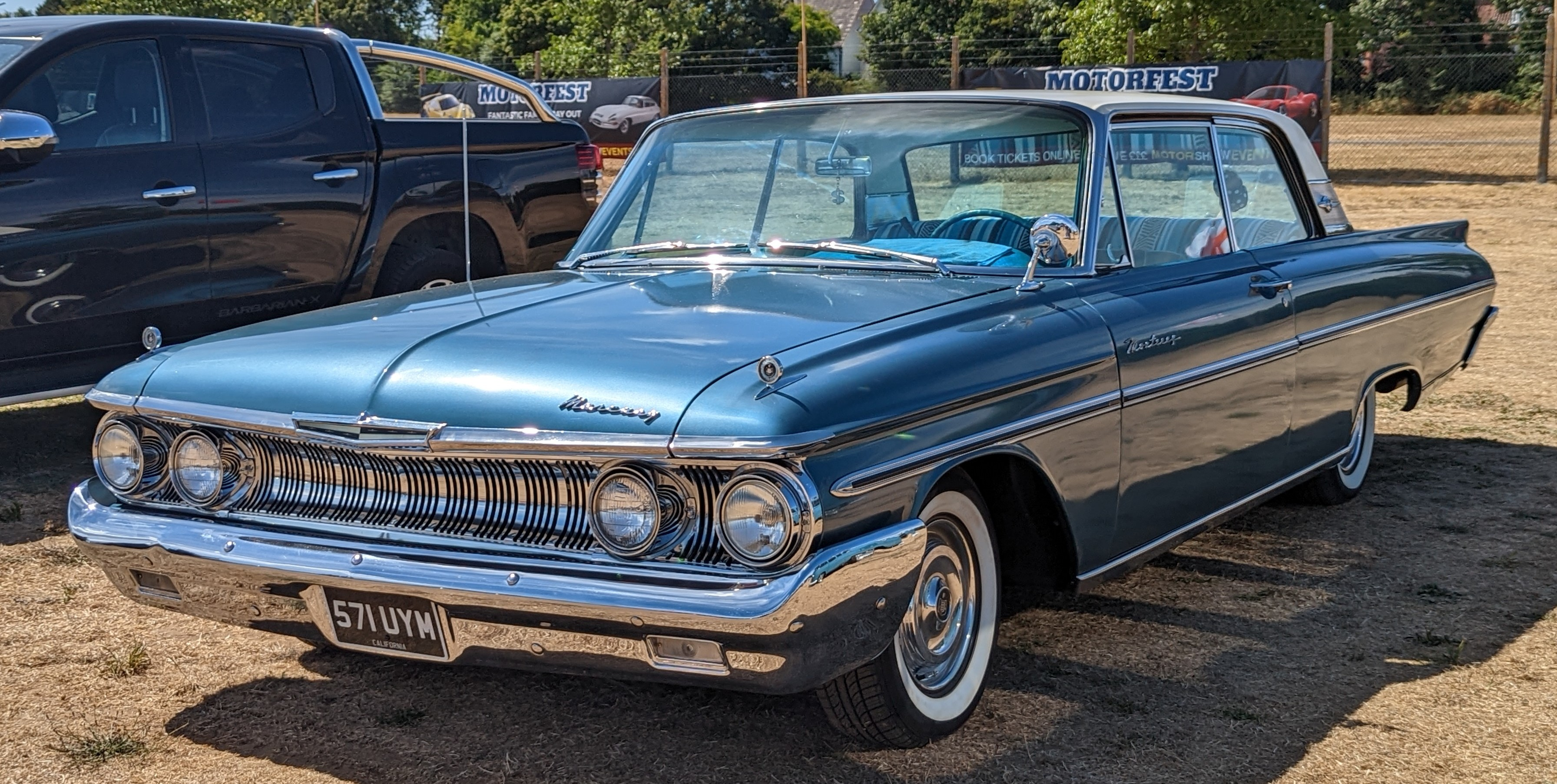
1961 Mercury Monterey 2-Door Hardtop

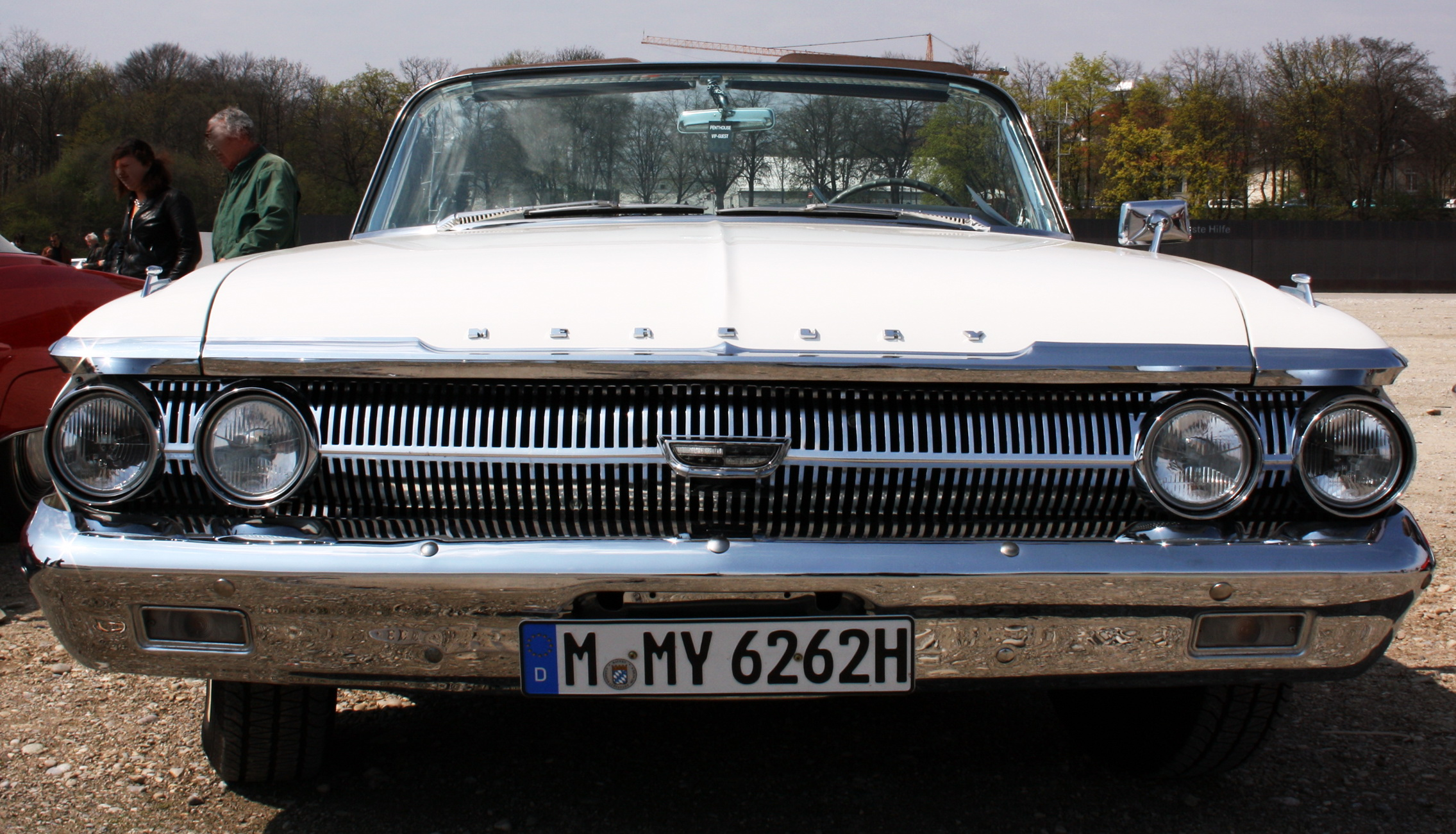
1962 Mercury Monterey convertible

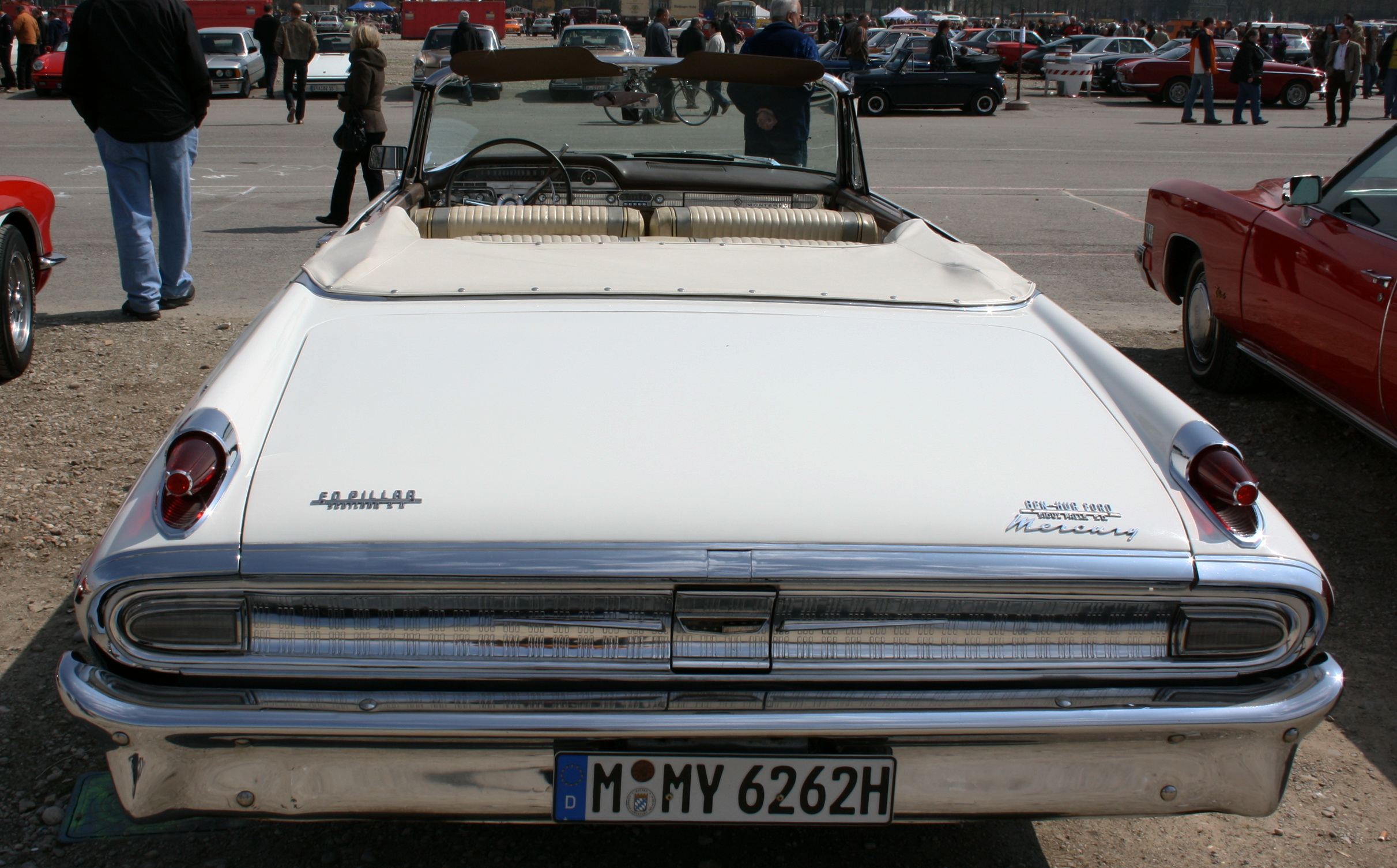
1962 Mercury Monterey convertible rear

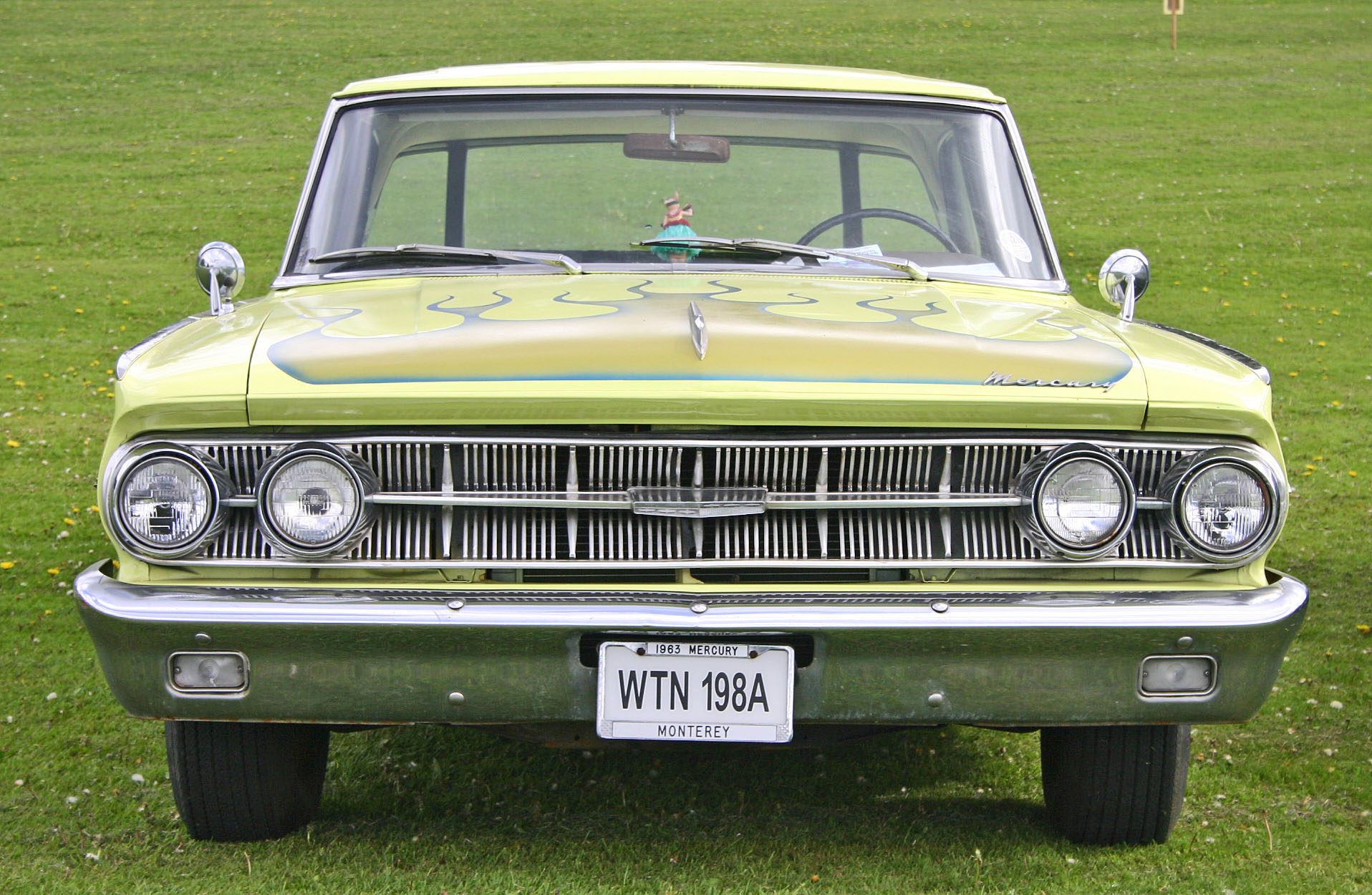
1963 Monterey

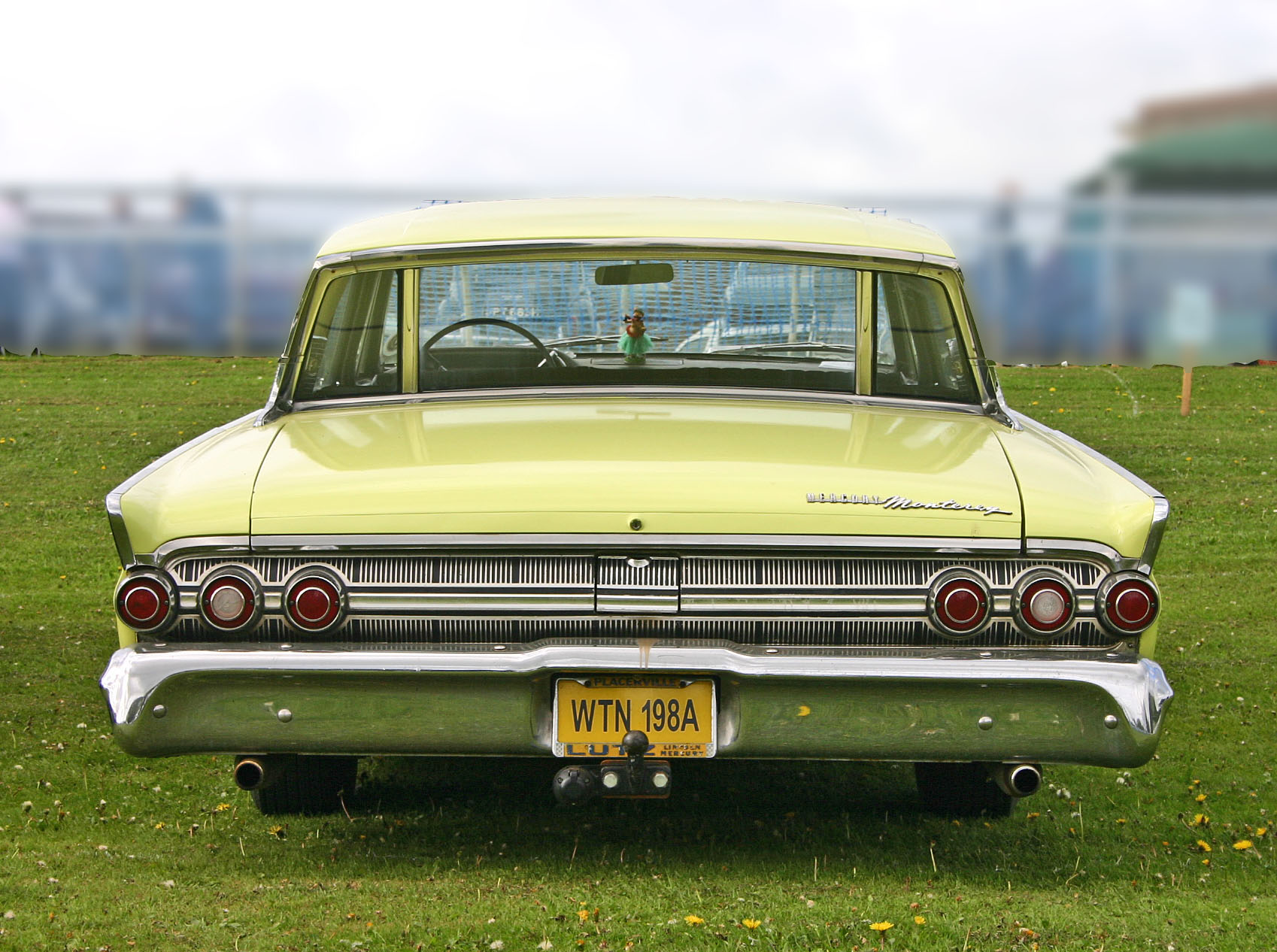
Rear "Breezeway" window

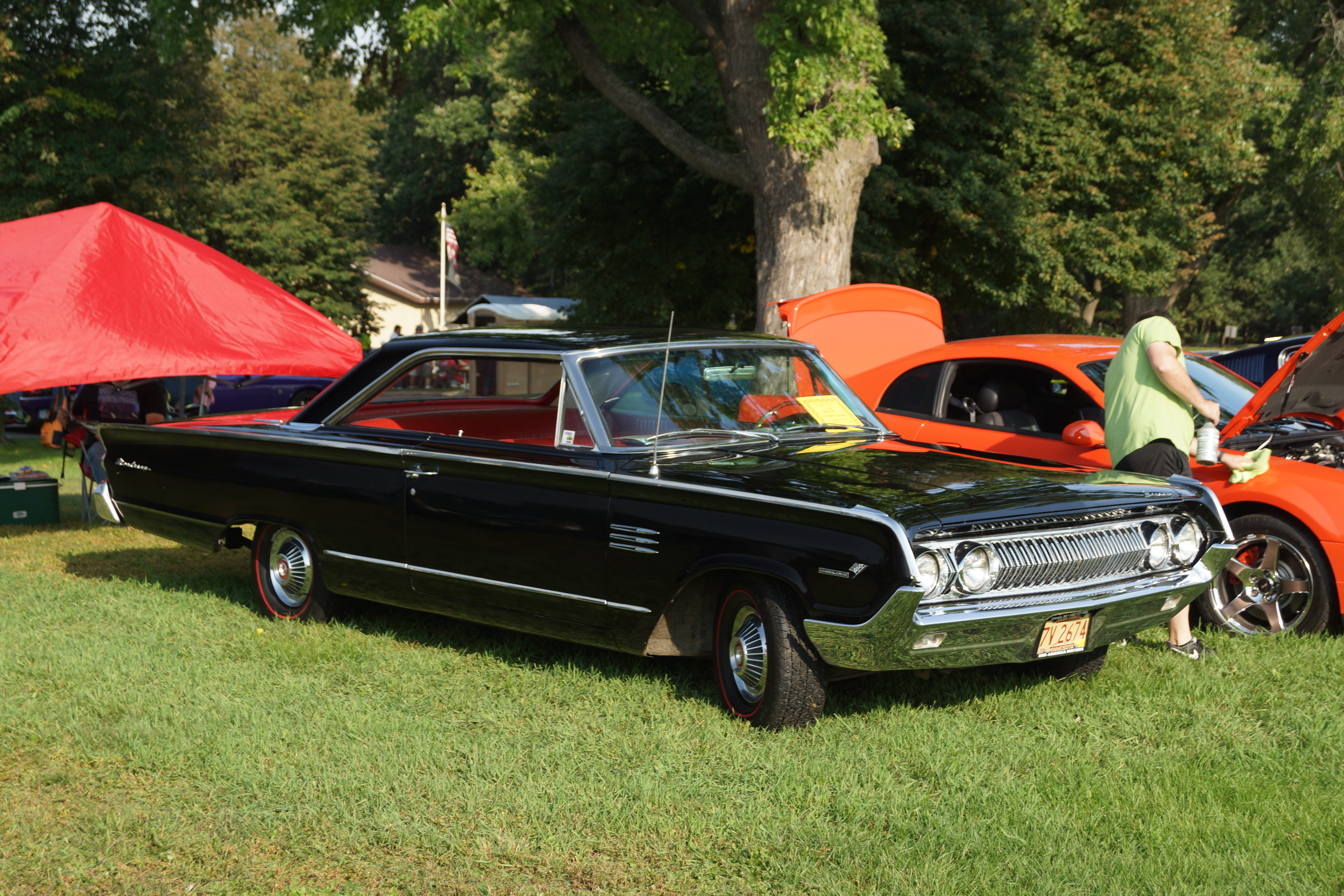
1964 Mercury Monterey two-door Marauder Hardtop

== 1965–1968 ==
Sixth generation
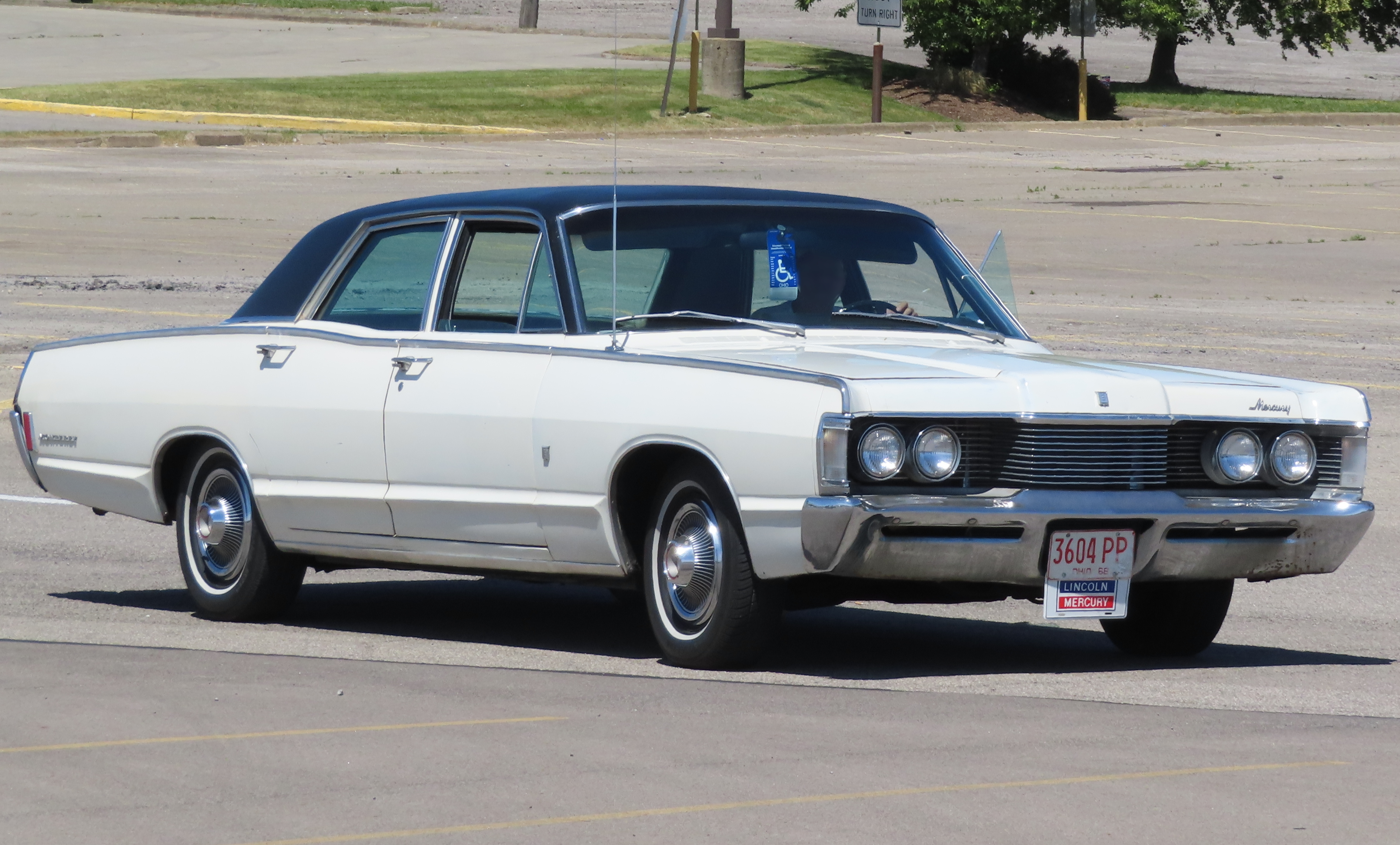
- 1968 Mercury Monterey 4-door sedan

Overview
- Model years: 1965–1968

Body and chassis
- Body style: 4-door sedan 4-door hardtop 2-door hardtop 2-door convertible 4-door station wagon
- Related: Mercury Park Lane; Mercury Montclair; Mercury Marauder; Mercury Commuter; Ford Galaxie

Powertrain
- Engine: 390 cu in (6.4 L) FE V8; 410 cu in (6.7 L) FE V8; 427 cu in (7.0 L) FE V8; 428 cu in (7.0 L) FE V8
- Transmission: 3-speed manual 4-speed manual 3-speed Merc-O-Matic automatic 3-speed C6 automatic

Dimensions
- Wheelbase: 123.0 in (3,120 mm)

For the 1965 year, Mercury redesigned its full-size line, with the Monterey again serving its base-trim sedan. Growing in size to a 123-inch wheelbase (4 inches longer than Ford), the Monterey adopted an all-new chassis and redesigned rear suspension, abandoning leaf springs for a coil-sprung live rear-axle.

While again derived directly from the Ford Galaxie, the exterior of Mercury sedans adopted multiple design elements from the popular Lincoln Continental, branding the entire Mercury model line designed "in the Lincoln Continental tradition". In place of the vertically stacked headlights of Ford, the Monterey adopted four horizontal headlamps; the grille was styled similar to the Continental, adopting straight-lined front fenders. The rear fascia was also styled similar to the Continental (adding two taillamp lenses to the bumper); all vestiges of the tailfins were removed. The Monterey was now offered in six body styles, offering two-door and four-door sedans, a four-door sedan with a "Breezeway" rear window, two-door and four-door hardtops, and a two-door convertible. The Breezeway roof was now limited to 4-door sedans; as an alternative, hardtops were fitted with passive "flow-through" ventilation. In 1965 the Mercury Commuter station wagon returned to the Monterey line as a lower priced alternative to the Colony Park station wagon that was now part of the Park Lane model line.

The powertrain was carried over from 1964; a 250 hp 390 V8 was standard, with optional 300 hp "Super" and 330 hp "Interceptor" versions. A 425 hp 427 V8 was also offered as an option.

For 1966, the Monterey underwent some minor styling revisions. The taillights were redesigned (removing the lower lenses from the bumper), adding chrome trim bands; the side front fender vents were redesigned. Two-door hardtops received a new roofline with thinner C-pillars. The engine lineup underwent multiple changes, as the 390 was increased to 265 hp (275 with automatic); the Super and Interceptor versions were dropped, replaced by a 330 hp 410 cubic-inch V8 (exclusive to Mercury). The 427 V8 (largely a racing engine) was dropped, with Mercury introducing a 345 hp 428 cubic-inch V8 as its most powerful engine option.

For 1967, the roofline of four-door sedans underwent a minor revision, adopting a more formal C-pillar profile; the reverse-slant Breezeway roof was discontinued (an optional retractable rear window remained available, using the standard roofline). For a third time, the taillamps were redesigned, spanning from the top of the fender to the bottom of the bumper. Largely overshadowed by the smaller Cougar, the S-55 became an option package for full-size Mercury two-doors.

For 1968, the front fascia underwent a minor restyle, again modeled after the Lincoln Continental; along with larger parking lamp lenses, the front fender vents were deleted. The 410 V8 was dropped, with a 280 hp version of the 390 introduced; the 428 was detuned to 340 hp.

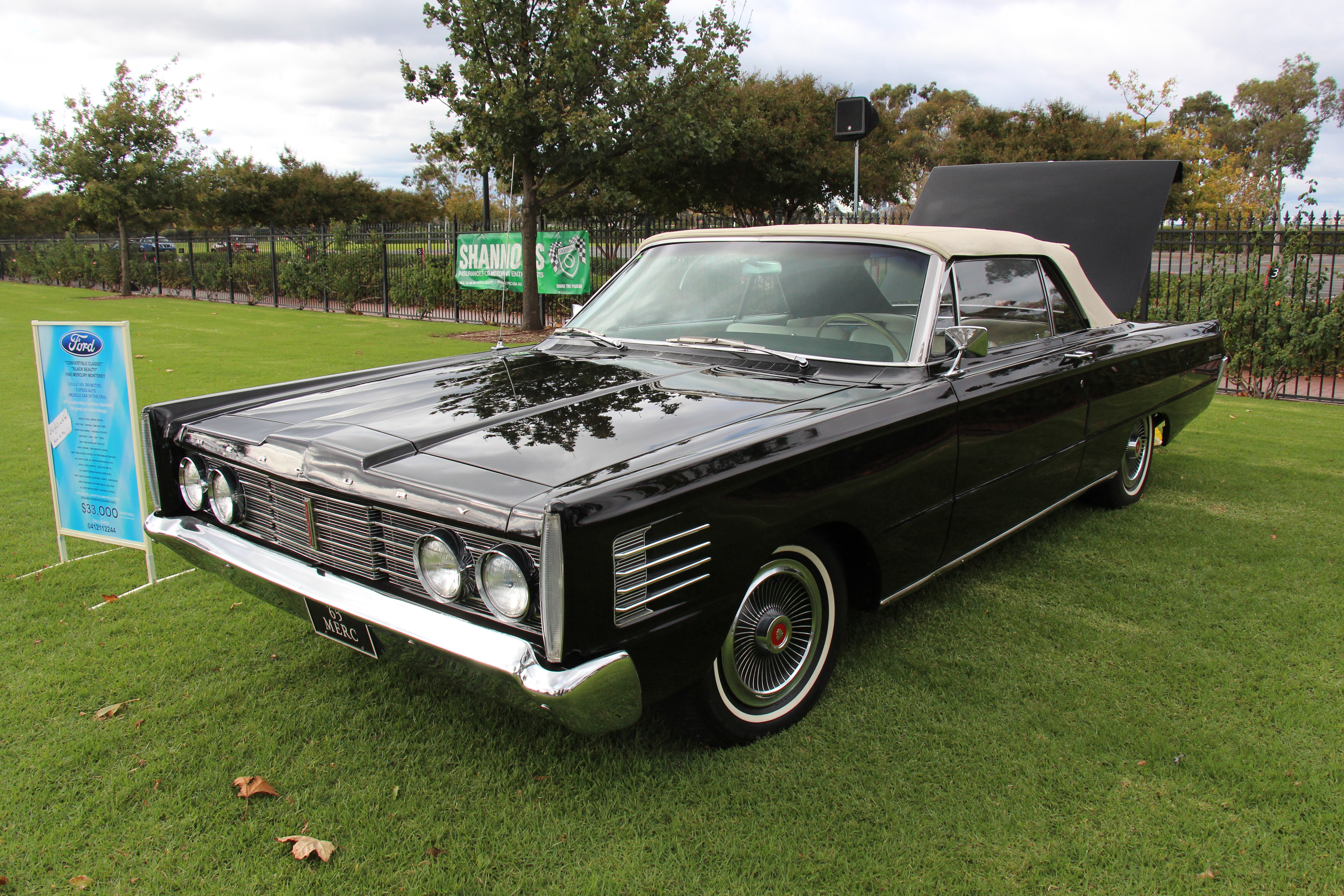
1965 Mercury Monterey Convertible

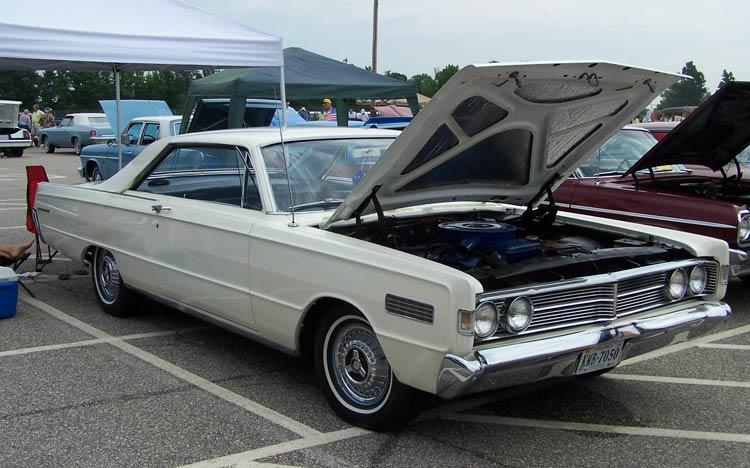
1966 Mercury Monterey 2-Door Hardtop

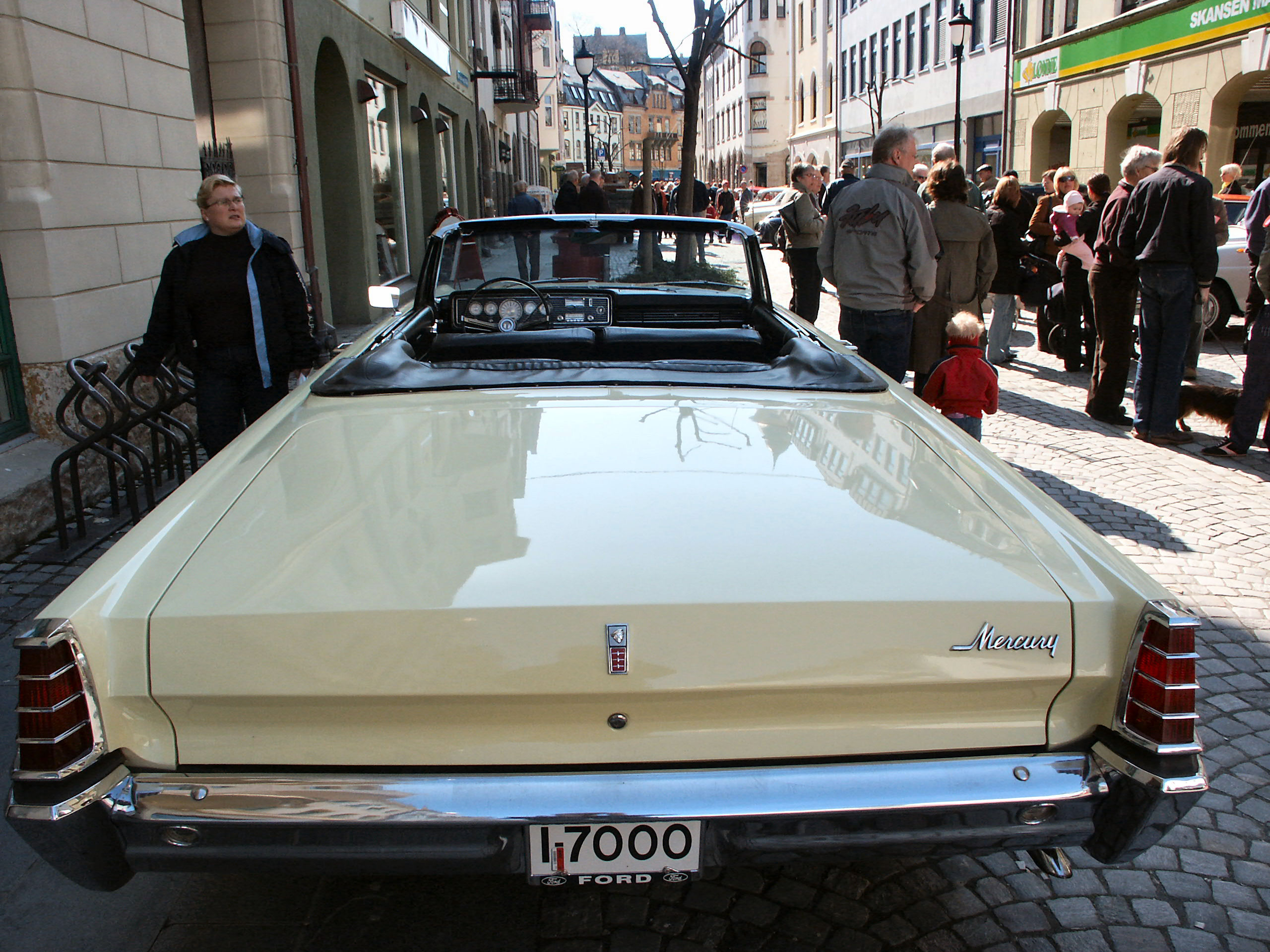
1966 Mercury Monterey Convertible

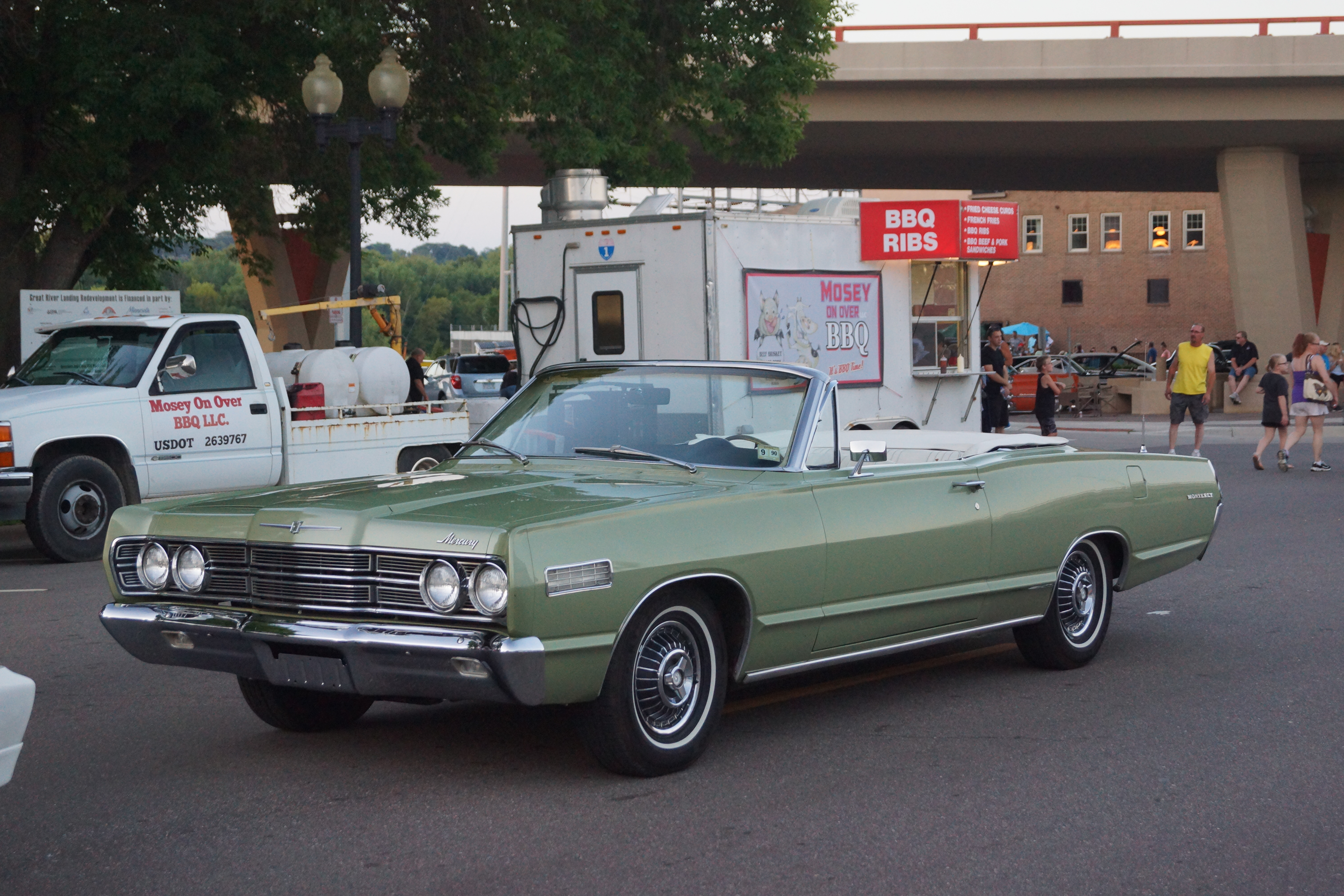
1967 Mercury Monterey Convertible

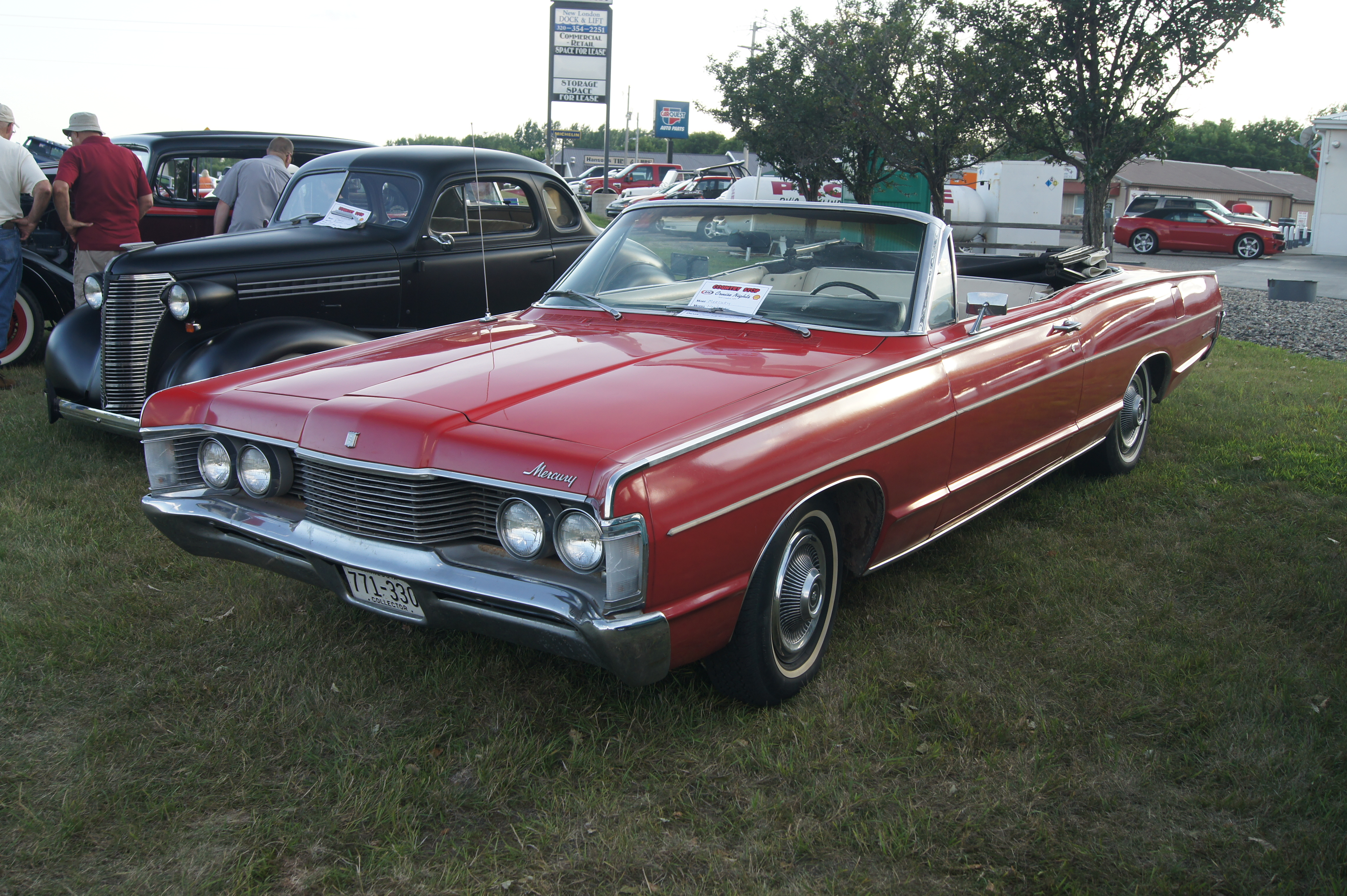
1968 Mercury Monterey Convertible

== 1969–1974 ==
Seventh generation
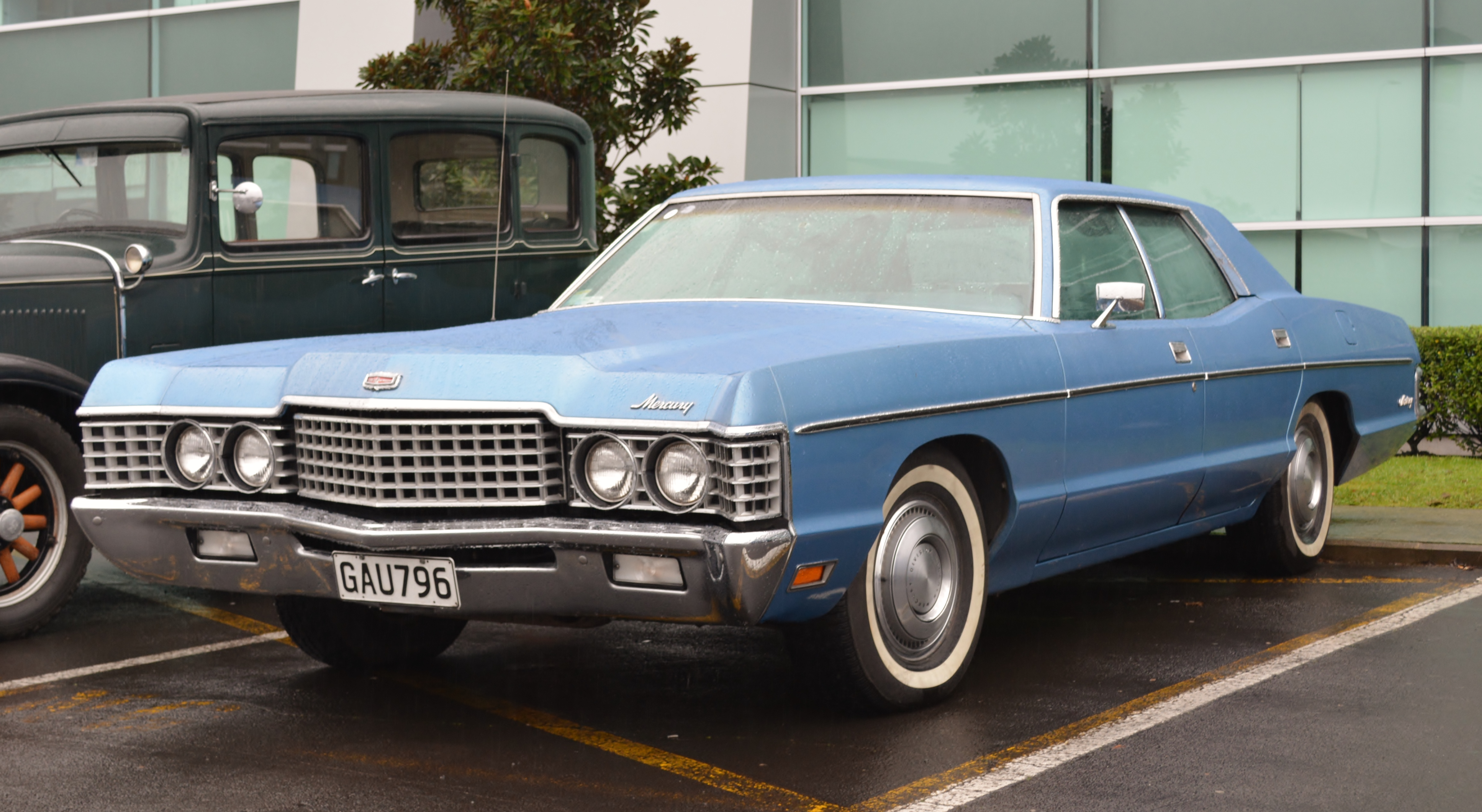
- 1972 Mercury Monterey

Overview
- Model years: 1969–1974

Body and chassis
- Body style: 4-door sedan 4-door hardtop 2-door hardtop 2-door convertible 4-door station wagon
- Related: Mercury Marquis; Mercury Colony Park; Ford LTD; Ford Galaxie; Ford Country Sedan

Powertrain
- Engine: 390 cu in (6.4 L) FE V8; 400 cu in (6.6 L) Cleveland V8; 429 cu in (7.0 L) 385-series V8; 460 cu in (7.5 L) 385-series V8
- Transmission: 3-speed manual 4-speed manual 3-speed C6 automatic

Dimensions
- Wheelbase: 124.0 in (3,150 mm)

For 1969, Mercury debuted an all-new generation of its full-size line, with sedans moving to a 124-inch wheelbase (station wagons, 121 inches). The division also made several branding changes, paring its full-size range to the Marquis (completely replacing the Park Lane, expanding to a full model range) and the Monterey (a renamed Monterey Custom replacing the Montclair); in another revision, the Monterey station wagon dropped its Commuter name (the Marquis Colony Park remained). More rounded in its exterior design than the previous generation, the Monterey and Monterey Custom were distinguished from the Marquis by their lack of hidden headlights, differing from Fords in grille and taillamp styling.

For 1970, the grille underwent a further revision and wider taillamps were introduced to better differentiate the Monterey from its Ford counterparts.

In 1971, the Mercury full-size model range underwent an exterior restyling. While retaining the roofline shared with Ford, the Monterey adopted design elements similar to the larger Lincoln Continental, included its wide-pointing grille and taillamps. In a major change, Ford and Mercury introduced "pillarless hardtops", using frameless door glass on both hardtops and four-door sedans; vent windows were discontinued. Redesigned door handles no longer protruded from the exterior; rear fender skirts were standardized on all full-size Mercury sedans except the base-trim Monterey. The Monterey and Marquis convertibles were discontinued at the end of the 1970 model year (two years before Ford's full-size convertible), leaving the Cougar as the sole Mercury convertible.

For 1972, the Monterey underwent minor exterior revisions, replacing the full-width horizontal grille for an egg-crate style design. In line with federal regulations, front seatbelt warning buzzers were introduced. For the first time, an automatic transmission was standard, along with power steering and power brakes.

For 1973, the full-size Mercury line underwent an exterior redesign, adapting to the introduction of federally mandated 5 mph bumpers. Along with slightly more angular styling, the Monterey adapted much of the front fascia of the Ford Galaxie, distinguished largely by a centered eggcrate grille, with fender skirts becoming an option. For 1974, the Monterey saw a revision to its grille and headlight trim.

For 1975, Mercury discontinued the Monterey (in line with Ford retiring the Galaxie), consolidating its full-size range down to the Marquis. The same year, the Grand Marquis sub-model was introduced as a flagship, becoming a distinct model range for 1983.

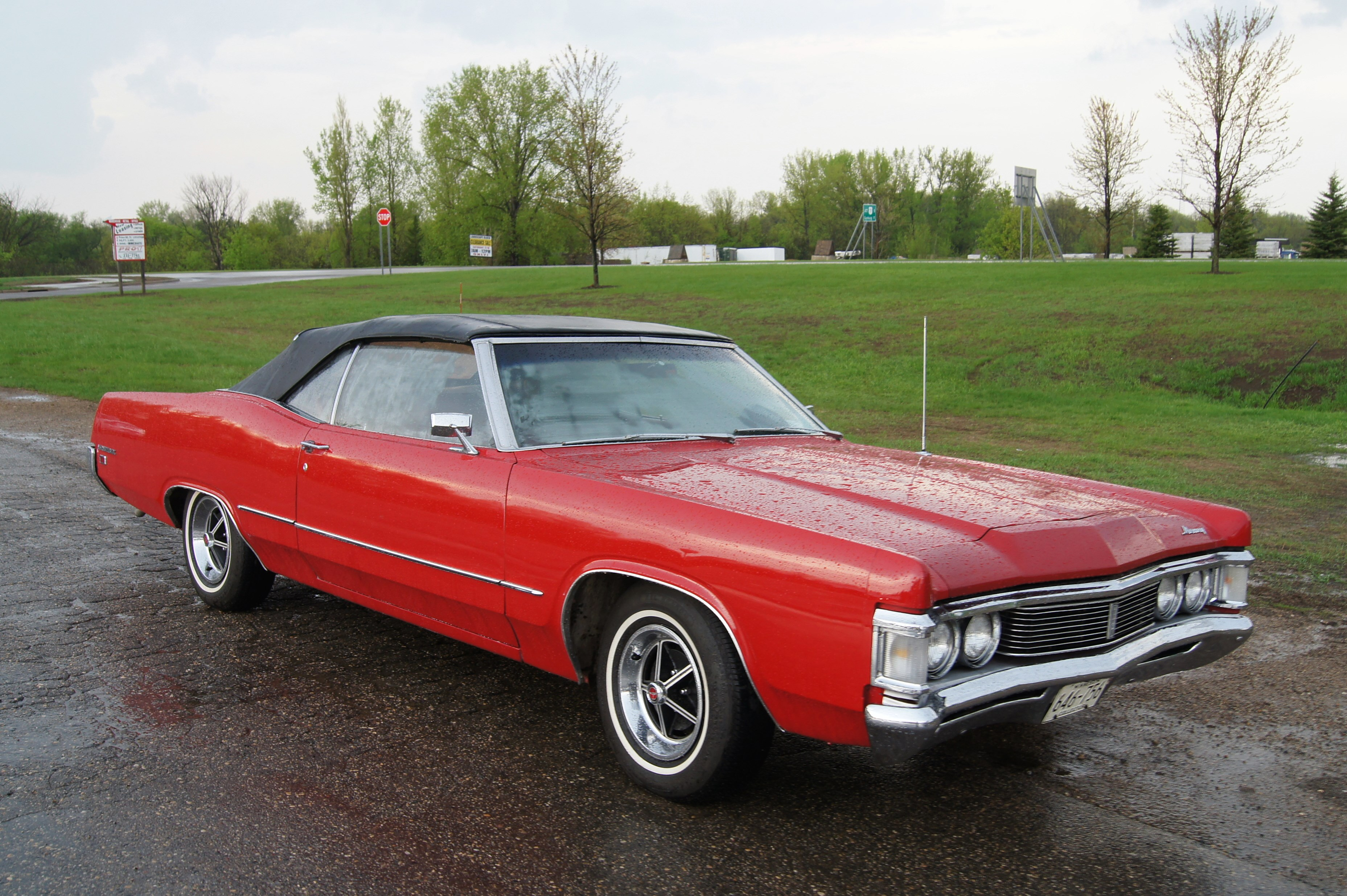
1969 Mercury Monterey convertible

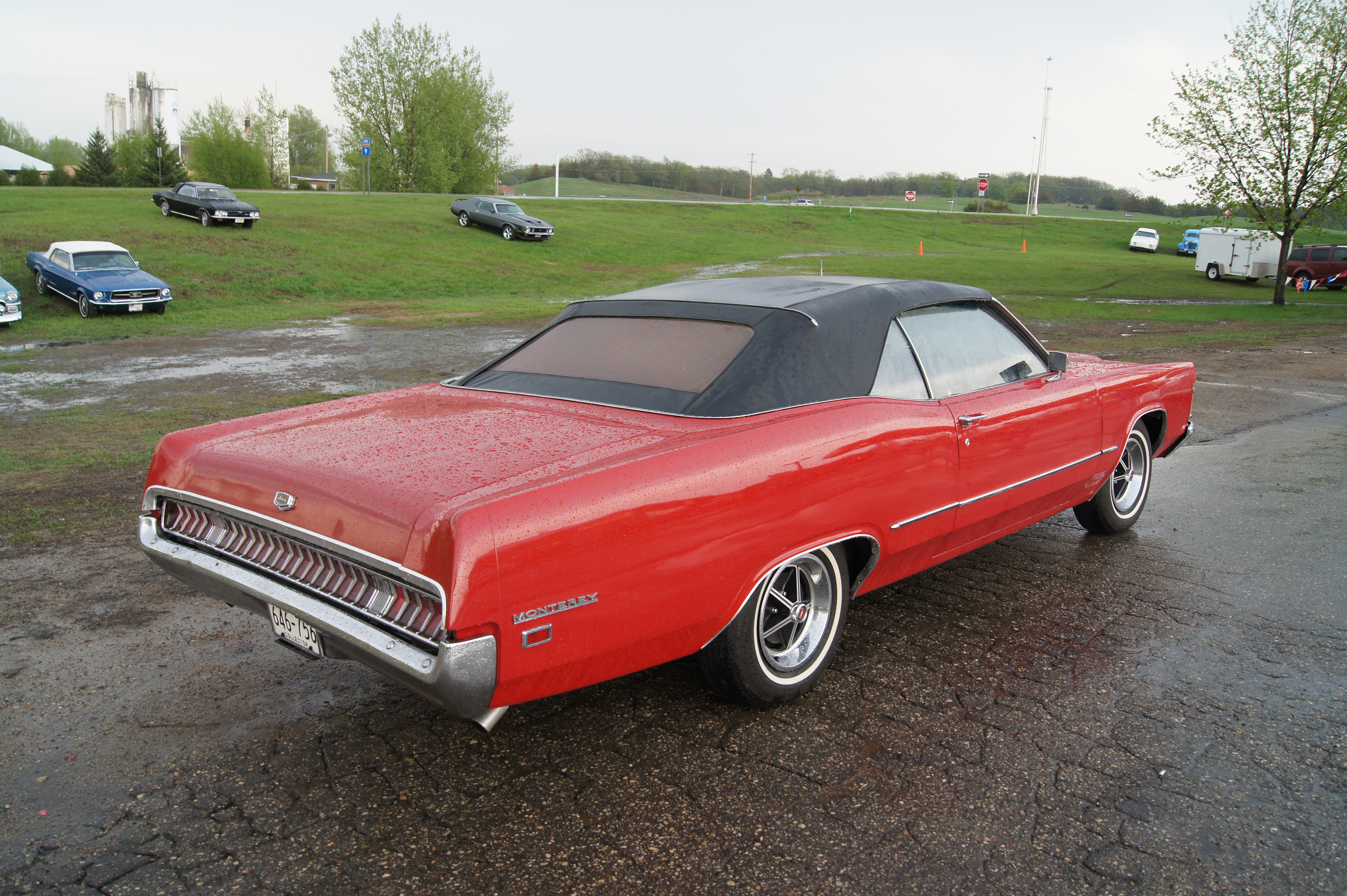
1969 Mercury Monterey convertible, rear

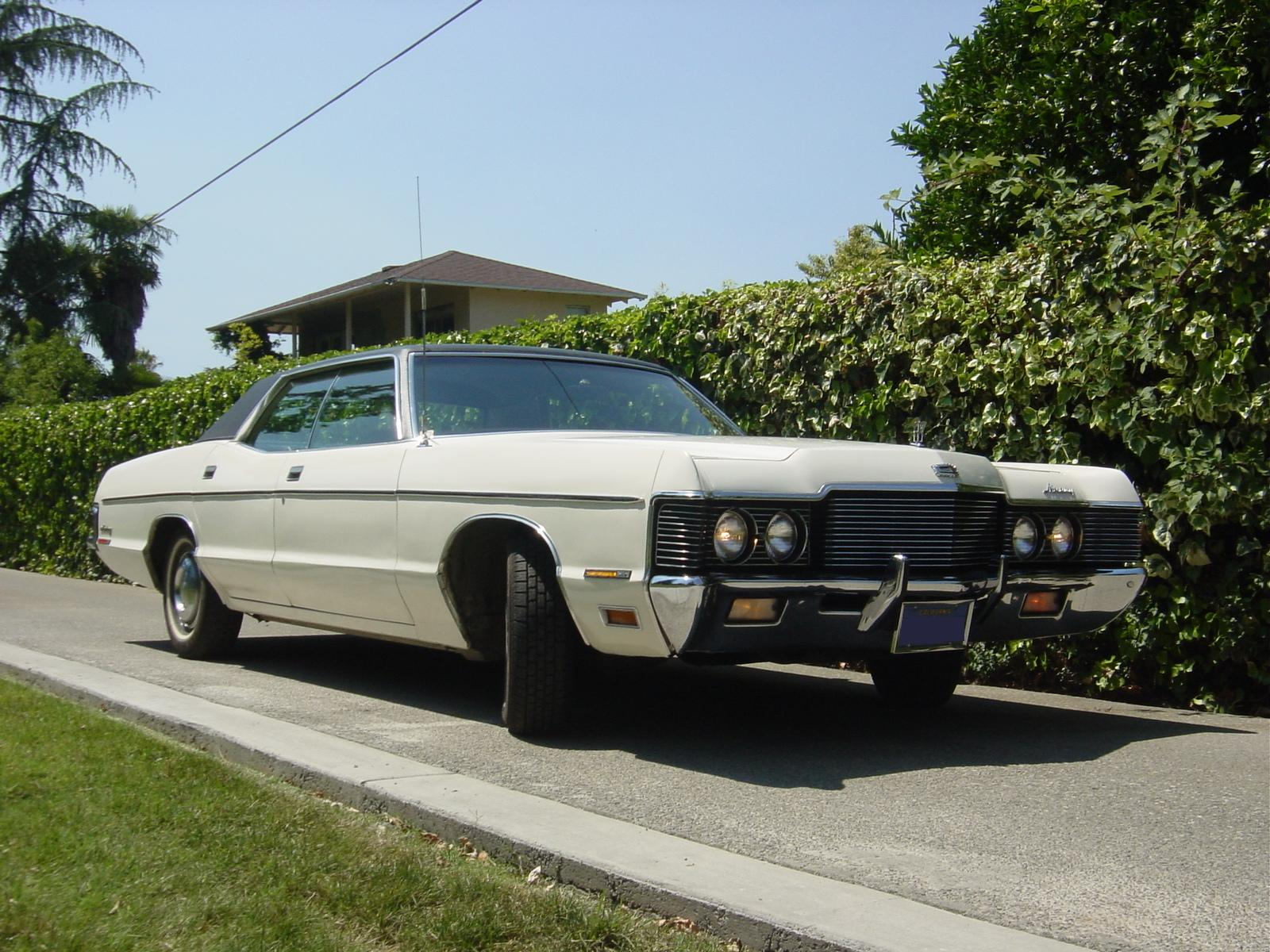
1971 Mercury Monterey four-door hardtop

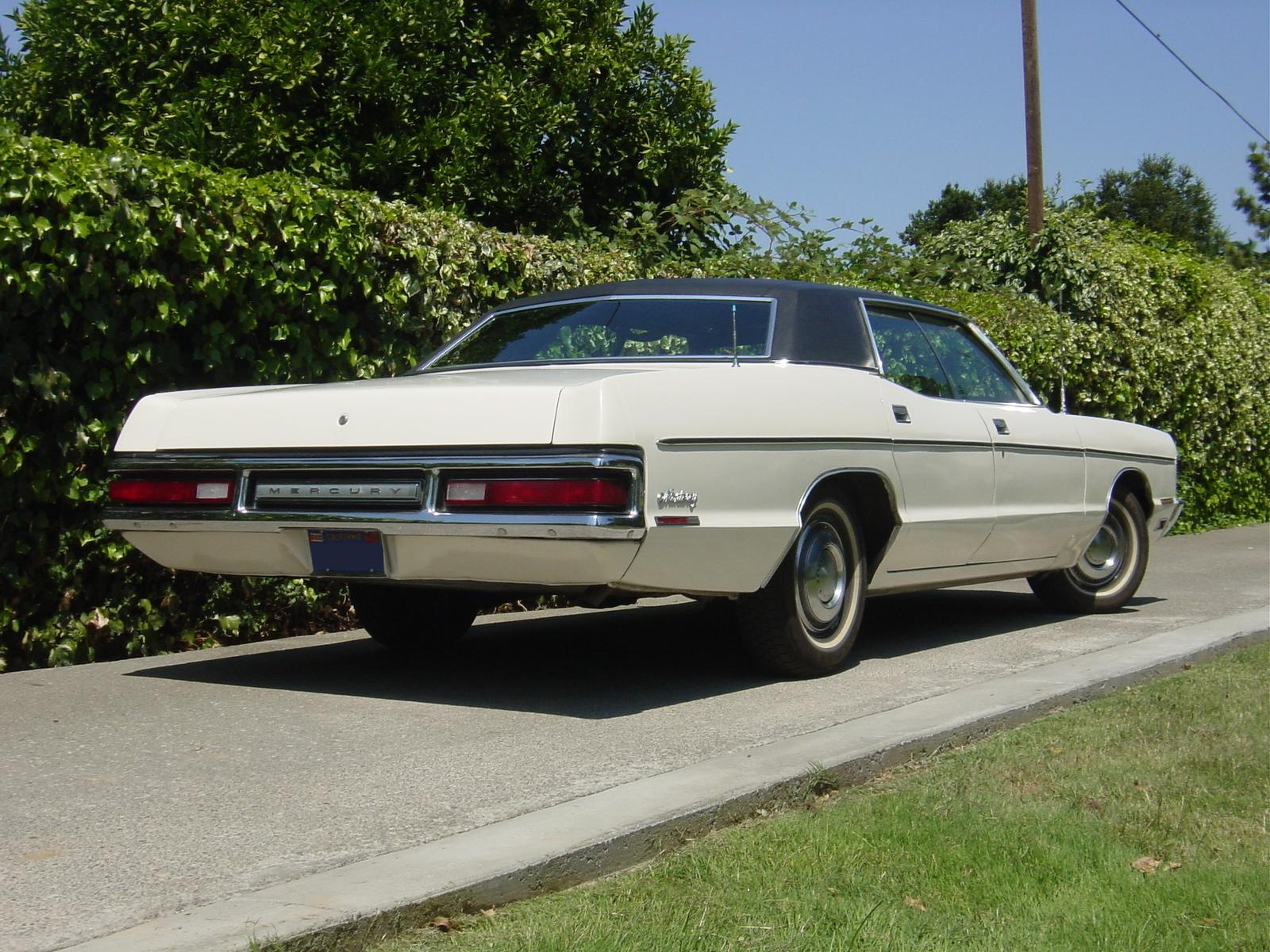
1971 Mercury Monterey four-door hardtop, rear

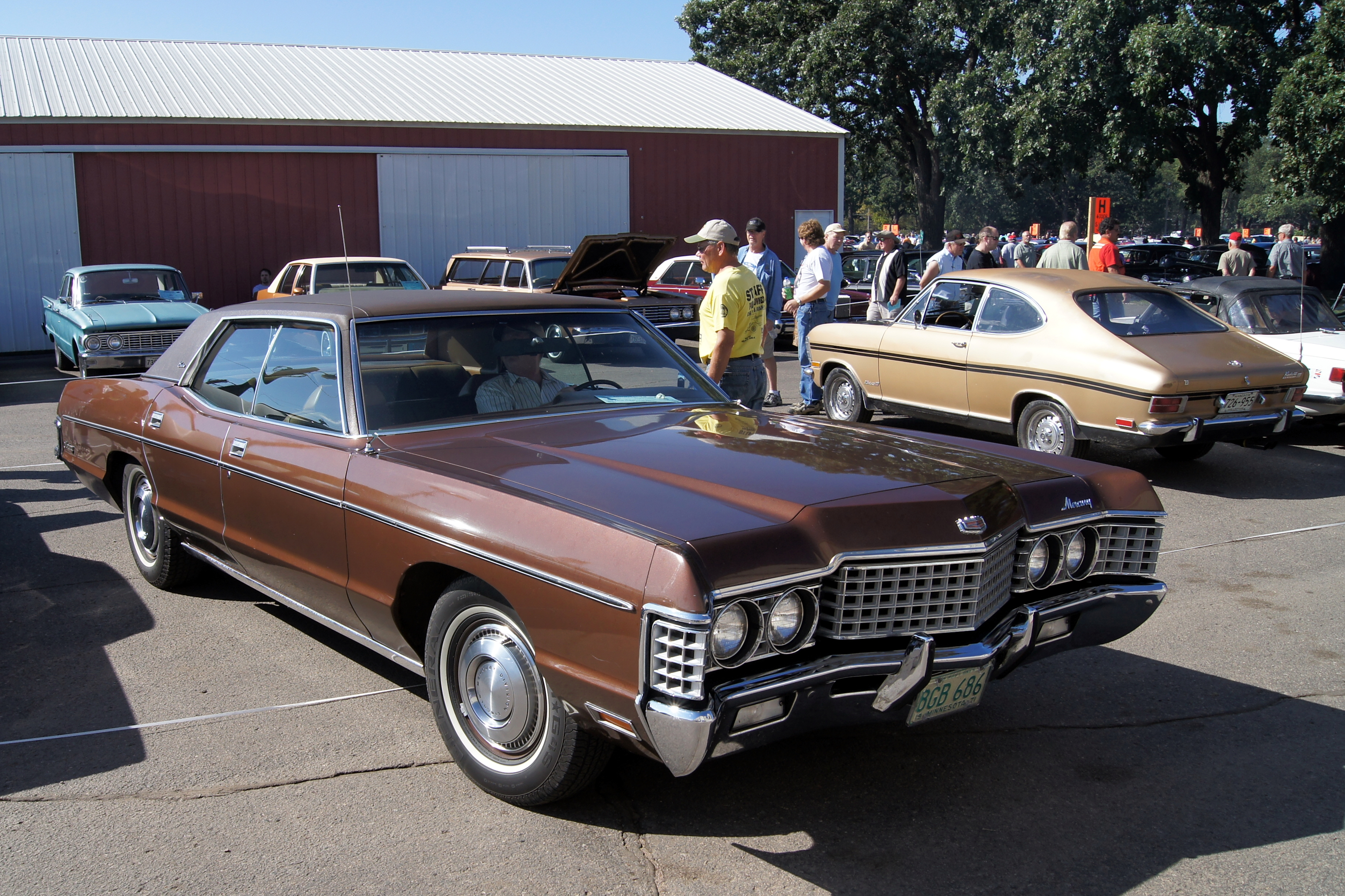
1972 Mercury Monterey Custom 4-door hardtop

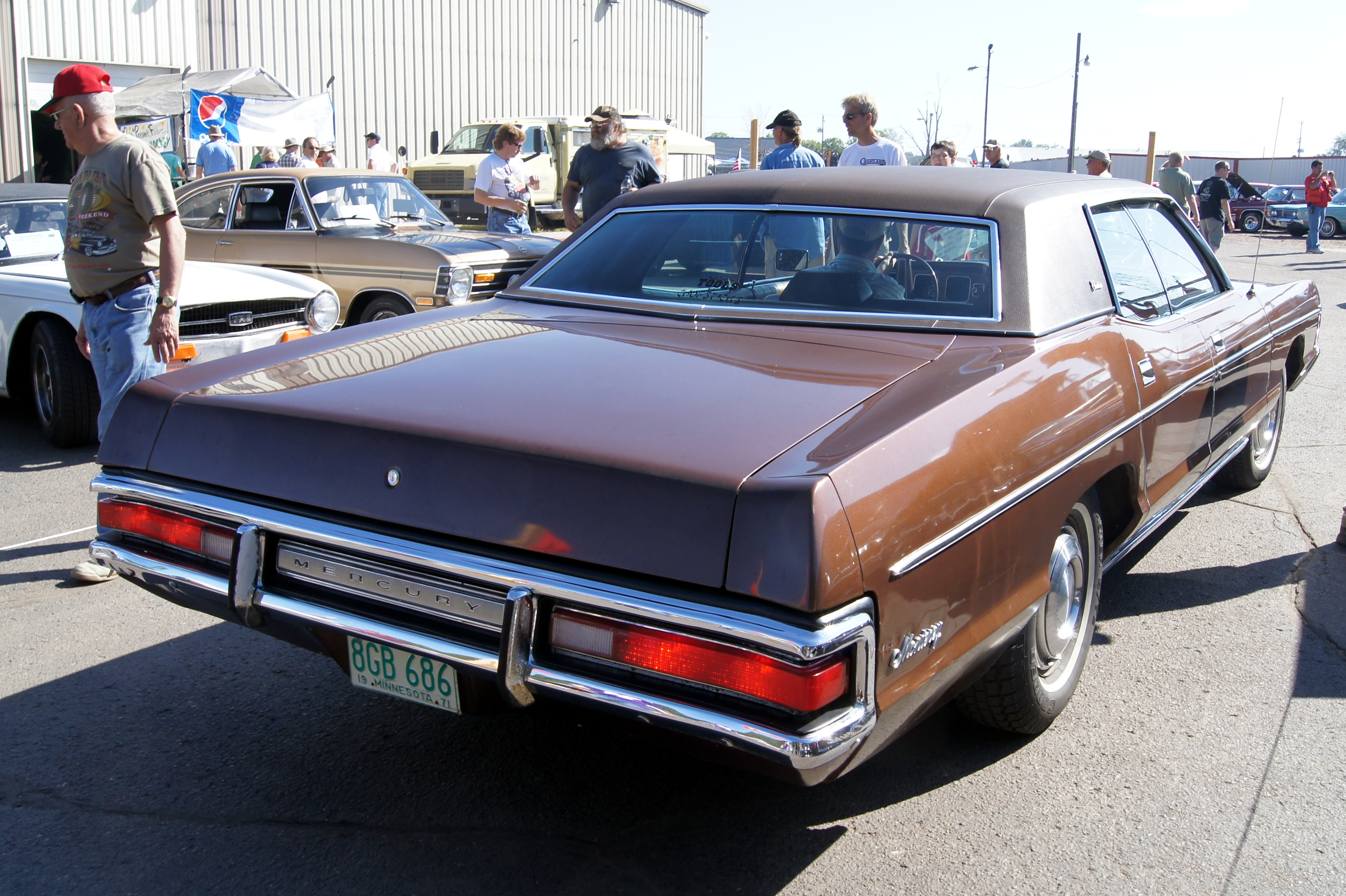
1972 Mercury Monterey Custom, rear

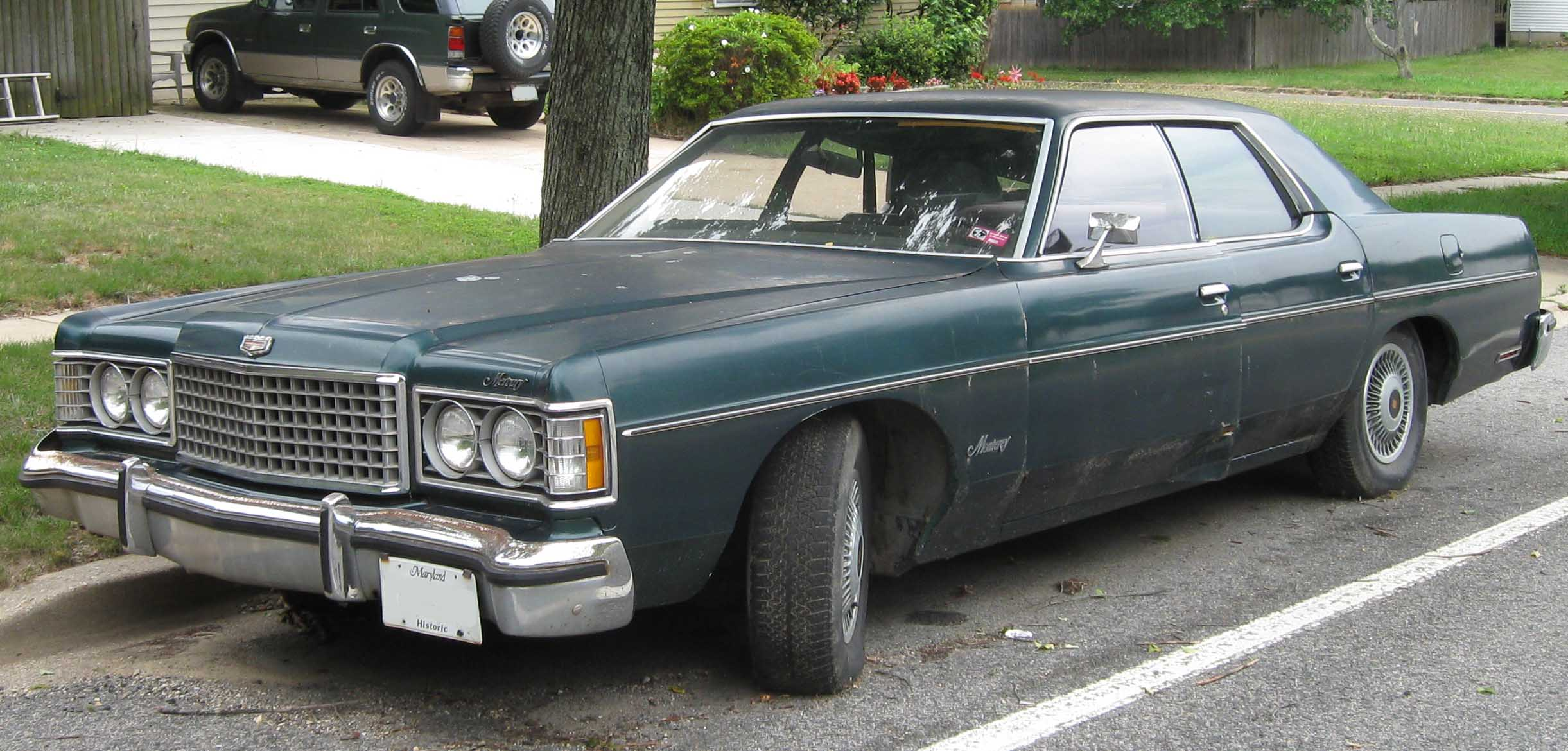
1973 Mercury Monterey

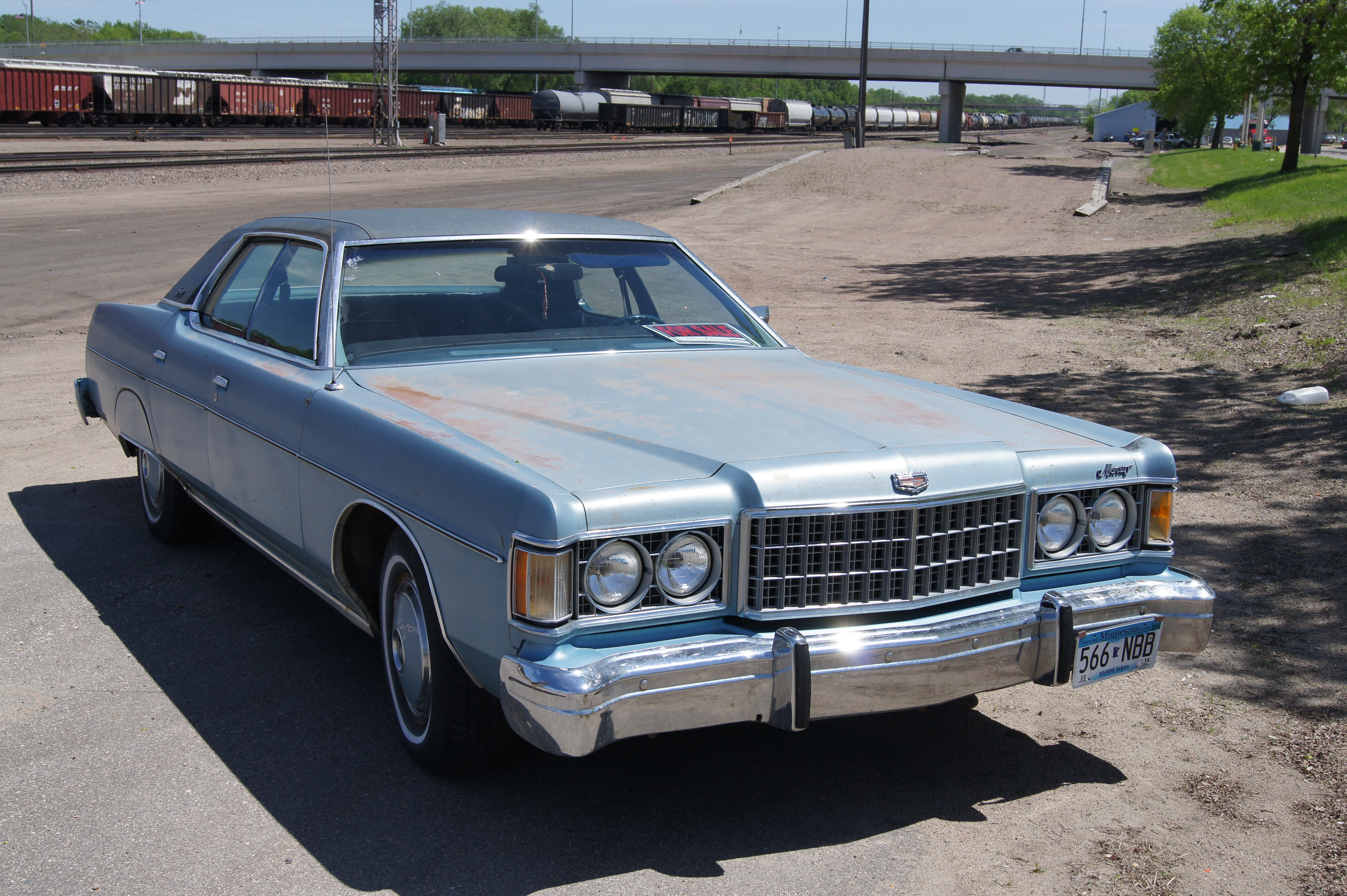
1974 Mercury Monterey

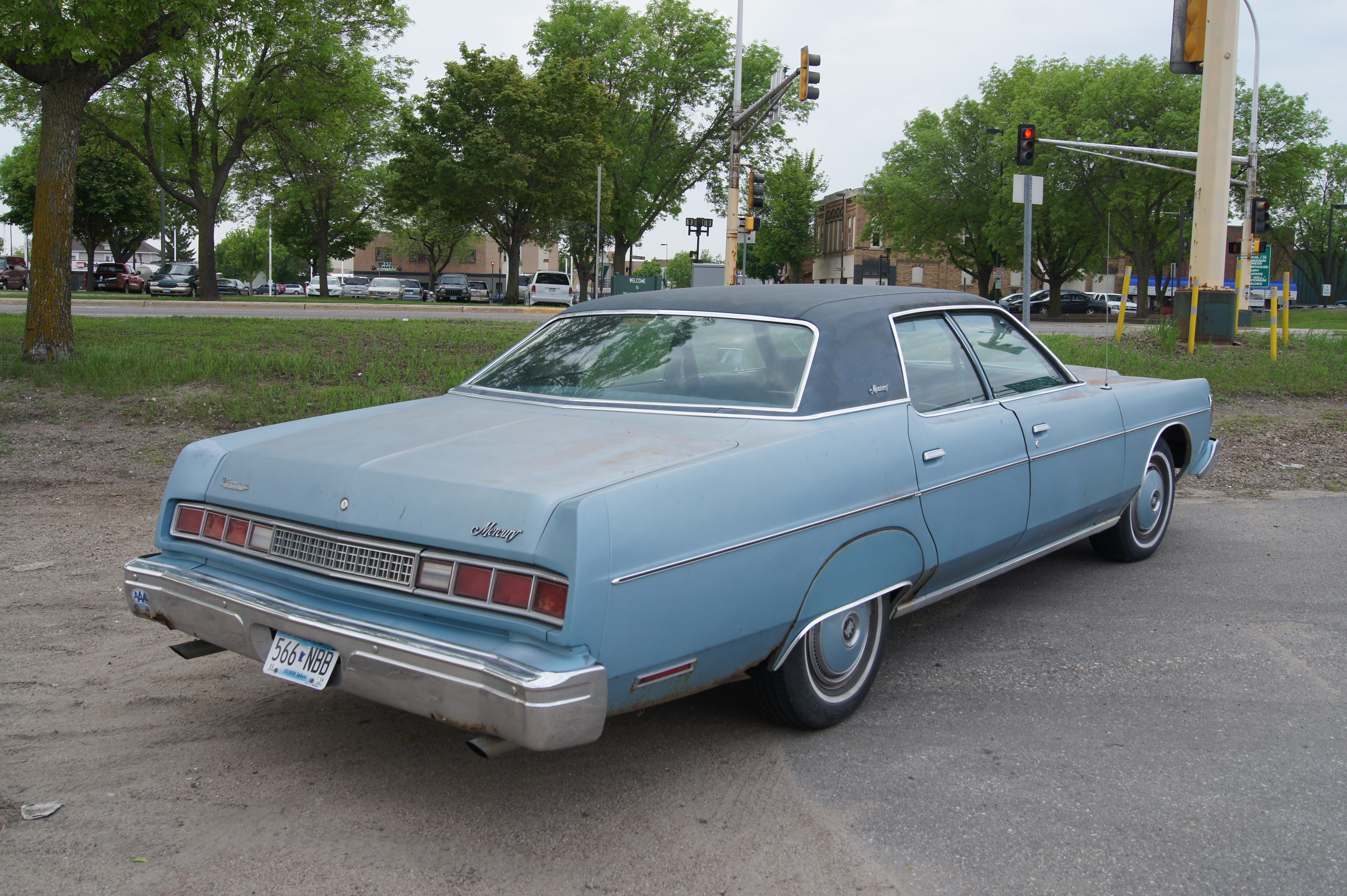
1974 Mercury Monterey, rear

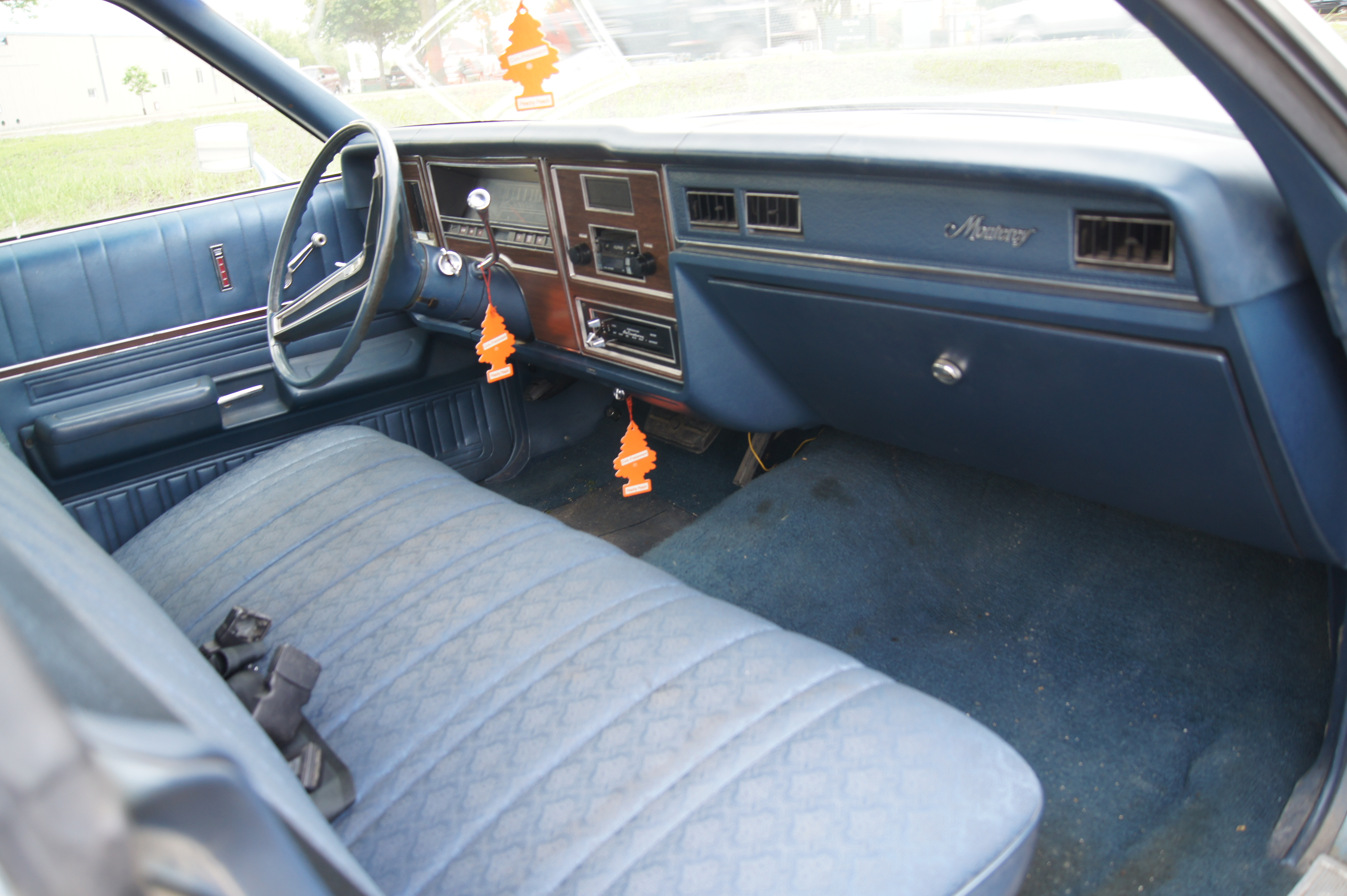
1974 Mercury Monterey interior (front seat)

=== Powertrain ===
The 351 Windsor and 400 cu in (6.6 L) Cleveland V8s were added for 1971, the final year for the 390. The 429 V8, which was standard on the Marquis beginning in 1969, was available as an extra cost option on all Monterey models each year including a two-barrel 320-horsepower version and a four-barrel 360-horsepower option from 1969 to 1971. Both of those 429s were replaced by single 209 net horsepower 429 four-barrel for 1972, which was designed to run on regular, low lead or unleaded gasoline as was the case with all Ford Motor Company engines starting with the 1972 model year.

Engine offerings for 1973–74 included the 351 Windsor two-barrel standard on base Montereys and the Cleveland-based 400 two-barrel standard on Monterey Custom and optional on base models. The 429 V8 was discontinued after 1973 and Lincoln's 460 V8 became the top option on all models for 1974.

== The Monterey in Canada ==
In addition to selling the Monterey the Ford Motor Company of Canada also offered the Mercury 400, albeit only for 1963. It was essentially a Monterey with lower-level trim and a six cylinder engine as standard.

After 1963, the Monterey was not sold in Canada, but was supplanted by the resurrected Meteor. Meteor competed in the low-priced field, but its upper trim series (Montcalm and LeMoyne) were typically very similar to the U.S. Monterey both in styling and appointments. Meteor continued as a separate marque through 1976 (1975–76 models continued the 1974 Monterey's front end styling) after which the name was applied to a base trim version of the Marquis, as the "Mercury Marquis Meteor" through 1981.

== See also ==
- Timeline of most powerful production cars
