= Mercury Commuter =

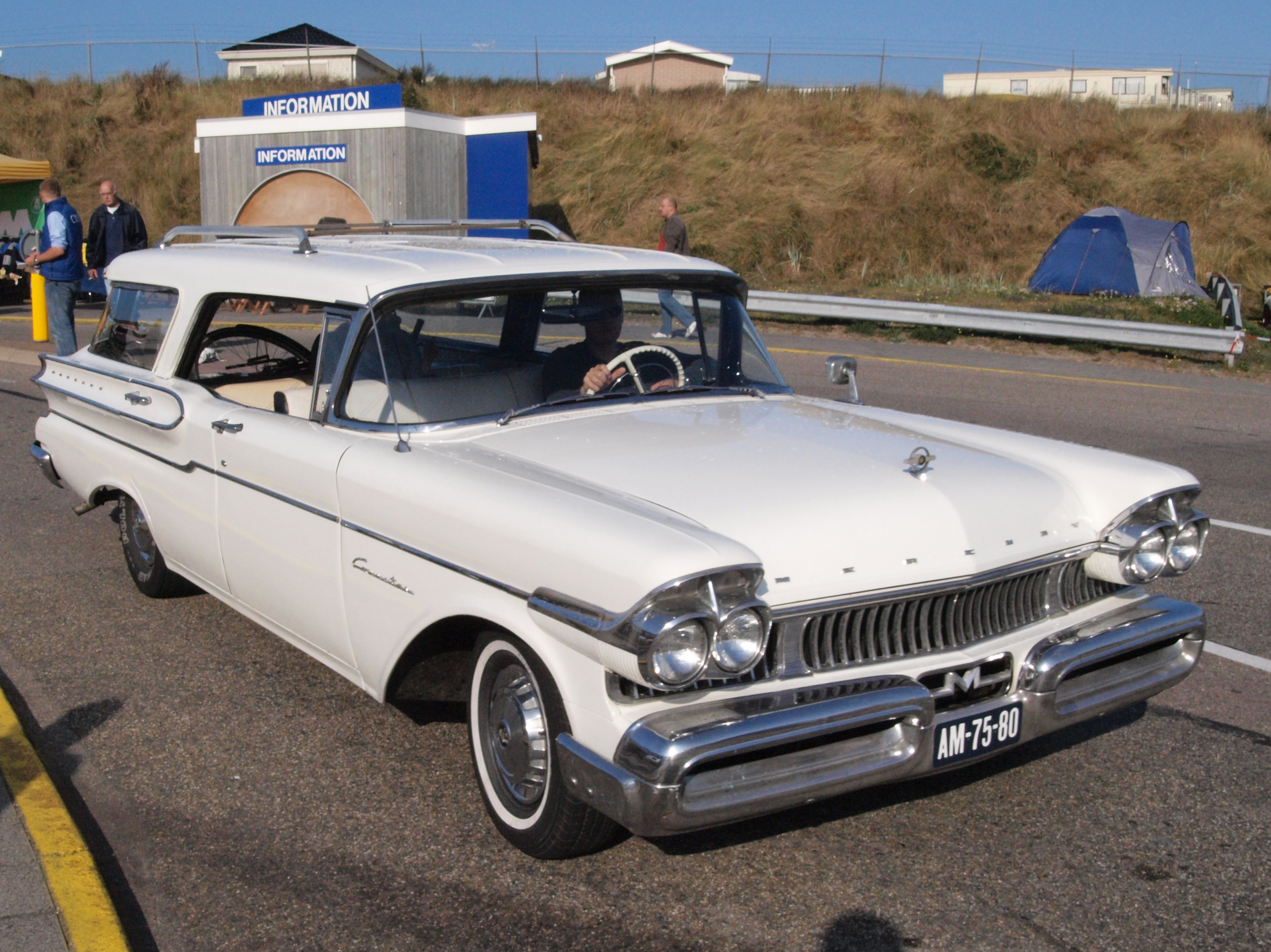
- 1957 Mercury Commuter 4-door (with four headlight "Quadri Beam" option)

Overview
- Manufacturer: Mercury (Ford)
- Production: 1957–1962; 1964–1968

Body and chassis
- Class: Full-size
- Body style: 2-door station wagon 4-door station wagon
- Layout: FR layout
- Related: Mercury Monterey; Ford Del Rio; Ford Ranch Wagon

Powertrain
- Engine: 312 cu in (5.1 L) V8; 368 cu in (6.0 L) Lincoln Y-Block V8; 390 cu in (6.4 L) V8; 428 cu in (7.0 L) V8

Dimensions
- Wheelbase: 126.0 in (3,200 mm)
- Length: 1959: 218.2 in (5,542 mm); 1960: 219.2 in (5,568 mm)
- Width: 1959: 80.7 in (2,050 mm); 1960: 81.5 in (2,070 mm)
- Height: 57.8 in (1,468 mm)
- Curb weight: 4,800–4,900 lb (2,200–2,200 kg)

The Mercury Commuter is a full-size station wagon that was produced by Mercury from 1957 until 1968. When introduced for the 1957 model year it was priced below Mercury's other two new full size wagons as a part of the Mercury Monterey series, alongside the mid-range Voyager and the top-level Colony Park. In 1957 the same 368 cu in (6.0 L) Lincoln Y-Block V8 that was standard equipment on the Mercury Turnpike Cruiser was optional equipment on the Commuter. From 1957 until 1960 all Mercury station wagons were hardtops, and also offered a rear window that retracted into the tailgate that was not offered on Ford branded station wagons.

The Commuter was initially available as a two-door wagon and as a four-door wagon. Due to the two-door only selling just over 7,600 units in 1957-59, the two-door was dropped from the 1960 model range.

In 1959 all Mercury station wagons were combined into the "Country Cruiser" series. It was temporarily absent in 1963, in concession to the new, smaller intermediate Meteor station wagons, but the full-sized platform was reinstated for 1964, when the Meteor was discontinued. The Commuter was phased out, like the full-size Mercury Montclair and Park Lane, after the 1968 model year when the Colony Park became the only Mercury station wagon until 1991.

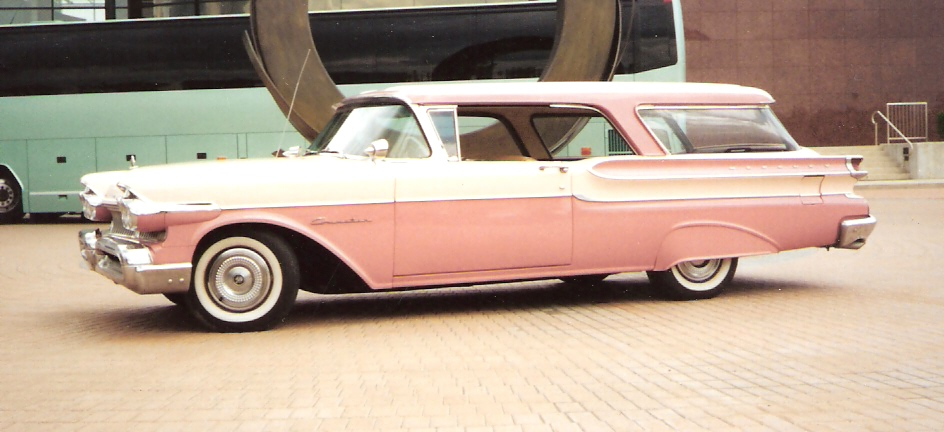
1957 Mercury Commuter 2-door

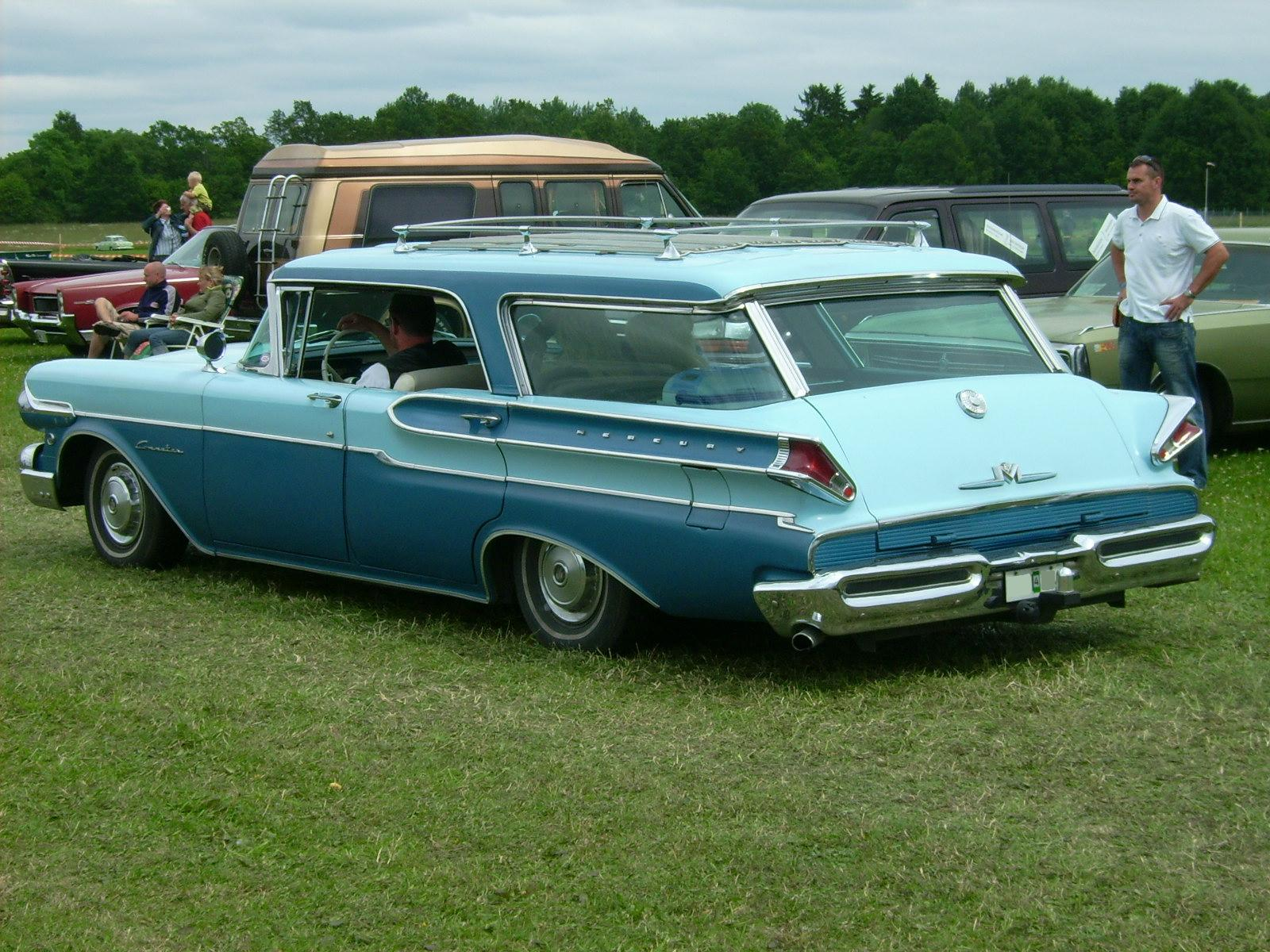
1957 Mercury Commuter 4-door

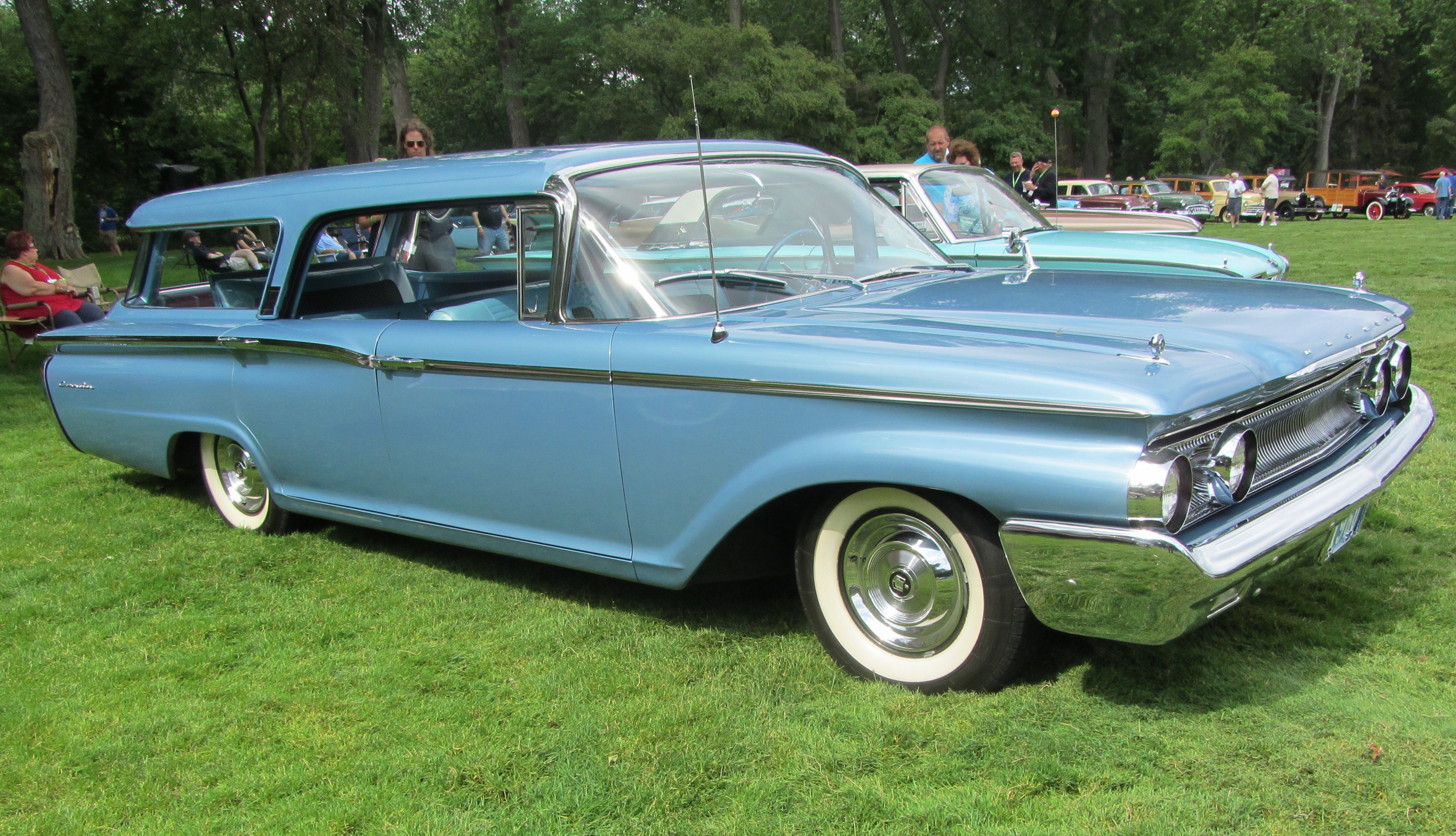
1960 Mercury Country Cruiser Commuter

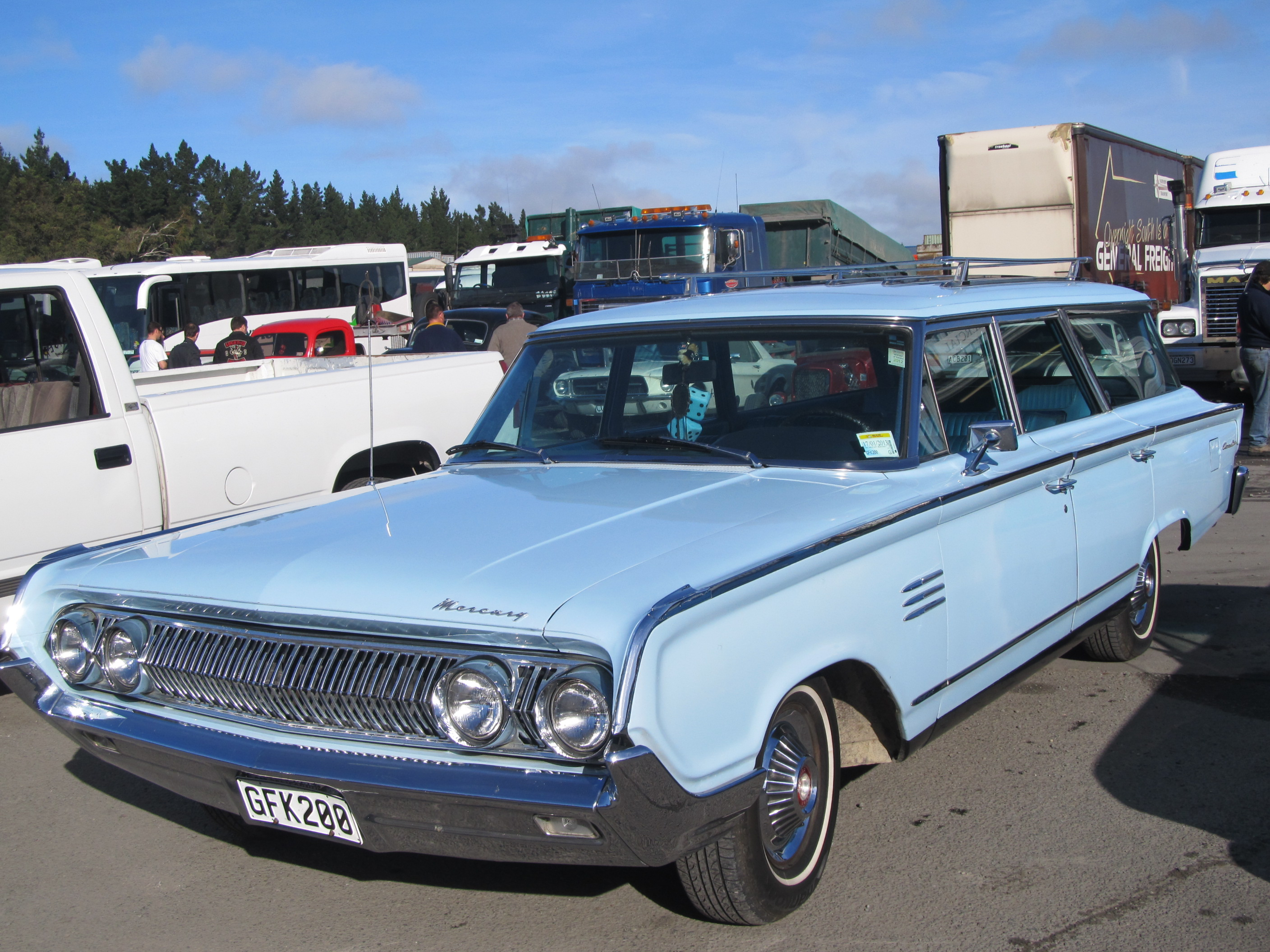
1964 Mercury Commuter station wagon

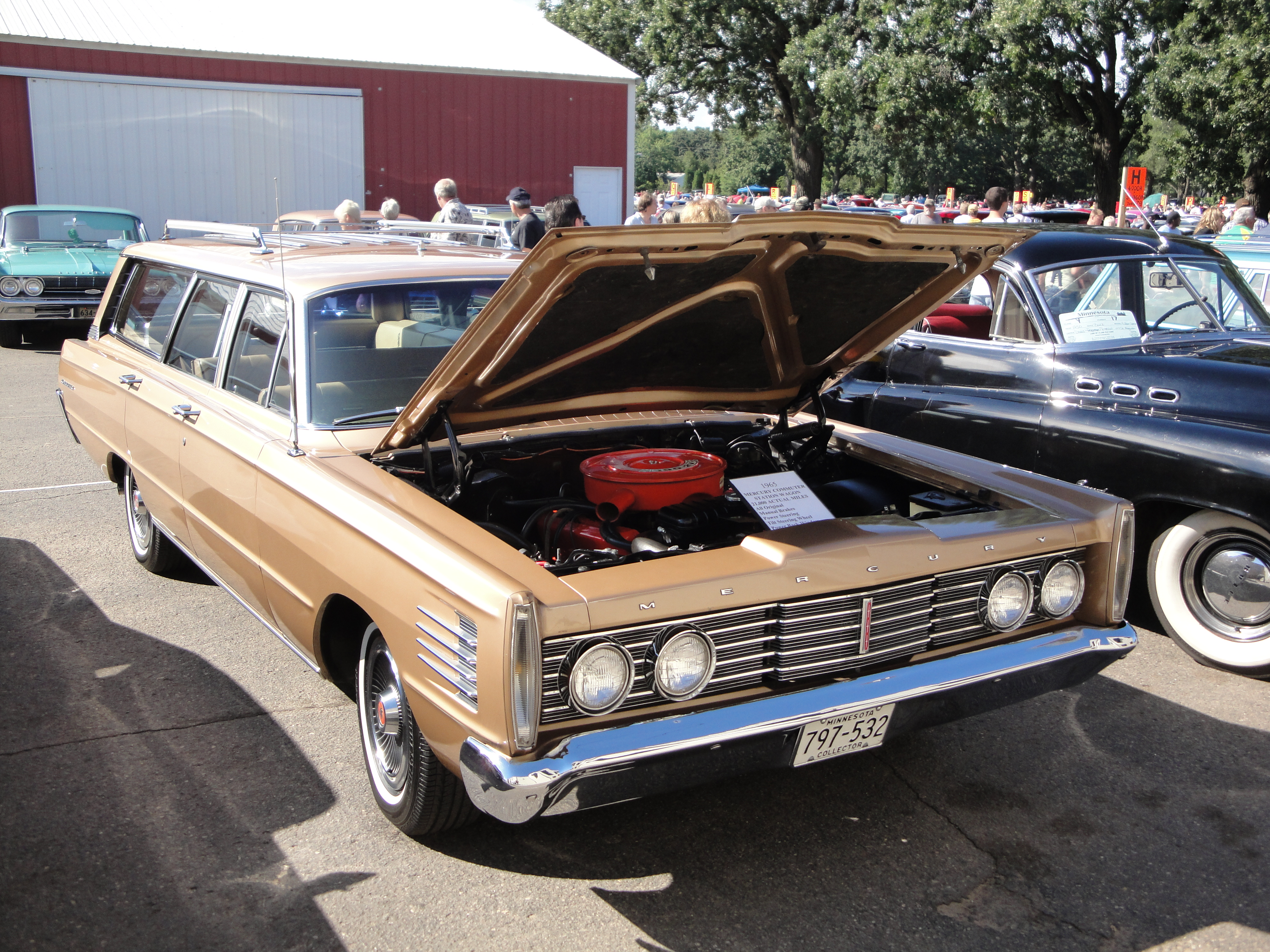
1965 Mercury Commuter Station Wagon
