= Lincoln Y-block V8 engine =

Lincoln Y-block V8
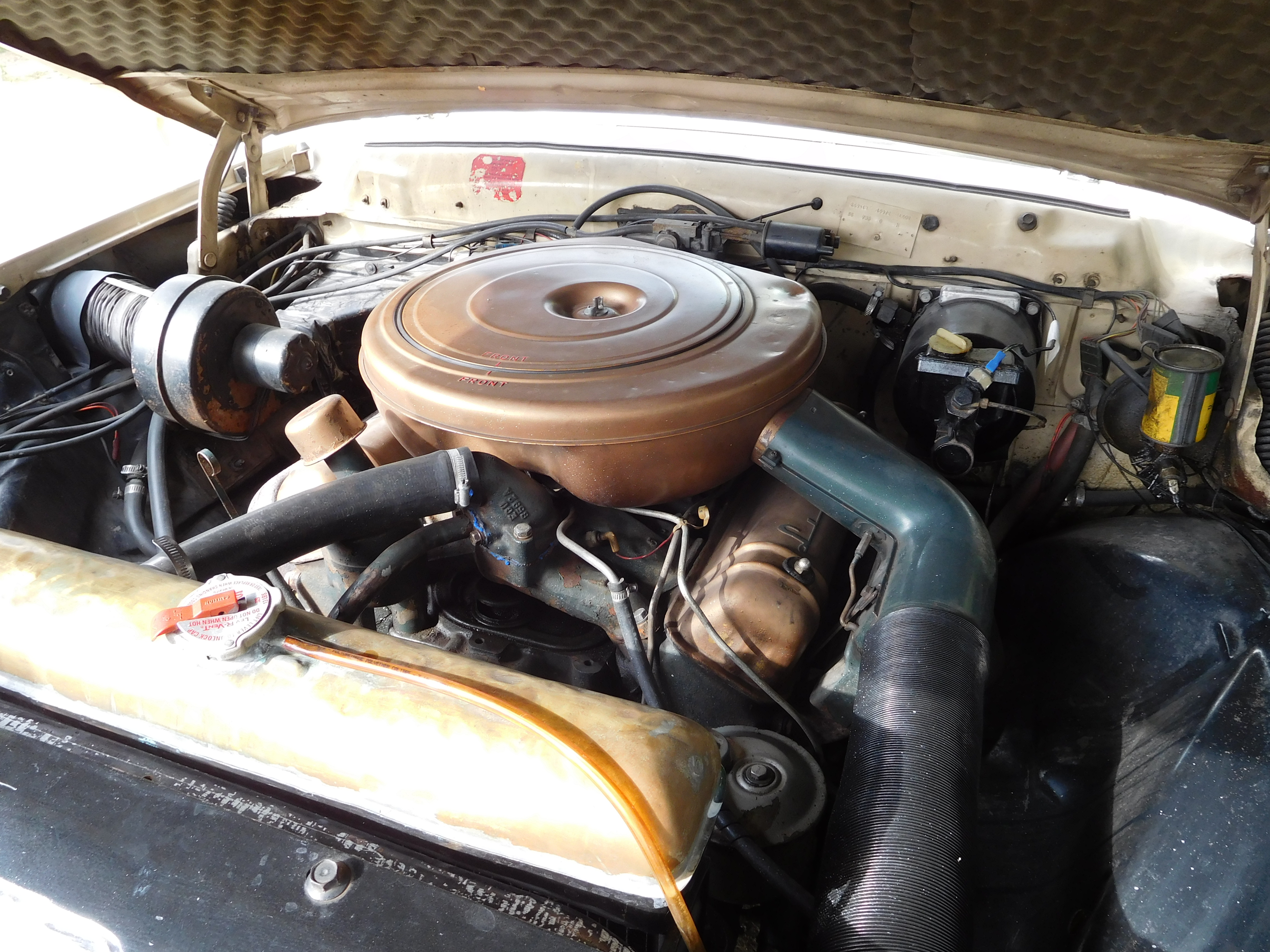

Overview
- Manufacturer: Ford Motor Company
- Production: 1952-1963

Layout
- Configuration: Big-block V8
- Displacement: 279 cu in (4.6 L); 302 cu in (4.9 L); 317 cu in (5.2 L); 332 cu in (5.4 L); 341 cu in (5.6 L); 368 cu in (6.0 L)
- Cylinder bore: 3.562 in (90.5 mm); 3 5/8 in (92.1 mm); 3.80 in (96.5 mm); 3.94 in (100.1 mm); 4 in (101.6 mm)
- Piston stroke: 3 1/2 in (88.9 mm); 3.66 in (93.0 mm)
- Valvetrain: OHV 2 valves x cyl.

Combustion
- Fuel system: Holley 4-bbl. carburetor
- Fuel type: Gasoline
- Cooling system: Water-cooled

Output
- Power output: 152–300 hp (113–224 kW)
- Torque output: 246–415 lb⋅ft (334–563 N⋅m)

Chronology
- Predecessor: Flathead V8
- Successor: Ford MEL V8; Ford Super Duty engine

The Lincoln Y-block V8 engine was Ford's earliest OHV V8 engine, introduced by Lincoln in the 1952 model year. Like the later and better-known but even more short-lived Ford Y-block engine, its block's deep skirts gave the block the appearance of the letter Y from the front.

The Y-block's development was in response to the sales success of the competing Oldsmobile "Rocket" and Cadillac OHV V8 engines, introduced in the 1949 model year, the Buick "Nailhead" engine introduced in the 1953 model year, and the OHV V8 Chrysler Hemi engine in 1951. Also, Ford needed larger and more powerful truck engines. The basic engine design was produced through 1963. It was replaced by the newer MEL engine for car applications in 1958, and was replaced in heavy-duty truck applications by the FT (330/361/391) engines starting in 1964.

== 279 ==
A 279 cu in (4.6 L) version of the Lincoln Y-block was produced for heavy-duty truck applications for the 1952 through 1955 model years. The engine had a bore of 3.5625 in (90.5 mm) and a stroke of 3.5 in (88.9 mm).

== 302 ==
The 302 cu in (4.9 L) version of the Lincoln Y-block was used for heavy-duty truck applications from the 1956 through the 1963 model year. The engine had a bore of 3.625 in (92.1 mm) and a stroke of 3.65625 in (92.9 mm) with a forged steel crankshaft. Power output was 187–196 hp (139–146 kW). The engine was optional equipment on the Ford T-700 Series and standard equipment on the Ford F-750, C-750, and B-750 Series heavy-duty trucks.

== 317 ==
The first-generation Y-block was the 317 cu in (5.2 L), which replaced the undersquare 337 cu in (5.5 L) flathead V8 on all Lincolns in the 1952 model year and was produced through 1954. The 317 was oversquare, as was rapidly becoming the fashion, with a bore of 3.80 in (96.5 mm) and a stroke of 3.5 in (88.9 mm). Power output with a two-barrel carburetor was 160 hp (119 kW). Higher compression, larger intake valves, a Holley four-barrel, improved intake and exhaust, and a more aggressive camshaft, the next year increased it all the way to 205 hp (153 kW). The engine was unchanged in 1954 except for the vacuum advance mechanism. These engines used hydraulic valve lifters while Ford truck engines used solid. The stock Lincoln 317 powered the "Mexican Road Race Lincolns". The 317 was replaced by the 341 for automobile applications in the 1955 model year. Like the 279, the 317 was also used in heavy-duty truck applications for the 1952-55 model years .

Lincolns, powered by the 317, won the top four spots in the Stock Car category of the Pan American Road Race in both 1952 and 1953. In 1954 Lincolns took first and second place.

== 332 ==
The 332 cu in (5.4 L) version of the Lincoln Y-block was used for heavy-duty truck applications from the 1956 through the 1963 model year. Ford advertised them in their trucks as the "Torque King Y-8" engines

The engine had a bore of 3.80 in (96.5 mm) and a stroke of 3.65625 in (92.9 mm) with a forged steel crankshaft. In its first year of production in 1956 it produced 190 hp with the two-barrel carburetor, and 200 hp with the four-barrel carburetor, as well as 306 and 316 lb-ft of torque respectively. Compression was listed at 7.5 to 1. The engine featured sodium filled exhaust valves standard. It also featured reinforced pistons with steel inserts for the top ring groove, as well as dual oil control rings.

In 1957 power was increased to 212 hp (158 kW) and 328 lb-ft of torque with the four-barrel carburetor being standard. Compression was boosted to 7.6 to 1.

By 1961 power had dropped down to 200 hp, and 307 lb-ft of torque.

The engine was standard equipment on the Ford F-800, F-900, T-750, T-800, C-800, and C-900 Series heavy-duty trucks.

== 341 ==
The 317 cu in (5.2 L) automobile engine was bored out in 1955 to 3.94 in (100.1 mm), displacing 341 cu in (5.6 L). Power was up to 225 hp (168 kW) and torque 450 N⋅m (332 lb⋅ft). in its sole year of production.

== 368 ==
In the 1956 model year the 341's bore was increased to 4 in (101.6 mm) and stroke to 3.65625 in (92.9 mm) to create a 368 cu in (6.0 L) engine that produced 285 hp (213 kW) and 545 N⋅m (402 lb⋅ft). In 1957 power increased to 300 hp (224 kW) with 563 N⋅m (415 lb⋅ft) of torque but the Lincoln still lagged in power and torque behind the Chrysler Hemi 392 used on the Imperial, Chrysler New Yorker, and 300C, and in power behind the 3-2bbl version of the Cadillac 365 used on the Eldorado. The 368 was standard equipment on all Lincolns in the 1956 and 1957 model years, and standard on the Mercury Turnpike Cruiser and Colony Park and optional on the Mercury Montclair, Monterey, Voyager, and Commuter in 1957, its final year.

== Lincoln Y-block engine family ==
Displacement	Bore	Stroke	Power	Torque	Years	Usage
279	3 9/16 in (90.5 mm)	3 1/2 in (88.9 mm)	152 hp (113 kW)	246 lb⋅ft (334 N⋅m)	1952-1955	Ford heavy duty trucks
302	3 5/8 in (92.1 mm)	3 21/32 in (92.9 mm)	187–196 hp (139–146 kW)	280-299 lb-ft	1956-1963	Ford heavy duty trucks
317	3 4/5 in (96.5 mm)	3 1/2 in (88.9 mm)	160–205 hp (119–153 kW)	284–305 lb⋅ft (385–414 N⋅m)	1952-1955	Lincoln and Ford HD trucks
332	3 4/5 in (96.5 mm)	3 21/32 in (92.9 mm)	190–212 hp (142–158 kW)	306-328 lb-ft	1956-1963	Ford heavy duty trucks
341	3 15/16 in (100.0 mm)	3 1/2 in (88.9 mm)	225 hp (168 kW)	332 lb⋅ft (450 N⋅m)	1955	Lincoln
368	4 in (101.6 mm)	3 21/32 in (92.9 mm)	285–300 hp (213–224 kW)	402–415 lb⋅ft (545–563 N⋅m)	1956-1957	Lincoln and Mercury

== See also ==
- List of Ford engines
