= Mercury Colony Park =

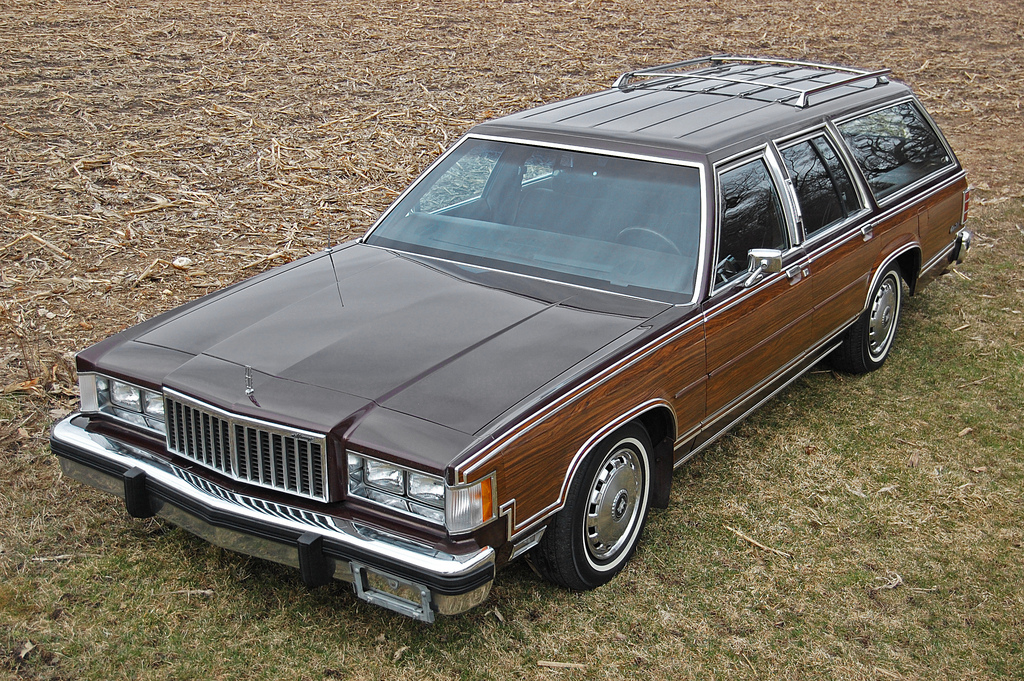
- 1984 Colony Park

Overview
- Manufacturer: Mercury (Ford)
- Model years: 1957–1991
- Assembly: Wayne, Michigan; St. Louis, Missouri; Pico Rivera, California; Metuchen, New Jersey

Body and chassis
- Class: Full-size
- Body style: 4-door station wagon
- Layout: FR layout

Chronology
- Predecessor: Mercury Monterey station wagon (1956)

The Mercury Colony Park is a station wagon that was marketed by Mercury from the 1957 to 1991 model years. Distinguished by its simulated wood-grain paneling, the Colony Park was marketed as either the premium trim or the sole full-size station wagon offering of the division. Following the 1960 demise of Edsel, full-size Mercury vehicles shared bodywork with Ford, with the Colony Park serving as the counterpart of the Ford Country Squire through 1991.

Serving as the flagship station wagon series of Ford Motor Company (as of current production, Lincoln has not yet marketed a factory-produced station wagon), the model line was marketed against the Chrysler Town & Country (prior to its 1979 downsizing) and the Buick Estate and Oldsmobile Custom Cruiser – alongside the Colony Park, each were distinguished by (simulated) woodgrain trim, 3-row interior seating, and a V8 engine.

Initially the station wagon counterpart of the Mercury Turnpike Cruiser, the Colony Park was typically a counterpart of flagship Mercury sedans, matching the Park Lane, Marquis, and Grand Marquis. From 1957 to 1968, the Mercury Commuter (a counterpart of the Monterey) was offered as a lower-cost alternative (without the external wood trim). From 1969, the Colony Park became the sole full-size Mercury station wagon for nearly the rest of its production.

During the 1980s, sales of the model line declined as consumer interest shifted towards vans and four-door SUVs, along with internal competition from the newer Mercury Sable station wagon. For the 1992 model year, the Mercury Grand Marquis underwent an extensive redesign, dropping the station wagon body from its lineup – for the next two decades until its closure, Mercury would not again market a full-size station wagon.

== Background ==
Following the 1952 introduction of the Mercury Monterey, Mercury expanded its model range for 1953 by adding a station wagon (its first four-door station wagon since 1941). Sharing its roofline, three-row seating configuration, and two-piece tailgate design with the Ford Country Squire, the Monterey station wagon was fitted with exterior woodgrain trim as standard equipment.

After 1953, American manufacturers largely abandoned wood-panel construction for station wagon bodies. Along with the high cost of construction, the wood often required higher upkeep and maintenance than car bodies with full-metal construction.

For 1954, the Monterey station wagon (along with the Country Squire) traded real wood body paneling for full-steel construction; the "Woodie" appearance was maintained by mahogany-style DI-NOC vinyl wrap and fiberglass trim, which was far less expensive and essentially maintenance-free. Though Ford and Mercury would become the only American-brand station wagons sold with (simulated) wood paneling for over a decade, the styling feature would later become associated with multiple American station wagon lines from the mid-1960s to the early 1990s.

For the 1957 redesign of its model range, Mercury split its sedans and station wagons into distinct model ranges (echoing a change made by Ford for 1955). The Monterey became the standard Mercury sedan, slotted below the mid-range Montclair and flagship Turnpike Cruiser. The station wagon range was introduced as a base-trim Mercury Commuter and mid-price Mercury Voyager; both lines were offered in two-door and four-door configurations. Offered only as a four-door wagon, the Colony Park served as the flagship of the model line. To position the model upmarket (against the Buick Estate and the Chrysler Town & Country), the Colony Park was styled with exterior woodgrain trim.

To further distinguish the model range from Ford (and Edsel) wagons, all Mercury wagons were given hardtop rooflines. Though offered optionally by AMC, Buick, and Oldsmobile, Mercury was the only American-brand manufacturer to offer hardtop rooflines as standard equipment for all station wagon models.

== First generation (1957–1958) ==
First generation
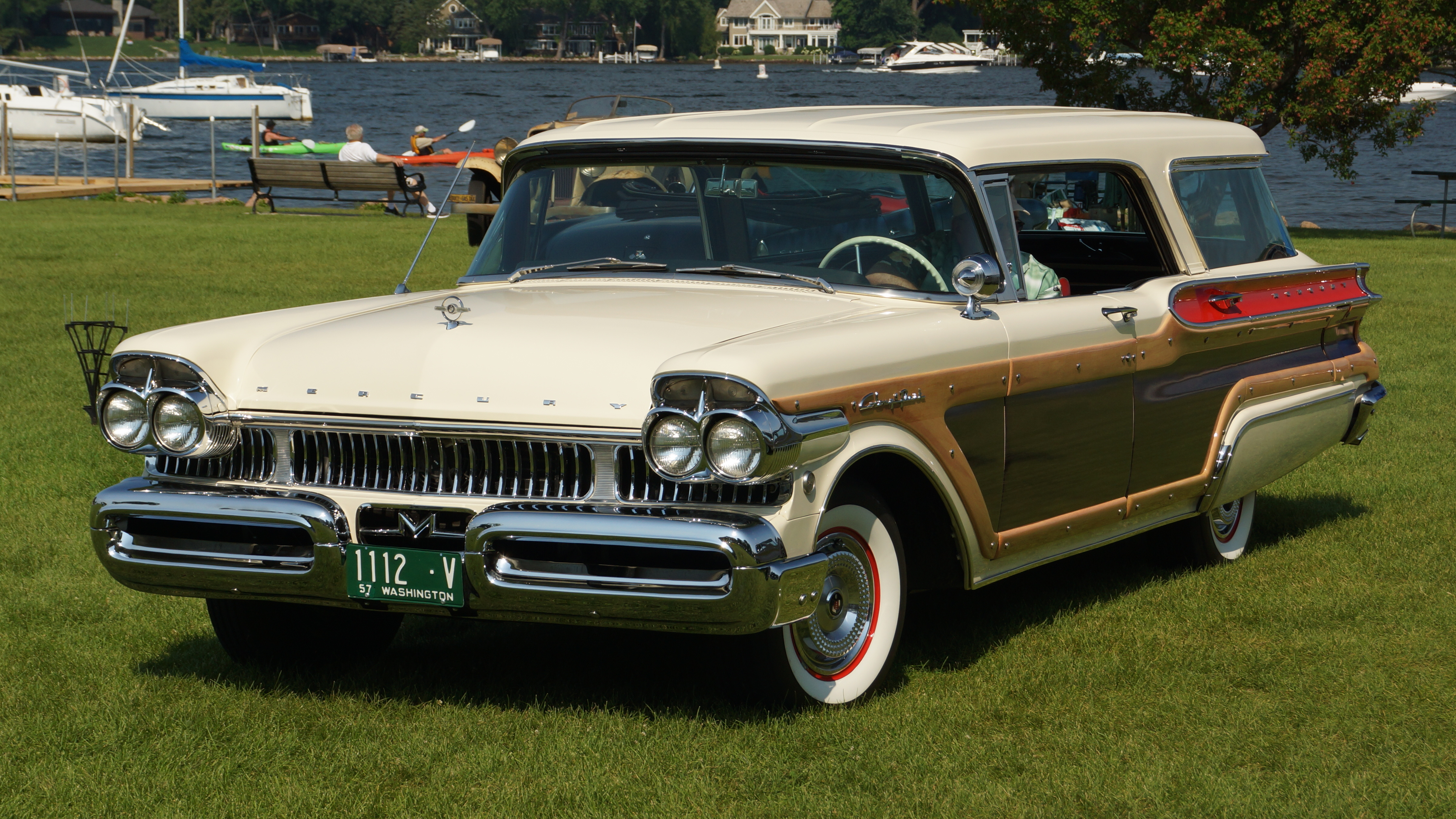
- 1957 Mercury Colony Park

Overview
- Model years: 1957–1958

Body and chassis
- Related: (sedan); Mercury Turnpike Cruiser; Mercury Park Lane; Mercury Montclair; Mercury Monterey; Edsel Citation; Edsel Corsair (station wagon); Mercury Voyager; Mercury Commuter; Ford Country Sedan; Ford Country Squire

Powertrain
- Engine: 368 cu in (6.0 L) Lincoln Y-Block V8; 383 cu in (6.3 L) Marauder V8; 430 cu in (7.0 L) Super Marauder V8
- Transmission: 3-speed manual 3-speed Merc-O-Matic automatic

Dimensions
- Wheelbase: 122.0 in (3,099 mm)
- Length: 1957: 211.1 in (5,362 mm); 1958: 214.2 in (5,441 mm)
- Width: 79.1 in (2,009 mm)
- Height: 58.3 in (1,481 mm)
- Curb weight: 4,400–4,800 lb (2,000–2,200 kg)

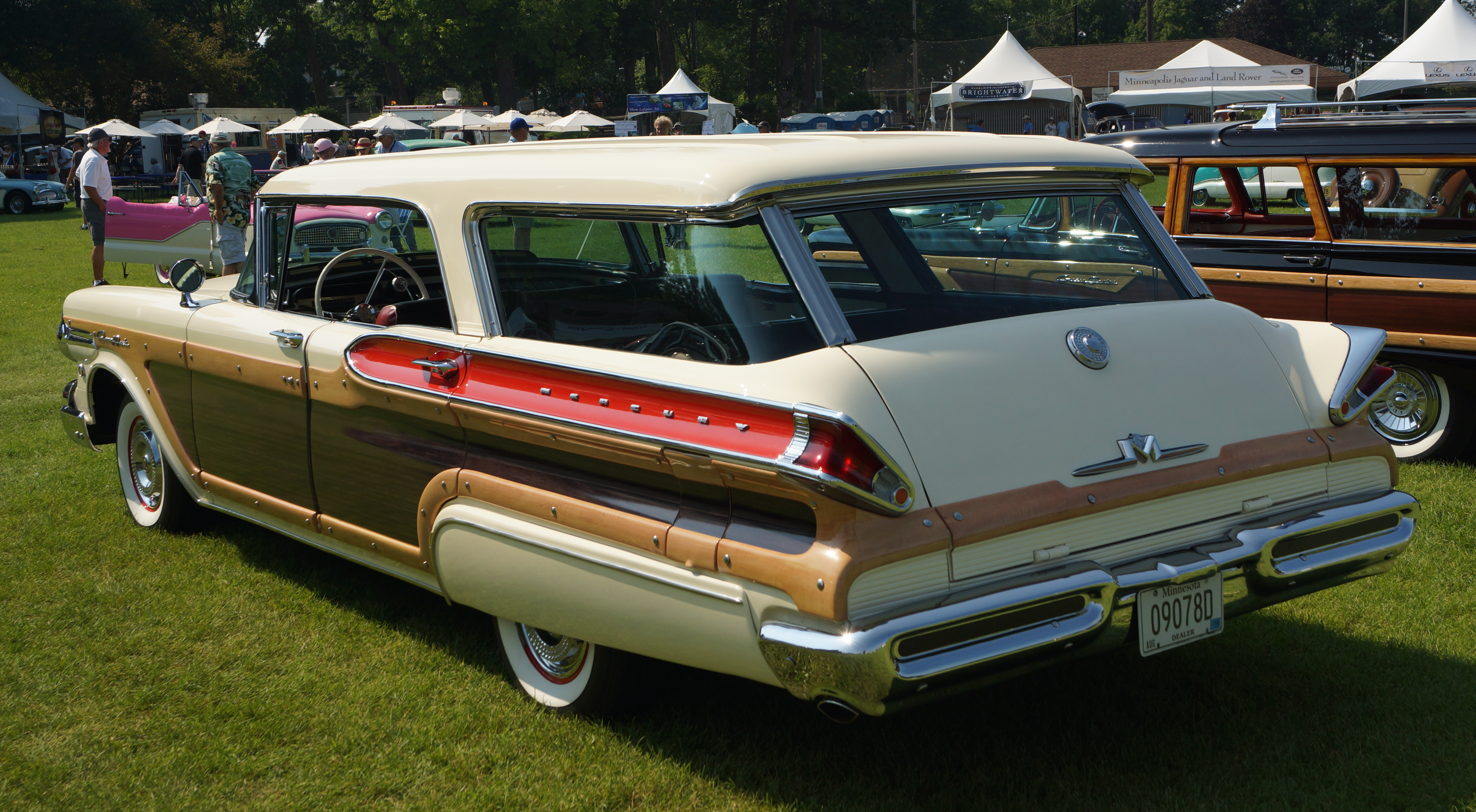
1957 Mercury Colony Park rear

For 1957, Mercury released the Colony Park as its flagship station wagon line. Offered only as a four-door hardtop wagon, the Colony Park shared its body with the four-door Mercury Commuter and Voyager and its front bodywork with the Turnpike Cruiser. As with the preceding Monterey wagon, the Colony Park was styled with simulated mahogany exterior paneling and maple trim.

Sharing trim commonality between the Montclair and the Turnpike Cruiser (the anodized gold trim of the latter was made optional), the Colony Park was among the first station wagons to offer a tailgate with a retractable rear window (optionally power-operated); the hardware was adopted for the "Breezeway" rear window of the Turnpike Cruiser. Offered solely with two or three rows of seating (a flat-folding second-row seat and a removable third-row seat), the Colony Park offered nine-passenger seating (distinguished by rear vent windows behind the C-pillars); the interior was fitted with full carpeting. In rudimentary form, several features seen in modern cars were offered as options, including automatic climate control, power seat position memory, signal-seeking radio, and power windows (including the tailgate window); in 1958, a driver-operated speed-limit warning system was introduced as an option. As a counterpart to the Ford Lifeguard option, Mercury standardized many of the features previously introduced, making only the padded dashboard and sunvisors and front seatbelts optional. To further enhance driving safety, a "Visual Aid" option package installed tinted windows, windshield wiper washers, reverse lights, and a non-glare rearview mirror.

For 1958, the Mercury line received revisions to their front and rear bodywork. The headlight surrounds were reshaped to better integrate the quad headlight units and a larger front bumper (now featuring the gold "Big M" of the Turnpike Cruiser). Though the scalloped fins remained, the taillamps were reshaped from a delta shape to a rocket style, with additional chrome trim on the C-pillars.

=== Chassis details ===
For 1957, the Colony Park was fitted with a 290 hp 368 cubic-inch Lincoln Y-Block V8, shared with the Turnpike Cruiser. For 1958, the Y-block was retired from car use and replaced by the Ford MEL engine, the first "big-block" Ford V8 engine. A 330 hp 383 cubic-inch "Marauder" V8 became standard, with a 430 cubic-inch "Super Marauder" V8 offered as an option. In contrast to its use in Lincolns, the 400 hp Super Marauder engine used triple two-barrel carburetors (becoming the first mass-produced American engine with a rated 400 hp output). Though a three-speed manual was standard equipment (with an optional 4-speed manual), the 3-speed automatic replaced a column-mounted shifter with mechanically activated pushbutton transmission controls. Developed in response to the pushbutton unit introduced by Chrysler in 1956, the left-mounted "Keyboard Control" integrated engine starting, gear selection, and parking brake use; as a safety feature, reverse gear was locked out above 10 mph and selecting "Park" locked out all other functions until it was released. For 1958, the control panel was revised; along with a simpler layout, an optional "Multi-Drive" version introduced multiple drive modes for the 3-speed automatic. The Multi-Drive system was the only transmission paired with the Super Marauder V8.

=== Sales ===
For 1957, the Colony Park was listed with a retail price of US$3,677 ($42,150 in 2025 dollars) and 7,386 were manufactured.

First-generation Colony Park production
Year	Sales
1957	7,386
1958	4,474

== Second generation (1959–1960) ==
Second generation
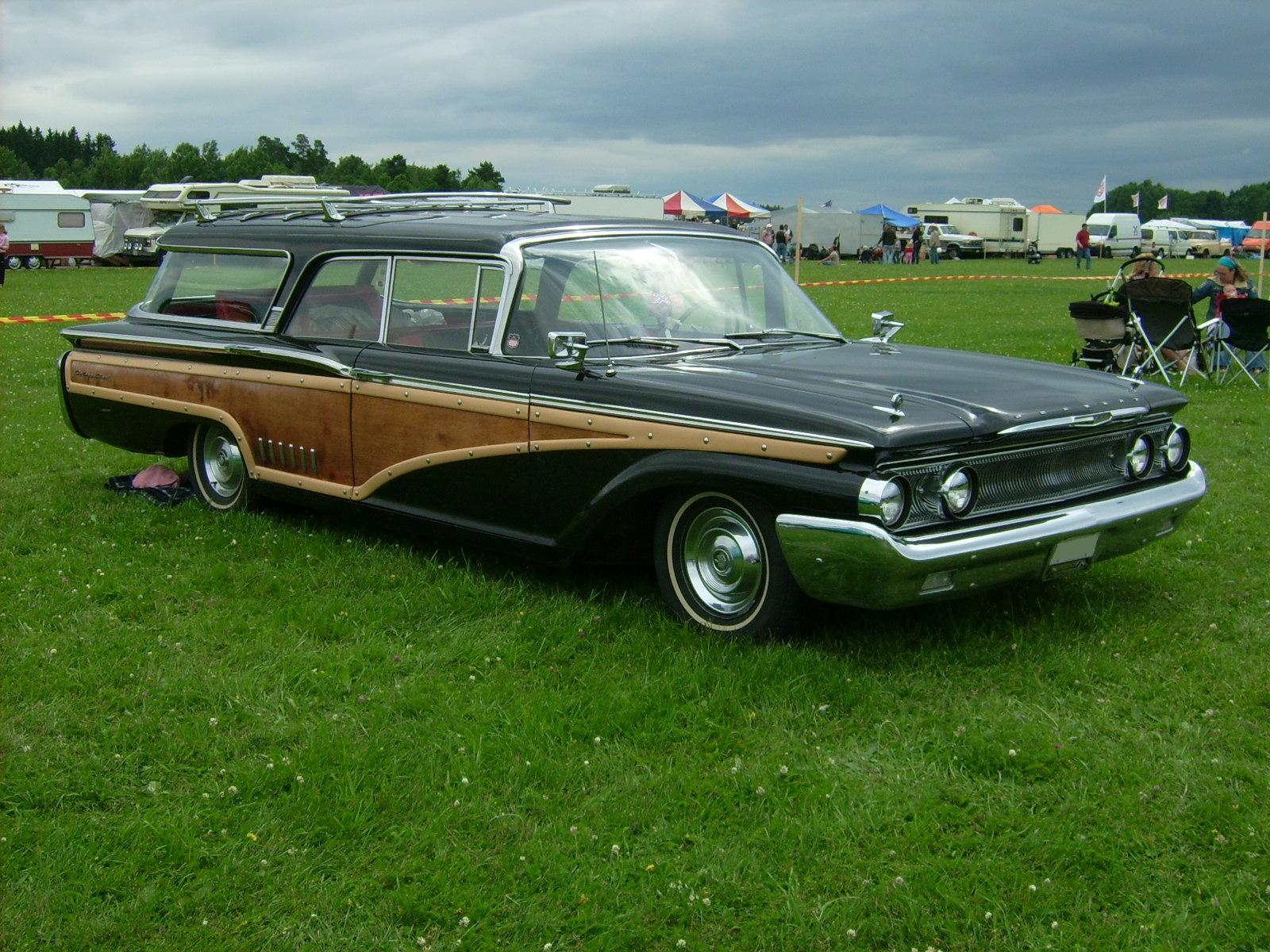
- 1960 Mercury Country Cruiser Colony Park

Overview
- Model years: 1959–1960

Body and chassis
- Related: (sedan); Mercury Park Lane; Mercury Montclair; Mercury Monterey; Ford Galaxie (station wagon); Mercury Commuter; Ford Country Squire

Powertrain
- Engine: 383 cu in (6.3 L) Marauder V8; 430 cu in (7.0 L) Marauder V8
- Transmission: 3-speed Merc-O-Matic automatic

Dimensions
- Wheelbase: 126.0 in (3,200 mm)
- Length: 219.2 in (5,568 mm)
- Width: 81.5 in (2,070 mm)
- Height: 57.8 in (1,468 mm)
- Curb weight: 4,800–4,900 lb (2,200–2,200 kg)

For 1959, Mercury introduced the second-generation Colony Park as part of its new "Country Cruiser" station wagon series, again slotted above the Commuter and Voyager. Originally developed to share its chassis (moving to a 126-inch wheelbase) with the premium Edsel Corsair and Edsel Citation, the cancellation of the premium Edsel lines left Mercury with its own car (for the first time since 1940). As Ford began to wind down Edsel, the Colony Park now also superseded the discontinued Edsel Bermuda wagon.

Offered as in a 4-door 9-passenger configuration, the larger body (growing to a 126-inch wheelbase) retained the hardtop roofline of the previous generation; though the A-pillar was now vertical, the windshield grew significantly in size. The interior underwent several major upgrades towards its functionality, as the optional third-row seat was changed from a removable unit to a fold-flat design; along with matching the function of the second row, the upright third row allowed for additional storage behind it. To increase seat room, revised driveshaft mounting created a nearly flat floor for the second-row seat.

For 1960, the Country Cruiser line underwent several revisions, with Mercury discontinuing the mid-range Voyager and all two-door wagons; all wagons were now single-tone Commuters or wood-trim Colony Parks. Though the interior saw only nominal changes, the exterior saw substantial revisions, as the headlights were moved into the grille, and the hoodline lowered. The scalloped fins introduced in 1957 were deleted, with chrome trim forming vestigial fins above large vertical taillamps. In a preview of what would happen over much of the next decade, Mercury reduced the coverage of the woodgrain trim over the side bodywork.

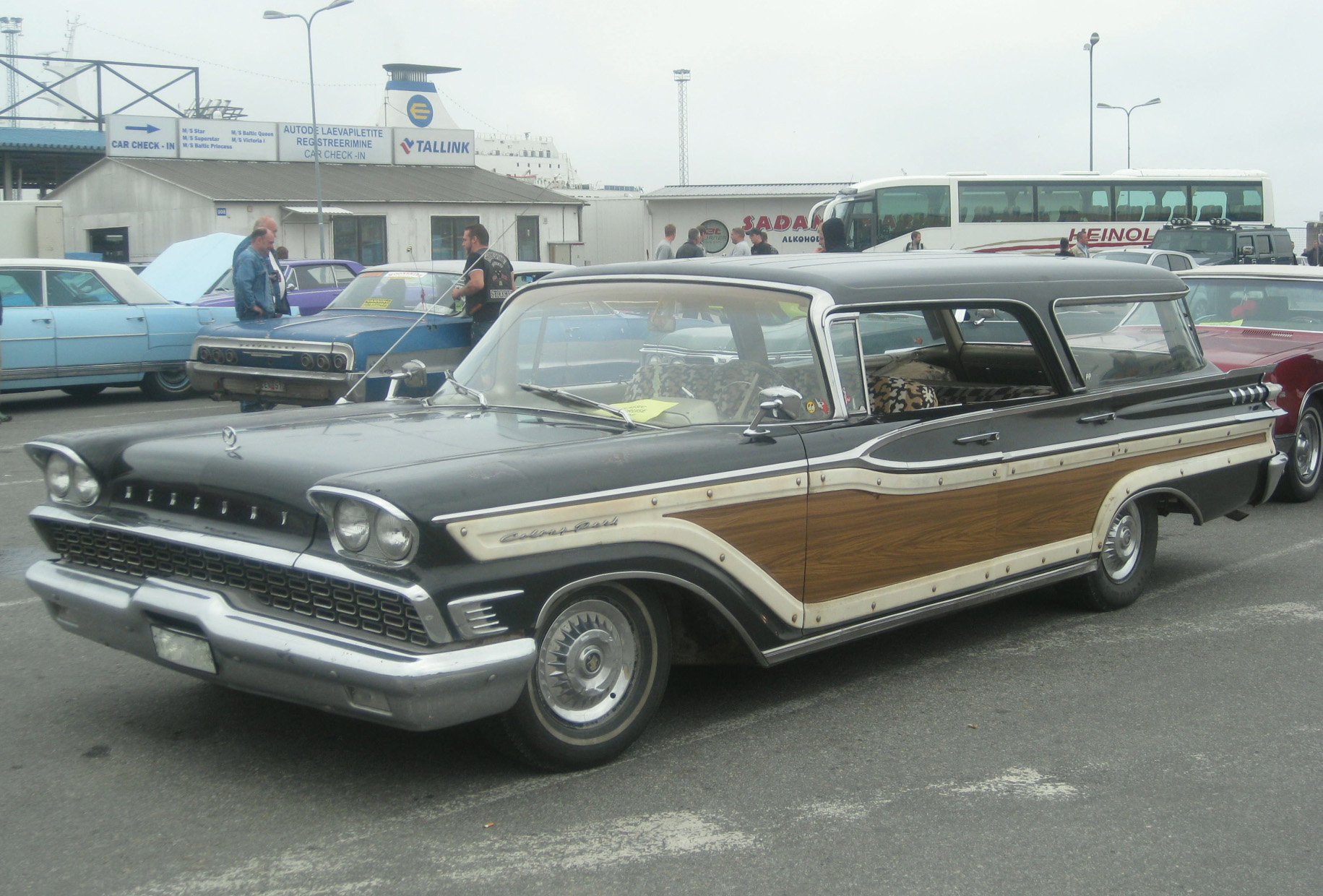
1959 Mercury Colony Park

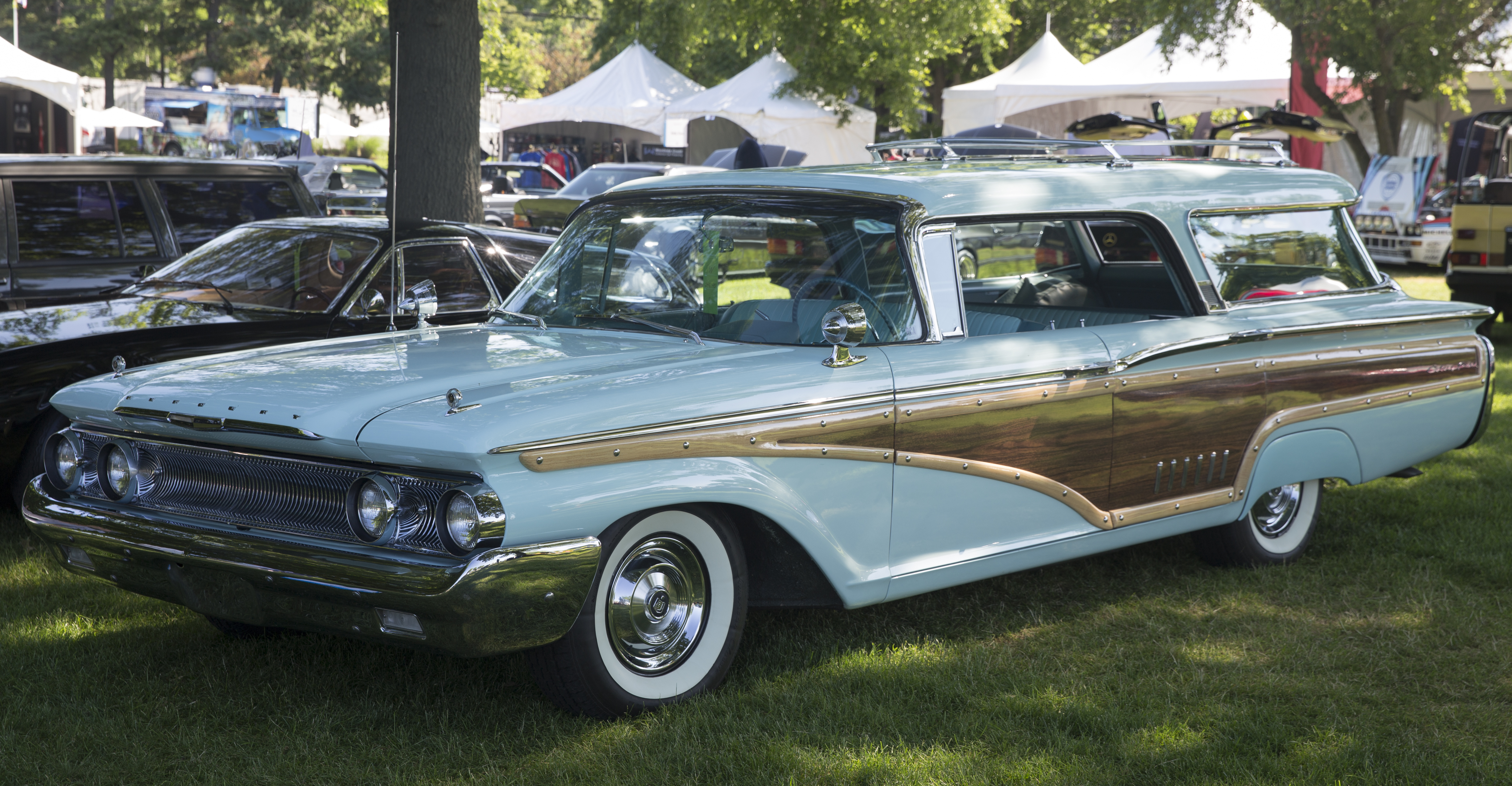
1960 Mercury Colony Park

=== Chassis details ===
For 1959, the 383 Marauder V8 became the sole V8 (retuned to 322 hp). Though less problematic than the controversial Edsel Teletouch controls, Mercury reverted from pushbutton controls for its Merc-O-Matic 3-speed automatic (now the standard transmission) to a conventional column-mounted PRNDL shifter. For 1960, the 430 V8 returned as an option after a one-year hiatus; in place of the triple-carburetor Super Marauder, a 310 hp Marauder version used a single 4-barrel carburetor. In various outputs, this engine was shared with Lincolns and Continentals, along with Ford Thunderbird.

=== Sales ===
The 1959 Colony Park was listed with a retail price of US$3,932 ($43,427 in 2025 dollars) and manufactured 5,929, making surviving examples somewhat rare.

Second-generation Colony Park production (6- and 9 passenger combined)
Year	Sales
1959	5,959
1960	7,411

== Third generation (1961–1964) ==
Third generation
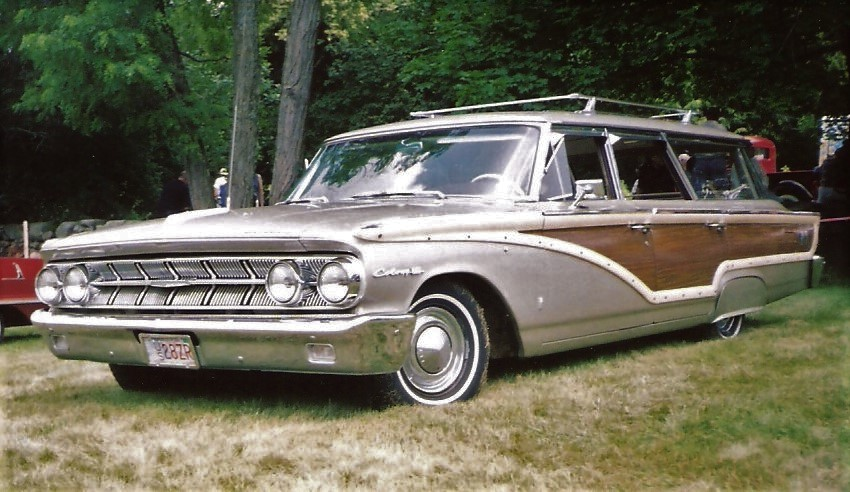
- 1963 Mercury Monterey Custom Colony Park

Overview
- Model years: 1961–1964

Body and chassis
- Related: Mercury Park Lane; Mercury Montclair; Mercury Monterey; Mercury Commuter; Ford Galaxie; Ford Country Squire

Powertrain
- Engine: 383 cu in (6.3 L) Marauder V8; 430 cu in (7.0 L) Super Marauder V8; 292 cu in (4.8 L) Y-Block V8 V8; 352 cu in (5.8 L) FE V8; 390 cu in (6.4 L) FE V8
- Transmission: 3-speed manual 4-speed manual 3-speed Merc-O-Matic automatic

Dimensions
- Wheelbase: 120.0 in (3,048 mm)
- Length: 214.6 in (5,450 mm)
- Width: 79.9 in (2,030 mm)
- Height: 55.0 in (1,400 mm)
- Curb weight: 4,800–4,900 lb (2,200–2,200 kg)

Following the closure of the Edsel division during the 1960 model year, Ford product planners scrambled to build to a better business case for both Lincoln and Mercury divisions. To decrease its production costs, Mercury ended its use of a division-specific chassis and streamlined its product range, with full-size sedans reduced largely to the Monterey. Mercury station wagon nameplates remained the same, with the Commuter differentiated from the Colony Park by its lack of wood-grain trim and higher level of optional equipment as standard. In following with the compact Mercury Comet, all full-size 1961 Mercury lines began production using Ford bodywork and chassis. Now sharing its roofline with the Ford Country Squire, the Colony Park moved from sharing its interior trim from the Montclair to the Monterey.

Though the 1961 redesign of the Mercury product line was not intended as downsizing, the transition between the model years marked a significant decrease in exterior dimensions. From 1960 to 1961, the Mercury Colony Park shed approximately five inches in length, six inches in wheelbase, and approximately 500 pounds of curb weight. The Colony Park remained the luxury level Mercury vehicle, with many optional items included with the listed retail price of US$3,118 ($33,593 in 2025 dollars) and selling 7,887 examples.

In place of the 430 MEL V8, Mercury fitted the Colony Park with three separate V8 engines. A 292 Y-Block V8 was the standard engine for 1961 and 1962, with 352 and 390 FE V8s as options. In 1963, the 390 became the standard engine. For the first time, 3- and 4-speed manual transmissions were offered in the Colony Park, with the 3-speed Merc-O-Matic as an option.

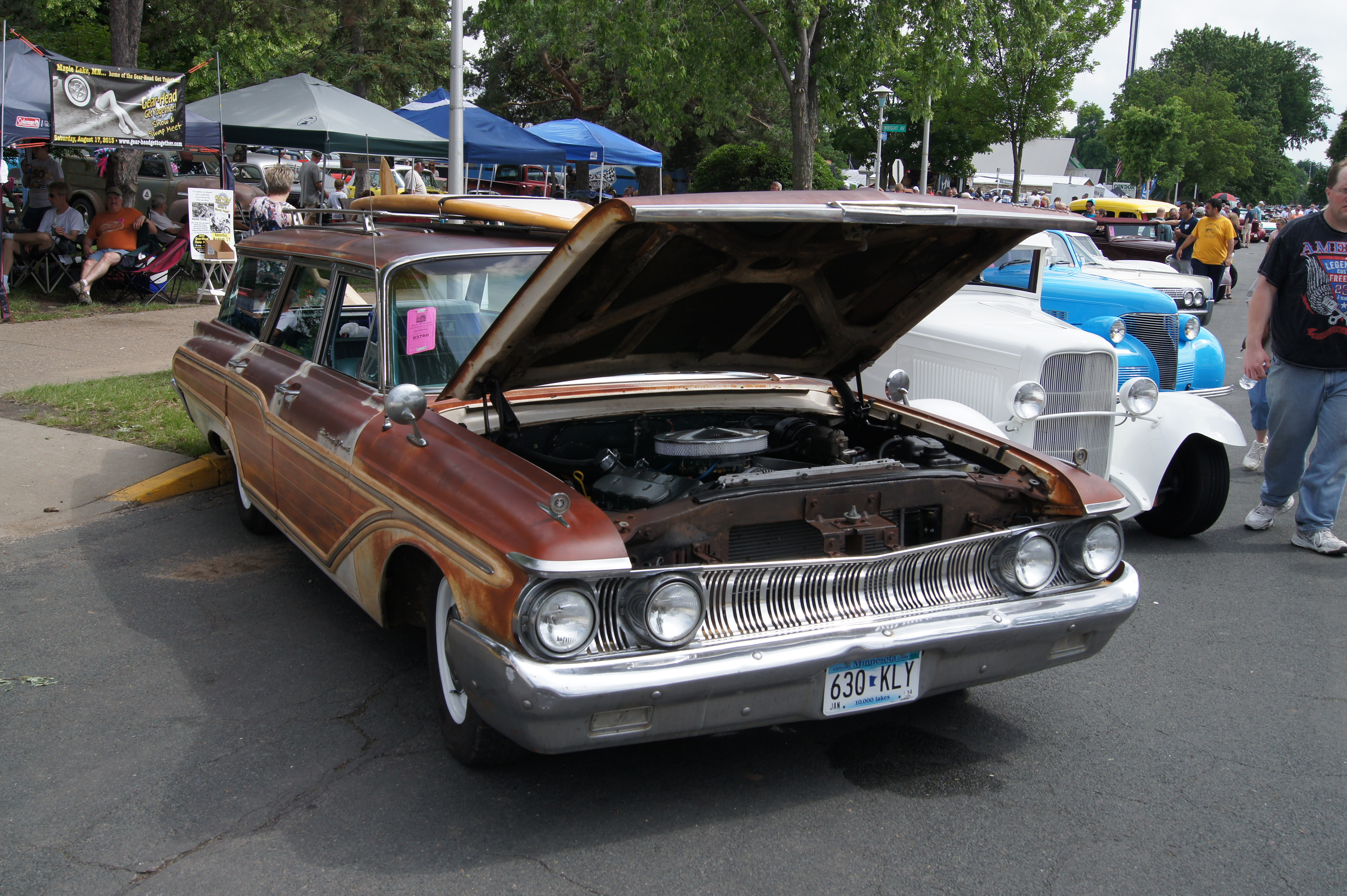
1961 Mercury Country Cruiser Colony Park

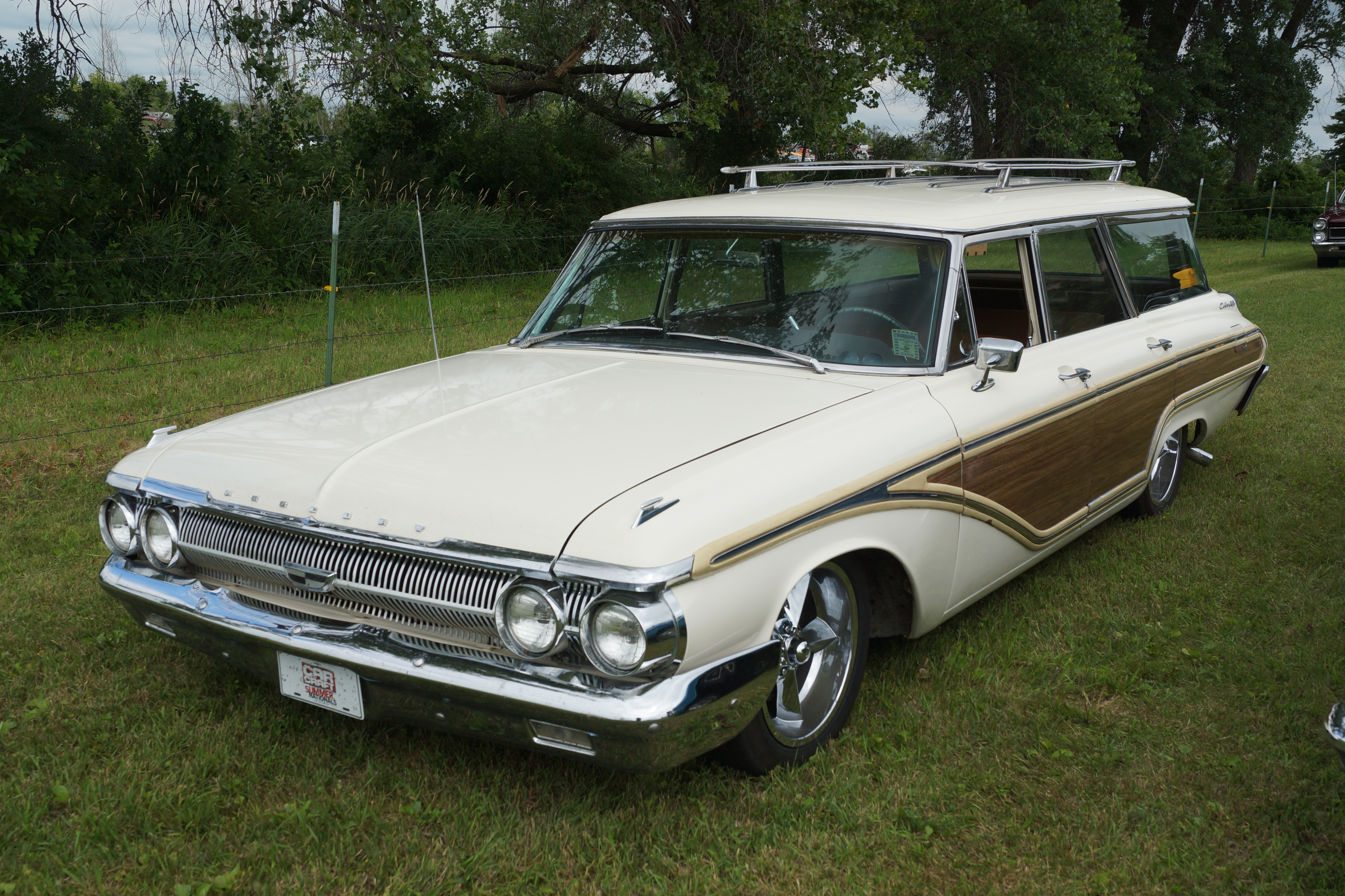
1962 Mercury Monterey Custom Colony Park (with aftermarket wheels)

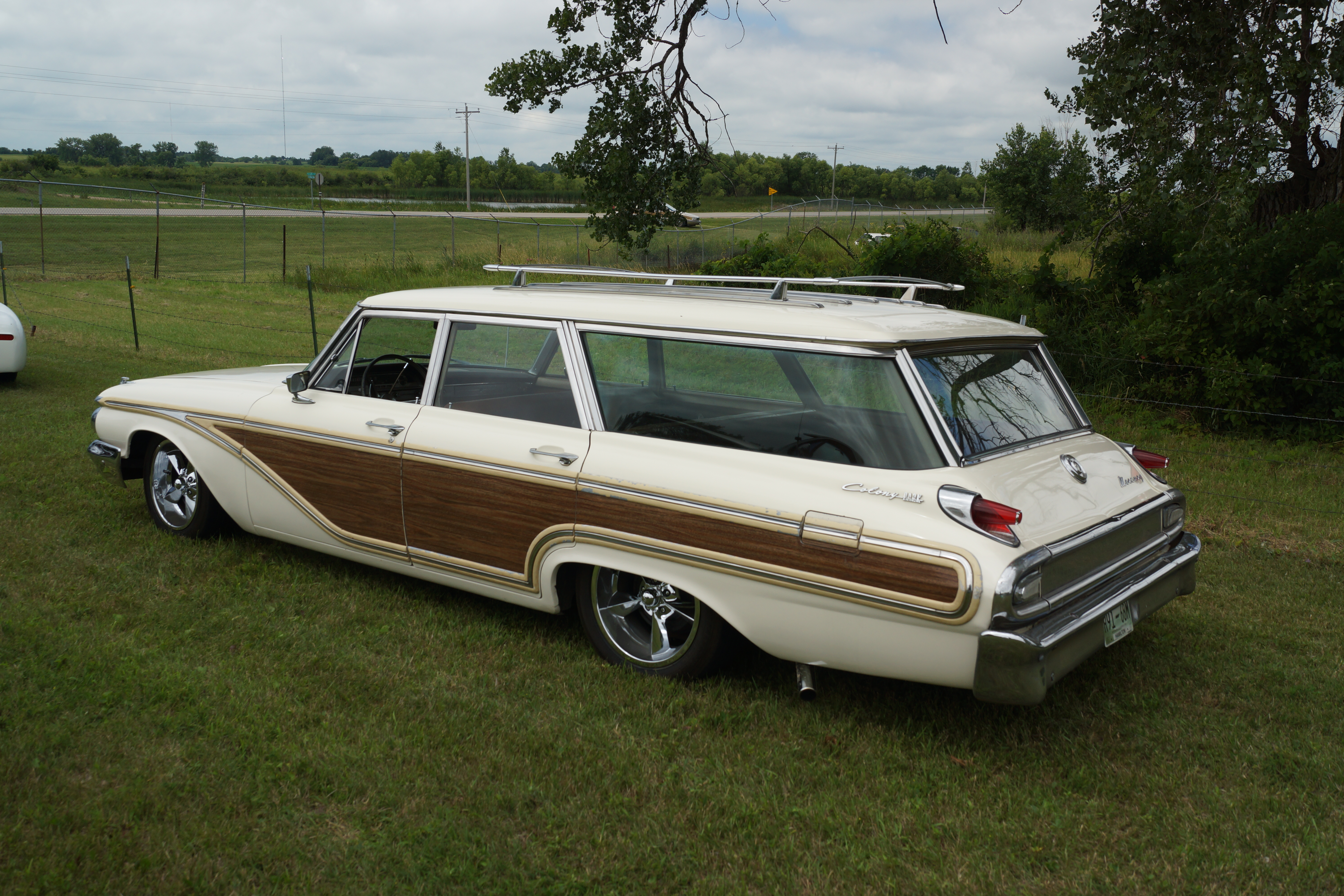
1962 Mercury Monterey Custom Colony Park rear view (with aftermarket wheels)

=== Sales ===
Third-generation Colony Park production (6- and 9 passenger combined)
Year	Sales
1961	7,887
1962	9,596
1963	13,976
1964	9,858

== Fourth generation (1965–1968) ==
Fourth generation
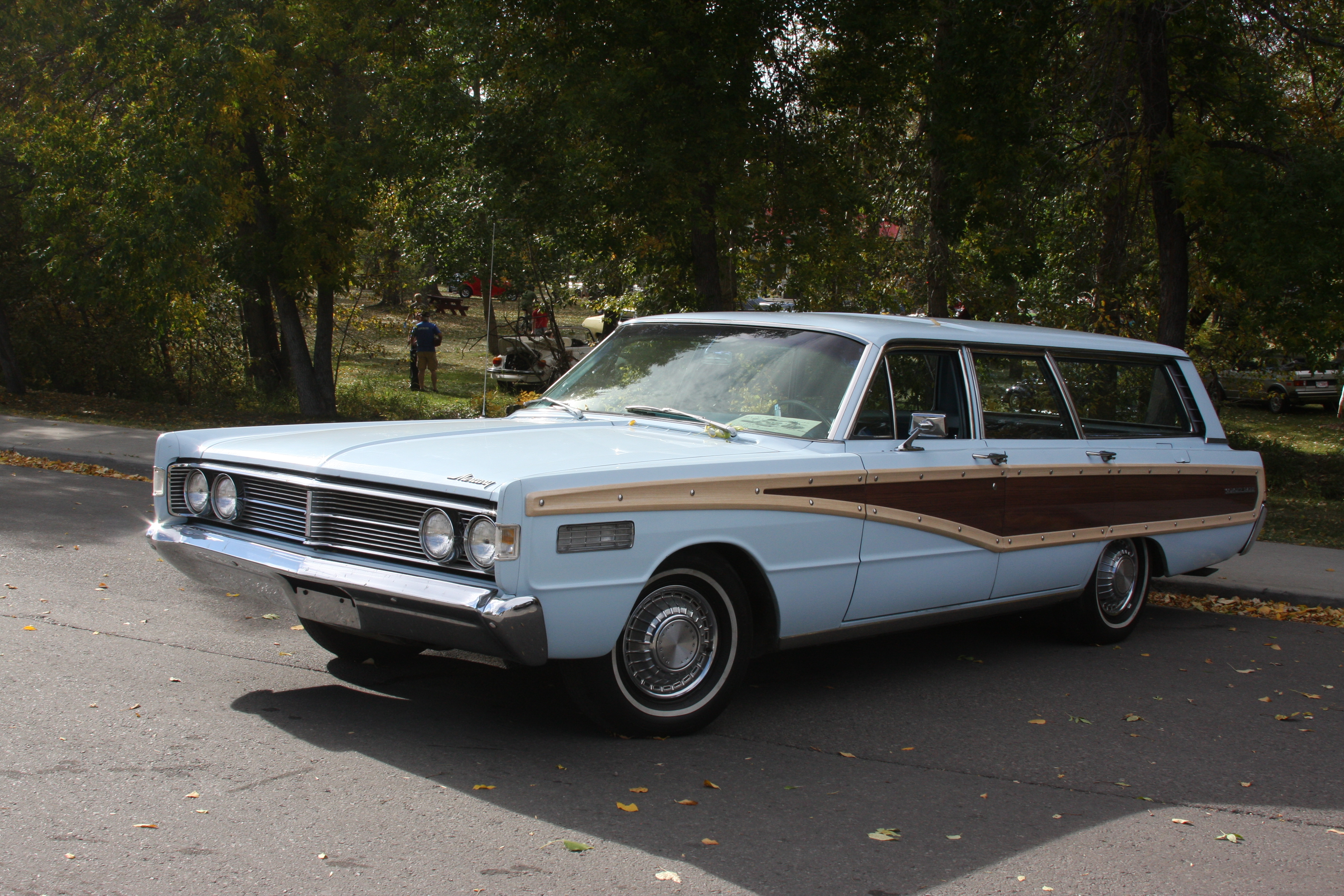
- 1966 Colony Park

Overview
- Model years: 1965–1968

Body and chassis
- Related: Mercury Commuter; Ford Country Squire; Mercury Park Lane; Ford LTD

Powertrain
- Engine: 390 cu in (6.4 L) FE V8; 410 cu in (6.7 L) Marauder V8

Dimensions
- Wheelbase: 119.0 in (3,023 mm)
- Length: 210.0 in (5,330 mm)
- Width: 77.4 in (1,970 mm)
- Curb weight: 4,277 lb (1,940 kg)

For 1965, Ford redesigned its entire full-size sedan and station wagon product line, including the Mercury Colony Park, and was once again separated as its own model line with the mid-level Commuter without the simulated mahogany wood trim. While retaining a body-on-frame chassis, the leaf-spring rear suspension was replaced by a coil-spring live rear axle configuration; through several design changes, the basic layout would be retained through the final Crown Victoria, produced in 2011. While the Colony Park retained its roofline alongside the Ford Country Squire, it adopted the slab-sided design language taken on by Mercury sedans, heavily influenced by the exterior of the Lincoln Continental. The 1965 version was listed at US$3,364 ($39,803 in 2025 dollars) and 4,213 were manufactured.

Through this generation, Mercury would make several design changes. For 1966, the rear tailgate was updated, marking the debut of the two-way "Magic Doorgate" shared with all other Ford and Mercury station wagons; the design allowed the tailgate to fold down as a tailgate as well as swing out to the driver's side as a door. For 1967, passenger capacity was expanded, as sideways-facing third-row seats were added as an option. To increase ventilation for the rear of the vehicle, the Colony Park introduced fresh-air ventilation through channels integrated into the D pillar, allowing ventilation if the rear window was retracted, and when the rear window was up, the airflow would be used to keep the rear window clear in inclement weather.

The Colony Park underwent two exterior revisions, in 1967 and 1968, following Lincoln Continental styling updates; redesigns were made to the simulated wood paneling, where the entire side of the body was covered and eliminated the tapered appearance on the front fender. For 1967 and 1968, the Mercury Park Lane coupe and convertible featured the same simulated wood paneling as the Colony Park as an option package. Called "yacht deck paneling" by Mercury, the option was rarely ordered and was discontinued as the Park Lane was replaced by the Mercury Marquis.

For 1965, the 390 V8 was the sole engine. In 1966, Mercury added two additional FE V8s, a 330 hp 410 "Marauder" V8 and a 345 hp 428 "Super Marauder" V8. For 1968, the 410 was dropped, replaced by a 315 hp version of the 390 V8.

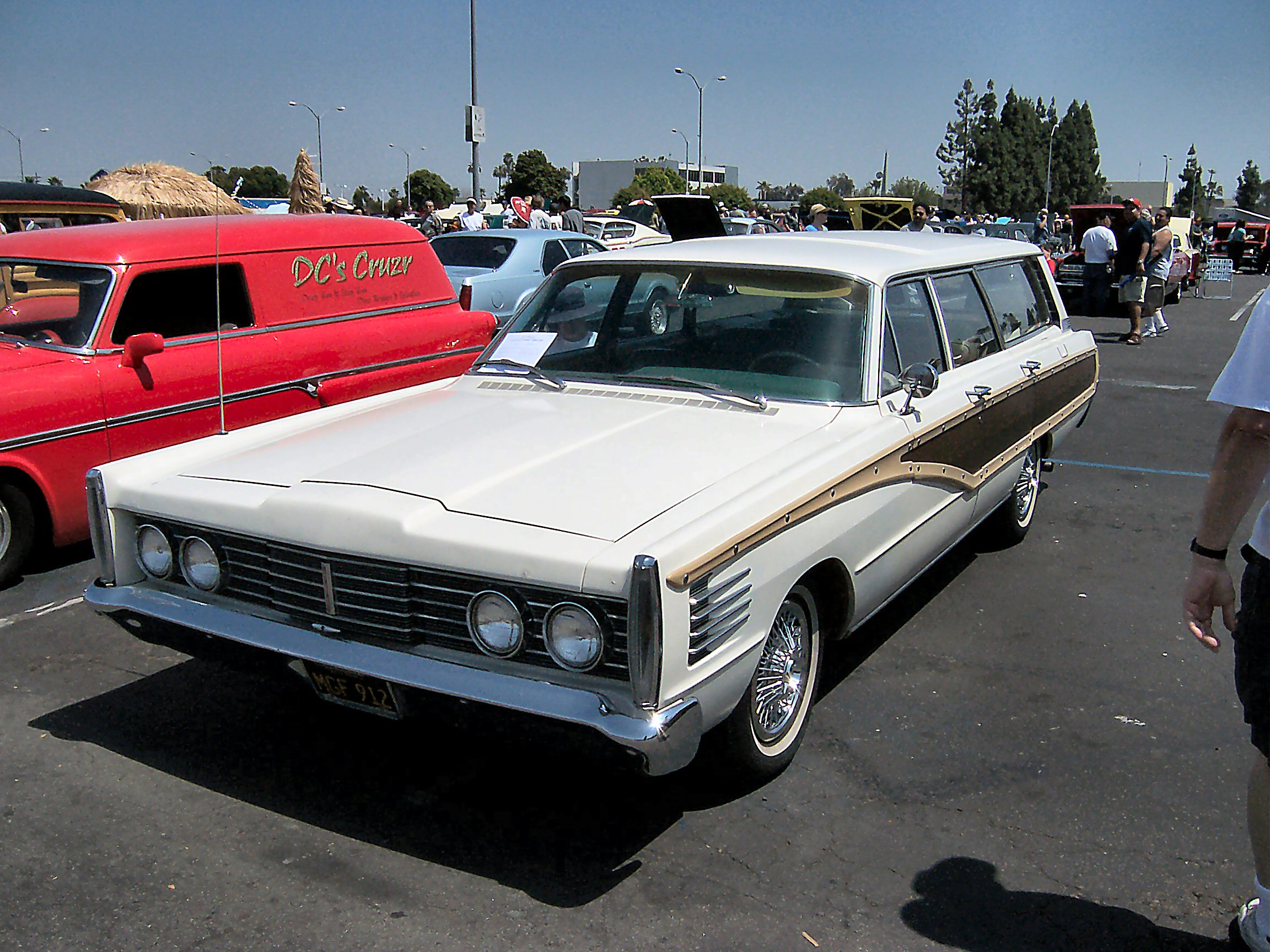
1965 Mercury Colony Park (with non-standard wheel covers)

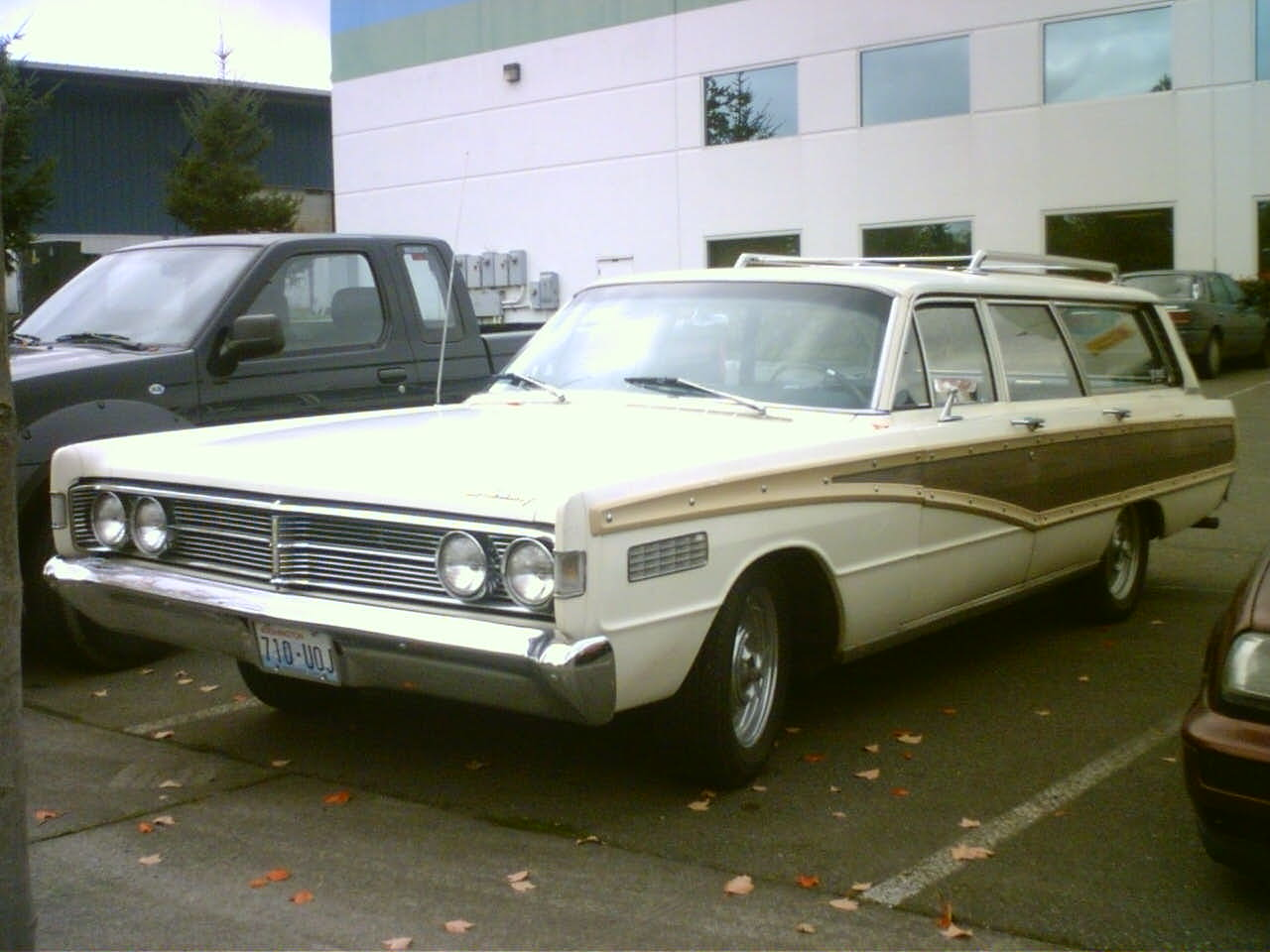
1966 Colony Park

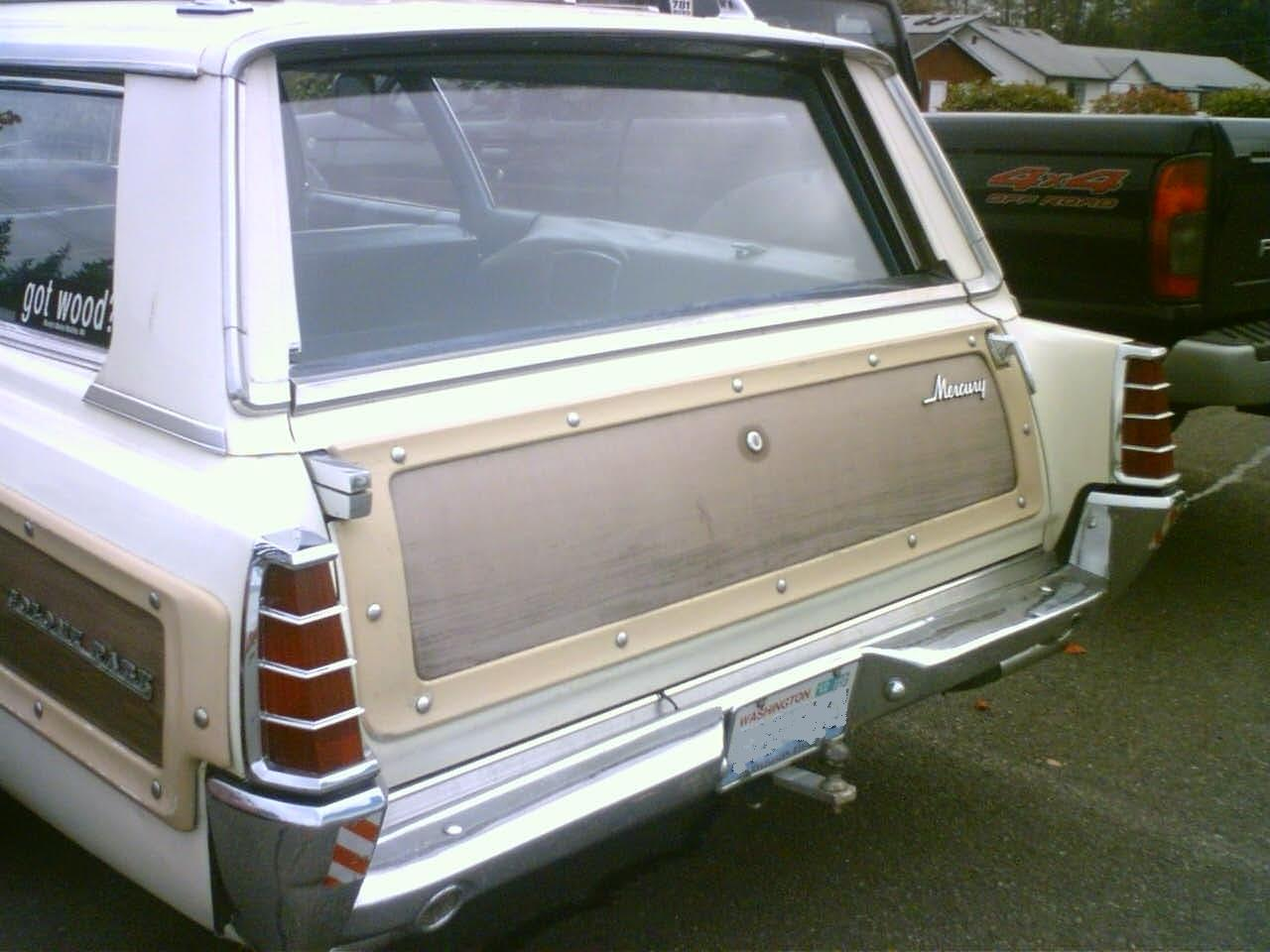
1966 2-way tailgate with side-swing door handle

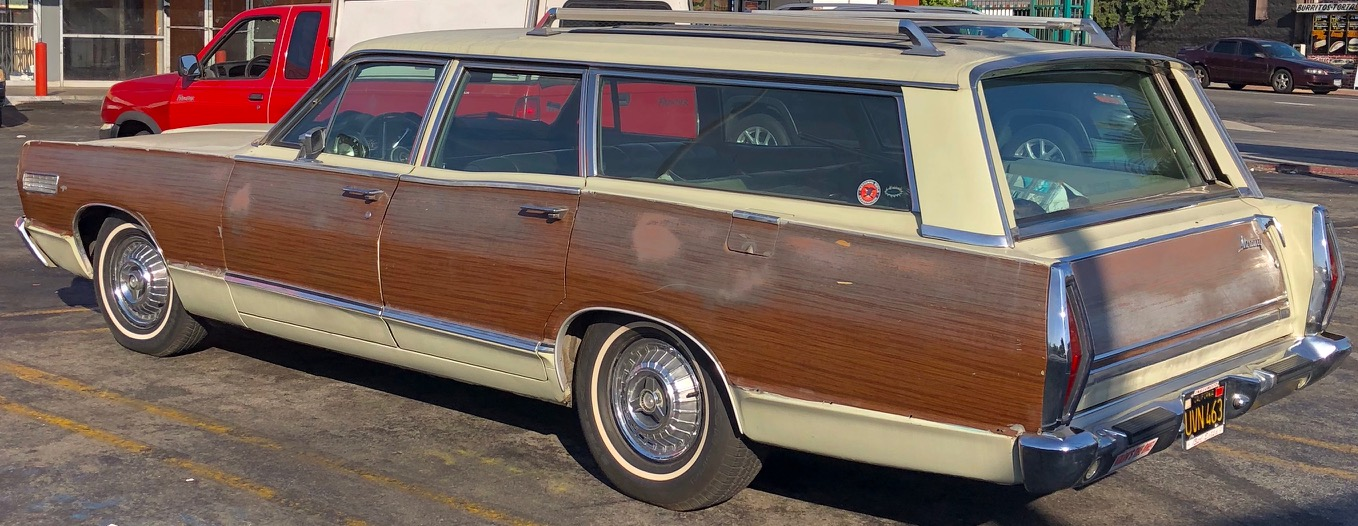
1967 Colony Park

=== Sales ===
Fourth-generation Colony Park production (6- and 10 passenger combined)
Year	Sales
1965	15,294
1966	18,894
1967	24,578
1968	21,179

== Fifth generation (1969–1978) ==
Fifth generation
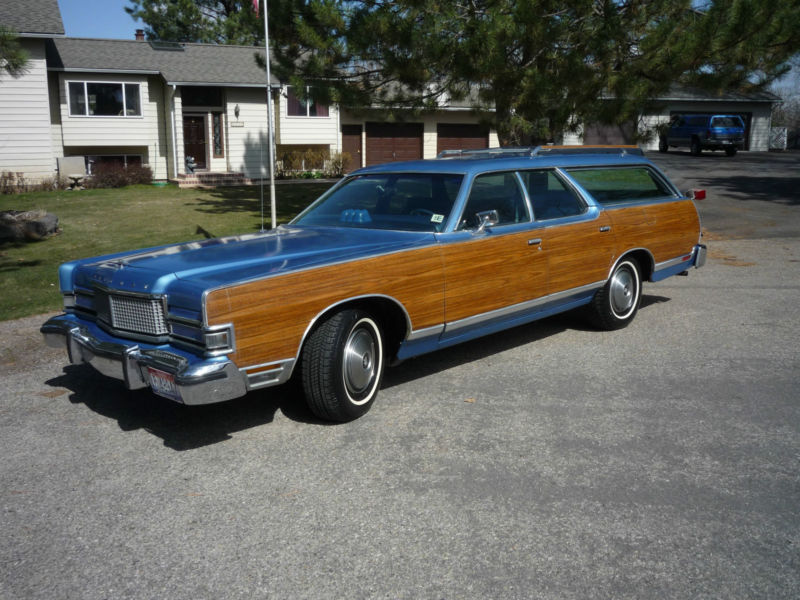
- 1974 Mercury Marquis Colony Park

Overview
- Production: September 1968–October 1978
- Model years: 1969–1978
- Assembly: Hazelwood, Missouri (St. Louis Assembly Plant); Pico Rivera, California (Los Angeles Assembly); Hapeville, Georgia (Atlanta Assembly)

Body and chassis
- Layout: FR layout
- Related: Ford LTD; Ford Country Squire; Ford Galaxie; Mercury Monterey; Mercury Grand Marquis; Mercury Marquis

Powertrain
- Engine: 351 cu in (5.8 L) 351M V8; 400 cu in (6.6 L) Cleveland V8; 429 cu in (7.0 L) 385 V8; 460 cu in (7.5 L) 385 V8

Dimensions
- Wheelbase: 121.0 in (3,073 mm)
- Length: 220.5 in (5,601 mm)
- Width: 81.1 in (2,060 mm)
- Curb weight: 4,740 lb (2,150 kg)

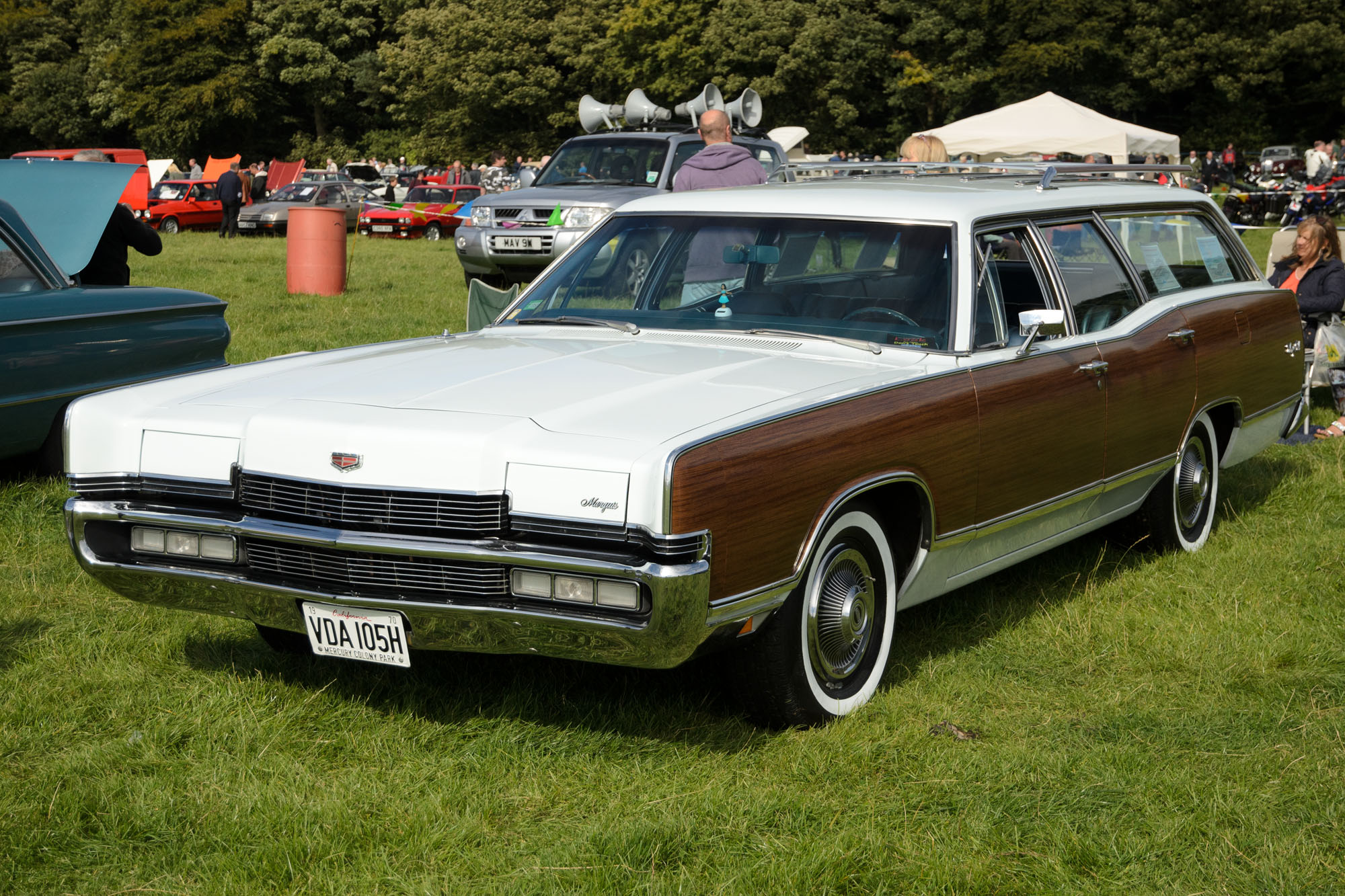
1970 Mercury Marquis Colony Park

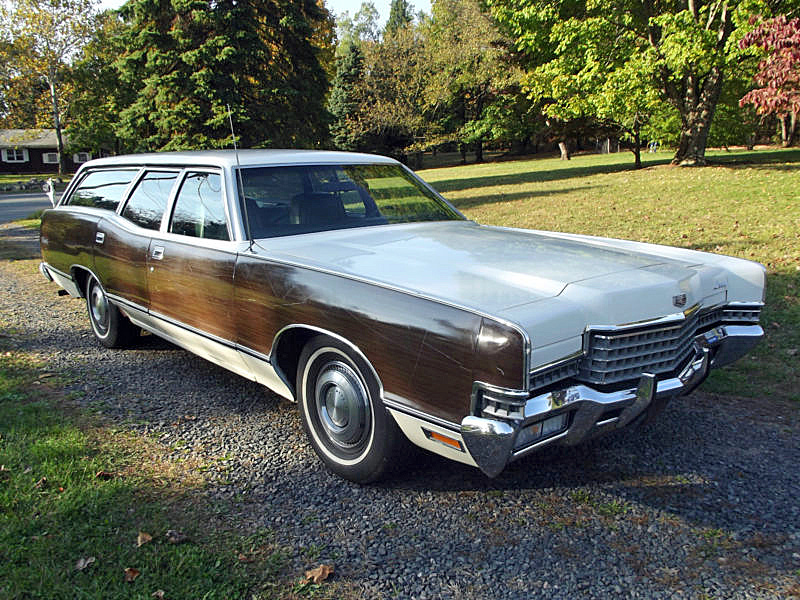
1972 Mercury Marquis Colony Park

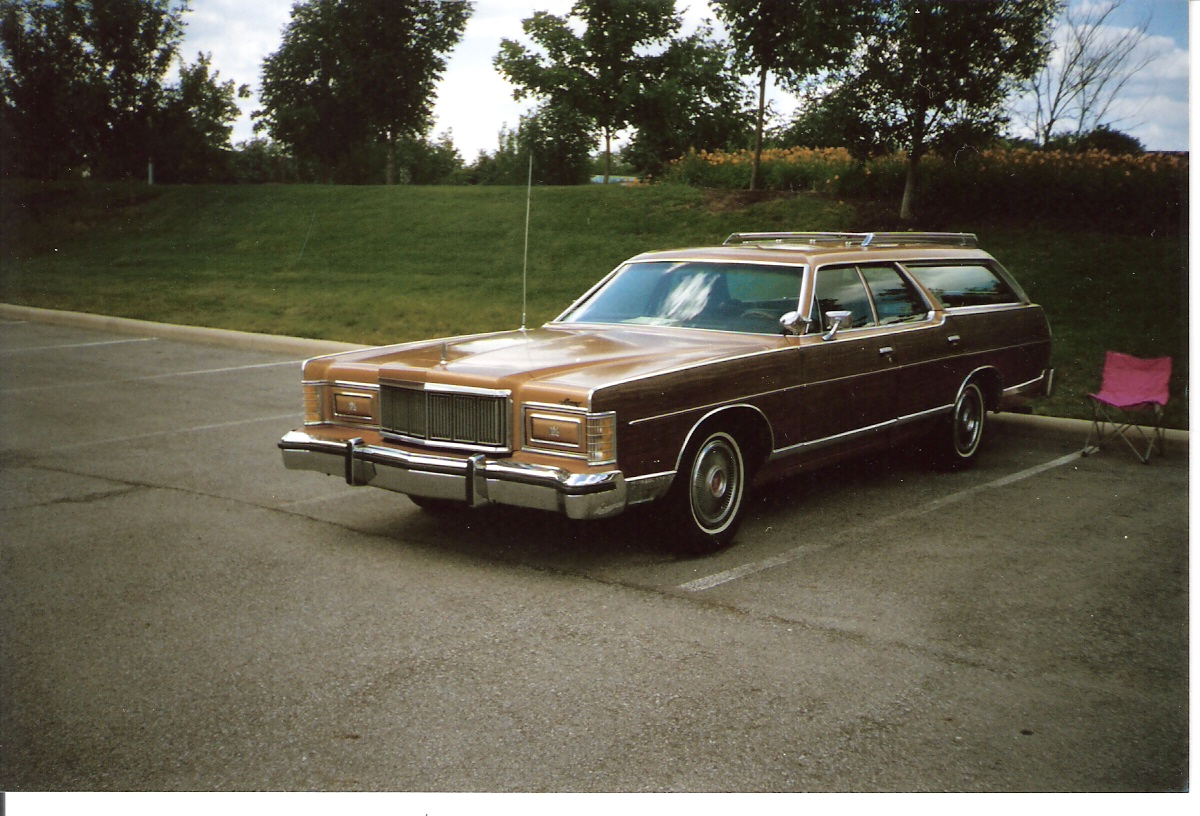
1976 Mercury Marquis Colony Park

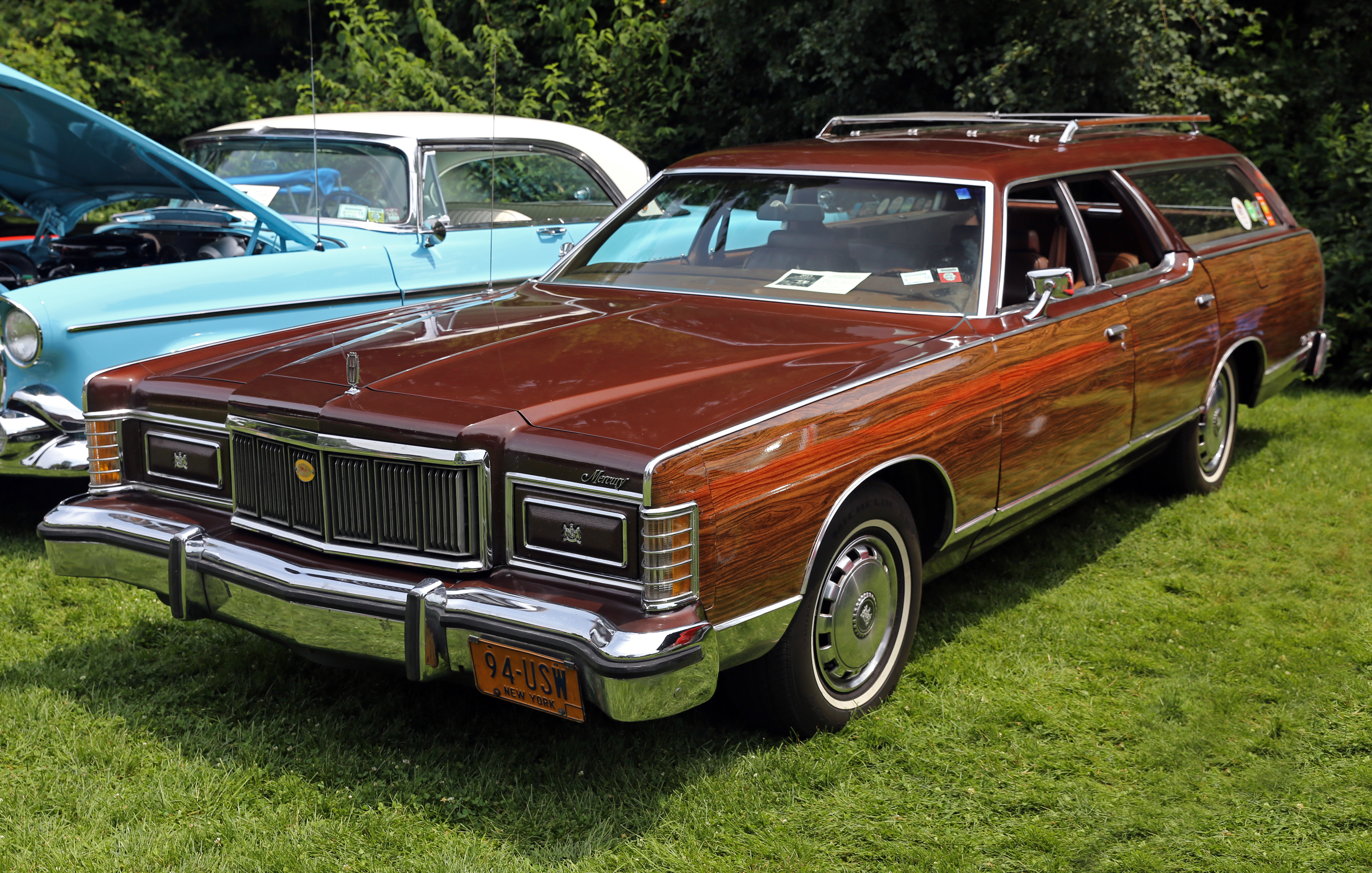
1978 Mercury Marquis Colony Park

Alongside a redesign for the 1969 model year, Ford integrated its station wagon product lines of both Ford and Mercury brands within the nameplates of their sedan counterparts. For the Colony Park, this change made it part of the Mercury Marquis model line. In contrast to the Marquis sedan, the Colony Park was based on the 121.0 in (3,073 mm) wheelbase of the Ford Country Squire and the Ford LTD, and only the Colony Park had concealed headlight covers and the simulated woodgrain body panels, while the Monterey station wagon, which was very similar, did not. This was done to position the Colony Park and Marquis as visually similar to the 1969 Lincoln Continental and the Mark III. The 1969 Colony Park was listed at US$4,457 ($39,130 in 2025 dollars) and 25,604 were made. The Colony Park and Monterey station wagons were the senior level vehicles to the slightly shorter Mercury Montego station wagons, which did also offer the simulated woodgrain appearance.

This generation introduced covered headlights, which were deployed using a vacuum canister system that kept the doors down when a vacuum condition existed in the lines, provided by the engine when it was running. If a loss of vacuum occurred, the doors would retract up so that the headlights were usable if the system should fail. The Magic Doorgate was reworked so that it could swing outward like a conventional door without having to roll the window down, while the glass had to be retracted when opened downwards as a tailgate.

Coinciding with the addition of 5-mph bumpers, Ford and Mercury station wagons underwent a major redesign for 1973, including a completely new roofline. In place of the framed doors, the station wagons were marketed as "pillarless hardtops"; though the roof was fitted with slim B-pillars, the doors were fitted with frameless door glass, a revival of an appearance offered from 1957 to 1960.

Although slightly narrower than the 1959–1960 generation by 0.4 in (10.2 mm), this generation of the Colony Park would be the longest and heaviest station wagon ever sold by Mercury. Due to its nearly 5,000 lb (2,300 kg) curb weight, the standard engine was a 400 cubic-inch V8 with a 429 cubic-inch V8 as an option; in 1972, the 429 was replaced by a 460 cubic-inch V8 sourced from Lincoln. For the 1978 model year, a 351 Windsor V8 became standard (outside of California and high-altitude areas), with the 400 and 460 as options. However, most surviving examples are equipped with one of the two larger V8 engines, as they were far more popular, with the 351 proving to have little fuel-economy gains.

Approximately 7,850,000 full-size Fords and Mercurys were sold over 1969–1978. This makes it the second-best selling Ford automobile platform after the Ford Model T.

=== Sales ===
Fifth-generation Colony Park production (6- and 10 passenger combined)
Year	Sales
1969	25,604
1970	19,204
1971	20,004
1972	20,192
1973	25,747
1974	11,913
1975	13,556
1976	15,114
1977	20,363
1978	16,883

== Sixth generation (1979–1991) ==
Sixth generation
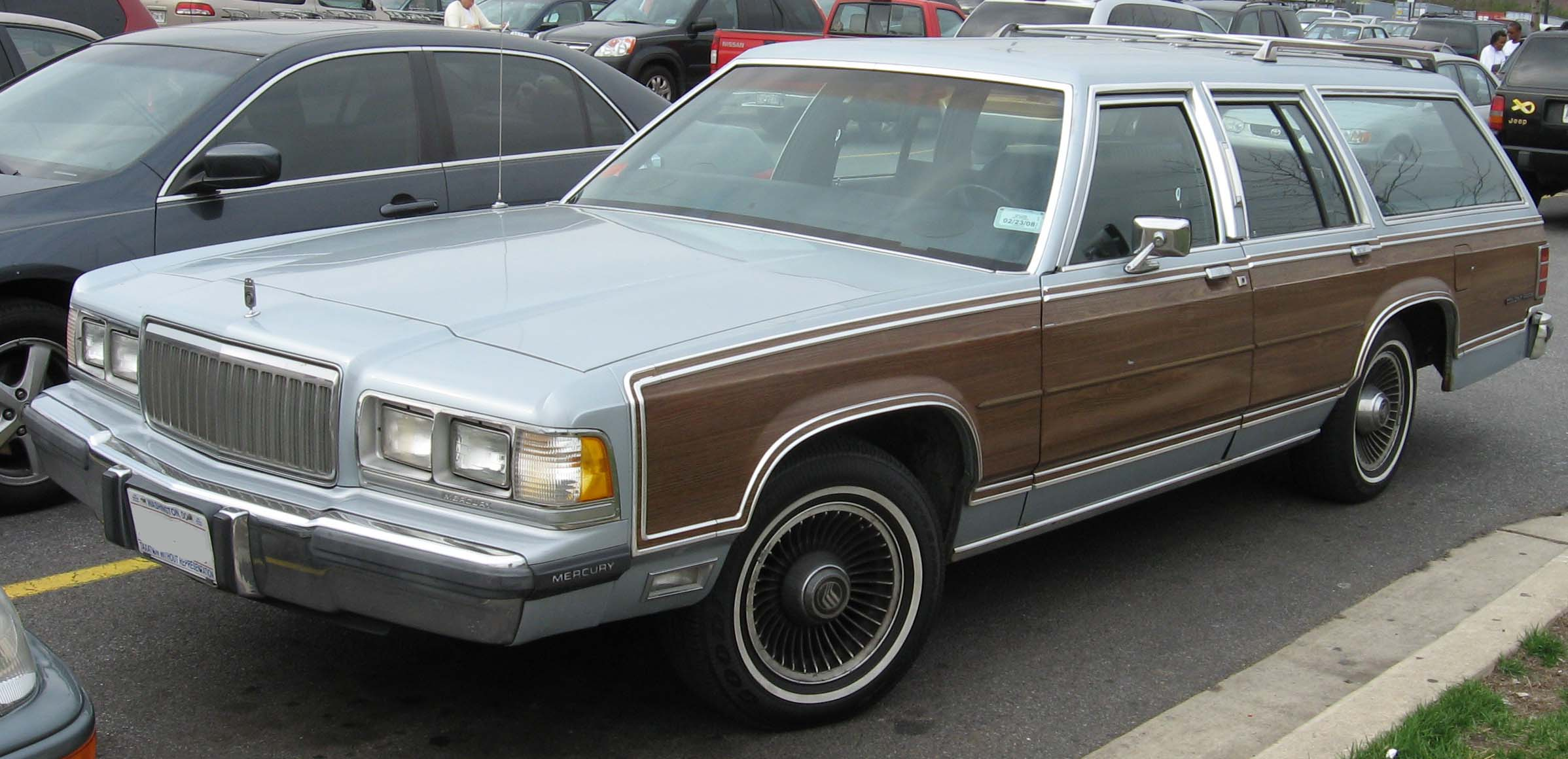
- 1989 Mercury Colony Park

Overview
- Production: October 1978–December 1990
- Model years: 1979–1991
- Assembly: Hazelwood, Missouri (St. Louis Assembly); Talbotville, Canada (St. Thomas Assembly)

Body and chassis
- Platform: Ford Panther platform
- Related: Ford LTD; Ford Country Squire; Ford LTD Crown Victoria; Mercury Grand Marquis; Mercury Marquis

Powertrain
- Engine: 302 cu in (4.9 L) 5.0 Windsor V8; 351 cu in (5.8 L) Windsor V8
- Transmission: 3-speed C4 automatic 3-speed FMX automatic 4-speed AOD automatic

Dimensions
- Wheelbase: 114.3 in (2,903 mm)
- Length: 219 in (5,563 mm)
- Width: 79.3 in (2,014 mm)
- Height: 56.5 in (1,435 mm)
- Curb weight: 4,032 lb (1,829 kg)

For 1979, Ford redesigned its full-size sedan and station wagons; the Ford Panther platform brought Ford in line with the downsizing introduced by the 1977 General Motors B-body full-size cars. To remain competitive (in terms of size and fuel economy) with the Buick Estate and Oldsmobile Custom Cruiser (1978 marked the end of the full-size Chrysler Town & Country station wagon), Ford made extensive changes to its full-size station wagons. In terms of size, the 1979 Colony Park shed over 11 inches in length, 6.6 inches in wheelbase, 0.4 inches in width, and had lost slightly over 1,000 lbs in weight (in comparison to its 1978 predecessor). Though technically smaller than the "intermediate" Montego/Cougar station wagon, the Colony Park reduced its cargo-carrying capability only slightly over the 1978 Colony Park. As before, 8-passenger seating remained standard equipment.

In a revision of the Mercury product range, the Colony Park was moved to the Grand Marquis model line, the flagship of the Mercury brand. Effectively, it placed the Colony Park above its Country Squire counterpart in terms of trim; as well, this decision cleared room for a Marquis station wagon without woodgrain trim.

In the interest of fuel economy, the Mercury Colony Park underwent an extensive revision of its powertrain lineup. Although V8 power remained in place, the 400 and 460 V8 engines were removed from all Ford cars, with the Colony Park sharing the 302 Windsor V8 with the Mercury Monarch; the previous base 351 Windsor V8 was offered as an option. For 1981, Ford and Mercury underwent the powertrain revisions of the 1980 Lincoln Continental. The 302 V8 was given fuel injection (now marketed in metric as a "5.0 L"), with both engines paired to the 4-speed AOD overdrive transmission, the first of its type in an American full-size car. For 1982, the fuel-injected "5.0" V8 became the sole engine offering in all Mercury full-size cars. During 1986, the carbureted 5.8 L V8 returned as an option; examples specified with this engine are rare.

This generation of Colony Park would see few substantial changes during its thirteen-year lifespan. For 1983, it became the sole full-size Mercury wagon, as the previous year's 'base' Marquis wagon was no longer offered as a full-size model. For 1984, the non-woodgrain Grand Marquis (previously Marquis) station wagon was dropped, leaving the Colony Park as the sole version. For 1987, Mercury brought the Colony Park in line with the Sable and Topaz by introducing GS and LS trim levels.

After nine years with only detail changes to the body and trim, the Colony Park received a major update alongside the Grand Marquis for 1988. From the windshield forward, a more aerodynamic front end better integrated the fenders, grille, headlights, and bumpers. Inside, the front seats were modernized. For 1990, as part of an addition of a driver's side airbag, the entire instrument panel and dashboard received a redesign; all outboard seats received 3-point seatbelts. 1991 was the final shortened model year for the Colony Park, with production ending in December 1990.

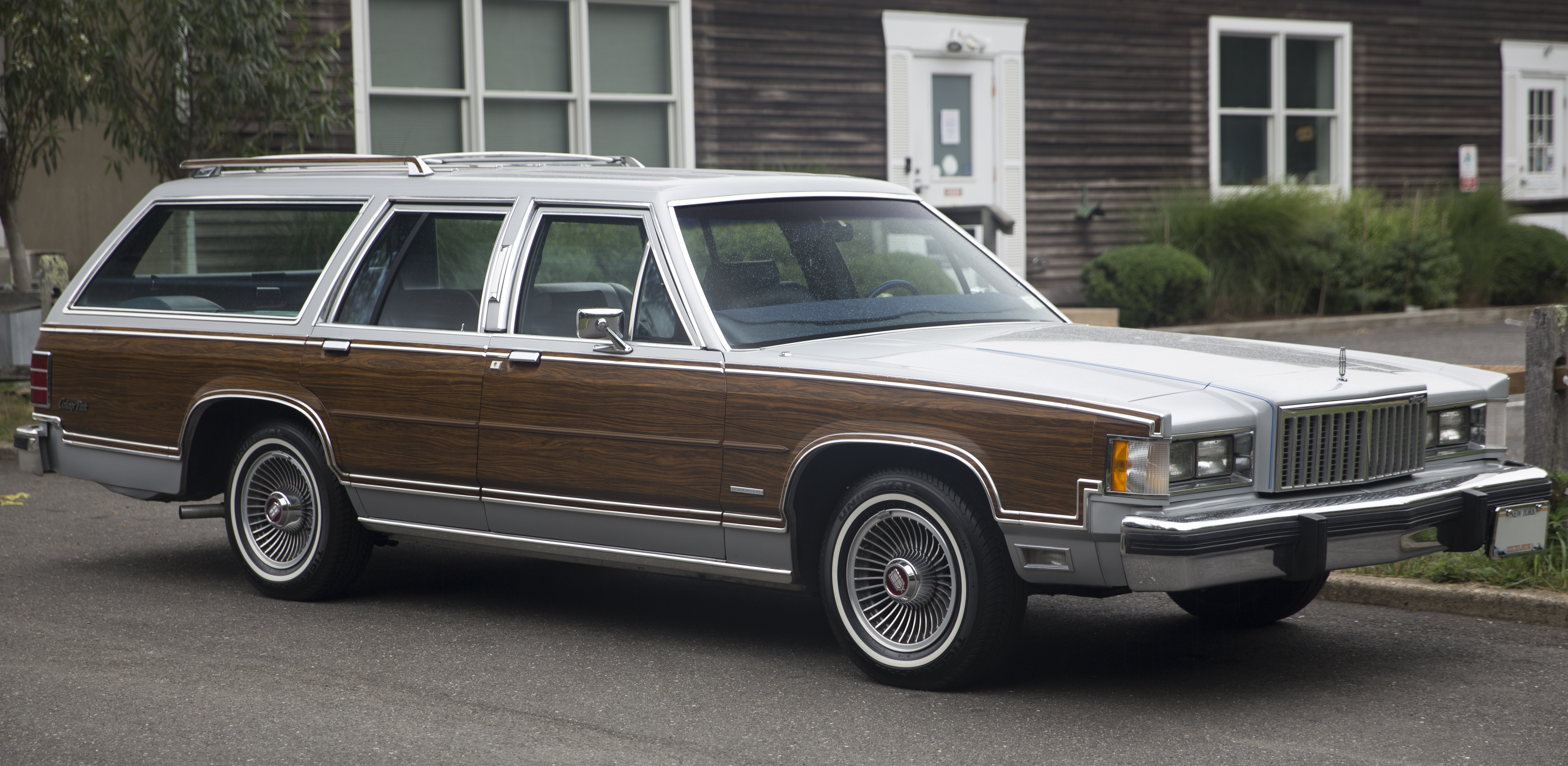
1979–1987 Mercury Colony Park (1983; front view)

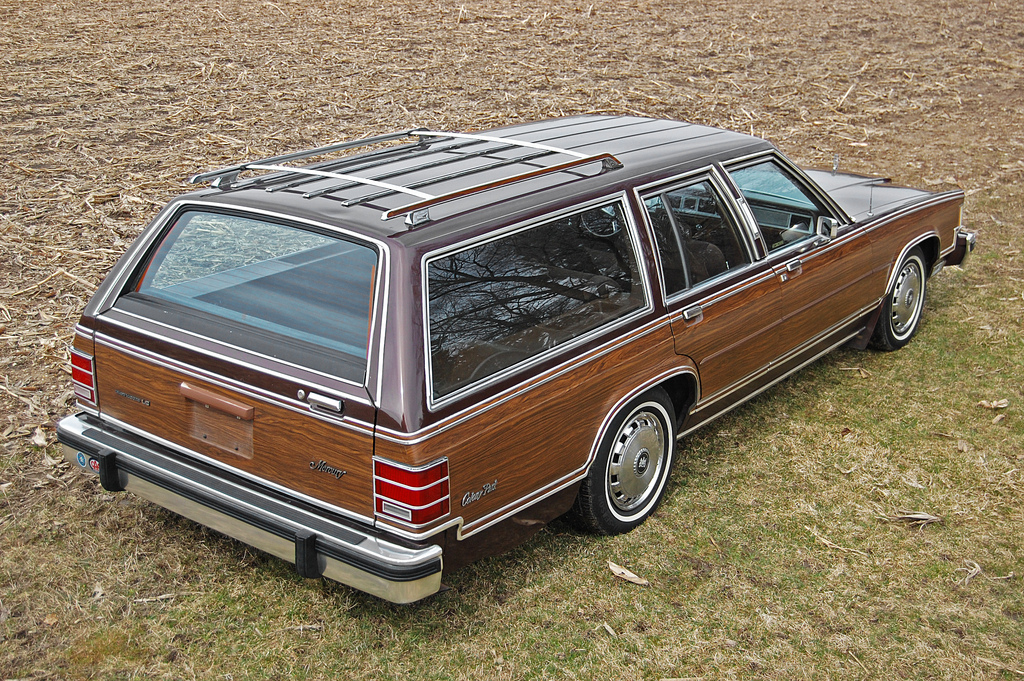
1984 Mercury Colony Park; rear

1979-1991 production figures
Year	1979	1980	1981	1982	1983	1984	1985	1986	1987	1988	1989	1990	1991	Total production
Units	13,758	5,781	6,293	8,004	12,394	17,421	14,119	9,891	10,691	9,456	8,665	4,450	3,104	124,027
