= Mercury Voyager =

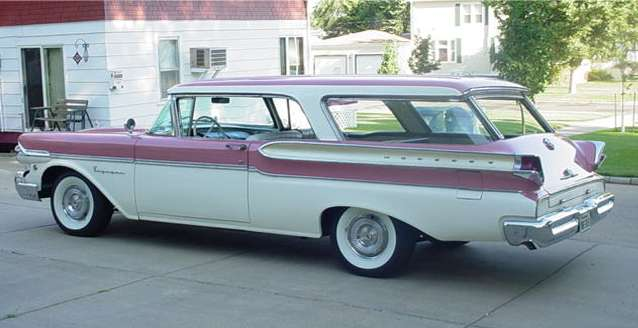
- 1957 Mercury Voyager 2-door wagon, rear

Overview
- Manufacturer: Mercury (Ford)
- Model years: 1957-1958

Body and chassis
- Class: Full-size
- Body style: 3-door hardtop station wagon; 5-door hardtop station wagon
- Layout: FR layout
- Platform: 1957 Mercury
- Chassis: body-on-frame
- Related: Mercury Monterey; Mercury Montclair; Mercury Turnpike Cruiser; Mercury Commuter; Mercury Colony Park

Powertrain
- Engine: 312 cu in (5.1 L) Ford Y-block V8; 368 cu in (6.0 L) Lincoln Y-Block V8; 383 cu in (6.3 L) MEL V8; 430 cu in (7.0 L) MEL V8
- Transmission: 3-speed Merc-o-Matic automatic

Dimensions
- Wheelbase: 122 in (3,099 mm)
- Length: 212.3 in (5,392 mm) (1957); 214.2 in (5,441 mm) (1958)
- Width: 79.1 in (2,009 mm)
- Height: 58.3 in (1,481 mm)

The Mercury Voyager is a station wagon that was sold by the Mercury division of Ford for the 1957 and 1958 model years. For the 1957 model year, Mercury created a model range of station wagons distinct from sedans, following Ford (and later Edsel). The Voyager served as the mid-range offering, slotted above the base-trim Mercury Commuter, with the woodgrained Colony Park serving as the top-range offering.

For the 1959 model year, Ford consolidated the station wagon nameplates of its non-Lincoln divisions, with the Voyager combined into the "Country Cruiser" series while the Ford Del Rio, Edsel Roundup, and Edsel Bermuda were discontinued.

== Design overview ==
Following the 1956 introduction of the hardtop station wagon by Rambler, in 1957, Mercury became the first American manufacturer to produce its entire station wagon line in a hardtop bodystyle. Serving as the mid-range Mercury station wagon, the Voyager was trimmed between the Mercury Monterey and Mercury Montclair sedans.

=== Chassis ===
As with the Commuter, Colony Park, and Mercury sedans of the time, the 1957-1958 Mercury Voyager was constructed using a body-on-frame chassis. Sharing its chassis with the rest of the Mercury range, the Voyager is built on a 122-inch wheelbase.

During its production, the Voyager was offered exclusively with V8 engines. For 1957, the standard engine was a 312 cubic-inch "Safety-Surge" V8, producing 255 hp, with a 368 cubic-inch "Turnpike Cruiser" V8 producing 290 hp as an option. For 1958, Mercury revised its engine offerings, introducing the MEL-series V8. A 383 cubic-inch "Marauder" V8 producing 330 hp, was standard for the Voyager, with a 430 cubic-inch "Super Marauder" V8 was an option, producing 400 hp. The Super Marauder V8 was notable for becoming the first American mass-produced engine to reach an output of 400 hp.

For all four V8 engines, a 3-speed "Merc-O-Matic" automatic transmission was used. For 1957, Mercury offered mechanically activated pushbutton transmission controls in response to the Chrysler TorqueFlite pushbutton controls introduced in 1956. The Mercury control buttons initially offered five buttons and was called "Keyboard Control", with a long button on top labeled "Drive" with four smaller buttons below labeled "Brake", "Neutral Start" which would allow the engine to start with the ignition key, "Hill Control" and "Reverse" with later versions separating the "Drive" button to "Performance" and "Cruising" for 1958 and relabeled as "Multi-Drive". A separate push/pull lever was included below the control buttons labeled "Park" which would lock out the control buttons until the Park button was pulled to release it. The control panel was installed to the left of the steering wheel. In 1959 the keyboard control was discontinued and used a steering column gear selector lever.

=== Body design ===
During its production, the Voyager was offered in two body configurations: two-door and four-door. Produced solely as a pillarless hardtop, a forward-facing third-row seat was offered on four-door Voyagers, expanding seating capacity from six to nine. In a design that would be modified on later Ford/Mercury station wagons, the rear window retracts electrically into the tailgate, which folds flat against the load floor.

For 1958, the exterior underwent a minor revision. Along with the standardization of quad headlamps, more conservative front styling was added. While the revision was centered around an effort to better integrate the grille and front bumper, the "pie-wedge" taillamps were replaced by a "rocket-style" design, along with additional chrome trim on the C-pillar.

Due to the two-door only selling just over 7,600 units in 1957-58, the two-door was dropped from the 1959 model range.

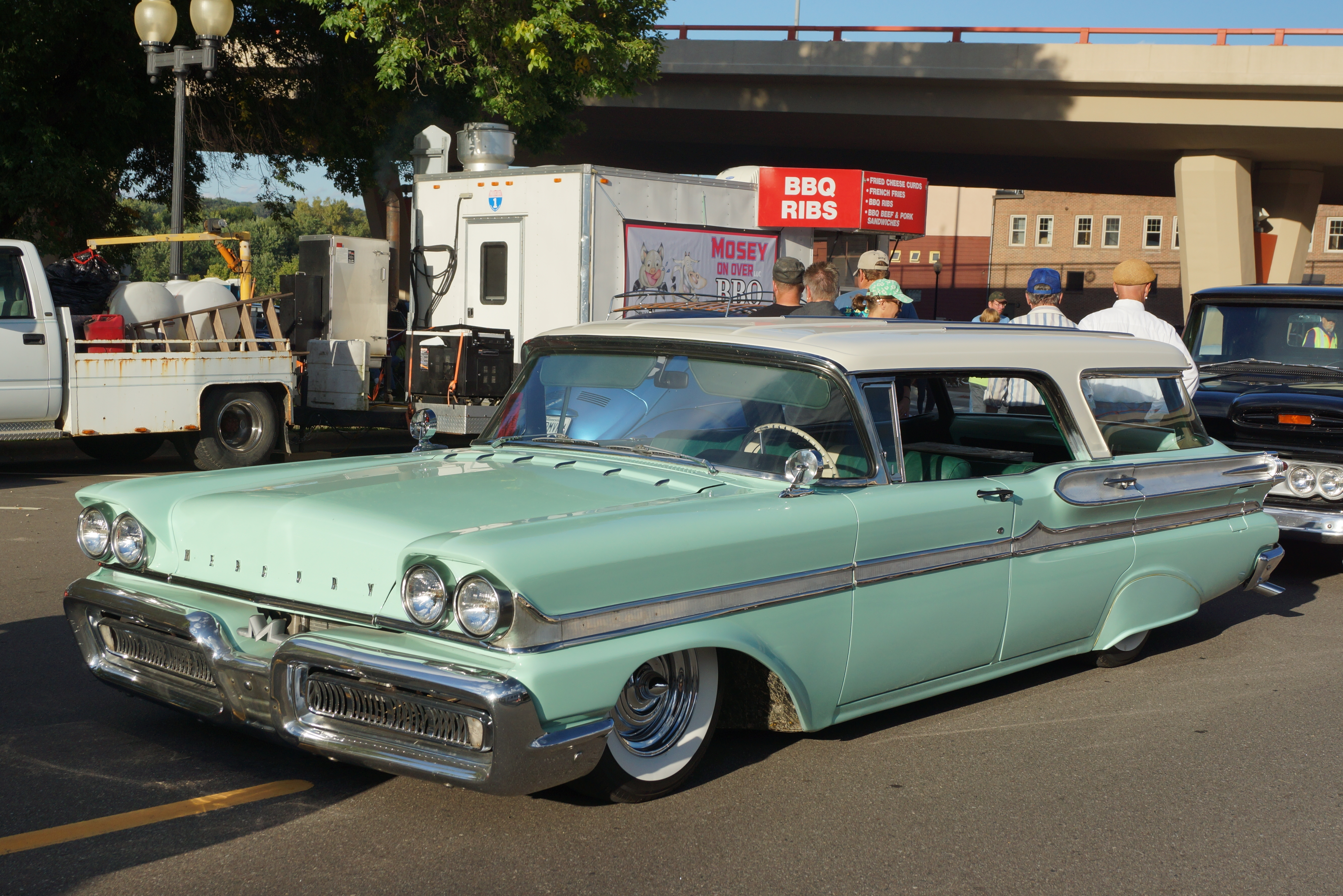
1958 Mercury Voyager (street rod)

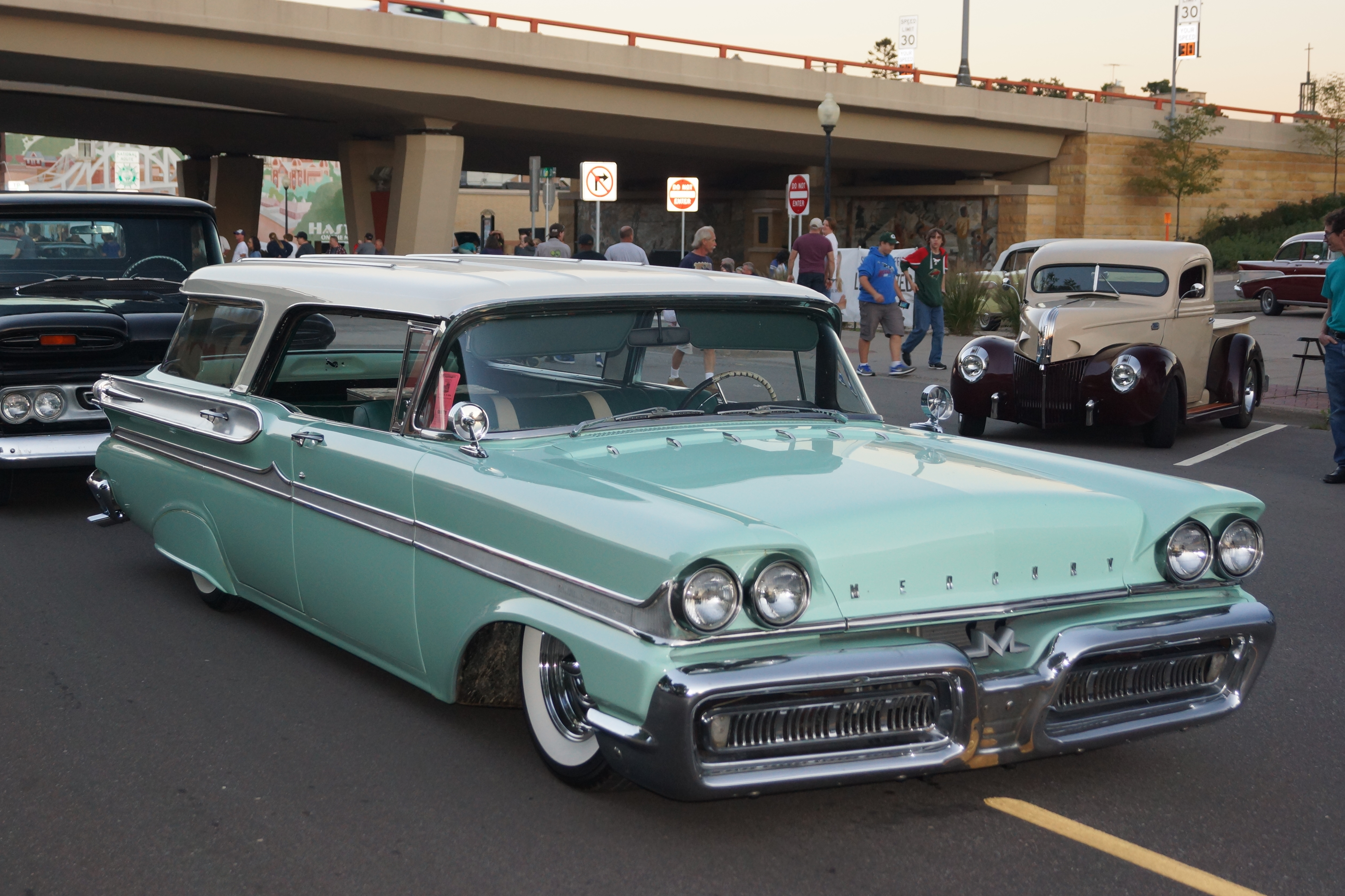
1958 Mercury Voyager (street rod)

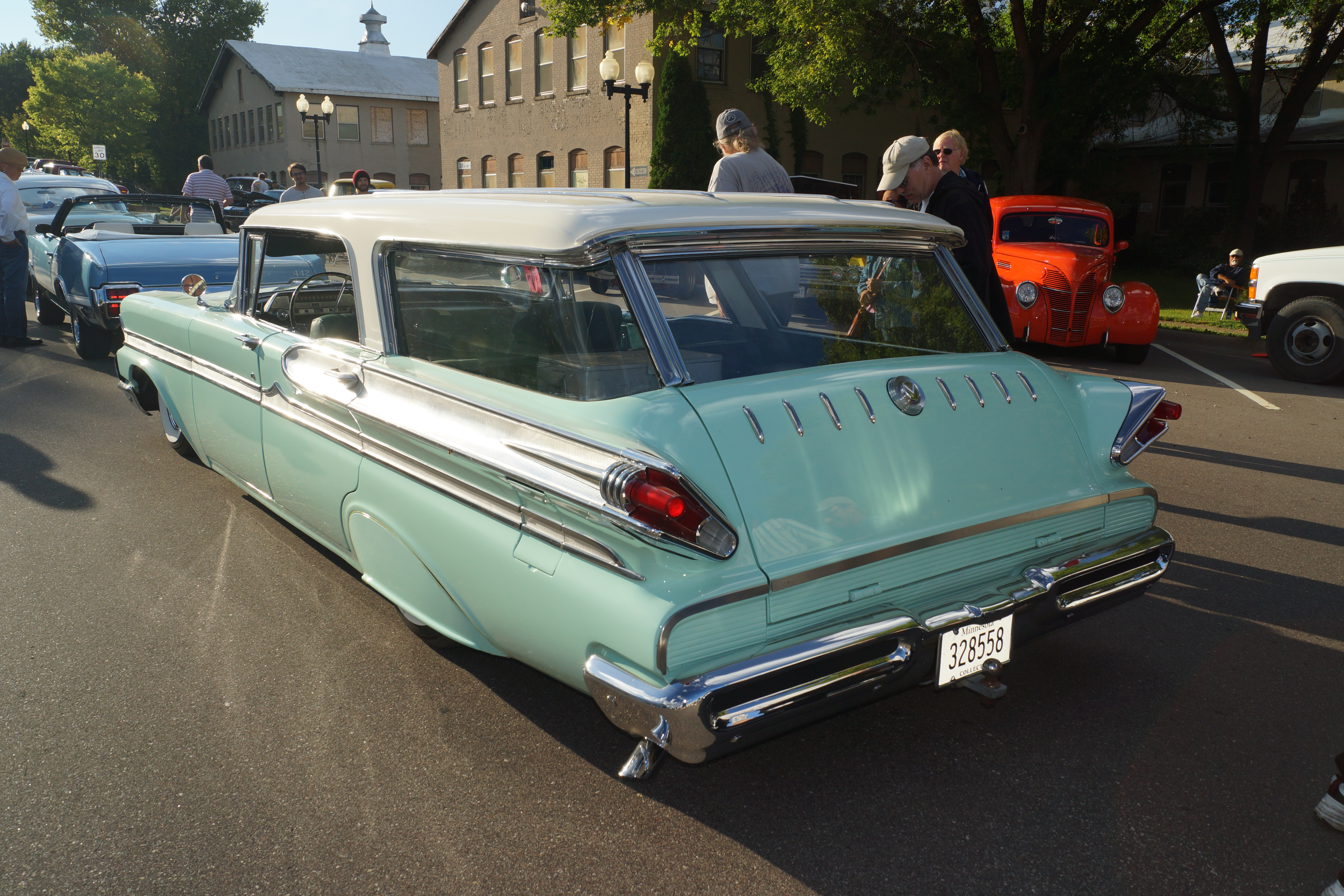
1958 Mercury Voyager, rear

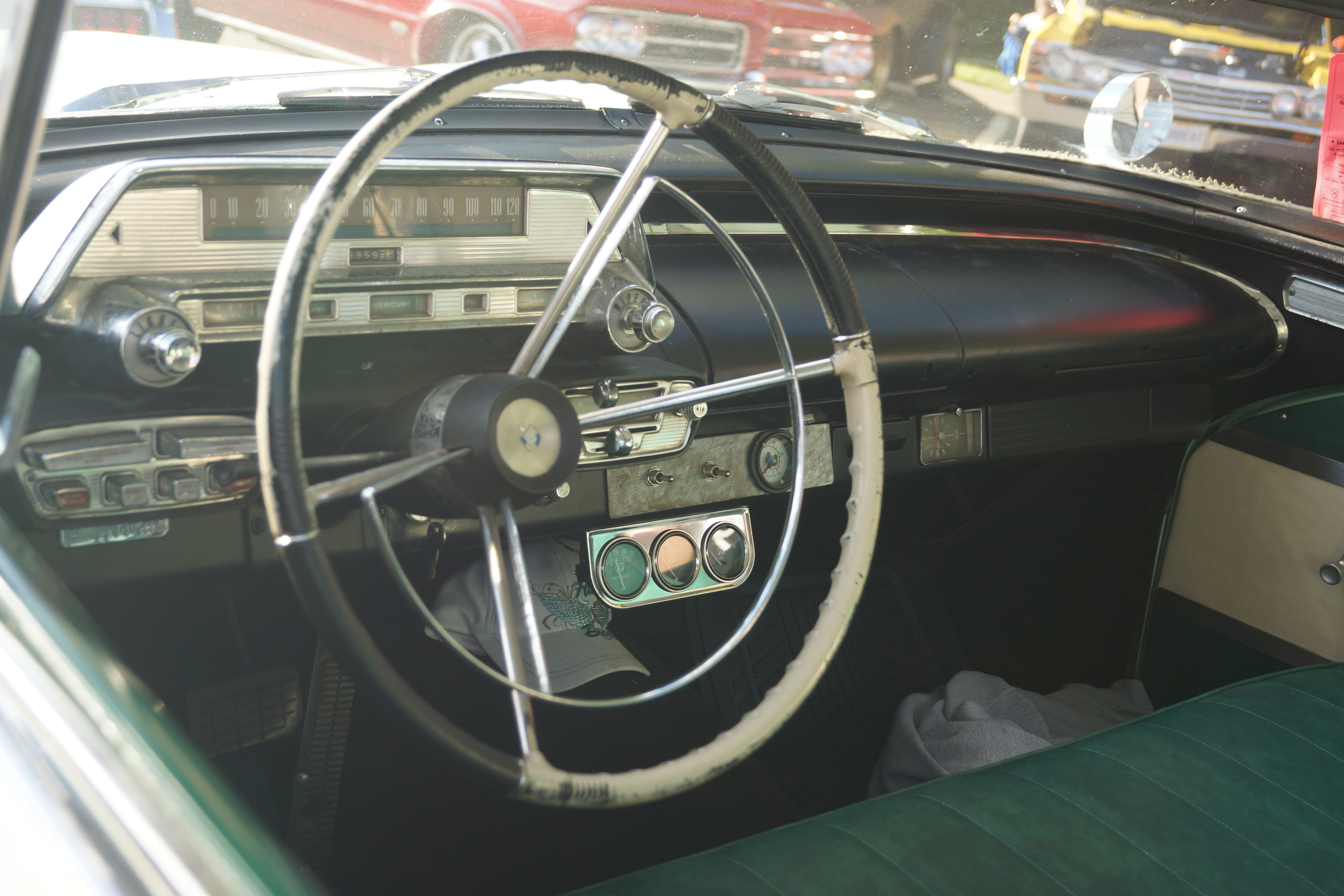
1958 Mercury Voyager dashboard showing "Multi-Drive" controls to the left of the steering wheel
