= Lincoln Capri =

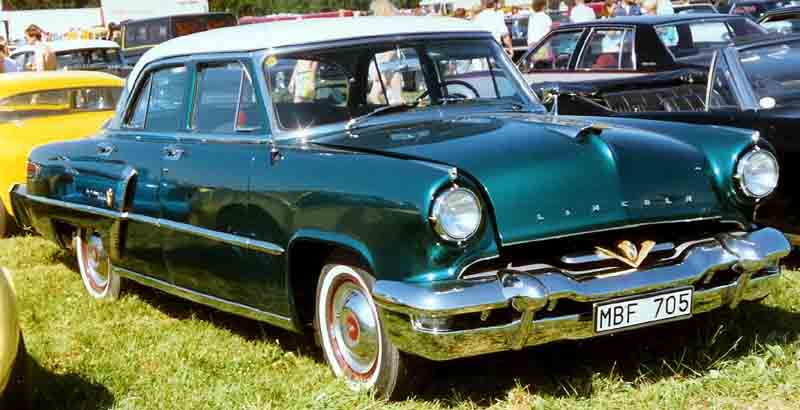
- 1953 Lincoln Capri sedan

Overview
- Manufacturer: Lincoln (Ford)
- Production: 1952–1959

Body and chassis
- Class: Full-size luxury car
- Layout: FR layout

Chronology
- Predecessor: Lincoln Cosmopolitan
- Successor: Lincoln Premiere

The Lincoln Capri is an automobile that was sold by the Lincoln division of Ford Motor Company from 1952 until 1959. A full-size luxury car, the Lincoln Capri derives its name from an Italian island in the Gulf of Naples. Positioned as a premium trim variant of the two-door Lincoln Cosmopolitan, the Capri was introduced in 1952 as a stand-alone model line serving as the premium Lincoln. With the introduction of the Lincoln Premiere (and Continental), the Capri replaced the Cosmopolitan as the standard Lincoln product line.

The Lincoln Capri was produced across three generations; following its withdrawal, Lincoln rebranded the Capri using only its division name (following a practice used from 1946 to 1951). Along with the Lincoln Premiere and the Continental model lines, the Lincoln Capri was replaced by the 1961 Lincoln Continental.

== First generation (1952–1955) ==
Generation I
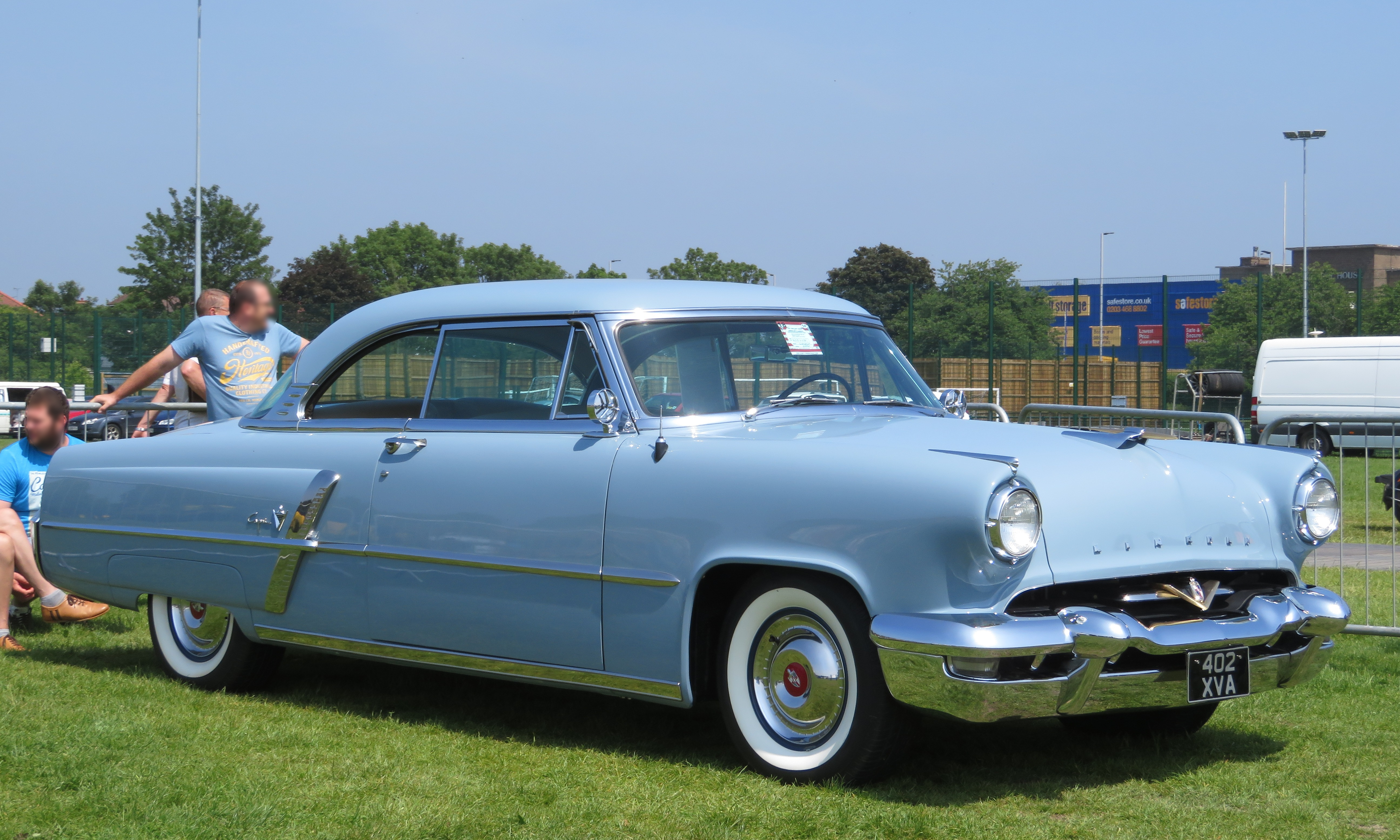
- 1953 Lincoln Capri Special Custom Coupe

Overview
- Model years: 1952–1955
- Assembly: Lincoln Motor Company Plant, Detroit, Michigan; Wayne Assembly, Wayne, Michigan (Branch Assembly); Maywood Assembly, Maywood, California; St. Louis Assembly Plant, St.Louis, Missouri
- Designer: Bill Schmidt

Body and chassis
- Body style: 2-door coupe 2-door convertible 4-door sedan
- Related: Lincoln Cosmopolitan; Lincoln Custom; Mercury Monterey; Ford Crestline

Powertrain
- Engine: 317 cu in (5.2 L) Lincoln Y-block V8; 341 cu in (5.6 L) Lincoln Y-block V8 (1955)
- Transmission: 4-speed Hydra-Matic automatic 3-speed Turbo-Drive automatic

Dimensions
- Wheelbase: 123.0 in (3,124 mm)
- Length: 1952: 214.0 in (5,436 mm); 1953: 214.1 in (5,438 mm); 1954: 215.0 in (5,461 mm); 1955: 215.6 in (5,476 mm)
- Width: 1952–54: 77.5 in (1,968 mm); 1955: 77.6 in (1,971 mm)
- Height: 1952–54: 62.6 in (1,590 mm); 1955: 62.7 in (1,593 mm)
- Curb weight: 4,300–4,600 lb (2,000–2,100 kg)

Competing against the Cadillac Series 62, Chrysler New Yorker, and Packard Pacific, 14,342 Capris were sold in its debut year, and nearly double that, 26,640, in 1953. It readily outsold its stablemate, the Cosmopolitan, each year until the Cosmopolitan's demise. The Capri had a new Lincoln 90 degree V8 engine. It was not offered in an extended length limousine, and the listed retail price was US$3,665 for the convertible ($44,435 in 2025 dollars) which was a significant price reduction from the elite luxury sedans the company had produced in the past and very close in price to similarly sized and equipped competitor vehicles of the same time. The exclusive Lincoln Continental had been discontinued in 1948, leaving only the Cosmopolitan. The two-door Capri, an up-trimmed two-door Cosmopolitan, became the flagship product by default while design and research had started on the eventual return of the Continental name with the 1956 Continental Mark II.

In the October, 1952 issue of Popular Mechanics, a Lincoln Capri with the new 160 hp (120 kW) 317 cu in (5.2 L) overhead valve Lincoln Y-block was tested. 0-60 mph time was 14.8 seconds, while the quarter-mile was 21.3 seconds.

In 1955, the Capri featured a new somewhat larger 341 cu in (5.6 L) but much more powerful 225 hp (168 kW) engine, with a higher 8.5:1 compression ratio and a four-barrel Holley carburetor, mated to a standard (Ford-built) 3-speed Turbo-Drive automatic transmission. It was the only year for that engine.

Riding on a 123.0 in (3,120 mm) wheelbase and measuring 215.6 in (5,480 mm) overall, the 1955 Capri was offered as a two-door hardtop coupé (4,305 lb (1,953 kg) shipping weight), two-door convertible (4,415 lb (2,003 kg) shipping weight), or a four-door sedan (4,275 lb (1,939 kg) shipping weight).

The Capri was also one of the first vehicles to offer an automatic headlight dimmer as optional equipment. It sold 23,673 copies, amounting to 87% of Lincoln's total output that year, actually down from 29,552 in 1954.

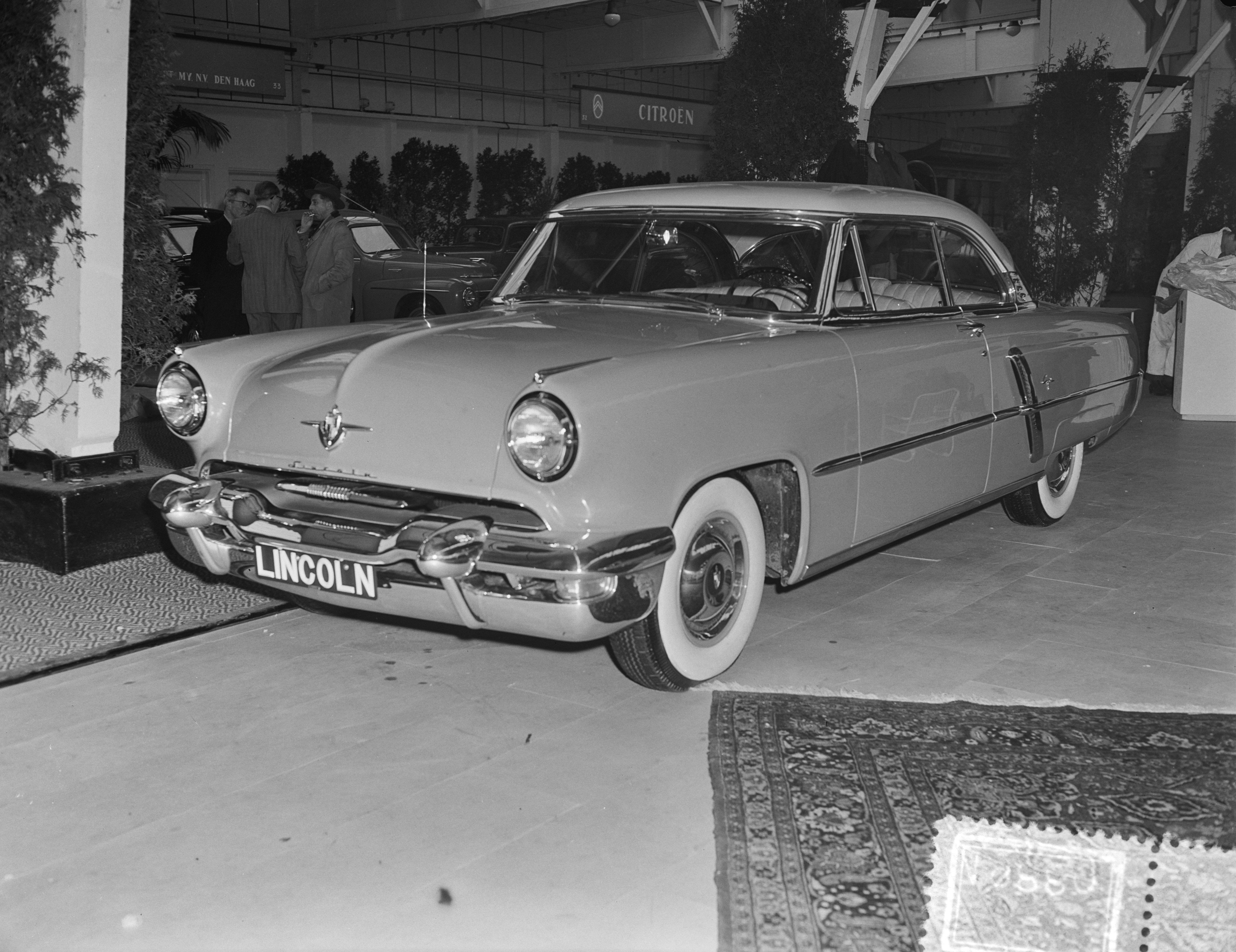
1952 Lincoln Capri Special Custom Coupe

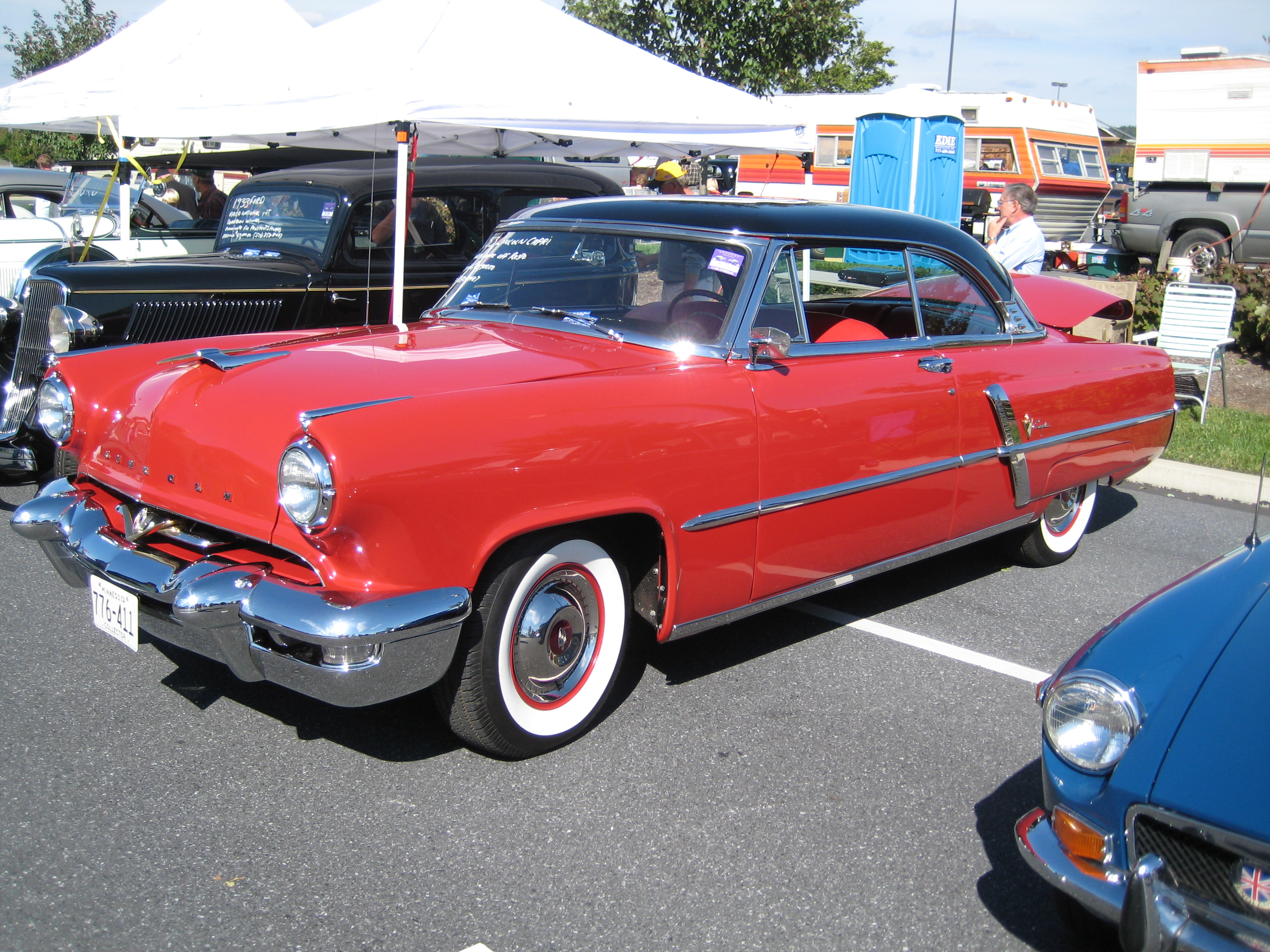
1953 Lincoln Capri Special Custom Coupe

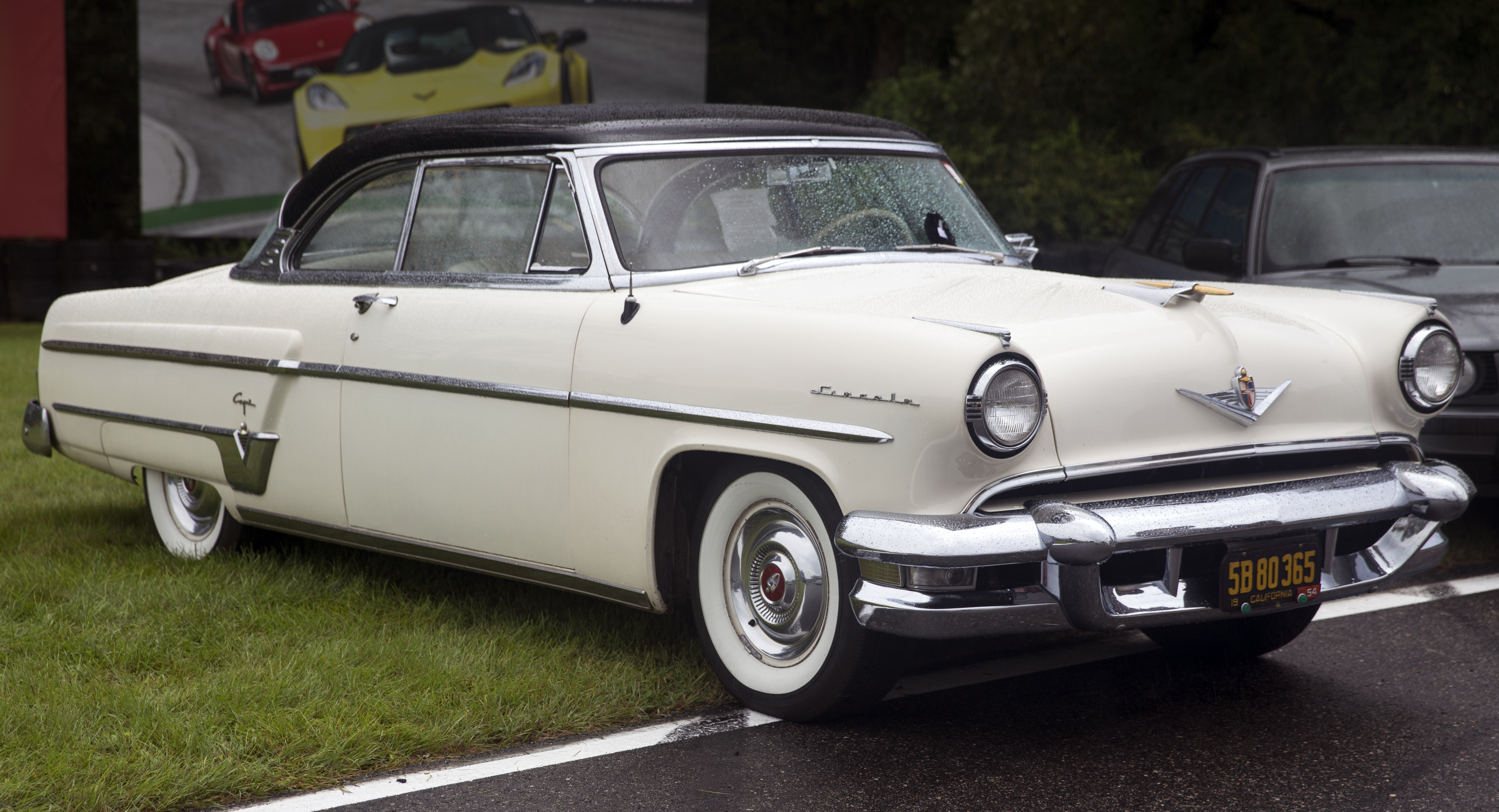
1954 Lincoln Capri Special Custom Coupe

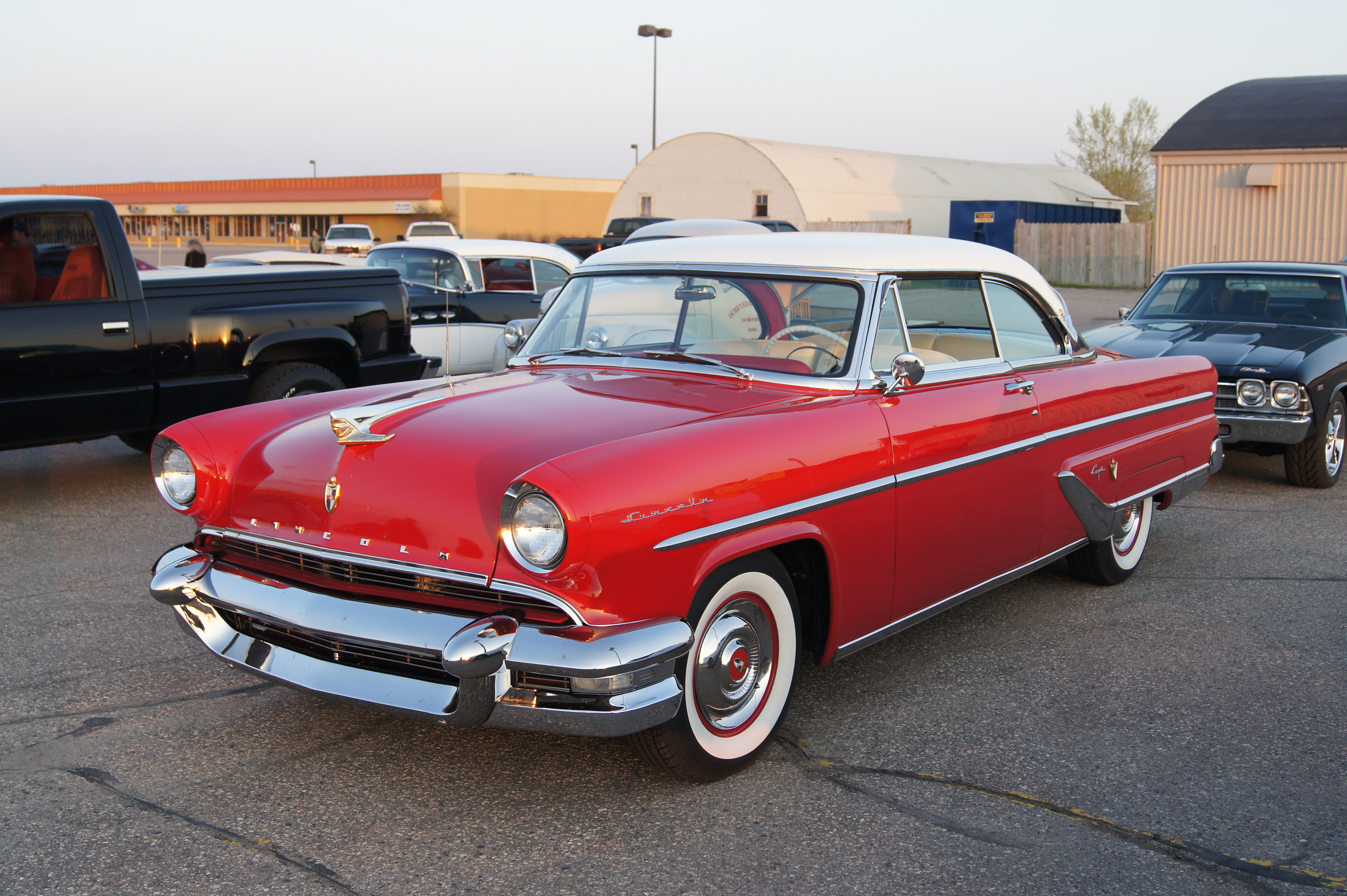
1955 Lincoln Capri Special Custom Coupe

== Second generation (1956–1957) ==
Generation II
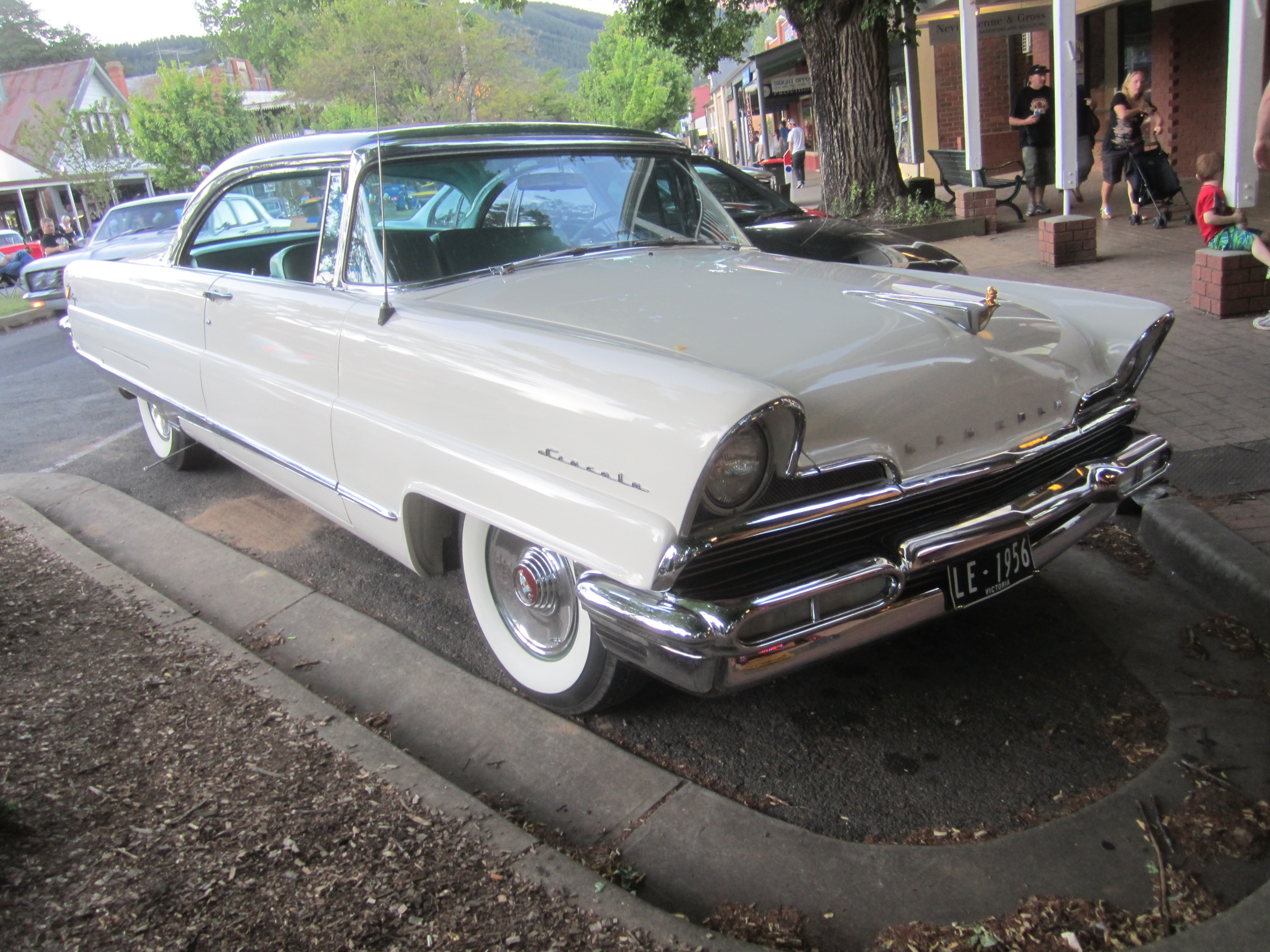
- 1956 Lincoln Capri Sport Coupe

Overview
- Model years: 1956–1957
- Assembly: Wayne Assembly, Wayne, Michigan; Maywood Assembly, Maywood, California
- Designer: Bill Schmidt

Body and chassis
- Body style: 2-door hardtop 4-door sedan 4-door hardtop
- Related: Lincoln Premiere; Mercury Montclair

Powertrain
- Engine: 368 cu in (6.0 L) Lincoln Y-block V8
- Transmission: 3-speed Turbo-Drive automatic

Dimensions
- Wheelbase: 126.0 in (3,200 mm)
- Length: 1956: 223.0 in (5,664 mm); 1957: 224.6 in (5,705 mm)
- Width: 1956: 79.9 in (2,029 mm); 1957: 80.3 in (2,040 mm)
- Height: 1956: 60.0 in (1,524 mm); 1957: 60.2 in (1,529 mm)
- Curb weight: 4,500–4,700 lb (2,000–2,100 kg)

For 1956, the Capri shared a division-wide restyling and gained the new 285 hp (213 kW) 368 cu in (6.0 L) Lincoln Y-Block V8 (with a four-barrel carburetor and 9:1 compression), as well as all-new 12-volt electrical system to cope with the proliferation of power accessories. The Capri moved down-market, becoming Lincoln's entry-level model and the newly introduced Premiere based on it became the upper level Lincoln-branded model. In addition, the convertible disappeared from the model range, which already lacked for a four-door hardtop. Sales dropped dramatically, to only 8,791 in 1956 while the listed retail price for the Hardtop Sport Coupe was US$4,119 ($48,778 in 2025 dollars). This is not to imply that over all sales did not increase for 1956. The total production for both Capri and Premiere models was 50,322. Four-way power seats were optional.

The Capri's appearance borrowed from the radically different concept cars, the Mercury XM-800 and the Lincoln Futura in an era of fascination with the Space Race and mid-century modern architecture and appearances. 1957 introduced a driving light below the conventional sealed beam, two-way headlight while giving an appearance of having stacked dual headlights.

A new camshaft and higher 10:1 compression boosted output to 300 hp (224 kW),. The new cam did not, however, increase compression, contrary to Flory's misapprehension. Even so, sales declined again, to 5,900 units (despite the addition of a 4-door landau hardtop). A facelifted design for 1957 featured more pronounced fins. Total production for 1957 for the Capri and Premiere lines was 41,123.

To emphasize Lincoln's exclusivity and specialized appearance, there were 20 available colors, with 34 two-tone exterior color selections for 1956, increasing to 76 two-tone color choices and only 18 single color selections for 1957.

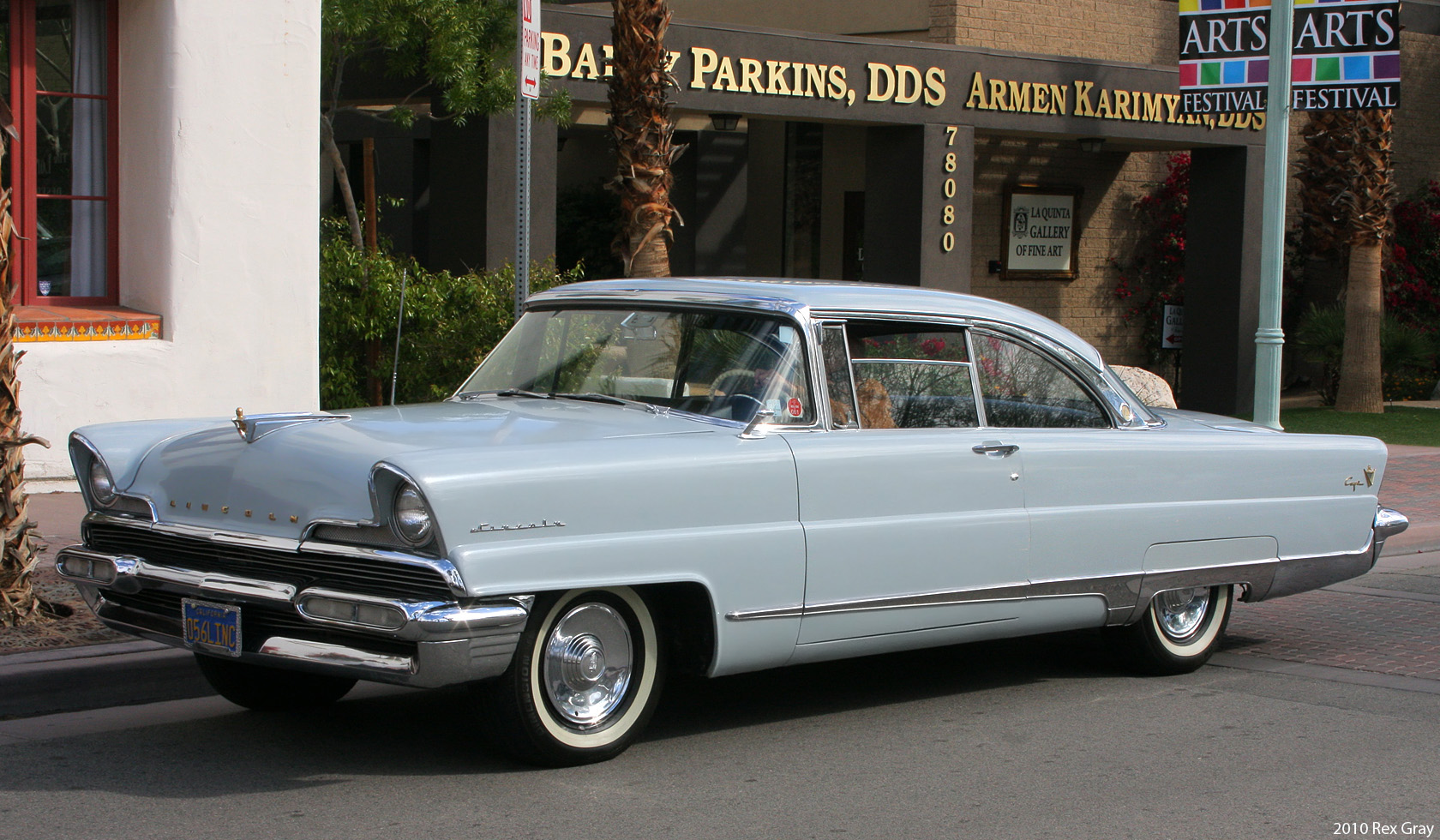
1956 Lincoln Capri Sport Coupe

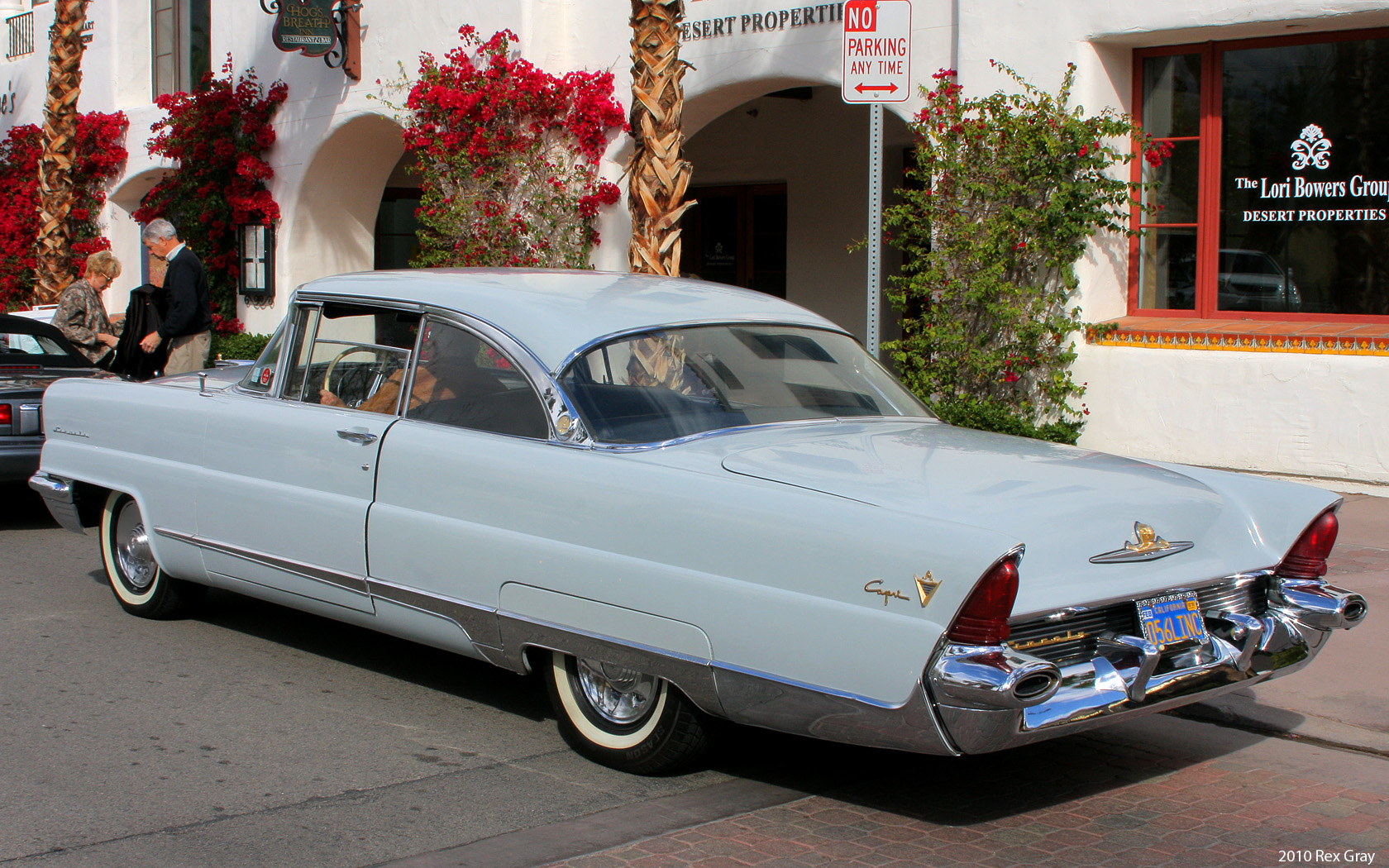
1956 Lincoln Capri Sport Coupe

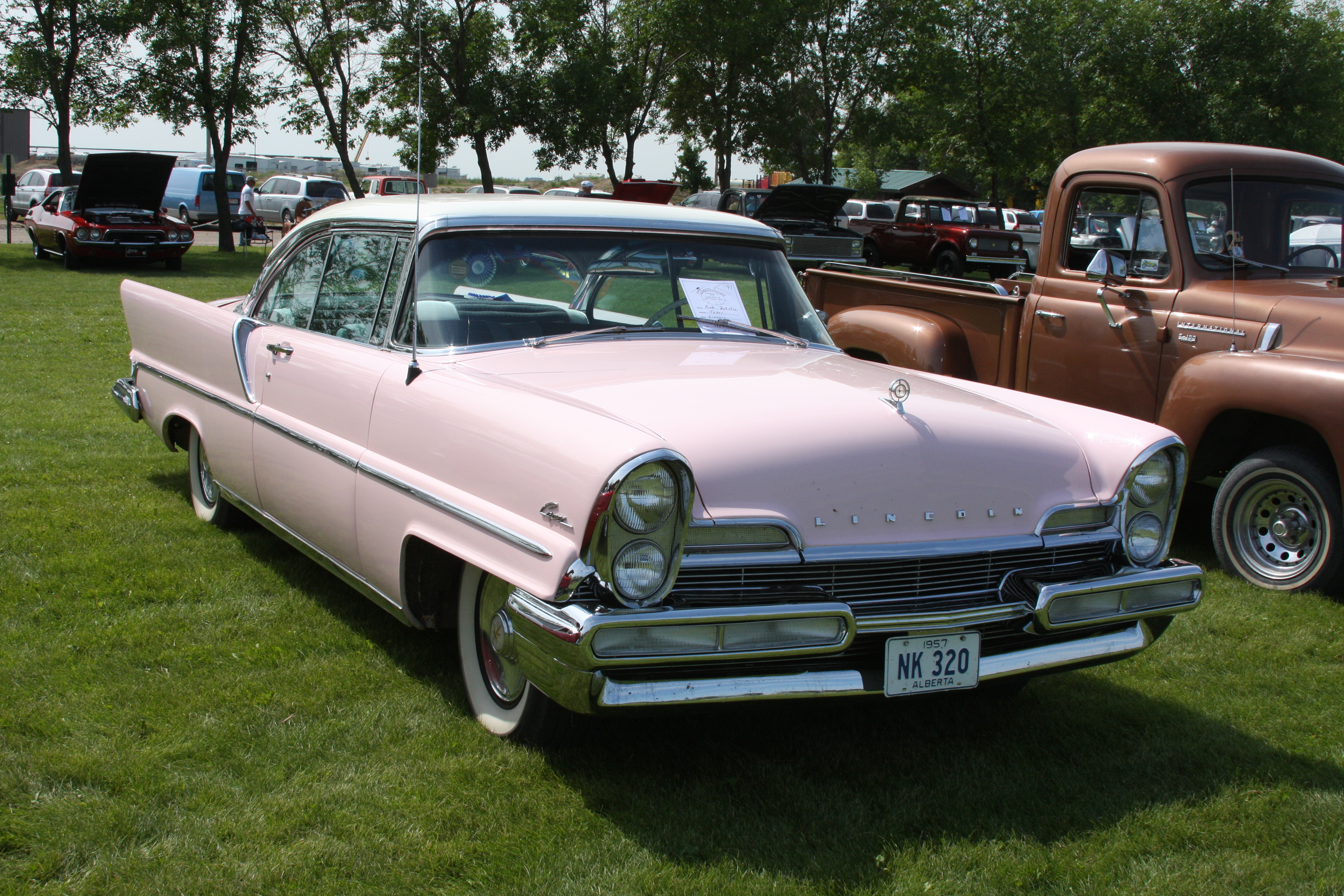
1957 Lincoln Capri Sport Coupe

1957–1958 Comparison	1957 Capri	1958 Capri
Wheelbase	126.0 in (3,200 mm)	131.0 in (3,327 mm)
Overall Length	224.6 in (5,705 mm)	229.0 in (5,817 mm)
Width	80.3 in (2,040 mm)	80.1 in (2,035 mm)
Height	60.2 in (1,529 mm)	56.5 in (1,435 mm)
Front Headroom	35.4 in (899 mm)	35.0 in (889 mm)
Front Legroom	44.8 in (1,138 mm)	44.4 in (1,128 mm)
Front Hip Room	61.7 in (1,567 mm)	61.0 in (1,549 mm)
Front Shoulder Room	59.4 in (1,509 mm)	63.1 in (1,603 mm)
Rear Headroom	34.1 in (866 mm)	33.8 in (859 mm)
Rear Legroom–ins.	42.5 in (1,080 mm)	46.6 in (1,184 mm)
Rear Hip Room	63.8 in (1,621 mm)	65.5 in (1,664 mm)
Rear Shoulder Room	58.4 in (1,483 mm)	63.0 in (1,600 mm)

== Third generation (1958–1959) ==
Generation III

Overview
- Model years: 1958–1959
- Assembly: Wixom Assembly Plant, Wixom, Michigan
- Designer: John Najjar

Body and chassis
- Body style: 2-door hardtop 4-door sedan 4-door hardtop
- Related: Continental Mark series Lincoln Premiere

Powertrain
- Engine: 430 cu in (7.0 L) MEL V8
- Transmission: 3-speed Turbo-Drive automatic

Dimensions
- Wheelbase: 131.0 in (3,327 mm)
- Length: 1958: 229.0 in (5,817 mm); 1959: 227.1 in (5,768 mm)
- Width: 80.1 in (2,035 mm)
- Height: 1958: 56.5 in (1,435 mm); 1959: 56.7 in (1,440 mm)
- Curb weight: 4,900–5,200 lb (2,200–2,400 kg)

These were the first Lincolns produced at the new Wixom, Michigan, plant, and were made on a unibody platform much like the Lincoln-Zephyr and the original Lincoln Continental. While advertising brochures made the case that Continental Division was still a separate make, the car shared its body with that year's Lincoln. The Lincoln Capri was the base model in the Lincoln product line, with the Lincoln Premiere positioned as higher level of standard equipment. Lincoln lost over $60 million during 1958–1960, partly reflecting the expense of developing perhaps the largest unibody car ever made. The 1958 full-size Lincoln sold poorly in all models because of the economic recession in the U.S.

The 1958–1959 Lincoln Capri was one of the largest cars ever made, larger than contemporaneous Cadillacs and Imperials, and with their canted headlights and scalloped fenders had styling considered by many to be excessive even in that decade of styling excess. On a 131.0 in (3,327 mm) wheelbase, and 229.0 in (5,817 mm) long overall, 80.1 in (2,035 mm) wide and up to 4,810 lb (2,180 kg) shipping weight in the landau sedan in 1958, they are the longest Lincolns ever produced without federally mandated 5 mph (8.0 km/h) bumpers. The all-new 375 hp (280 kW) 430 cu in (7.0 L) MEL V8 was a welcome addition. The 63.1 inches (1,603 mm) front and 63.0 inches (1,600 mm) rear shoulder room they possessed set a record for Lincoln that still stands to this day. Sales were up, to 6,859, the landau sedan making up almost half, at 3,014 copies. Heater and defroster (at US$110), AM radio (US$144), and seat belts (US$25) were all optional. One rare option was an FM radio for $129(had to have the AM also). Brakes were 11-inch drums.

The reputation for "excessive styling" is perhaps ironic given the enormous amount of styling talent that was connected with the development and modification of Lincolns of this vintage. George W. Walker, known for his contribution to the development of the original Ford Thunderbird, was vice-president in charge of Styling at Ford during this time. Elwood Engel, famous for being lead designer of the 1961 Lincoln Continental and for his work as chief designer at Chrysler in the 1960s, was Staff Stylist (and consequently roamed all of the design studios) at Ford during this period and worked very closely with John Najjar in developing not only the 1958, but also the 1959 update. After John Najjar was relieved of his responsibilities as Chief Stylist of Lincoln in 1957 he became Engel's executive assistant, and the two worked closely together in the "stilleto studio" in developing the 1961 Lincoln Continental, which of course won an award for its superlative styling. After Engel left Ford in 1961, Najjar became the lead designer of the Ford Mustang I concept car, which later gave birth to the Ford Mustang. Don Delarossa, who succeeded Najjar as Chief Stylist of Lincoln, was responsible for the 1960 Continental and Premiere update, and went on to become chief designer at Chrysler in the 1980s. Alex Tremulis, who was Chief Stylist at Auburn-Cord-Duesenberg in the mid to late 1930s and famous for his work on the 1948 Tucker Sedan, was head of Ford's Advanced Styling Studio during this period, and it was his Ford La Tosca concept car, with its oval overlaid with an "X" theme, that gave birth to the "slant eyed monster" nickname to the 1958 Lincoln front end.

Despite an increase in sales in 1959, to 7,929 units, the Capri was not renewed for 1960.

=== 1960 Lincoln ===
For the 1960 model year, Lincoln introduced a namesake model line to serve as a replacement for the discontinued Lincoln Capri. Intended as a competitor for the Cadillac Series 62 and Chrysler New Yorker, the 1960 Lincoln combined the trim of the Lincoln Capri with the facelift adopted by the 1960 Lincoln Premiere and Continental Mark V.

As with the Premiere and Continental, the Lincoln was fitted with a 430 cubic-inch V8; a switch to a 2-barrel carburetor for all three vehicles reduced engine output to 310 hp.

For 1961, Lincoln consolidated its model lines from three to one, with a Lincoln Continental serving as the replacement for the Lincoln, Premiere and Continental Mark V.

== Use in motorsport ==
The Lincoln Capri competed in the Stock Car category of the Pan American Road Race from 1952 to 1954. In 1952 and 1953, the Capri earned first through fourth place, with the model taking first and second place in 1954 (the final year of the race).

== Further use of nameplate ==
Following its use by the Lincoln division, the Capri nameplate would see subsequent use by both Ford and Mercury for the next three decades. Ford UK produced the Ford Consul Capri from 1962 to 1964 as a coupe version of its mid-size model range. Ford of Europe produced the Ford Capri compact sports coupe from 1968 to 1986, largely designed as the European equivalent of the Ford Mustang.

As a Mercury, the Capri nameplate first saw use as a trim level for the Mercury Comet from 1966 to 1967. From 1970 to 1978, the Ford Capri was sold by Lincoln-Mercury in North America (without a divisional nameplate). As a replacement, from 1979 to 1986, the Mercury Capri was sold as the Mercury counterpart of the Ford Mustang. From 1991 to 1994, the Mercury Capri was sold as a 2+2 roadster, imported from Ford of Australia, which produced its version as the Ford Capri.

In 2024, Ford of Europe started production of the all electric Ford Capri EV.

Alongside Zephyr, Capri is the only nameplate ever used by all three Ford divisions.
