= Lincoln Premiere =

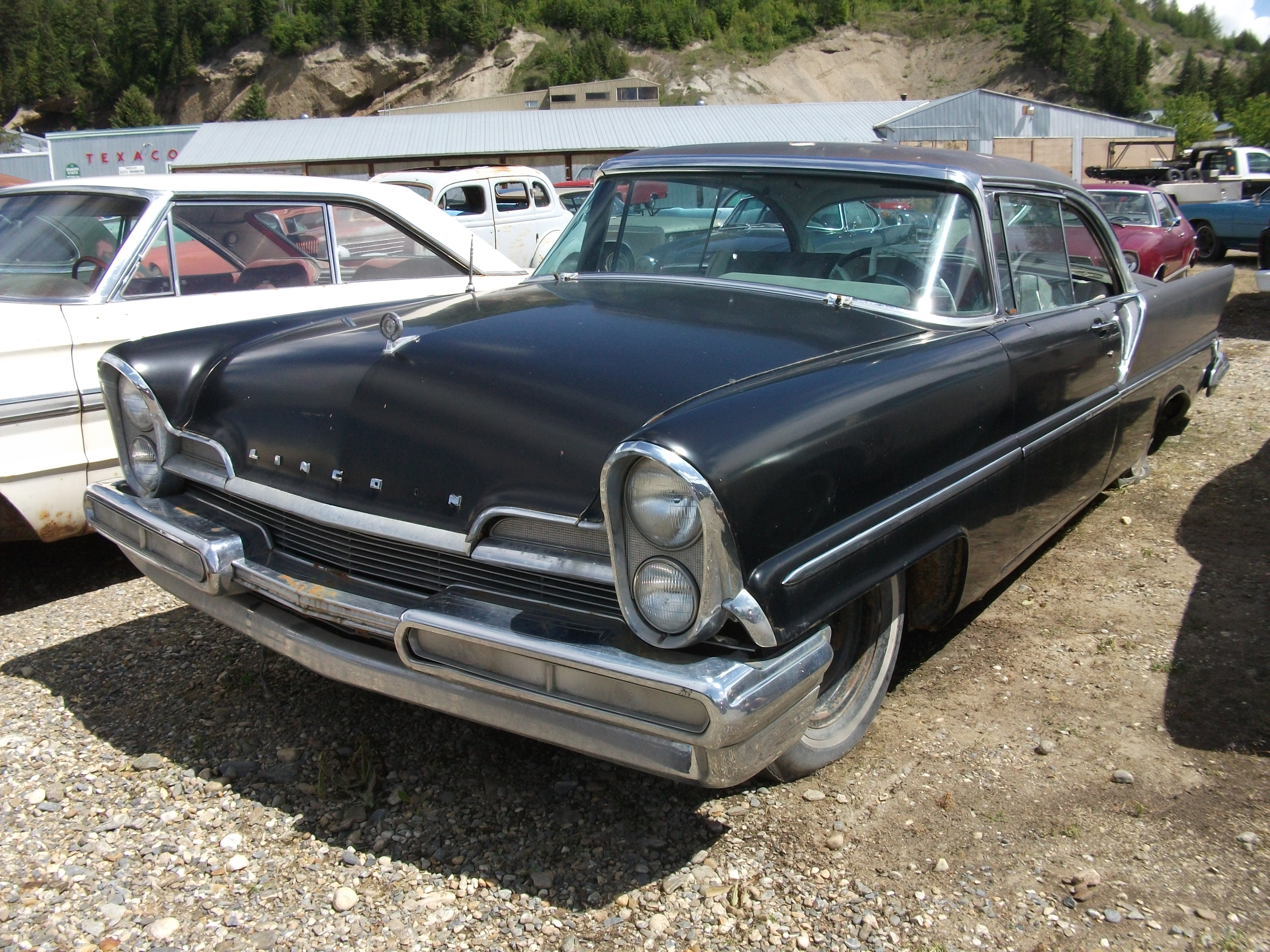
- 1957 Lincoln Premiere 2-Door Hardtop Coupe

Overview
- Manufacturer: Lincoln (Ford)
- Production: 1955–1960

Body and chassis
- Class: full-size luxury car
- Layout: FR layout

Chronology
- Predecessor: Lincoln Cosmopolitan
- Successor: Lincoln Continental (1961)

The Lincoln Premiere is a luxury car model that was sold by Lincoln in the 1956 to 1960 model years. Positioned below the company's Continental Mark II coupe during 1956–1957 and above the Capri which it shared from 1956 to 1959, it was produced in 2 and 4 door versions which could both accommodate up to six people.

The Premiere was for a short time the largest, top level 4-door sedan Lincoln offered against rivals from Cadillac, Imperial and Packard during the mid-1950s while not being available as an extended length limousine.

For 1958, the Premiere shared its chassis and mechanicals with the Continental Mark III–V sedans, until it was replaced with the 1961 Continental sedan.

The Premiere name has been currently revived as a trim level on Lincoln models.

== 1956–1957 ==
First generation
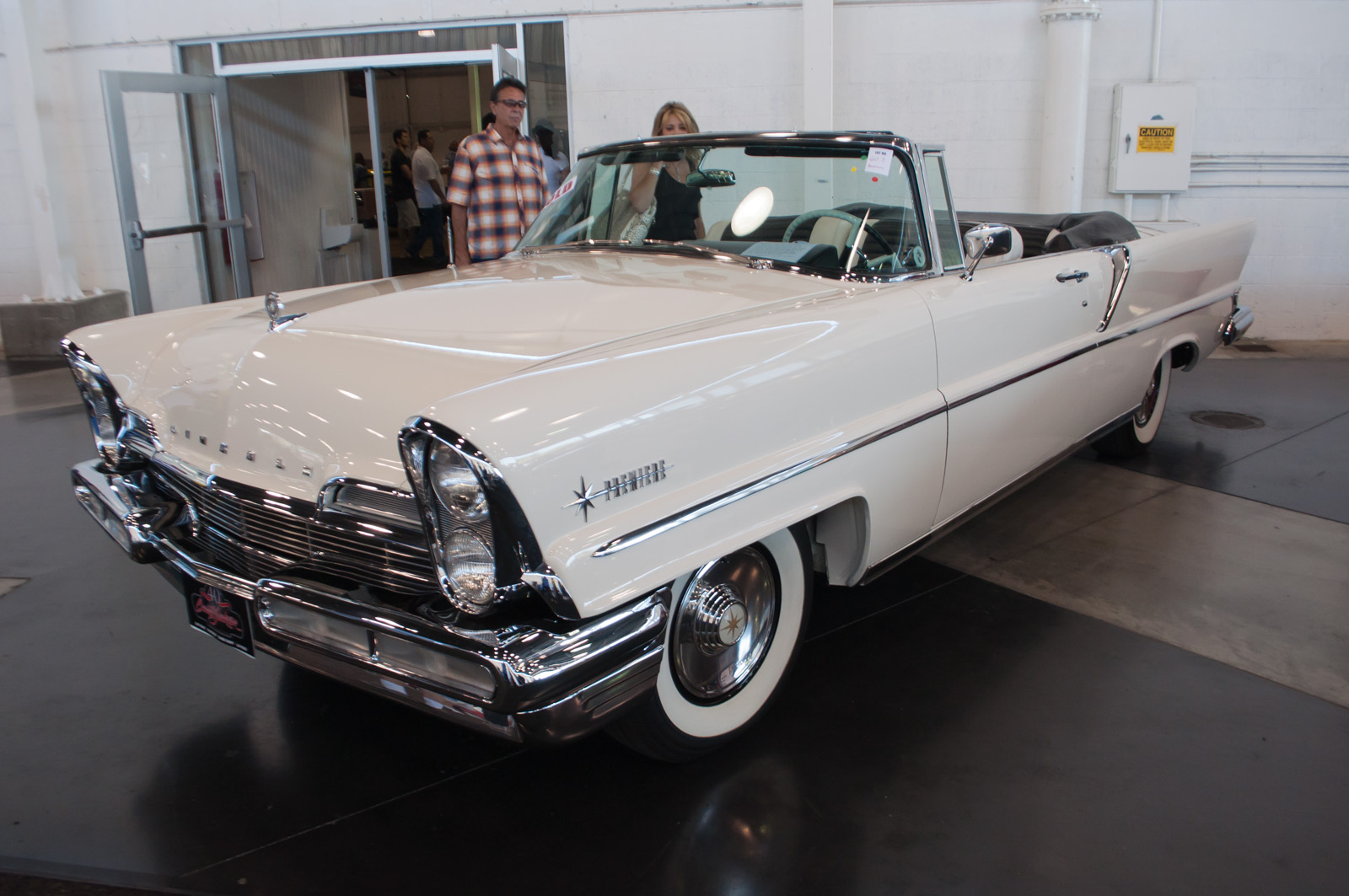
- 1957 Lincoln Premiere Convertible

Overview
- Model years: 1956–1957
- Assembly: Wayne Assembly, Wayne, Michigan (Branch Assembly); Maywood Assembly, Maywood, California
- Designer: Bill Schmidt

Body and chassis
- Body style: 2-door hardtop 2-door convertible 4-door sedan 4-door hardtop
- Related: Lincoln Capri; Mercury Montclair

Powertrain
- Engine: 368 cu in (6.0 L) Lincoln Y-block V8
- Transmission: 3-speed Turbo-Drive automatic

Dimensions
- Wheelbase: 126.0 in (3,200 mm)
- Length: 1956: 223.0 in (5,664 mm); 1957: 224.6 in (5,705 mm)
- Width: 1956: 79.9 in (2,029 mm); 1957: 80.3 in (2,040 mm)
- Height: 1956: 60.0 in (1,524 mm); 1957: 60.2 in (1,529 mm)
- Curb weight: 4,500–4,900 lb (2,000–2,200 kg)

The Premiere was introduced in 1956 as an upscale version of the Lincoln Capri. It featured a 368 cu in (6.0 L) Lincoln Y-Block V8 and it was approximately 223 in (5,700 mm) long in 1956. The vehicle weighed 4,357 pounds (1,976 kg) and had a base price of $4,601 in 1956 ($54,486 in 2025 dollars). The top-end Lincoln, it was substantially different from the much more expensive and conservatively styled Continental Mark II sold by Ford's Continental Motorcars division, and was marketed against the Cadillac Series 62, Imperial Crown Coupe and Packard Patrician. To emphasize Lincoln's exclusivity and specialized appearance, there were 20 available colors, with 34 two-tone exterior color selections for 1956, increasing to 76 two-tone color choices and only 18 single color selections for 1957. 1956 production totals show a combination of 19,619 Hardtop Coupes, 19,465 4-door Sedans and 2,447 Convertibles were assembled.

The Premiere's appearance reflected the Capri's derivation from the radically different concept cars, the Mercury XM-800 and the Lincoln Futura in an era of fascination with the Space Race and Mid-century modern architecture and monochromatic appearances. It was known for a stylish exterior, high-grade interior and some unique features, such as optional factory installed air conditioning being run through overhead ducts much like those in an aircraft. The cool air was directed to the roof via a pair of clear plastic ducts visible through the rear window at each side, connecting upward from the rear package tray. Four way power seats were standard. The front suspension was independent with a stabilizer bar, and for 1957 the driving light was relocated from the bottom edge of the front bumper and installed below the conventional sealed beam, two-way headlight while giving an appearance of having stacked dual headlights which Lincoln called "Quadra-Lite".

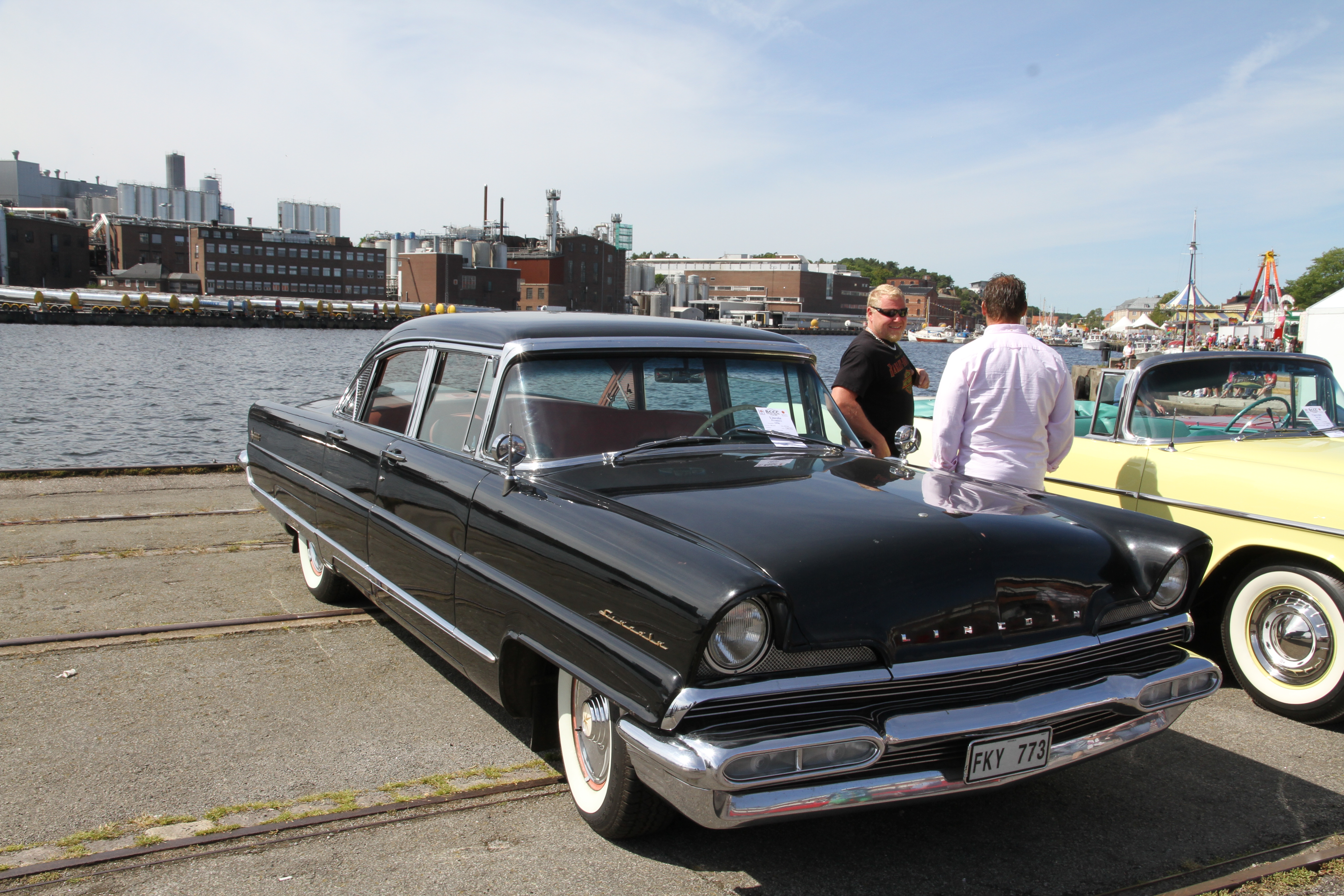
1956 Lincoln Premiere Four-Door Sedan

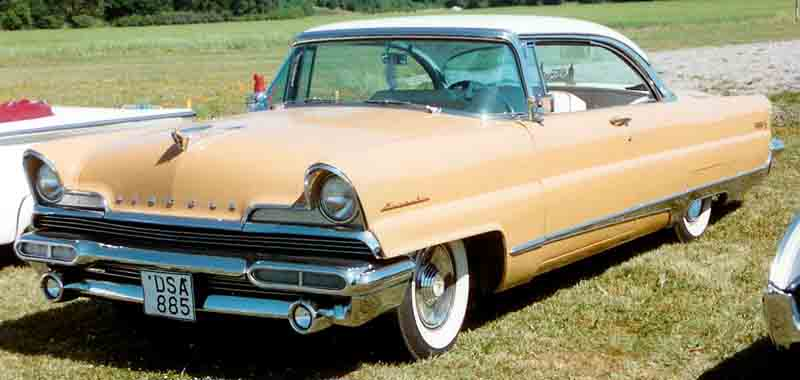
1956 Lincoln Premiere Coupe

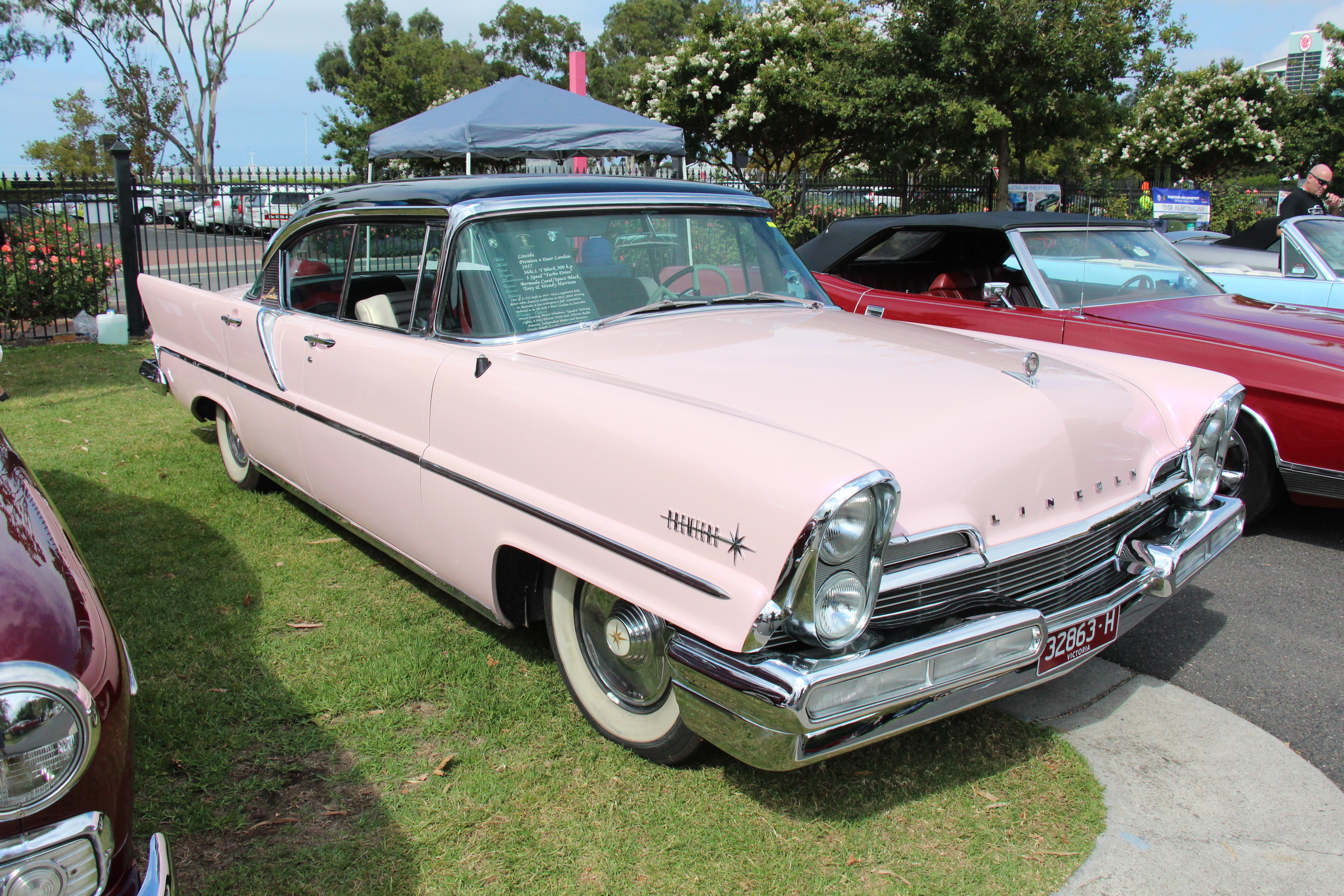
1957 Lincoln Premiere Landau 4-Door Hardtop

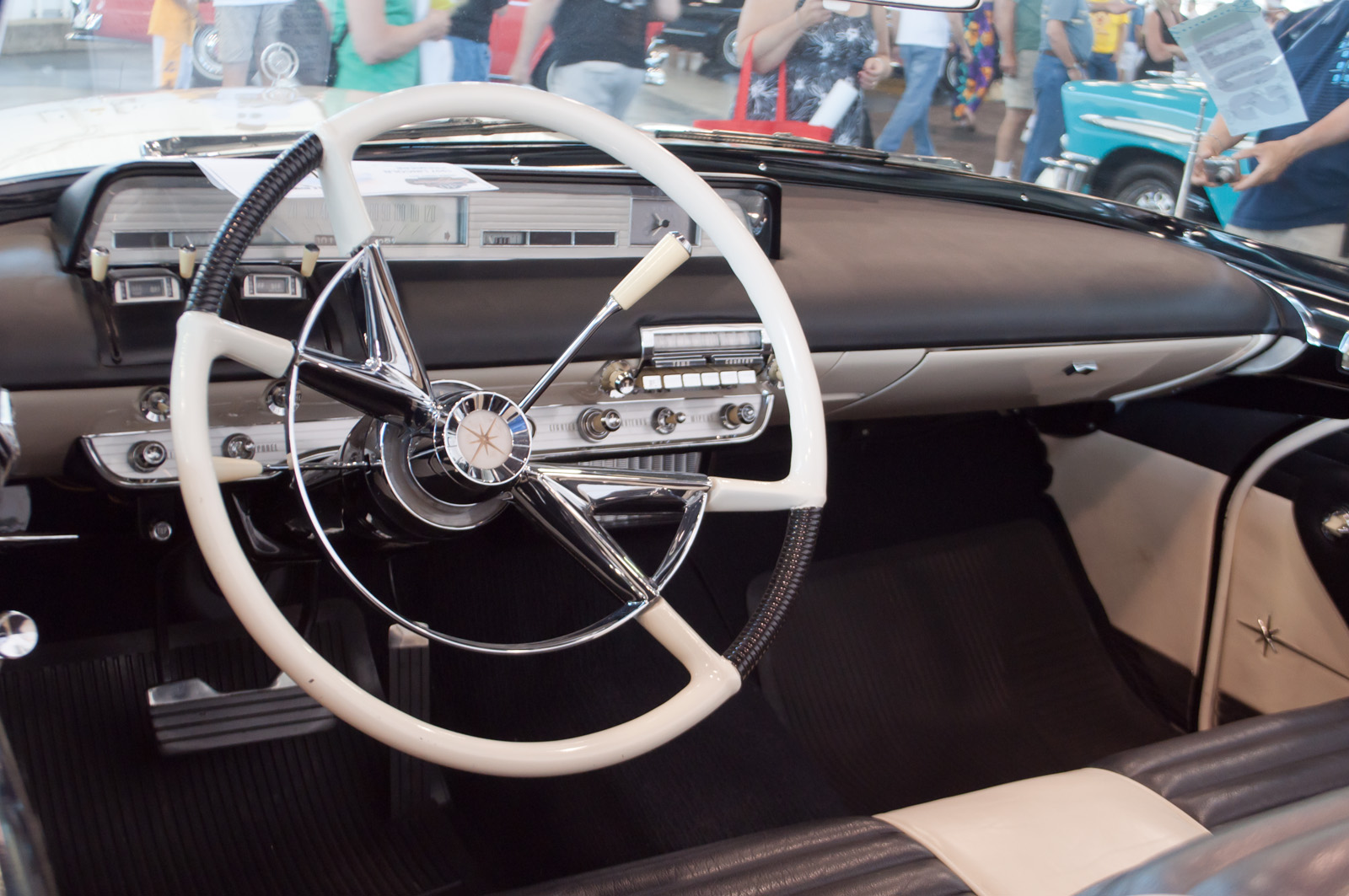
1957 Lincoln Premiere Convertible interior

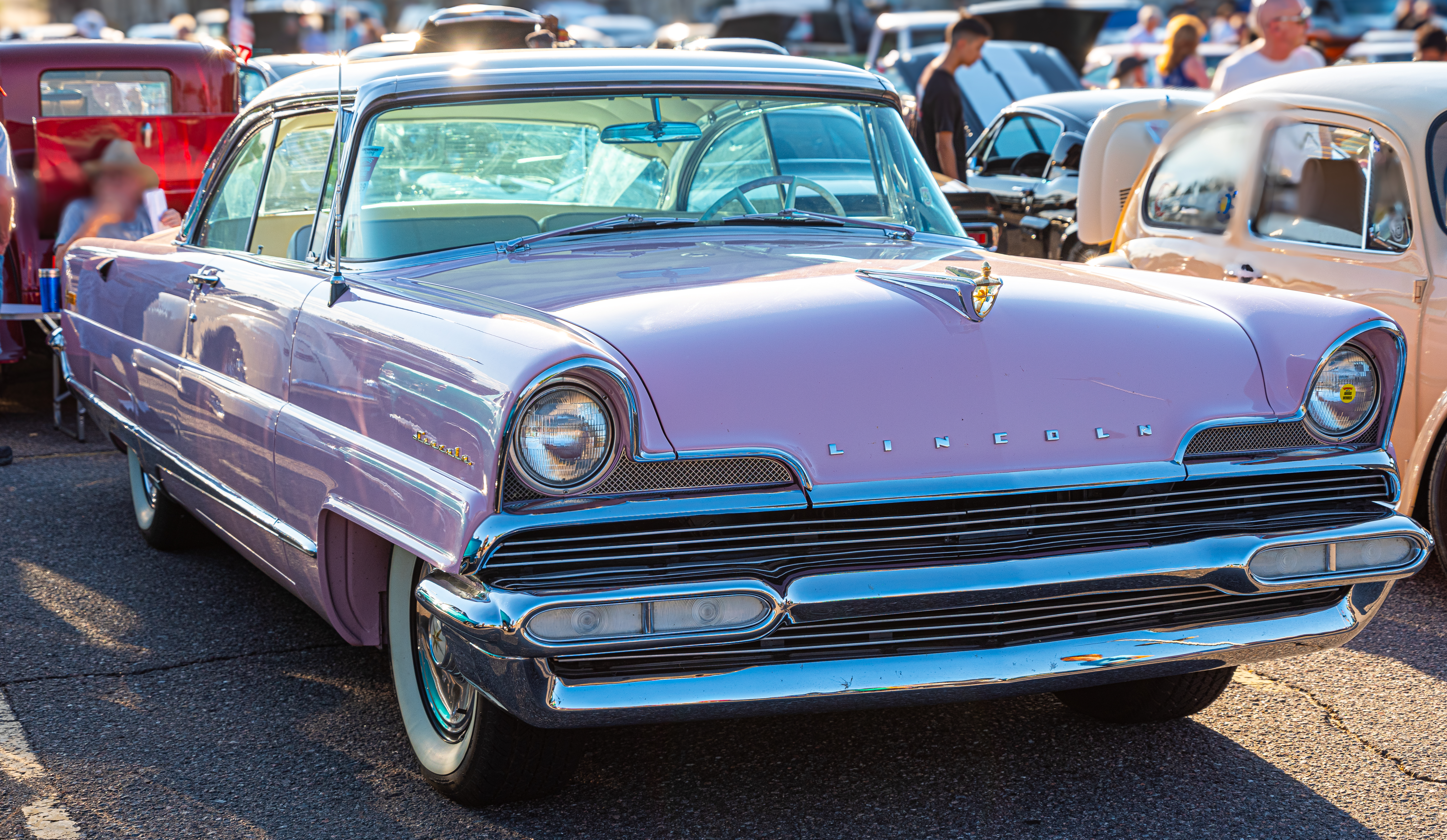
1956 Lincoln Premier in Amethyst

== 1958–1960 ==
Second generation
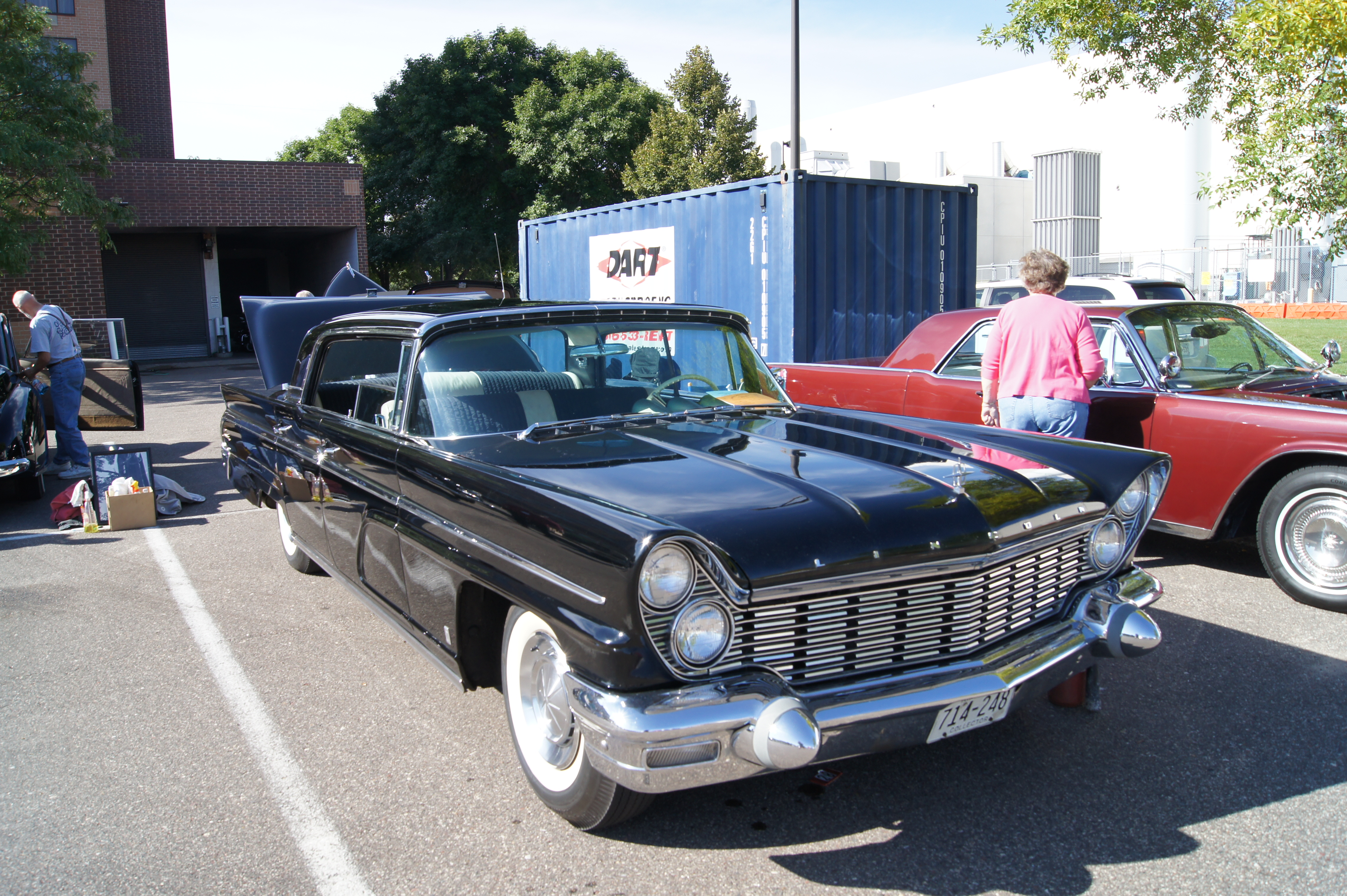
- 1960 Lincoln Premiere Four-door Landau

Overview
- Model years: 1958–1960
- Assembly: Wixom Assembly, Wixom, Michigan, USA
- Designer: John Najjar

Body and chassis
- Body style: 2-door hardtop 4-door sedan 4-door hardtop
- Related: Continental Mark series Lincoln Capri

Powertrain
- Engine: 430 cu in (7.0 L) MEL V8
- Transmission: 3-speed Turbo-Drive automatic

Dimensions
- Wheelbase: 131.0 in (3,327 mm)
- Length: 1958: 229.0 in (5,817 mm); 1959: 227.1 in (5,768 mm); 1960: 227.2 in (5,771 mm)
- Width: 1958–59: 80.1 in (2,035 mm); 1960: 80.3 in (2,040 mm)
- Height: 1958: 56.5 in (1,435 mm); 1959–60: 56.7 in (1,440 mm)
- Curb weight: 4,900–5,200 lb (2,200–2,400 kg)

These were the first Lincolns produced at the new Wixom plant, and were made on a unibody platform, Lincoln's first since the Lincoln-Zephyr. While advertising brochures made the case that Continental was still a separate make, the car shared its body with that year's Lincoln. The Lincoln Premiere was placed between the Lincoln Capri and Continental in trim level, with a traditional roof treatment instead of the Continental's extravagant reverse-angle power rear "breezeway" window that retracted behind the back seat that was also featured on the Mercury Turnpike Cruiser. Lincoln lost over $60 million ($687,796,209 in 2025 dollars) during 1958–1960, reflecting the enormous expense of developing the largest unibody car produced to date and poor consumer reception. The 1958 full-size Lincoln sold poorly in all models, compounded by the economic recession in the U.S. and sold only 10,275 with an average retail price of US$5,483 ($61,186 in 2025 dollars).

The 1958–60 Lincoln Premiere was truly hulking. One of the largest cars ever made regardless of platform, larger than contemporaneous Cadillac Sixty-Specials or Imperial Crowns. With canted headlights and heavily scalloped fenders its styling was considered excessive even in a decade overcome with it. They are the longest Lincolns ever produced without federally mandated 5 mph (8.0 km/h) bumpers. The 63.1 inches (1,603 mm) front and 63.0 inches (1,600 mm) rear shoulder room they possessed set a record for Lincoln that still stands to this day. FM radio was a rare option.

The model's overkill reflected the superabundance of styling talent involved in the development and modification of Lincolns of this vintage. George W. Walker, known for his contribution to the development of the original Ford Thunderbird, was vice-president in charge of Styling at Ford during this time. Elwood Engel, famous for being lead designer of the 1961 Lincoln Continental and for his work as chief designer at Chrysler in the 1960s, was Staff Stylist (and consequently roamed all of the design studios) at Ford during this period and worked very closely with John Najjar in developing not only the 1958, but also the 1959 update. After Najjar was relieved of his responsibilities as Chief Stylist of Lincoln in 1957 he became Engel's executive assistant, and the two worked closely together in the "stilleto studio" in developing the 1961 Lincoln Continental, which won an award for its superlative styling. After Engel left Ford in 1961, Najjar became the lead designer of the Ford Mustang I concept car, which later gave birth to the Ford Mustang. Don Delarossa, who succeeded Najjar as Chief Stylist of Lincoln, was responsible for the 1960 Continental and Premiere update, and went on to become chief designer at Chrysler in the 1980s. Alex Tremulis, Chief Stylist at Auburn-Cord-Duesenberg in the mid to late 1930s and famous for the 1948 Tucker Sedan, was head of Ford's Advanced Styling Studio during this period. It was his Ford La Tosca concept car, with its oval overlaid with an "X" theme, that gave birth to the "slant eyed monster" nickname to the 1958 Lincoln front end. Immediately after he rebounded with a contribution to Joe Oros' dramatic "bullet" design for the 1961 Thunderbird.

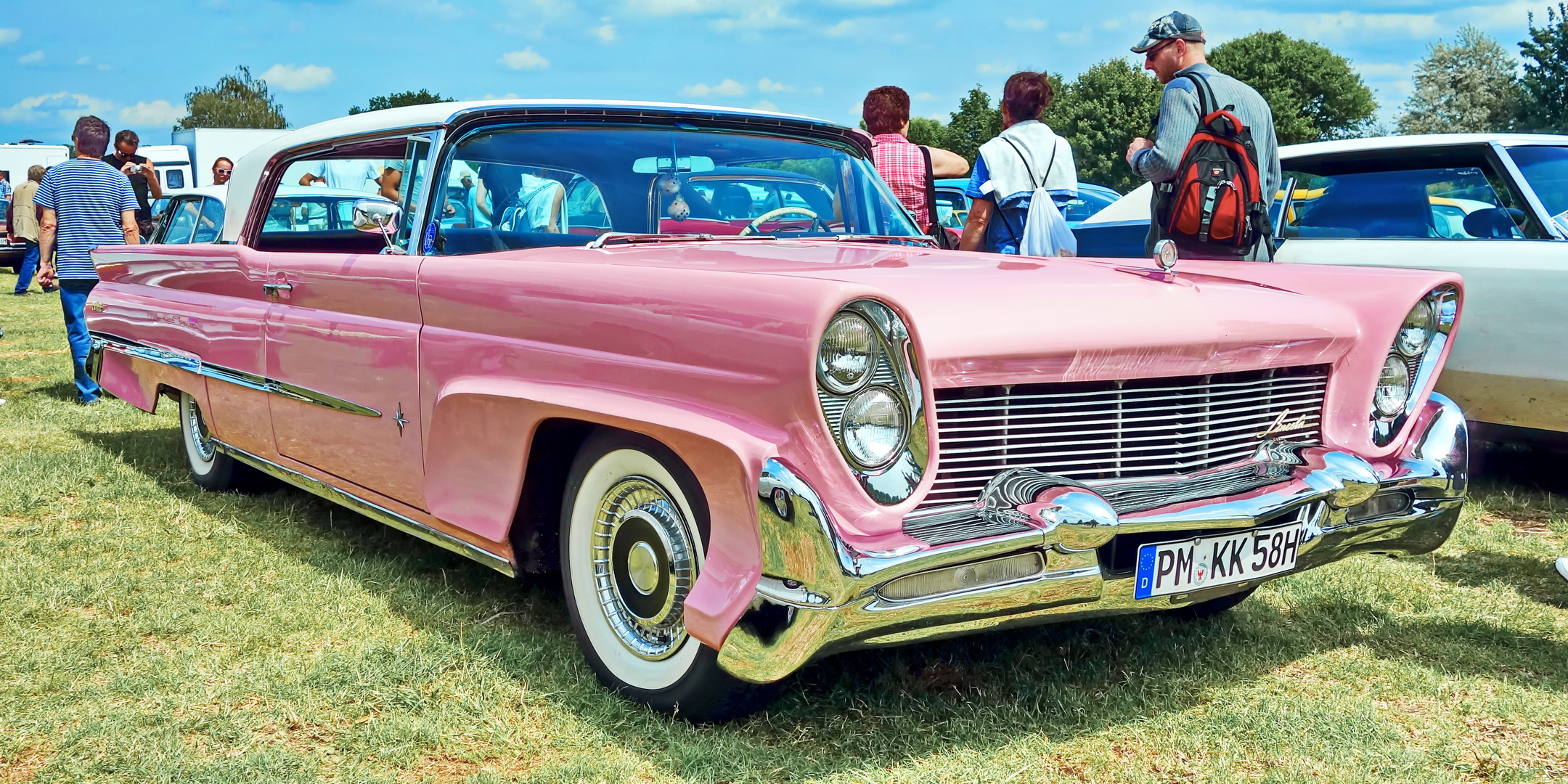
1958 Lincoln Premiere Coupe

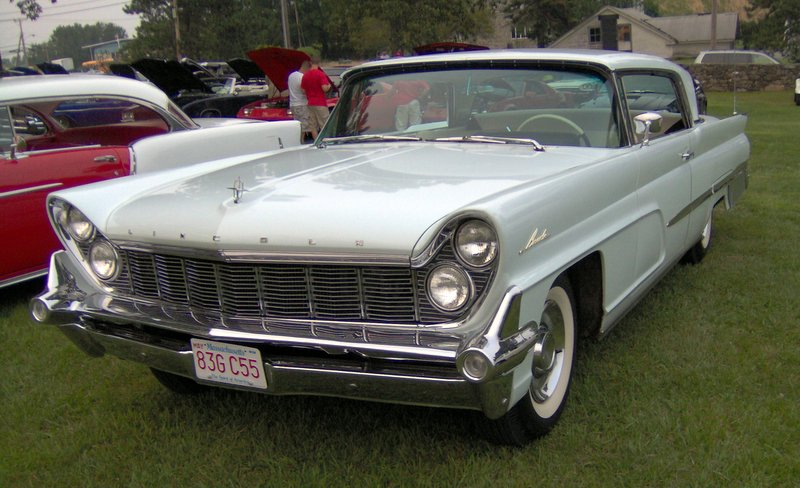
1959 Lincoln Premiere Coupe

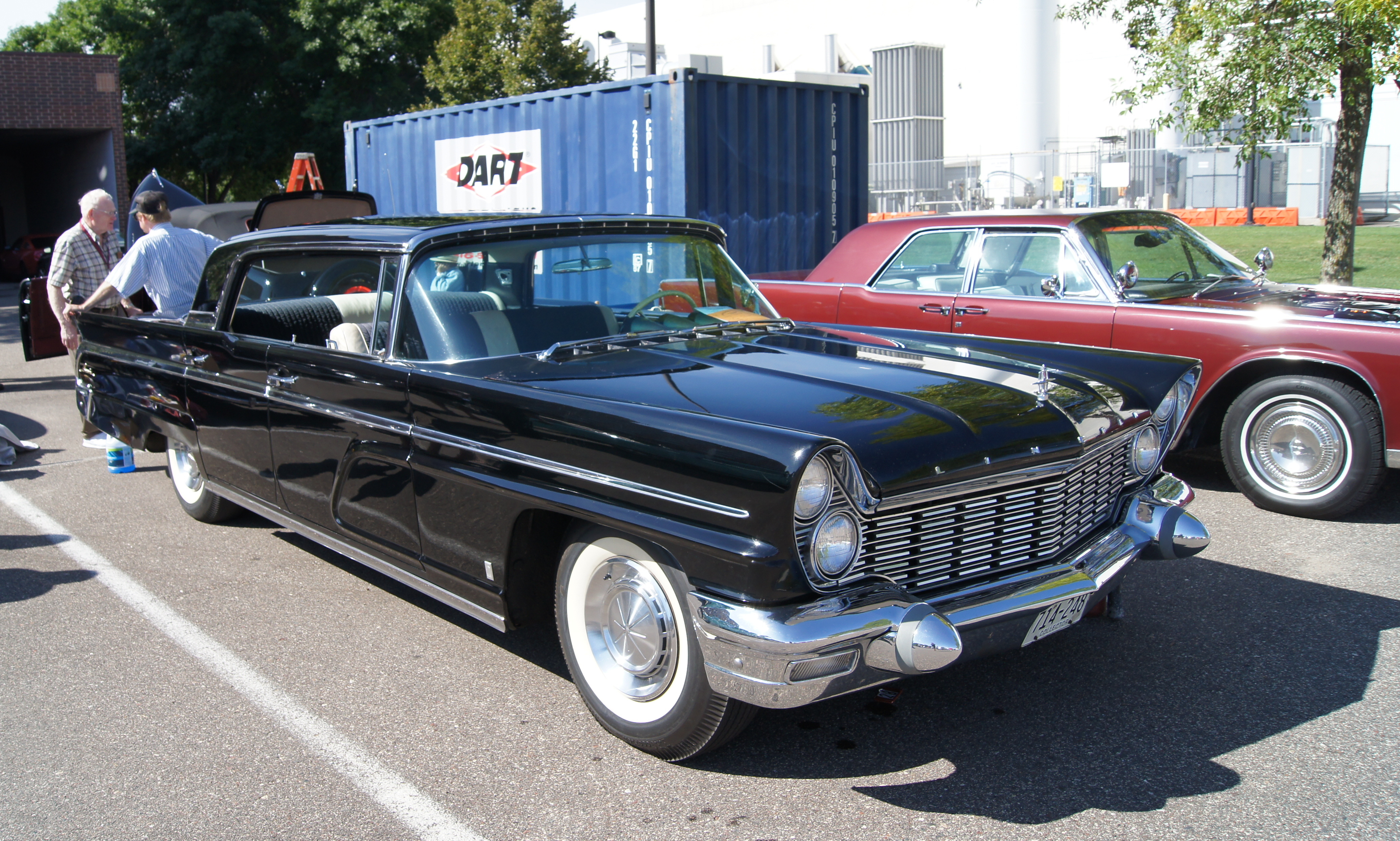
1960 Lincoln Premiere Four-door Landau

1957–1958 Comparison	1957 Premiere	1958 Premiere
Wheelbase	126.0 in (3,200 mm)	131.0 in (3,327 mm)
Overall Length	224.6 in (5,705 mm)	229.0 in (5,817 mm)
Width	80.3 in (2,040 mm)	80.1 in (2,035 mm)
Height	60.2 in (1,529 mm)	56.5 in (1,435 mm)
Front Headroom	35.4 in (899 mm)	35.0 in (889 mm)
Front Legroom	44.8 in (1,138 mm)	44.4 in (1,128 mm)
Front Hip Room	61.7 in (1,567 mm)	61.0 in (1,549 mm)
Front Shoulder Room	59.4 in (1,509 mm)	63.1 in (1,603 mm)
Rear Headroom	34.1 in (866 mm)	33.8 in (859 mm)
Rear Legroom–ins.	42.5 in (1,080 mm)	46.6 in (1,184 mm)
Rear Hip Room	63.8 in (1,621 mm)	65.5 in (1,664 mm)
Rear Shoulder Room	58.4 in (1,483 mm)	63.0 in (1,600 mm)
