= Mercury XM-800 =

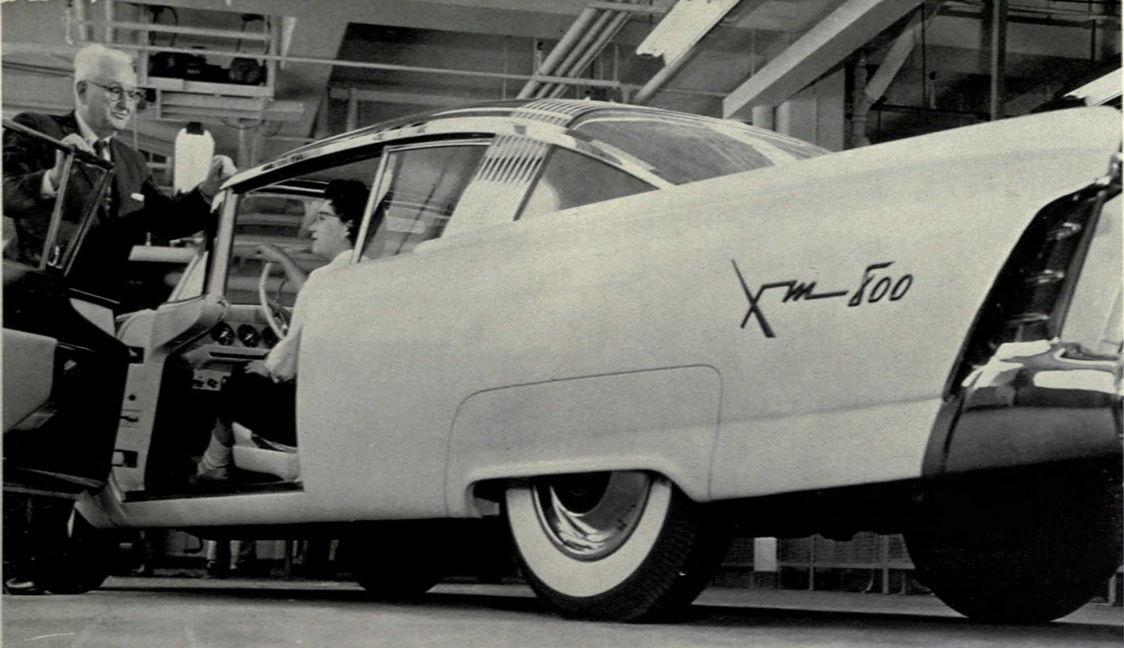
XM-800 at University of Michigan, 1957

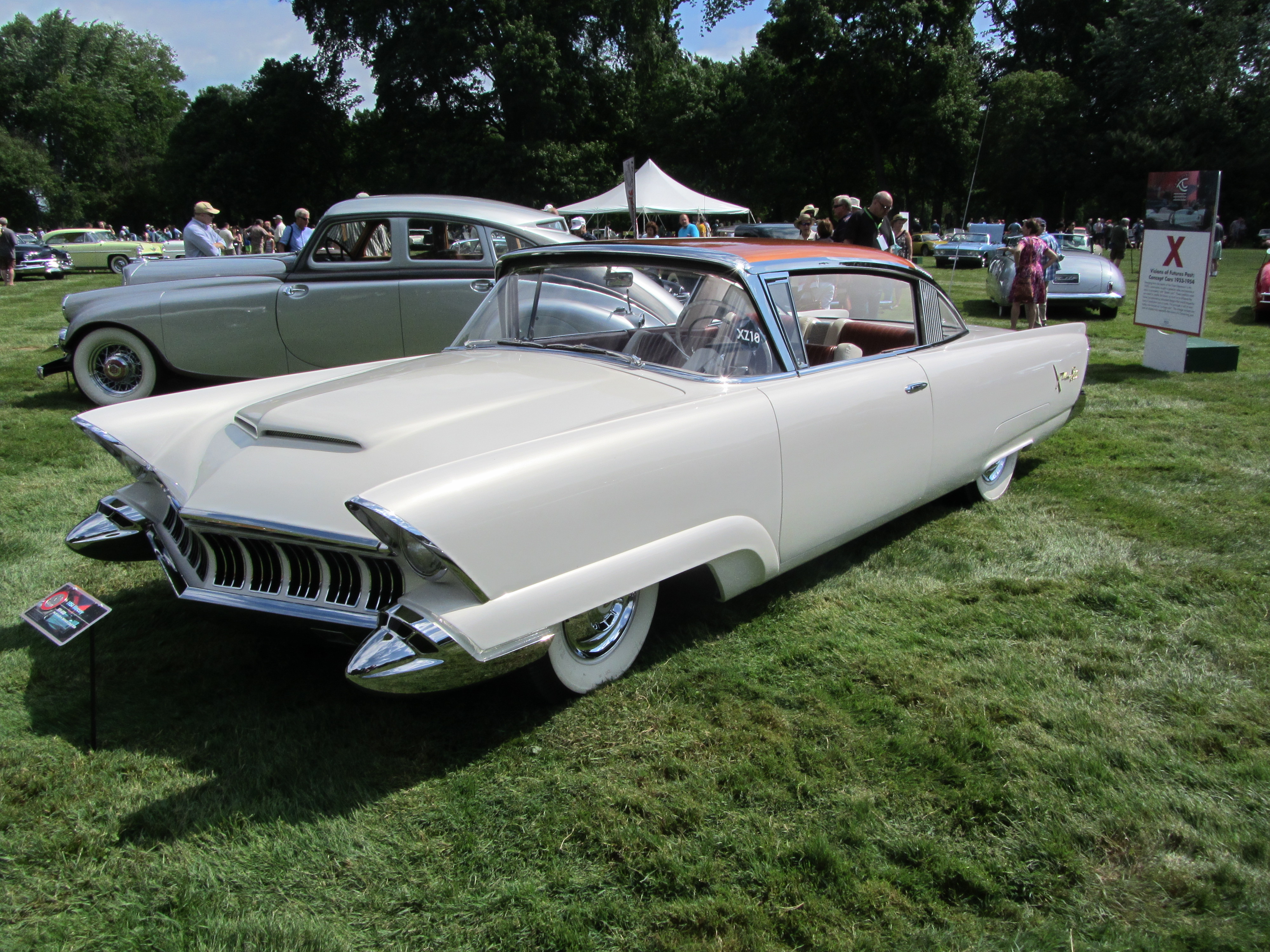
XM-800, 2017

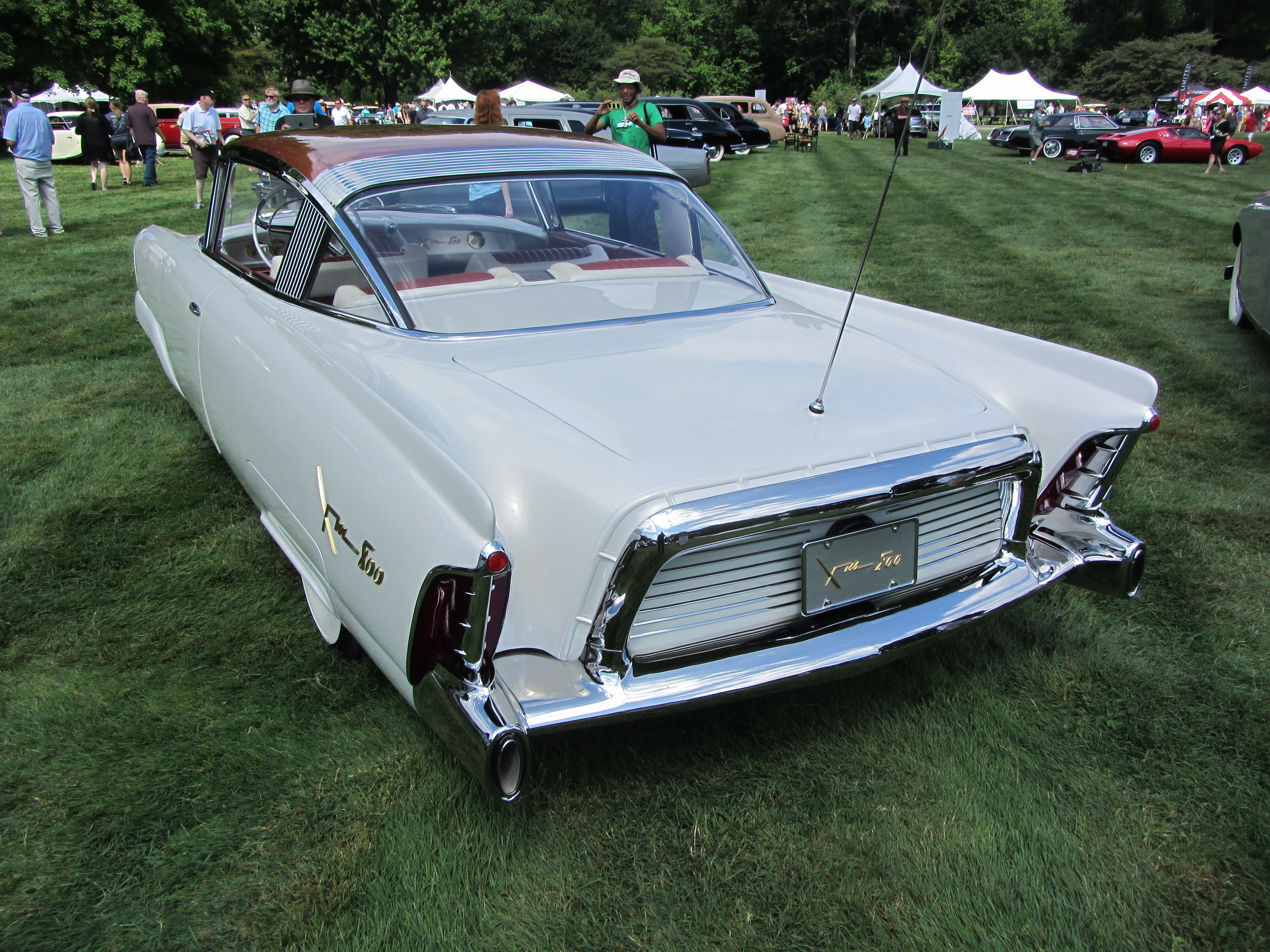
Rear view, 2017

The Mercury XM-800 is a concept car created by Mercury and first introduced at the 1954 Chicago Auto Show. In newspaper publicity at its 1954 debut, in Chicago and elsewhere, it was presented with its full name, Mercury Monterey XM-800. The XM, or experimental Mercury, "push car" (meaning that it was not drivable) went the 1954 US auto show circuit season. Although it was promoted by Ford as an "advanced design, engineered to go into volume production,” the XM 800 never passed the concept phase.

== Background ==
The show car was designed by John Najjar. He was also responsible for the 1955 Lincoln Futura show car and the mid-engine Ford Mustang I experimental sports car of 1962. Much of the car's appearance and styling cues were later used on the Lincoln Premiere, Lincoln Capri, Mercury Montclair, Ford Crown Victoria, and other Ford and Mercury products during the mid-1950s.

The concept model was built by Creative Industries of Detroit on a modified Mercury frame with a 1954 Mercury 312 cu in (5.1 L) V8 engine with dual exhausts. It features a low fiberglass body with much of its trim was also made out of chrome plated fiberglass and an interior with four bucket seats.

In early 1957 Ford donated the XM 800 to the University of Michigan's Automotive Engineering Lab for use in training "future" automotive engineers. A March 1957 article in the campus's student newspaper gives details of the then-recent donation, stating that the vehicle "was styled by William Schmidt of Mercury." After the automotive school closed, the show car was auctioned to a private individual who stored it in a barn, but never returned. It was sold again and stored for almost 30 years before being sold on 2008.

The car was restored and made operational and finally drove under its own power in 2009. Subsequently, the car was auctioned in 2010 for $429,000. It was shown at the 2012 Chicago Auto Show.
