= Lincoln Futura =

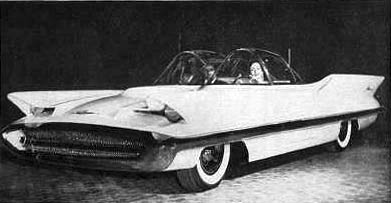
- 1955 Lincoln Futura

Overview
- Manufacturer: Lincoln (Ford)
- Production: 1954 one prototype built
- Assembly: Carrozzeria Ghia, Turin, Italy
- Designer: John Najjar and Bill Schmidt

Body and chassis
- Class: Concept car
- Body style: 2-door coupé
- Layout: Front-engine, rear-wheel-drive

Powertrain
- Engine: 368 cu in (6.0 L) Y-block OHV V8
- Transmission: 3-speed Turbo Drive automatic

Dimensions
- Wheelbase: 126.0 in (3,200.4 mm)
- Length: 227.0 in (5,765.8 mm)
- Width: 84.6 in (2,148.8 mm)
- Height: 58.2 in (1,478.3 mm)

The Lincoln Futura is a concept car promoted by Ford's Lincoln brand, designed by Ford's lead stylists Bill Schmidt and John Najjar, and hand-built by Ghia in Turin, Italy, at a cost of $250,000 (equivalent to $3,000,000 in 2025).

Displayed on the auto show circuit in 1955, the Futura was modified by George Barris into the Batmobile, for the 1966 TV series Batman.

== History ==
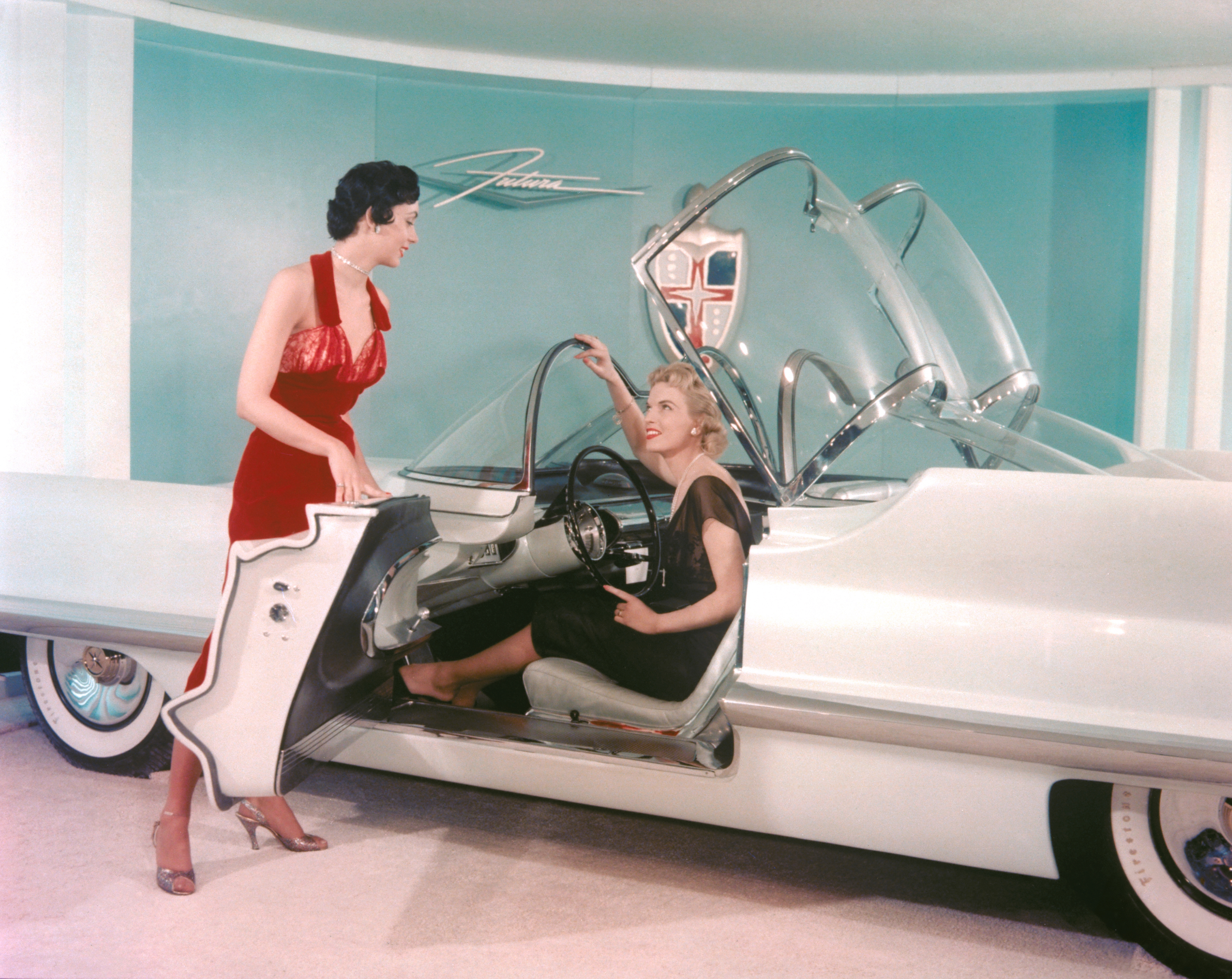
Lincoln Futura

The idea for the Futura came from designer Bill Schmidt, who got the idea while he was diving, after an encounter with a shark.

The car's official public debut was on January 8, 1955, at the Chicago Auto Show; it had been shown to the press at the city's Congress Hotel on January 5. While being displayed elsewhere in the U.S. that spring, the Futura was seen by the country's television audience on Today ("The Today Show") on March 3, 1955. The Futura's styling was original by 1950s standards, with a double, clear-plastic canopy top, exaggerated hooded headlight pods, and very large, outward-canted tailfins. The Futura had a complete powertrain and was fully operable, in contrast to many show cars. Its original color was a pearlescent white, created by one of the first pearlescent color treatments. To achieve the effect Bill Schmidt wanted, Ghia ground and pulverized the scales of thousands of fish and mixed them into the paint.

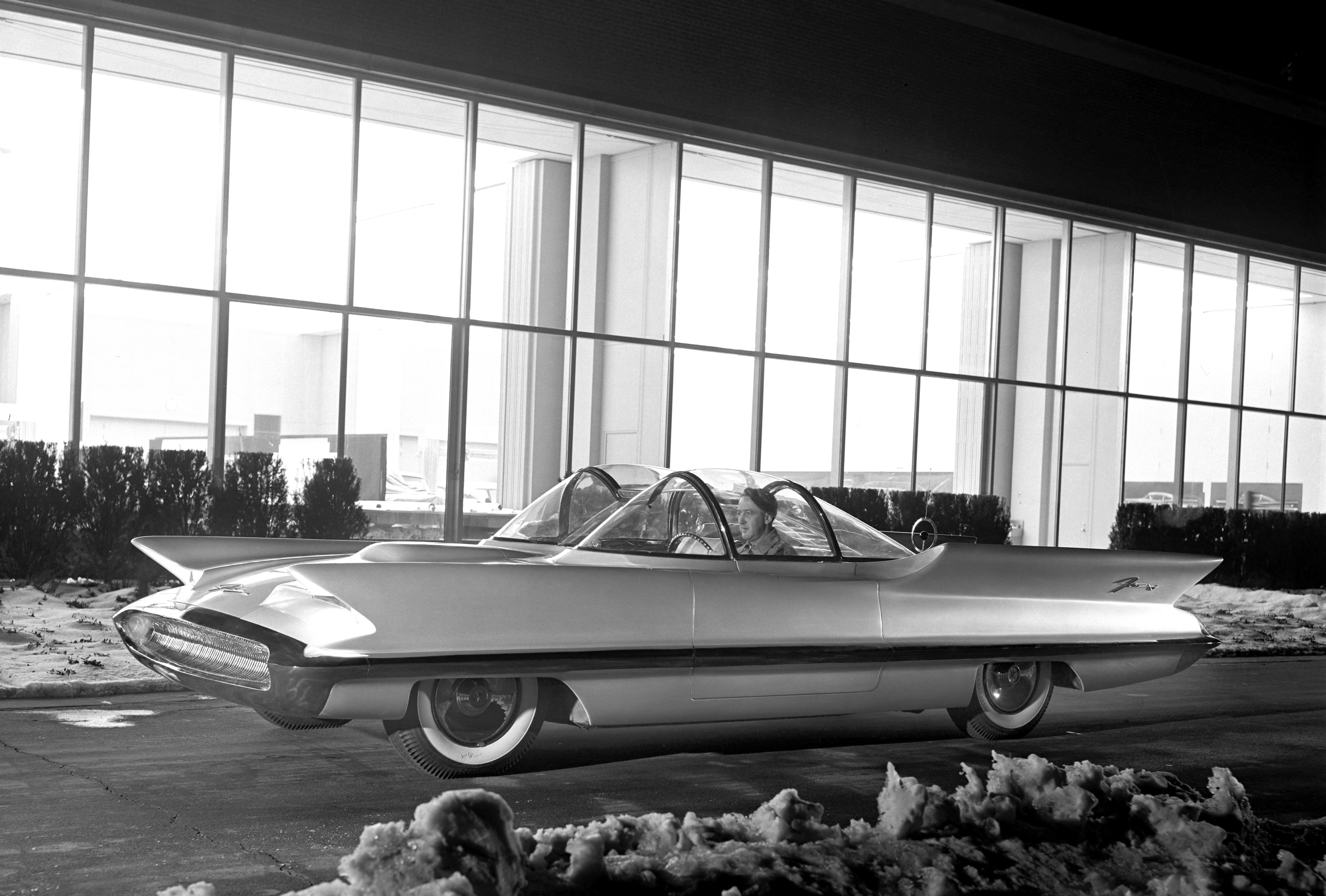
Lincoln Futura in front of the original McCormick Place (1960–1967) in Chicago, Illinois

The Futura was powered by a 368 cubic inch Lincoln engine and powertrain; the chassis was an early prototype Y-shaped backbone perimeter frame that would go into production on the 1956–1957 Continental Mark II.

The Futura was a success as a show car, garnering favorable publicity for Ford, and so was released as a model kit and a toy. In a much more subdued form, its headlight and tailfin motifs would appear on production Lincolns for 1956 and 1957, such as the Lincoln Premiere and Lincoln Capri. The concave front grille inspired the grille on the 1960 Mercury Monterey and the 1960 Ford Galaxie.

The styling showed a progression from the Mercury XM-800 introduced in 1954.

== Media appearances ==
The Futura played a prominent part in the 1959 movie It Started with a Kiss, starring Debbie Reynolds and Glenn Ford. For the movie, it was painted red, as the white pearlescent finish did not photograph well.

The red-painted car is also seen in Ford's 1961 promotional film The Secret Door. The film's look inside Ford's Styling Center includes footage of the Futura on the test track and in the wind tunnel.

The concept car was subsequently sold to auto customizer George Barris. Having originally cost $250,000, the Futura was sold to Barris for $1 and "other valuable consideration" by Ford Motor Company. As the car was never titled and was therefore uninsurable, it was parked behind Barris's shop, sitting idle and deteriorating for several years.

The 1994 NBC TV series Viper featured a red replica of the 1955 Lincoln Futura called "The Baxley". In the episode "Wheels of Fire" (S01E08), the car's creator stole it after it was recovered by construction workers. The vehicle was onscreen for much of the episode and even figured in a chase with the Viper Defender.

=== Batmobile ===
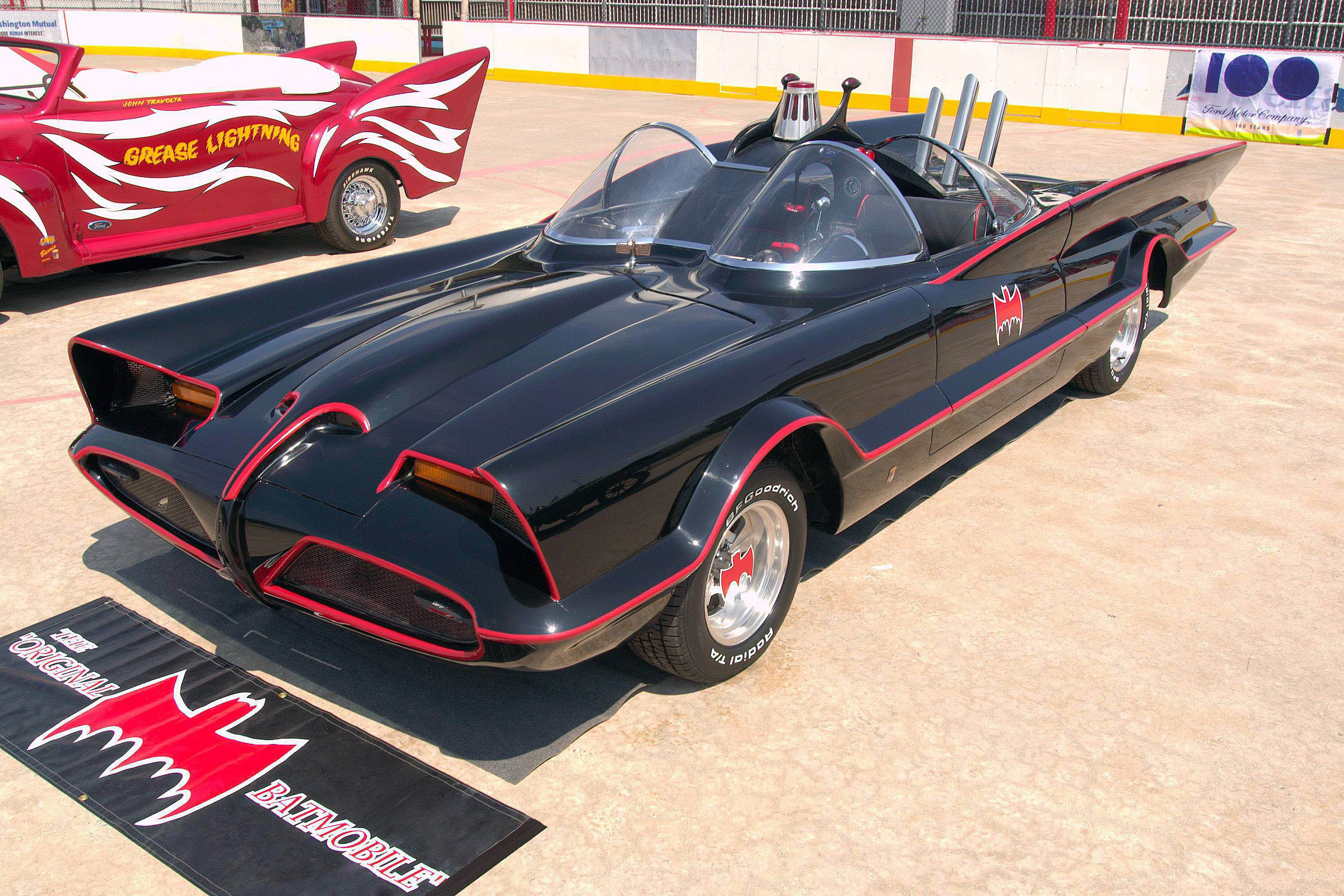
The Batmobile from the 1960s Batman TV series

In 1966, Barris was asked to design a theme car for the Batman television series. Originally, the auto stylist Dean Jeffries was contracted to build the car for the show in late 1965, but when the studio wanted the car sooner than he could deliver, the project was given to Barris. With the short notice, Barris thought the Futura might work well, and using Jeffries's initial car, decided that its unusual, winged shape would be an ideal starting point for the Batmobile. Barris hired Bill Cushenbery to modify the car's metalwork.

Barris went on to build three fiberglass replicas using the frames and running gear from 1966 Ford Galaxie cars for the show circuit. Barris later acquired a fourth replica, a metal car built on a 1958 Ford Thunderbird.

Barris retained ownership of the car after its conversion to the Batmobile, leasing it to the TV studio for filming. After production of the TV series ended, it was displayed in Barris's own museum in California. It has also been displayed in the Cayman Motor Museum on Grand Cayman Island.

Barris sold the Batmobile to Rick Champagne at the Barrett-Jackson collector car auction on Saturday, January 19, 2013, in Scottsdale, Arizona for US$4.62 million.

As of August 2016, Dave Anderson in Fairfax, Virginia, owns the #1 made from the Futura Concept Car and he also owns the #2 car (the first replica that Barris built).

== Replica ==
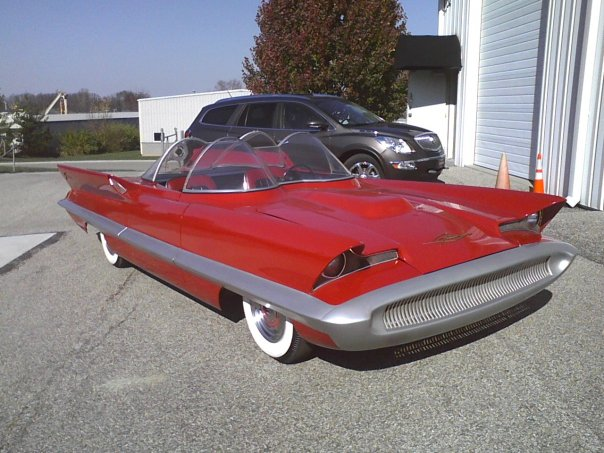
Bob Butts Replica, as seen in Ohio November 7, 2009

In the 1990s, Bob Butts (with George Barris' consent) made replicas of the Batmobile, using a mold of one of the Barris-built replicas. Based on pictures from when the Futura was shown in the 1950s, he reskinned an existing Batmobile replica back into a Lincoln Futura replica. He only created one copy.

The original fiberglass copy shell of the Futura made by Bob Butts was later found by Gotham Garage owner Mark Towle and his friend and actor Shawn Pilot and rebuilt as an original copy of the Lincoln Futura together with his team (Constance Nunes, Tony Quinones, Michael "Caveman" Pyle) in their shop in Temecula, California, as seen in the Netflix series Car Masters: Rust to Riches.

When finished, the replica Futura was eventually sold at the Grand National Roadster Show at the Pomona Fairplex for approximately $90,000.
