= John Najjar =

American automobile designer

- Born: November 11, 1918; Omaha, Nebraska, U.S.
- Died: January 6, 2011 (aged 92); Sarasota, Florida, U.S.
- Employer: Ford Motor Company
- Spouse: Virginia Najjar
- Children: Linda Najjar, Barbara Ramsey Najjar

John Najjar (Arabic: جون نجار; November 11, 1918 – January 6, 2011) was an American designer and executive stylist at Ford Motor Company. He is credited for having co-designed the first prototype of the Ford Mustang known as Ford Mustang I with Philip T. Clark.

== Career ==
Najjar was born to a Greek Orthodox Christian Lebanese family in Omaha, Nebraska. He joined Ford Motor Company's Apprentice School in Dearborn, Michigan. While working there as a machinist, he was approached by Henry Ford during a plant tour who asked him if he enjoyed his work. Najjar's response that he'd "rather be drawing cars" led to an invitation for him to add his talents to Ford's newly created Design Center.

He continued working as a designer for Ford for over 40 years. He worked with E. T. Gregorie, George Walker, Elwood Engel, Gene Bordinat, and Lee Iacocca. For many years his work was centered on futuristic show cars whose revolutionary features later appeared in many Ford, Lincoln and Mercury vehicles.

The Advanced Styling Studio developed the 1962 Ford Mustang I concept car - so named because of Najjar's love for its namesake, the North American P-51 Mustang fighter plane. His design contributions span decades and include the M4A3 Sherman tank and B-24 bomber in the 1940s, the 1957-58 Lincoln Continentals, the Mercury XM-800, the LevaCar concept

Najjar also co-designed jointly with fellow Ford Motor Company stylist Bill Schmidt the groundbreaking Lincoln Futura, a futuristic concept car, which debuted at the 1955 Chicago Auto Show. It that served as a base for the Batmobile for the 1966 TV series Batman, as well as for the first movie adaptation of the Batman comics.

Najjar and his wife Virginia retired to Sarasota, Florida, in 1985. Virginia died on March 29, 2005, while Najjar died on January 26, 2011.
