= List of Mercury vehicles =

This is a list of both production and concept vehicles of the former Mercury division of Ford Motor Company of the United States and Canada.

== Production models ==
Exterior	Name	Year Introduced	Year Discontinued	Platforms	Generations	Vehicle Information
	Eight	1939	1951		3	Mid-range full-size car
	M series	1949	1968		4	Sold in Canada, rebadged Ford F series
	Monterey	1952	1974		7	Full-size car served the flagship, mid-range, and entry-level offerings
	Custom	1952	1956		1	Entry-level full-size car
	Montclair	1955	1968		5	Full-size car
	Medalist	1956	1958		2	Entry-level full-size car
	Colony Park	1957	1991		6	Top tier full-size station wagon
	Commuter	1957	1968		5	Entry level full-size station wagon
	Turnpike Cruiser	1957	1958		1	Flagship full-size car
	Voyager	1957	1958		1	Mid-range full-size station wagon
	Park Lane	1958	1968		2	Flagship full-size car
	Comet	1960	1977		5	Compact (1960–1965, 1971–1977), mid-size car (1966–1969)
	Meteor	1961	1963		2	Full-size (1961), mid-size (1962–1963)
	S-55	1962	1967		2	Full-size
	Marauder	1963	2004		3	High performance version full-size car
	400	1963	1963		1	Canadian version of Mercury Monterey
	Cyclone	1964	1971		5	Mid-range muscle car
	Cougar	1967	2002		8	Pony car (1967–1973), personal luxury car (1974–1997), sports compact (1999–2002)
	Marquis	1967	1986		4	Entry-level full-size luxury car
	Montego	1968	2007		3	Intermediate (1968–1976), full-size (2004–2007)
	Capri	1970	1994		3	Sports car (1970–1977), pony car (1979–1986), roadster (1991–1994)
	Bobcat	1974	1980		1	Subcompact car, rebadged Ford Pinto. Sold in Canada since 1974, and in the United States since 1975
	Grand Marquis	1975	2011		3	Top-tier full-size car
	Monarch	1975	1980		1	Compact near-luxury car
	Zephyr	1978	1983		1	Compact car
	Topaz	1984	1994		2	Compact, rebadged Ford Tempo
	Sable	1986	2009		5	Mid-size (1986–2005), full-size (2008–2009)
	Tracer	1988	1999		3	Subcompact (1988–1989), compact (1991–1999)
	Lynx	1981	1987		1	Hatchback / station wagon, rebadged Ford Escort
	LN7	1982	1983		1	Compact car, rebadged Ford EXP
	Villager	1992	2002		2	Minivan
	Mystique	1995	2000		1	Compact sedan, rebadged Ford Mondeo
	Mountaineer	1997	2010		3	Mid-size SUV
	Mariner	2004	2010		2	Compact crossover SUV
	Monterey	2004	2007		1	Minivan
	Milan	2006	2011		1	Mid-size car

== Concept cars ==
- Mercury Antser (1980)
- Mercury Astron (1966)
- Mercury Bahamian (1953)
- Mercury Capri Guardsman (1980)
- Mercury Comet Cyclone Sportster (1965)
- Mercury Comet Escapade (1966)
- Mercury Comet Fastback (1964)
- Mercury Comet Super Cyclone (1964)
- Mercury Concept 50 (1988)
- Mercury Concept One (1989)
- Mercury Cougar El Gato (1970)
- Mercury Cougar Eliminator (1999)
- Mercury Cougar S (1999)
- Mercury Cyclone (1990)
- Mercury Cyclone Super Spoiler (1969)
- Mercury D528 "Beldone" (1955)
- Mercury Escapade (1965)
- Mercury Fusion (1996)
- Mercury Gametime Villager (1999)
- Mercury L'Attitude (1997)
- Mercury LeGrand Marquis (1968)
- Mercury LN7 PPG (1981)
- Mercury Marauder Convertible (2002)
- Mercury MC2 (1997)
- Mercury MC4 (1997)
- Mercury Messenger (2003)
- Mercury Meta One (2005)
- Mercury Montego Sportshauler (1971)
- Mercury My (1999)
- Mercury Mystique (concept), (1991)
- Mercury One (1989)
- Mercury Palomar (1962)
- Mercury Premys (1994)
- Mercury Super Marauder (1964)
- Mercury Vanster (1985)
- Mercury Wrist Twist Park Lane (1965)
- Mercury XM-800 (1954)
- Mercury XM (1979)
- Mercury XM-Turnpike Cruiser (1956)
