= Mercury Montclair =

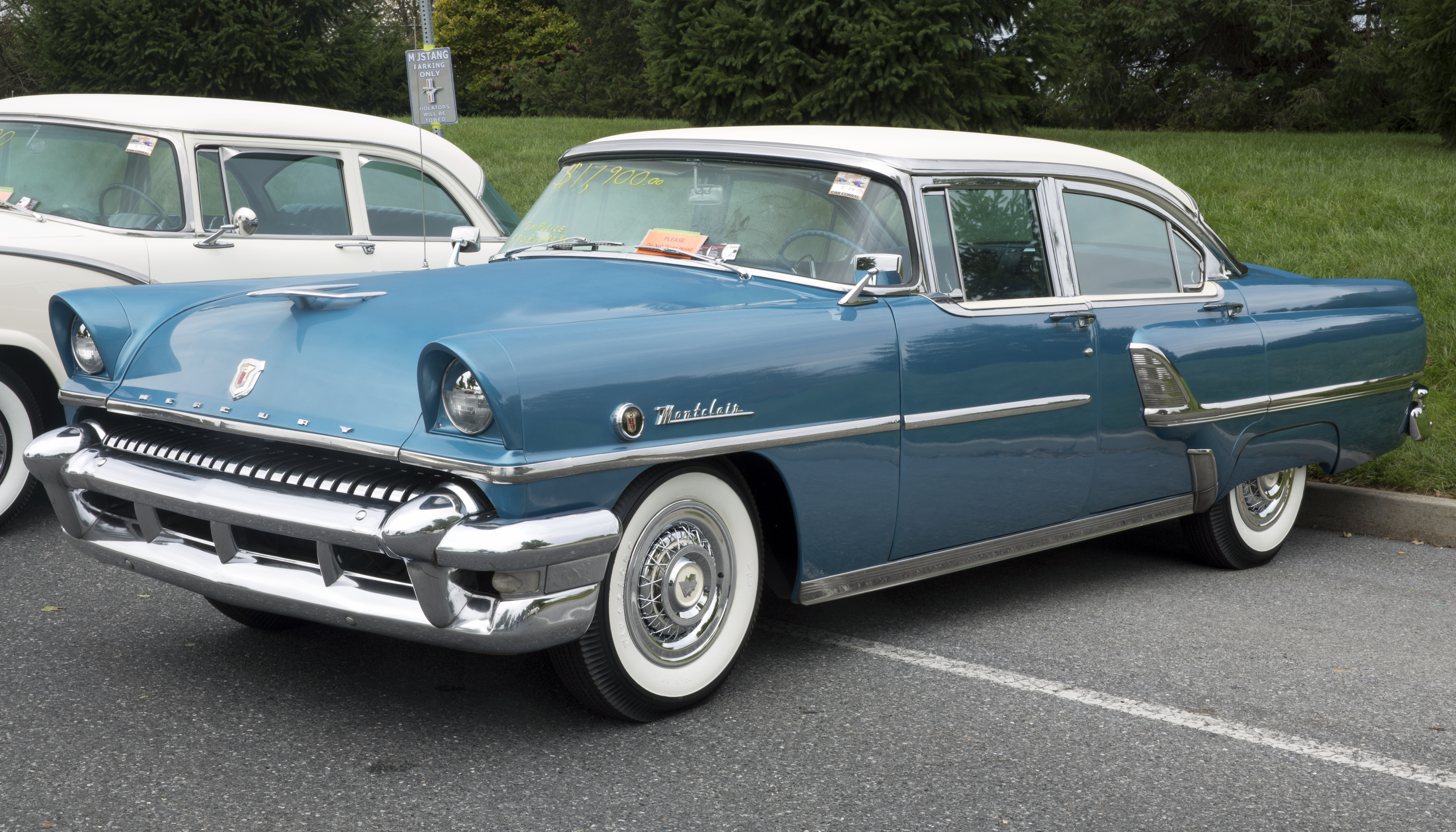
- 1955 Mercury Montclair sedan

Overview
- Manufacturer: Mercury (Ford)
- Production: 1955–1960; 1964–1968
- Assembly: Main plant Wayne, Michigan (Branch assembly); St. Louis, Missouri; Maywood, California; Pico Rivera, California; Metuchen, New Jersey

Body and chassis
- Class: Full-size
- Body style: 2-door coupe 4-door sedan 2-door convertible 2-door hardtop 4-door hardtop
- Layout: FR layout
- Related: Lincoln Capri; Lincoln Premiere; Mercury Monterey; Mercury Medalist; Mercury Custom

Dimensions
- Length: 211 in (5,359 mm) (1957)

Chronology
- Successor: Mercury Monterey Custom

The Mercury Montclair is a series of full-size sedans that were manufactured and marketed over five generations by the Mercury division of Ford. The nameplate was used by the division twice, from the 1955 to the 1960 model years and from the 1964 to the 1968 model years. The model was offered as two-door and four-door hardtops, four-door pillared sedan, and a two-door convertible.

Through its production, the Montclair typically served as the mid-range Mercury sedan offering; always slotted above the Monterey, at various times, the Montclair was slotted below the Turnpike Cruiser and Park Lane in the Mercury line. While the true origins of the nameplate are unknown by Ford historians, the consensus is that is derived from Montclair, New Jersey, an affluent community located near its then-new Mahwah Assembly facility.

For 1969, Mercury discontinued the Montclair, repackaging the vehicle as the Mercury Monterey Custom, which was marketed through 1974.

== First generation (1955–1956) ==
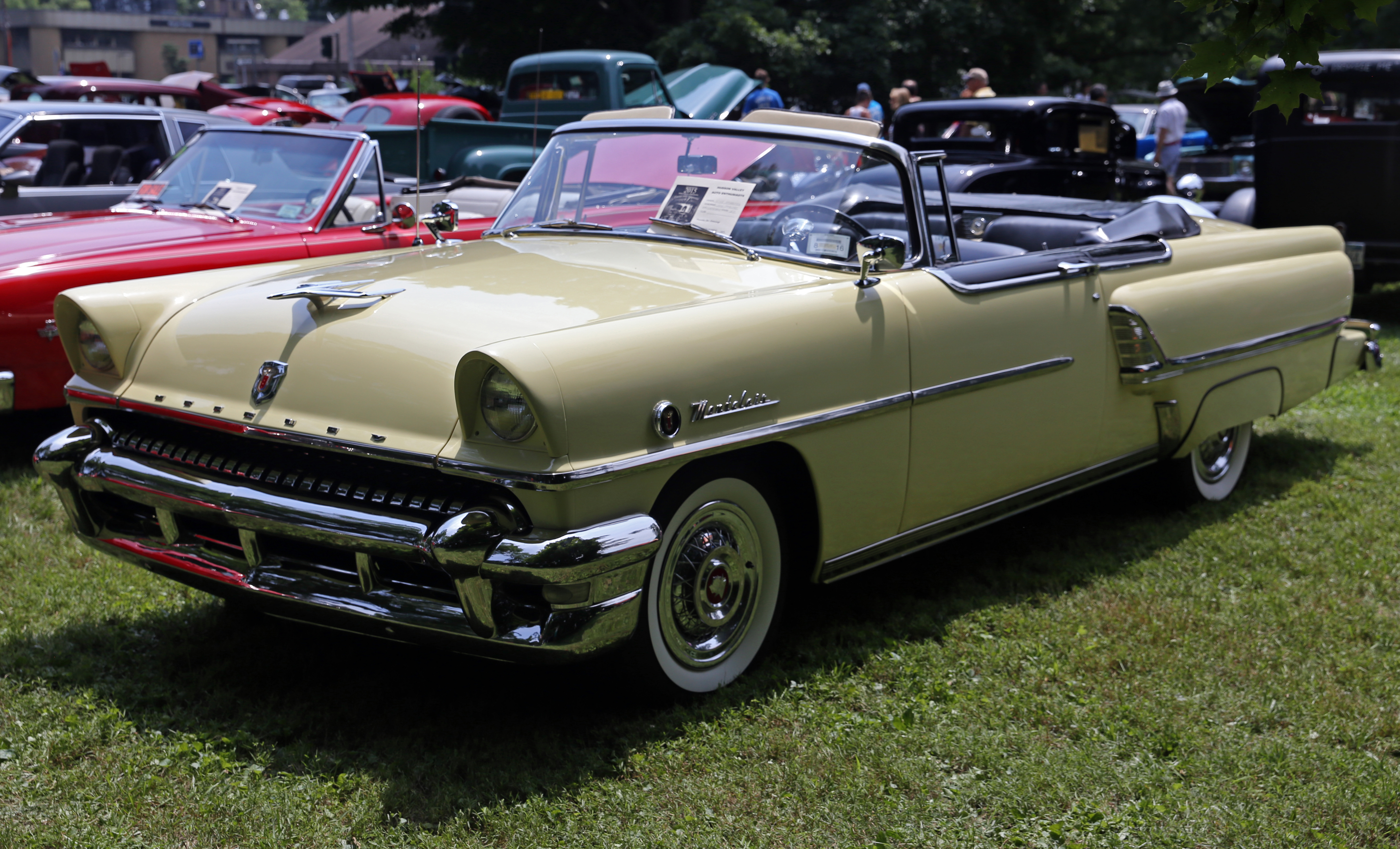
1955 Mercury Montclair Convertible

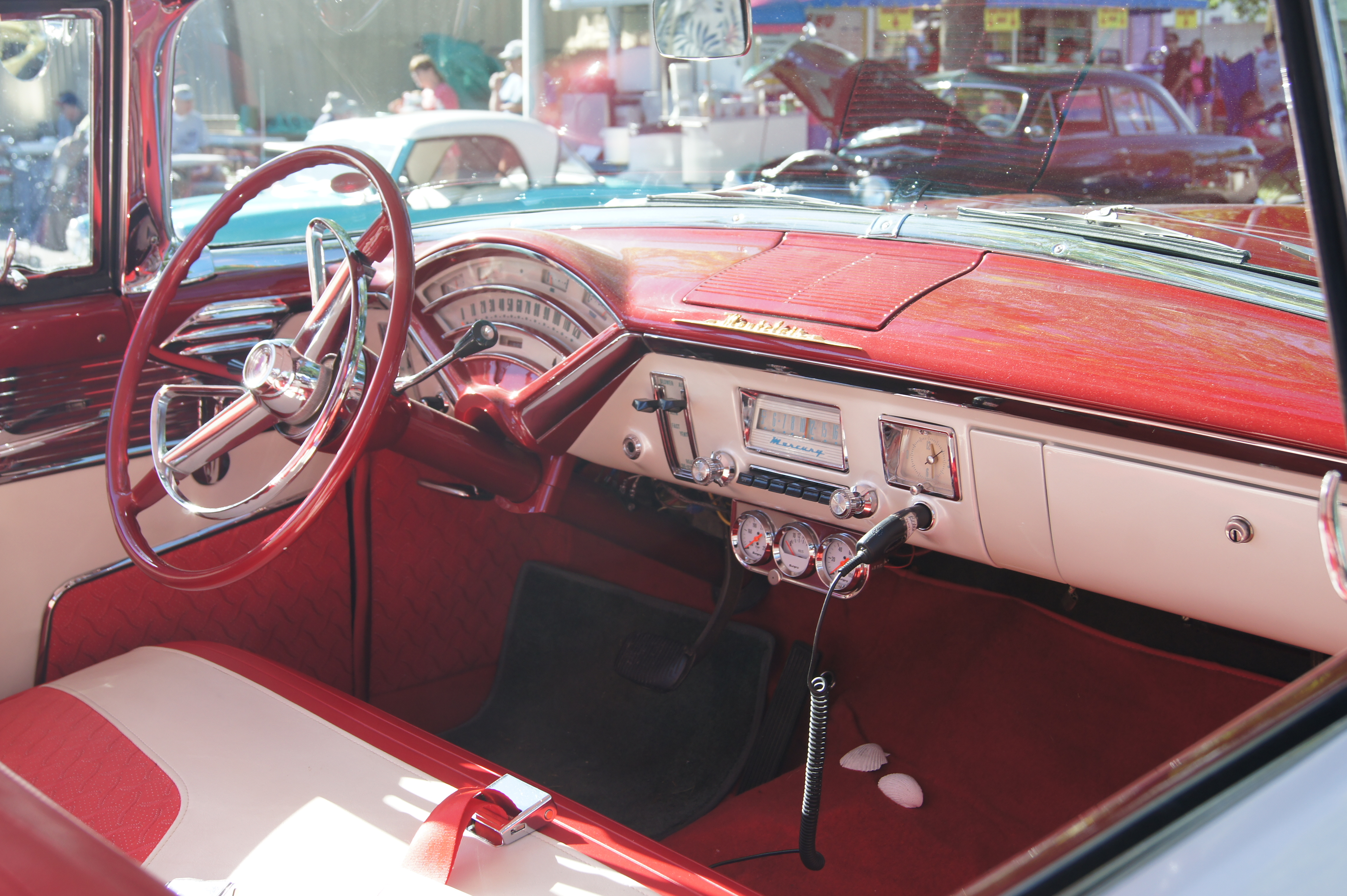
1955 Mercury Montclair interior

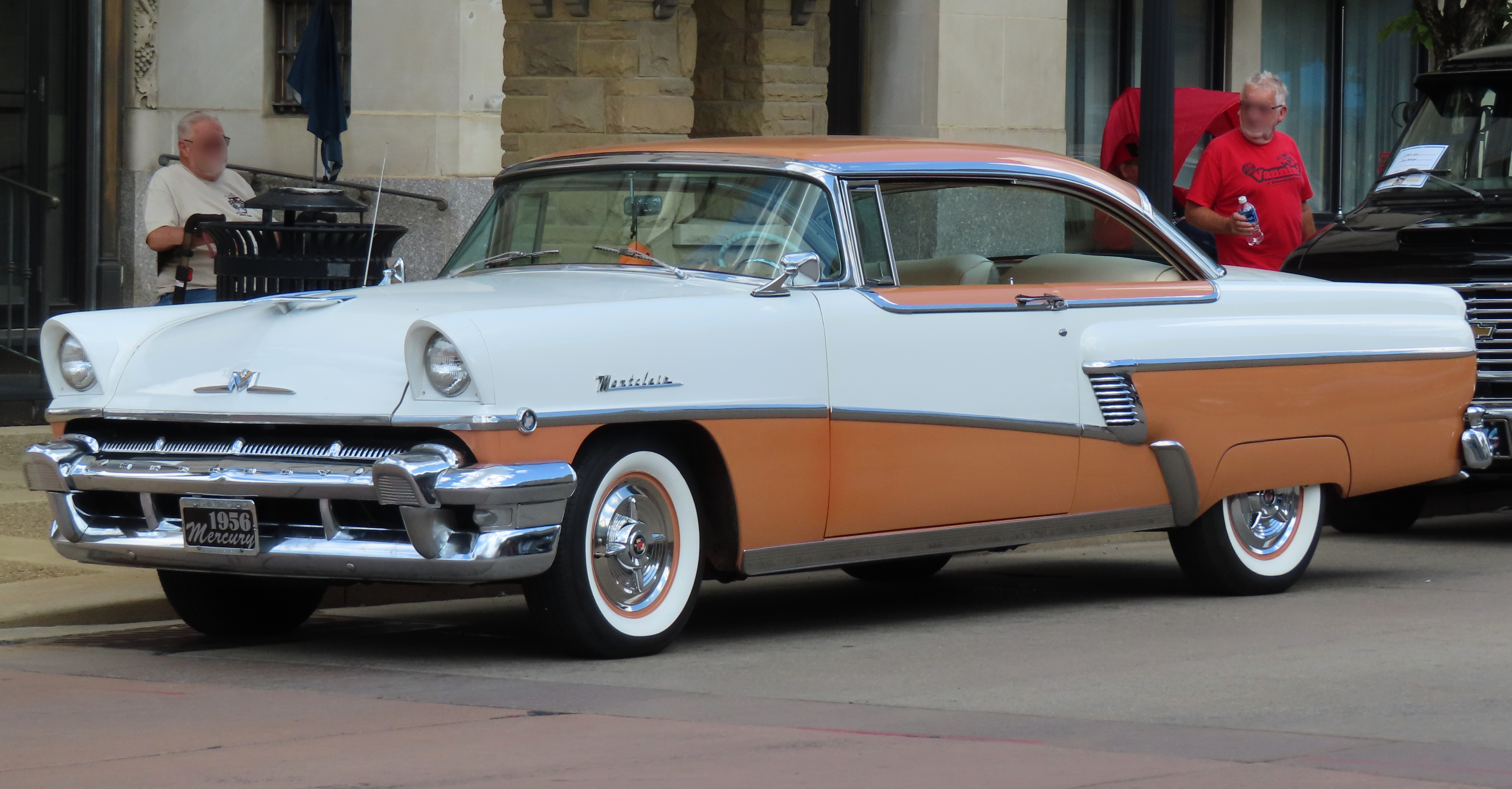
1956 Mercury Montclair 2-door hardtop with "Flo-tone" paint combination

For 1955, Mercury redesigned its model line, adding the Montclair as a premium sedan line above the Monterey. Alongside a four-door sedan (sharing a different roofline from the Monterey), the Montclair was introduced in a two-door hardtop and two-door convertible configuration. As a styling feature, the Montclair received a color-contrast panel below the window line (typically color-coordinated with the roof). A 292 cubic-inch V8 adopted from the new Ford Thunderbird roadster produced 195 hp; along with a 3-speed manual transmission, a 3-speed automatic was offered as an option. The listed retail price for the 1955 2-door Hardtop Coupe was US$2,631 ($31,621 in 2025 dollars) and sold 71,588. Standard equipment included cloth and vinyl upholstery, full interior carpeting, and chrome window surround mouldings; among the options were a heater and windshield defroster, radio, power adjustable front seat, power windows, power steering, power brakes and auxiliary road lamps.

For 1956, Mercury sedans underwent an exterior revision. The side trim was revised to a full-length multi-tier chrome spear, with two types of two-tone paint combinations, offering the traditional approach of a roof color over a different body color, and "Flo-tone" where the roof and lower body were painted in one color and the upper body painted in another color. There were a total of thirty-one two-tone combinations and twenty-eight "Flo-tone" combinations. The Montlair offered a special paint appearance where the areas immediately below the side windows were painted in the color of the roof, or if the "Flo-tone" appearance was used, the color of the roof and lower body panels. On the hood the crest badge was replaced by a "Big M" emblem.

The update brought several functional revisions, including a 12-volt electric system, which allowed the installation of such power operated accessories as air conditioning, standard dual exhaust to improve engine performance, and an automatic self-lubrication system (for the steering and front suspension). Mercury added its own version of the Ford Lifeguard safety system; a deep-dish steering wheel was standard, along with safety door locks, tubeless tires, and a breakaway safety glass rearview mirror. In addition, childproof rear door locks, seatbelts, and a padded dashboards were introduced as free-standing options.

The 292 cubic-inch V8 was increased to 312 cu in, producing 225 hp (168 kW). Starting in 1956 an optional dual 4-barrel carburetor version provided 260 hp (190 kW). The 3-speed manual or the optional 3-speed Merc-O-Matic automatic transmission continued, while an additional Touch-O-Matic overdrive was offered separately.

=== Sun Valley ===
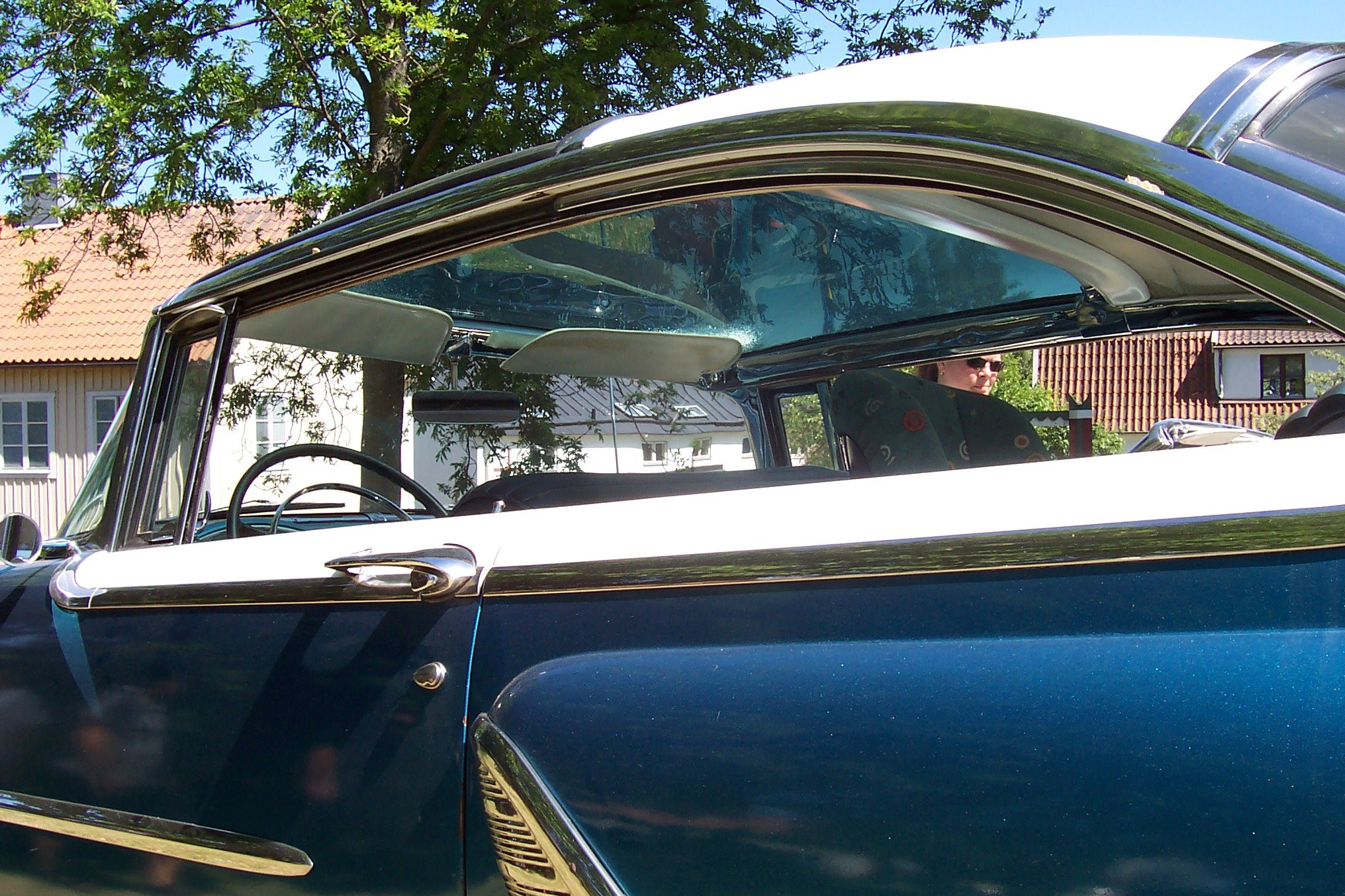
Roof panel view of Mercury Montclair Sun Valley

For 1955, the Montclair model line offered the Sun Valley, succeeding the Monterey Sun Valley from 1954. In line with the Ford Fairlane Crown Victoria Skyliner, the front half of the roof was a tinted Plexiglas panel; in contrast to the pillared Skyliner, the Sun Valley was a hardtop.

While transparent roofs had been a styling feature of multiple 1950s concept cars (including the Lincoln Futura), the design as a production feature was not widely accepted by consumers, who found interior heat buildup in the vehicle during the summer unacceptable, particularly as air conditioning was not offered as a factory-supplied option until 1956. In total, only 1,787 Sun Valleys were produced.

== Second generation (1957–1958) ==
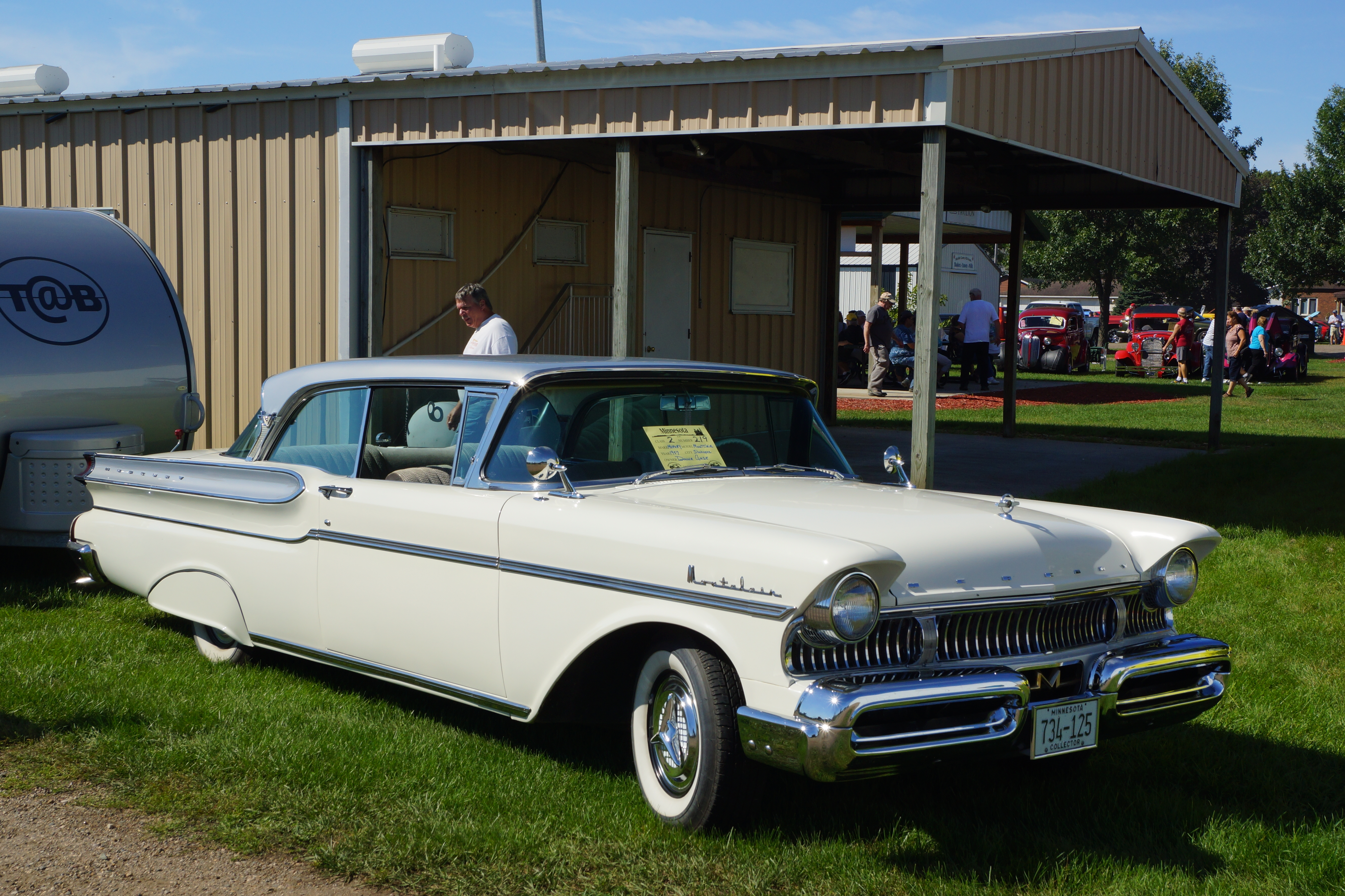
1957 Mercury Montclair 2-door hardtop

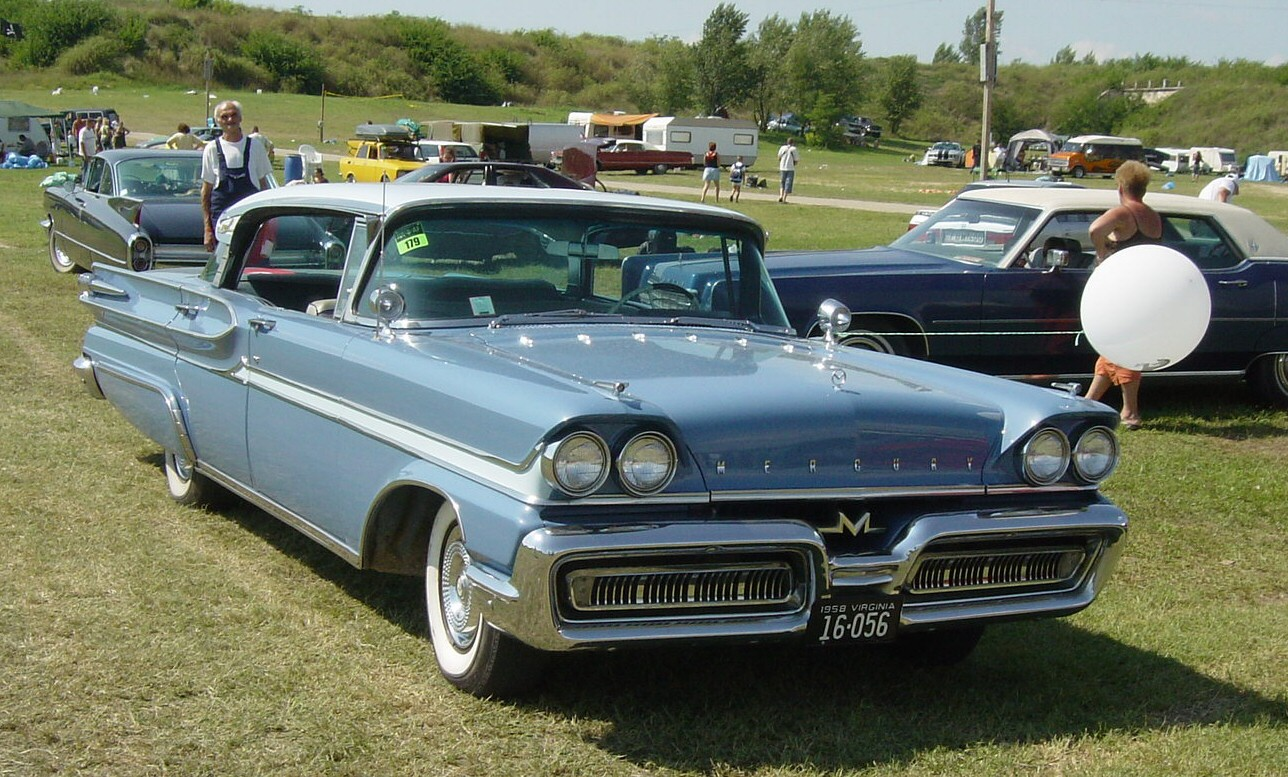
1958 Mercury Montclair Phaeton 4-door hardtop

For 1957, Mercury again revised its sedan line, with the Montclair becoming its mid-range offering, now slotted below the newly introduced Turnpike Cruiser. Mercurys grew in size, shifting to a 122-inch wheelbase, adopting a perimeter style frame, designed to accommodate a lower, wider body which allowed for a lower floor, and elevating all Mercury products above the new Edsel.

The model line underwent a revision, as the Montclair four-door pillared sedan now shared its roofline with the Monterey. Alongside the two-door hardtop, a four-door hardtop was introduced, with both versions now designated as Montclair Phaetons; a Montclair convertible was offered. The 312 V8 was carried over from 1956, retuned to 255 hp. From the Turnpike Cruiser, the 368 cubic-inch V8 was offered as an option, producing 290 hp. A three speed manual transmission was standard, while the optional 3-speed automatic adopted pushbutton shift controls that was not related to the ill-fated electric solenoid controlled Teletouch used by Edsel. Mercury offered mechanically activated pushbutton transmission controls in response to the Chrysler TorqueFlite pushbutton controls introduced in 1956. The Mercury control buttons initially offered five buttons and was called "Keyboard Control", with a long button on top labeled "Drive" with four smaller buttons below labeled "Brake", "Neutral Start" which would allow the engine to start with the ignition key, "Hill Control" and "Reverse" with later versions separating the "Drive" button to "Performance" and "Cruising" for 1958 and relabeled as "Multi-Drive". A separate push/pull lever was included below the control buttons labeled "Park" which would lock out the control buttons until the Park button was pulled to release it. The control panel was installed to the left of the steering wheel. In 1959 the keyboard control was discontinued in favor of a standard steering column mounted gear selector lever.

For 1958, the Montclair remained the mid-level Mercury, now slotted below the newly introduced Mercury Park Lane, with the Turnpike Cruiser returning as a Montclair trim level (including its larger windshield and retractable rear window). The 312 V8 was replaced by a 383 cubic-inch V8, producing 330 hp; as a special-order option, a 430 cubic-inch "Super Marauder" V8, producing 400 hp (the first American series-produced engine to reach that output level) was offered.

== Third generation (1959–1960) ==
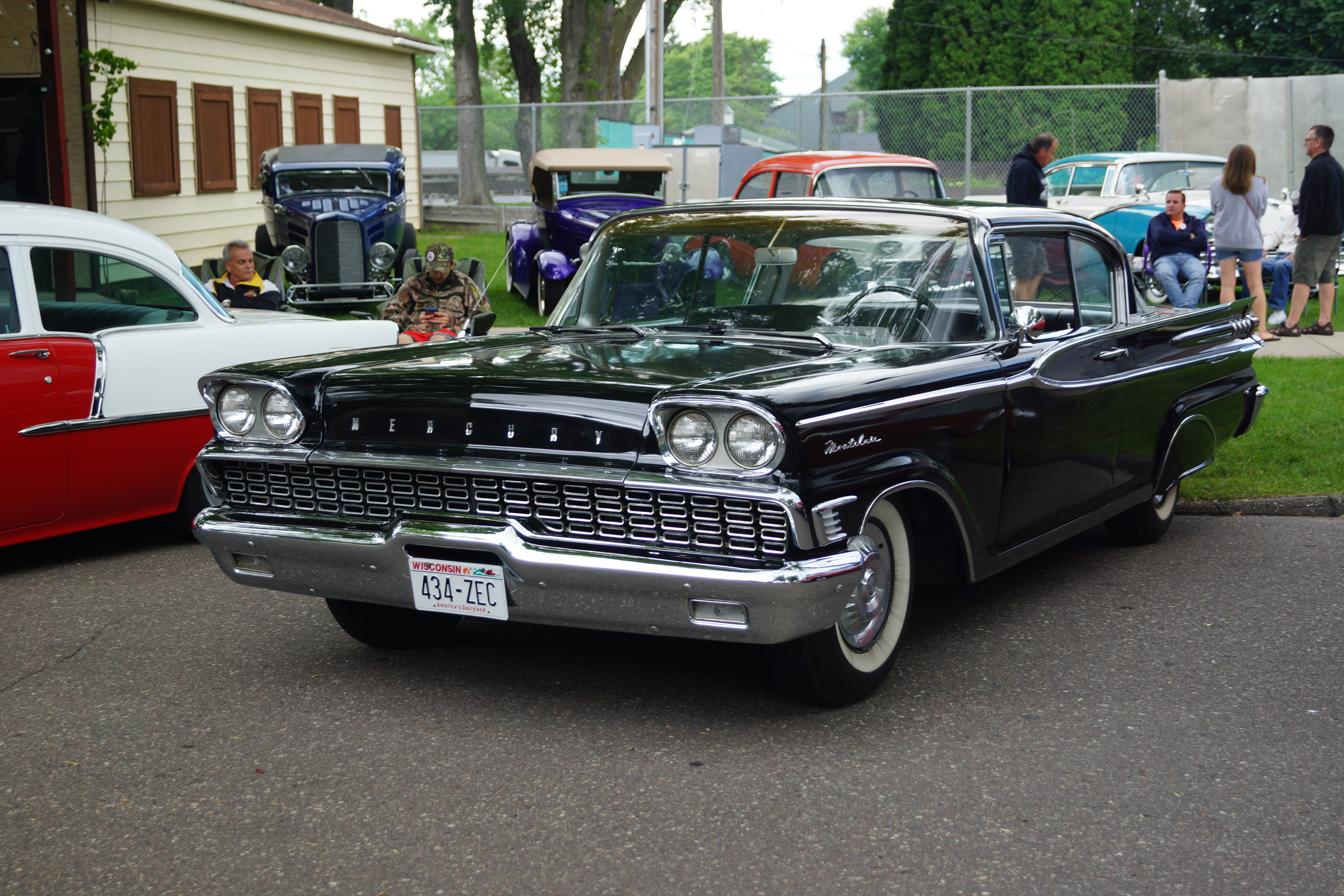
1959 Mercury Montclair 2-door Hardtop Cruiser

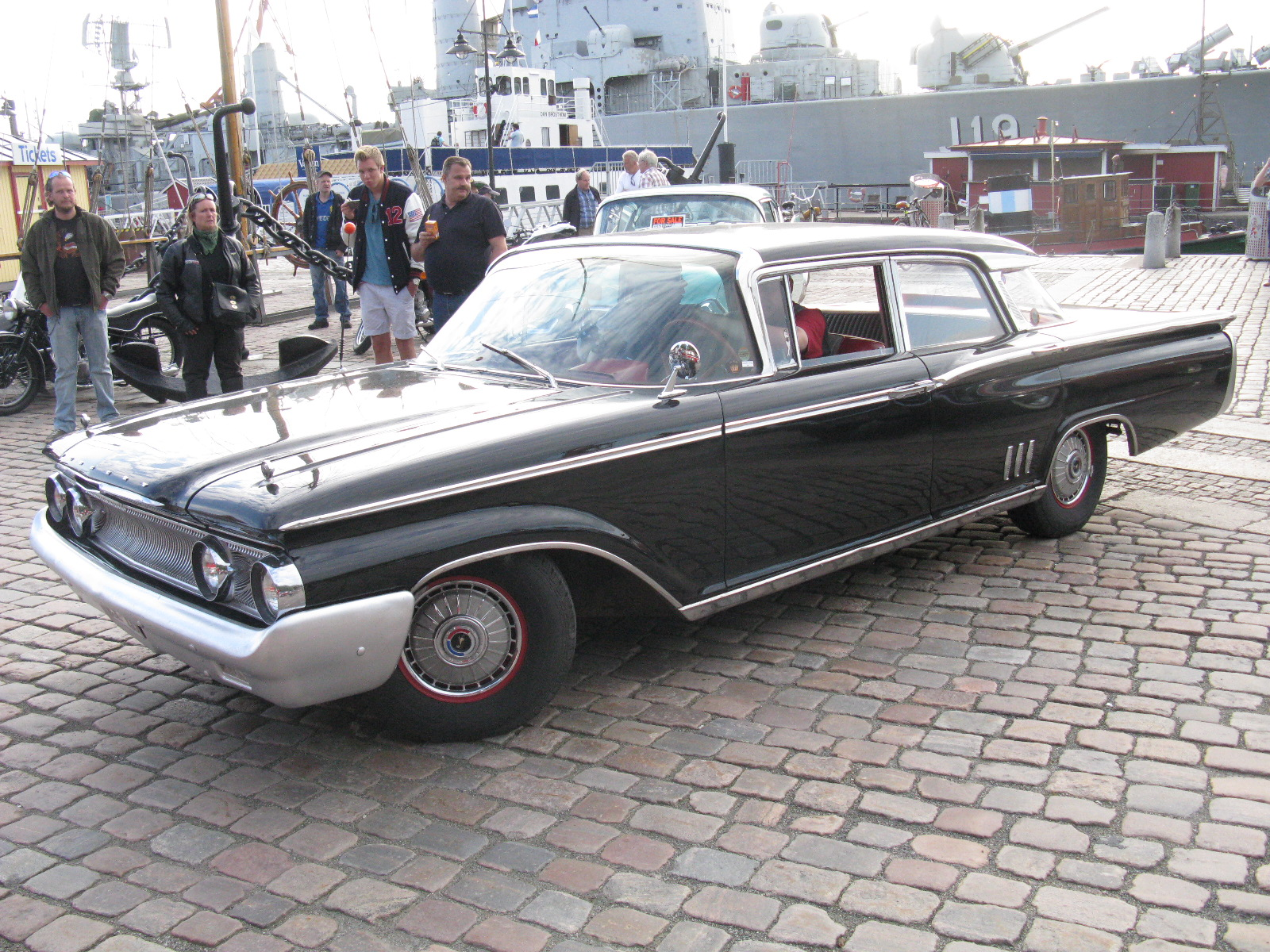
1960 Mercury Montclair 4-door sedan

The Mercury model line underwent a ground-up redesign for 1959, as the Montclair expanded to a 126-inch wheelbase. Following the cancellation of the Edsel Corsair and Edsel Citation (which shared bodies with Mercury), the division used a body and chassis exclusive to the division (for the first time since 1940). The Phaeton and Turnpike Cruiser trims were discontinued, along with the convertible, with the Montclair model line pared down to a four-door pillared sedan, along with two-door and four-door hardtops. Across the Mercury line, hardtops were styled as a Cruiser semi-fastback, including a larger compound-curve rear window (replacing the retractable design of the Turnpike Cruiser). The Super Marauder V8 was discontinued, with the 383 V8 (retuned to 322 hp) becoming the only engine. In another change, automatic transmissions became standard on the Montclair; while the pushbutton "Keyboard Control" was retired (in favor of a conventional column-mounted shifter), the Multi-Drive dual-range transmission remained an option.

One of the largest cars ever produced by the Mercury division, the 1959 Montclair was criticized by owners for lack of interior room (relative to its size), poor fuel economy, and its windshield design.

For 1960, Mercury sedan underwent their second major exterior revision in two years, adopting more restrained styling (nearly removing the tailfins altogether). The Montclair Cruiser two-door and four-door hardtops were carried over, along with the four-door Montclair sedan. Shared with the Colony Park and the Park Lane, the 430 V8 made its return as the standard engine (retuned to 310 hp).

=== Discontinuation ===
For the 1961 model year, in response to Ford's cancellation of Edsel and subsequent consolidation, both the Mercury and Lincoln brands underwent a substantial revision of their model lines. Mercury discontinued the Montclair and Park Lane in favor of the Monterey as its primary sedan line, joined by the full-size Meteor and the compact Comet, two designs originally intended for production as Edsels.

In addition, the 1961 Mercury (both the Monterey and Meteor) adopted a Ford bodyshell and chassis (using its own wheelbase and slightly modified styling). Until the closure of the division after 2010, Mercury full-size sedans were variants of the full-size Ford model line.

== Fourth generation (1964) ==
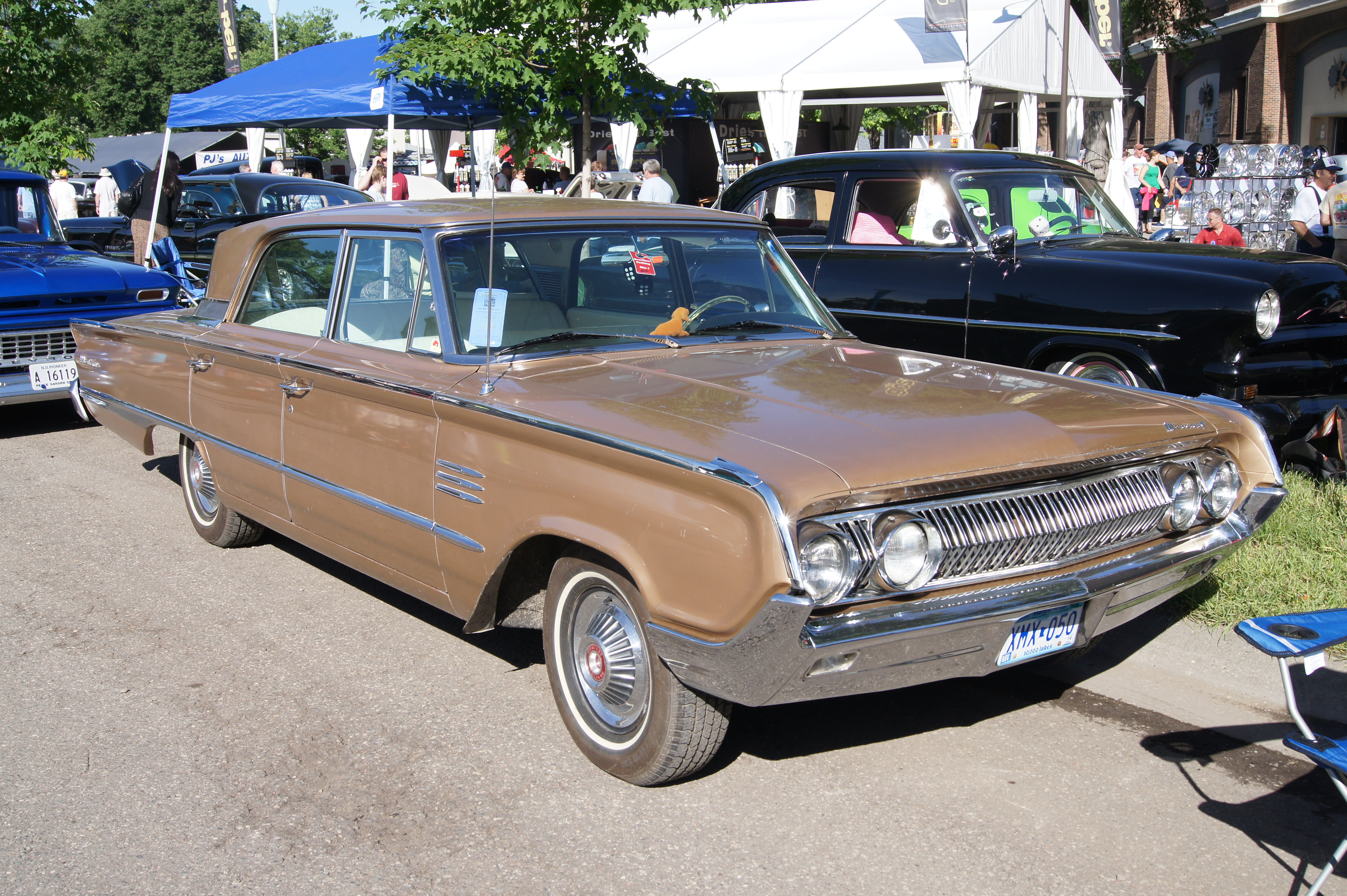
1964 Mercury Montclair 4-door sedan (with Breezeway roof)

For 1964, the Montclair nameplate was revived, again as the mid-level full-size Mercury sedan (this time positioned between the Monterey and a revived Park Lane). The 1964 Mercurys underwent a minor facelift, as a convex grille replaced the previous concave design, an appearance shared with the 1961 Thunderbird and the 1961 Lincoln Continental. As with the previous generation, the Montclair was offered in four-door sedan and two-door and four-door hardtop designs. On hardtops, two notchback rooflines were offered, the "Breezeway" configuration (with a reverse-slant retractable rear window) or a more conventional "Marauder" configuration; all four-door Montclair pillared sedans had the Breezeway roof.

Using a 120-inch wheelbase (one inch longer than Ford sedans), the 1964 Mercury Montclair was equipped with a 390 cubic-inch V8, producing 266 hp. Optional versions of the 390 produced 300 or 330 hp; a 427 cubic-inch V8 was offered with either 410 or 425 hp. The standard engine was offered only with an automatic transmission, with 3 and 4-speed manual transmissions offered as options (the latter, standard on the manual-only 427 V8).

== Fifth generation (1965–1968) ==
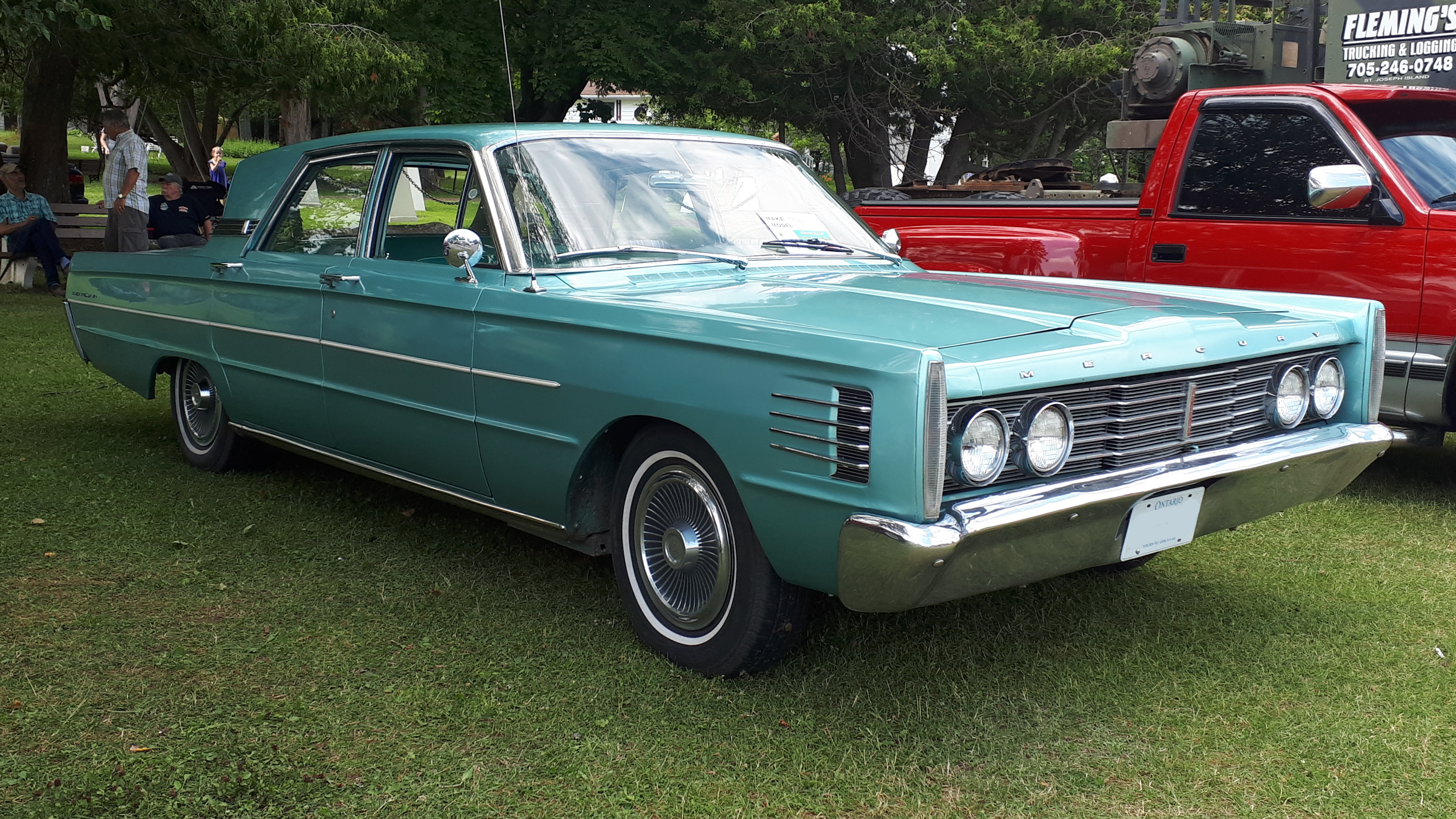
1965 Mercury Montclair 4-door sedan (Breezeway roof)

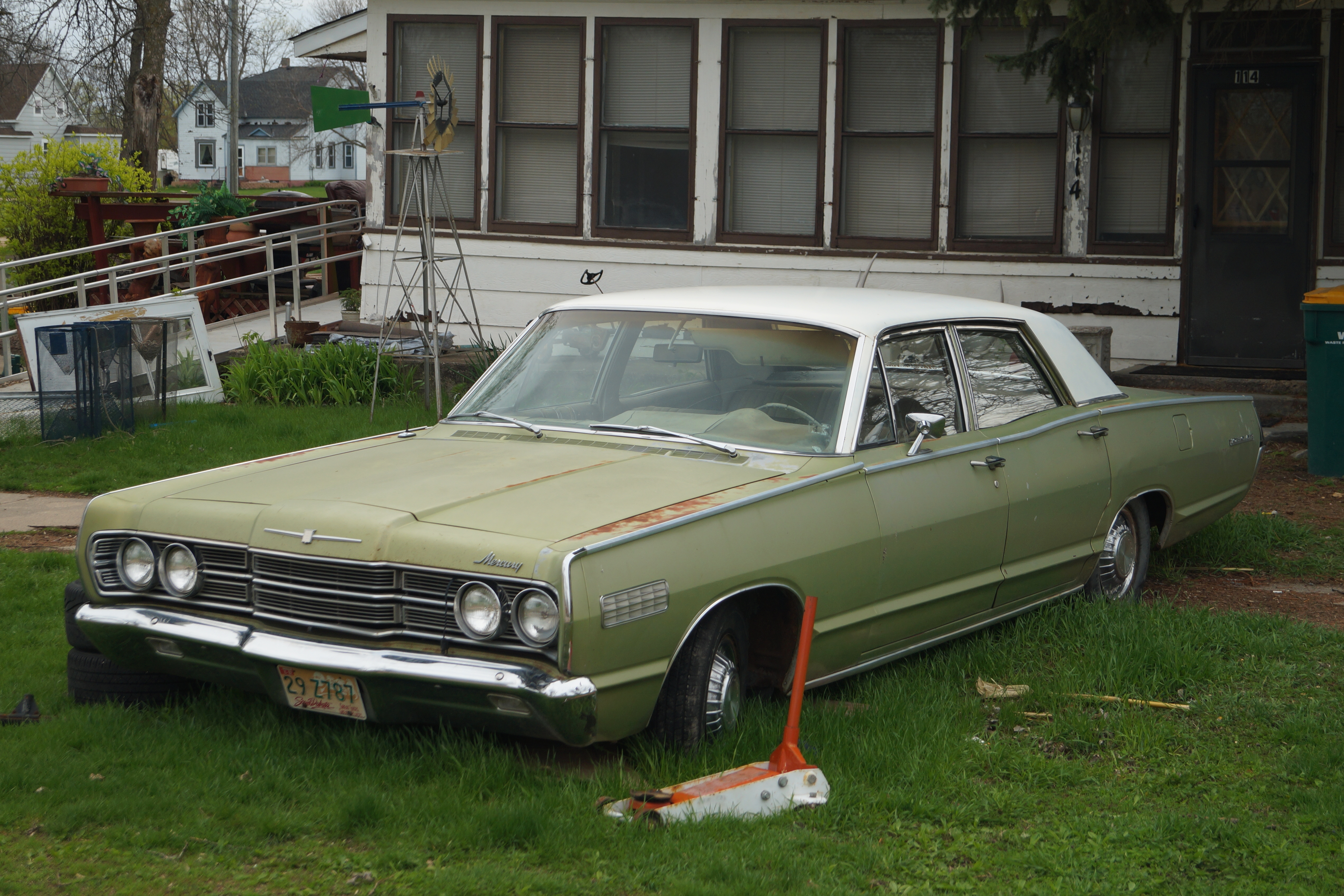
1967 Mercury Montclair 4-door Sedan

For 1965, Mercury introduced a new body and chassis for its full-size sedans, growing to a 123-inch wheelbase; rear leaf springs gave way to coil springs for all four wheels. The only full-size Mercury not sold as a convertible, the Montclair was offered as a four-door sedan and two-door and four-door hardtop. In a marketing change, the Marauder name was dropped from the non-Breezeway roofline; four door hardtops adopted a roofline closer to their two-door counterparts which matched their Ford Galaxie 500 counterparts. The powertrain line was largely carried over from 1964; in a change, the 410 hp 427 V8 was dropped, with the standard 390 V8 becoming available with a manual transmission.

For 1966, the Montclair four-door sedan lost its Breezeway roofline; in a minor restyling, the two-door hardtop received an update to its roofline which was identical to the Ford Galaxie 500. The Montclair received two new optional engines, including a 330 hp 410 cubic-inch V8 (shared with the Park Lane) and a 345 hp 428 cubic-inch V8 (shared with the S-55); all three engines were offered with an automatic transmission.

For 1967 and 1968, Montclair hardtops once again were the same as those on the big Ford; however they were now based on the 1967 luxury LTD series. The Breezeway retractable rear window made its return, redesigned to fit within the standard roofline (now opening only several inches to supplement flow-through ventilation).

For 1968, the Montclair underwent additional revision. Along with revisions to the front and rear fascia to accommodate federally-mandated side market lights, the roofline of the two-door hardtop was again revised, closer in line with the newly introduced Cougar and Marquis.

=== Final discontinuation ===
Following the 1968 model year, Mercury discontinued the Montclair nameplate for the second time. In line with its strategy at the beginning of the 1960s, Mercury consolidated its full-size range onto the Monterey and the newly released Marquis was expanded to a full range of body styles, taking over for the Park Lane/Park Lane Brougham. To fill in for the price range of the Montclair, Mercury introduced the Monterey Custom trim level for 1969, lasting through 1974.
