= Mercury My =

The (my) mercury Concept (sometimes known as the Mercury My) is a concept car that was created by Mercury. The my mercury was first introduced at the 1999 North American International Auto Show. The my mercury was designed by J Mays, the same designer of the Volkswagen New Beetle. This might also explain why the my mercury's curved roofline resembles the New Beetle's. The assembly of the Mercury My concept car was made in Pretoria, South Africa.

== Design ==
The my mercury features suicide-style doors that are center-opening. It also features two amber glass panels. The my mercury also sports a center console that holds a trackball which controls the sound system, climate controls and integrated global positioning system that is displayed on a screen mounted in the center. The entire my mercury looks like neither a car, truck, nor an SUV; it was a foreshadowing of the CUV cross-over segment to follow in the early part of the next decade.
