= Mercury Medalist =

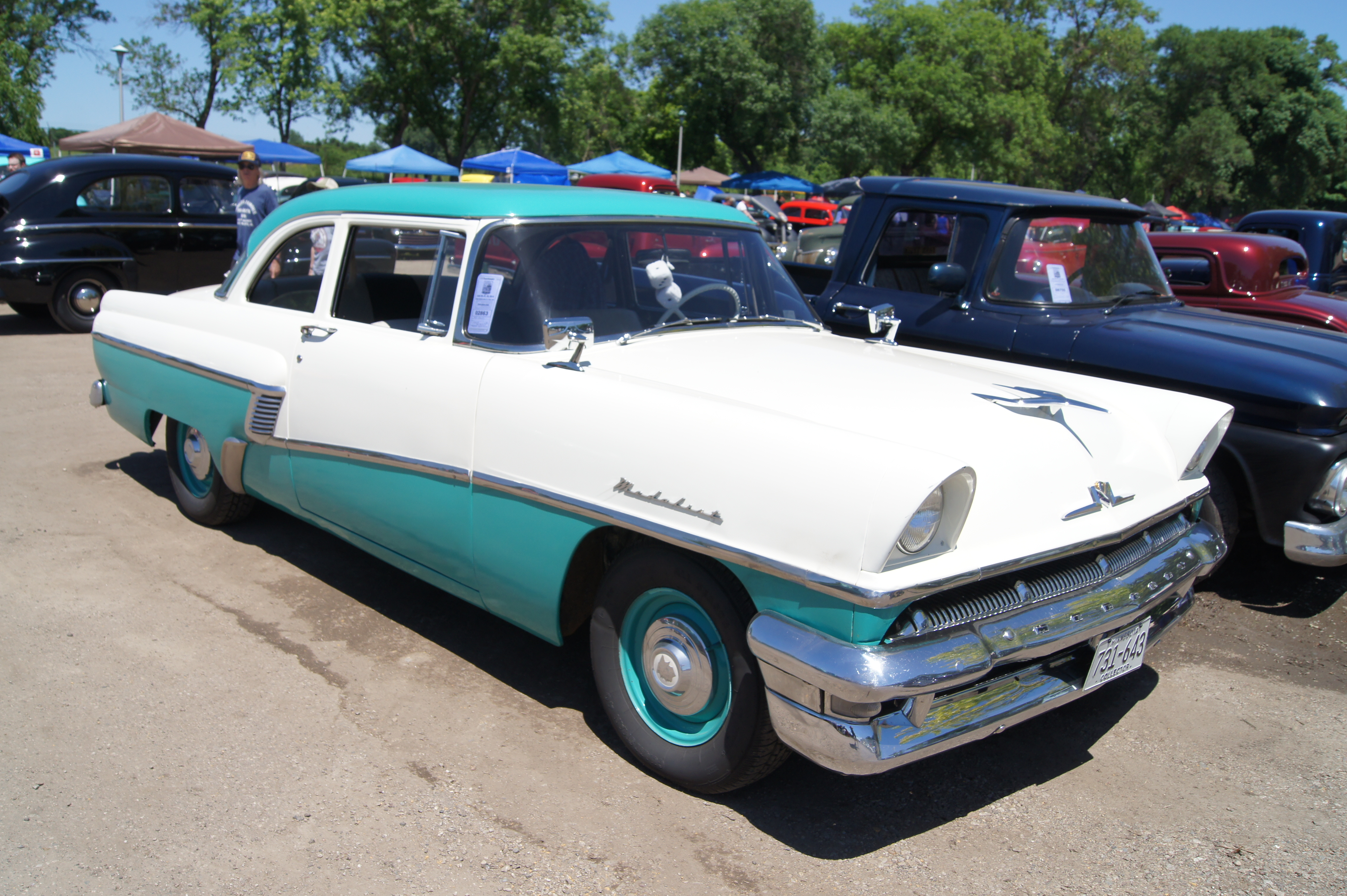
- 1956 Mercury Medalist 2-Door Sedan with optional "Flo-tone" paint combination of Niagara Blue over Classic White

Overview
- Manufacturer: Mercury (Ford)
- Model years: 1956; 1958
- Assembly: Main plant Wayne, Michigan (Branch assembly); St. Louis, Missouri; Pico Rivera, California; Metuchen, New Jersey

Body and chassis
- Class: Full-size
- Body style: 2-door sedan (1956 & 1958); 2-door hardtop Sport Coupe (1956); 4-door sedan (1956 & 1958); 4-door hardtop (1956)
- Layout: FR layout
- Related: Mercury Custom; Mercury Monterey; Mercury Montclair

Powertrain
- Engine: 312 cu in (5.1 L) Ford Y-block V8 (1956 & 1958); 430 cu in (7.0 L) Ford MEL V8 (1958)
- Transmission: 3-speed manual 3-speed Merc-O-Matic automatic Touch-O-Matic overdrive

Dimensions
- Wheelbase: 119 in (3,023 mm) (1956); 122 in (3,099 mm) (1958)
- Length: 206.3 in (5,240 mm) (1956); 213.2 in (5,415 mm) (1958)
- Width: 76.4 in (1,941 mm) (1956); 81.1 in (2,060 mm) (1958)
- Height: 60.6 in (1,539 mm) (1956); 56.1 in (1,425 mm) (1958)
- Curb weight: 3,530 lb (1,601 kg) (1956); 3,875 lb (1,758 kg) (1958)

The Mercury Medalist is an automobile which was produced by Mercury for the 1956 model year and was similar to the Ford Customline in market segment.

The Medalist was introduced as a two-door sedan only in September 1955 as Mercury's low-price model. It was positioned below the Custom, Monterey and Montclair models and replaced the entry-level status the Custom previously held. A four-door sedan, a two door hardtop and a four-door hardtop were added midyear at which time the Medalist was given full series status. It was offered only with a 312 cubic inch V8 engine. The standard items included textured vinyl upholstery, rubber floor mats, and chrome front and rear window surround mouldings, and a rear quarter panel body side stainless steel trim. Optional items included a heater and windshield defroster, "Travel-Tuner" signal seeking AM radio, padded instrument panel, seat belts, power adjustable front seat, power windows, power steering, power brakes, white wall tires mounted on 15 in (381 mm) steel wheels and auxiliary road lamps. Every Mercury for 1955 offered a canted hood over the headlights previously introduced on the Mercury XM-800 concept car from 1954.

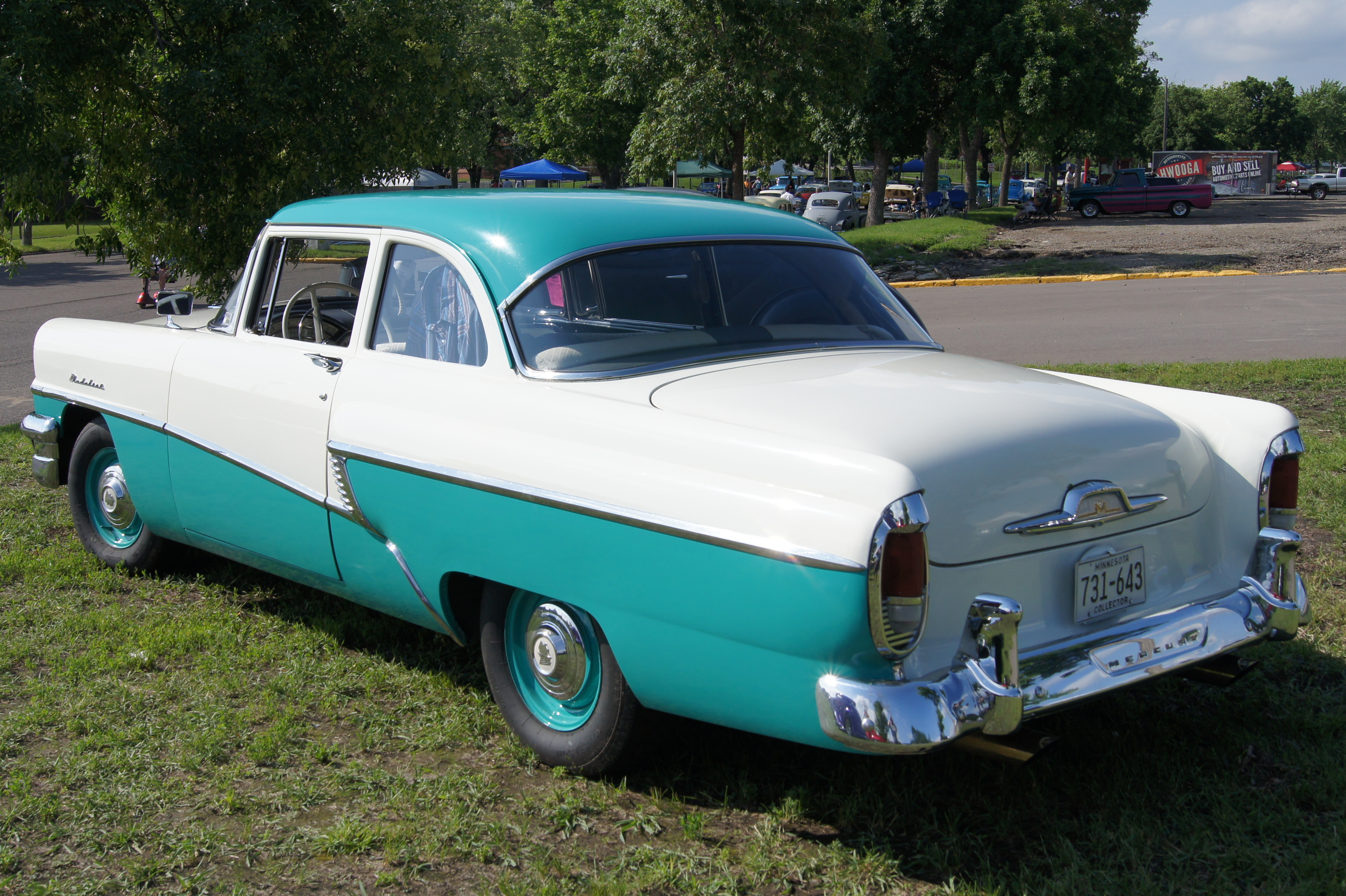
1956 Mercury Medalist 2-door sedan rear

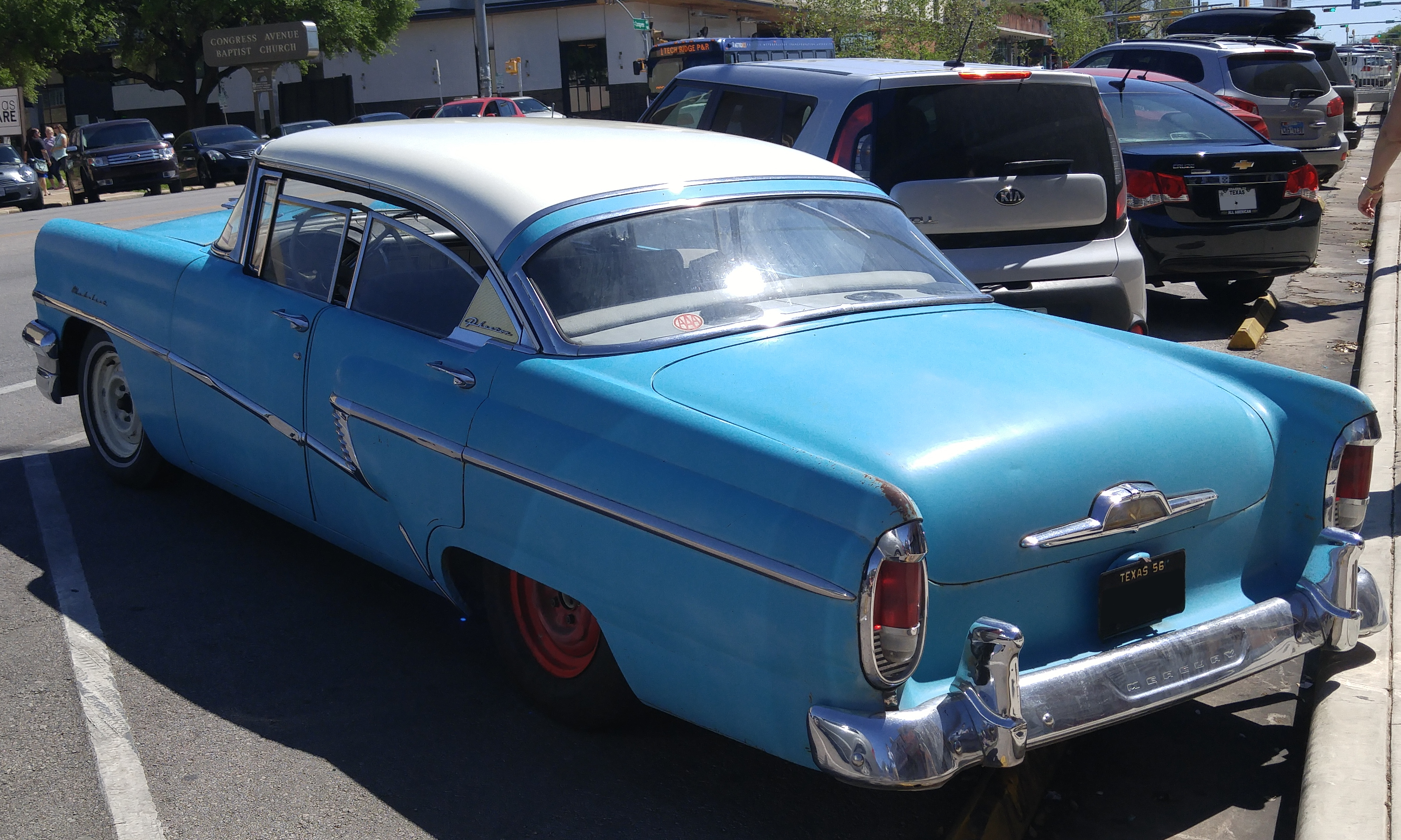
1956 Mercury Medalist Phaeton 4-door sedan rear

For 1956, Mercury introduced two types of two-tone paint combinations, offering the traditional approach of a roof color over a different body color, and "Flo-tone" where the roof and lower body were painted in one color and the upper body painted in another color. There were a total of thirty-one two-tone combinations and twenty-eight "Flo-tone" combinations. The listed retail price was US$2,254 ($26,692 in 2025 dollars) for the 2-Door Sedan and 20,582 were assembled.

The Medalist was discontinued along with the Custom for the 1957 model year with the Monterey now the base model in that year's Mercury range.

The Medalist returned in 1958 once again as the entry-level Mercury as either a 2-door or 4-door sedan and no hardtop roofline was offered. Sixteen standard colors were offered, along with cloth and vinyl upholstery, full carpeting, an electric clock, and chrome window surrounding on the front and rear windows. Two engine choices and a choice of either a 3-speed manual or Merc-O-Matic automatic transmission with available Touch-O-Matic overdrive were available as extra cost options. Other optional equipment listed heater and defroster, air conditioning, AM-radio, tinted glass, 4-way power adjustable front seat, power windows, power steering, power brakes, and a padded instrument panel. Production records show a total of 18,732 2-door and 4-door sedans were manufactured with an average listed price of US$2,582 ($28,813 in 2025 dollars), and was the last year the Medalist nameplate was used.
