= Mercury Custom =

Full-size automobile produced by Mercury (1952-1956)

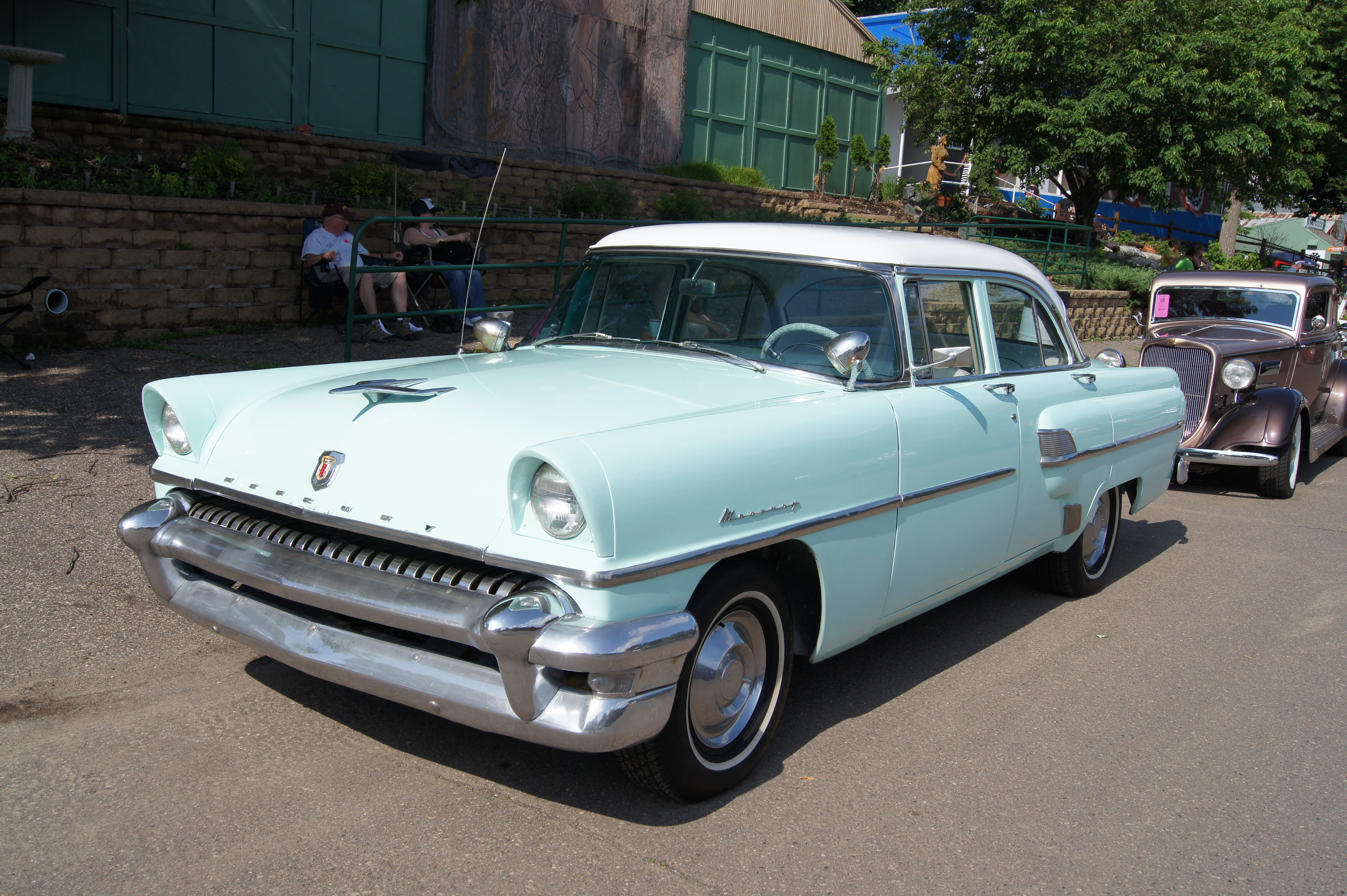
- 1955 Mercury Custom 4-door sedan

Overview
- Manufacturer: Mercury (Ford)
- Model years: 1952–1956
- Assembly: Main plant Wayne, Michigan (Branch assembly); St. Louis, Missouri; Maywood, California; Metuchen, New Jersey

Body and chassis
- Class: Full-size
- Body style: 2-door sedan 4-door sedan 2-door coupe 2-door hardtop 4-door hardtop 4-door station wagon
- Layout: FR layout
- Related: Lincoln Cosmopolitian; Lincoln Capri; Mercury Monterey; Ford Crestline Skyliner

Powertrain
- Engine: 255 cu in (4.2 L) Flathead V8; 256 cu in (4.2 L) Ford Y-block V8; 292 cu in (4.8 L) Ford Y-block V8; 312 cu in (5.1 L) Ford Y-block V8
- Transmission: 3-speed manual 3-speed Merc-O-Matic automatic

Dimensions
- Wheelbase: 118.0 in (2,997 mm) (1952-54 all, 1955-56 wagons); 119.0 in (3,023 mm) (1955-56 exc wagons)
- Length: 202.2 in (5,136 mm)
- Width: 73.5 in (1,867 mm)

Chronology
- Predecessor: Mercury Eight
- Successor: Mercury Medalist

The Mercury Custom is an automobile which was produced by Mercury for the 1952 through 1956 model years.

The Custom was introduced as the base model series in the 1952 Mercury range, replacing the original Mercury Eight that introduced the all-new Mercury marque. It was positioned below the upper trim package Monterey which was also introduced in 1952. The Mercury Medalist displaced the Custom as the base model for 1956, with both series discontinued for 1957 as Mercury was being repositioned as a luxury line above Edsel for 1958.

For the first year, 83,475 4-door sedans were manufactured with a listed price of US$2,040 ($24,733 in 2025 dollars), followed by 25,812 2-door sedans for US$1,987 ($24,091 in 2025 dollars). Color choices were extensive, listing 10 single selections and 17 two-tone choices, and the standard list of equipment included broadcloth upholstery, rubber floor mats, and electric clock, luggage compartment light and chrome window surroundings. Optional equipment included a heater and windshield defroster, radio with antenna, and fog lamps. For 1953, the color choices expanded considerably to offer fifteen single choices and thirty nine two-tone selections.

For 1954, production totals recorded that the Custom was losing ground to the more upscale Monterey, while being moderately more expensive, with continued lack of popularity of the Custom for 1955, as the introduction of the Montclair continued to encourage sales away from the Custom. The introduction of the Mercury Medalist in 1956, which was more modestly priced to the Custom further eroded sales of the Custom which was the last year.

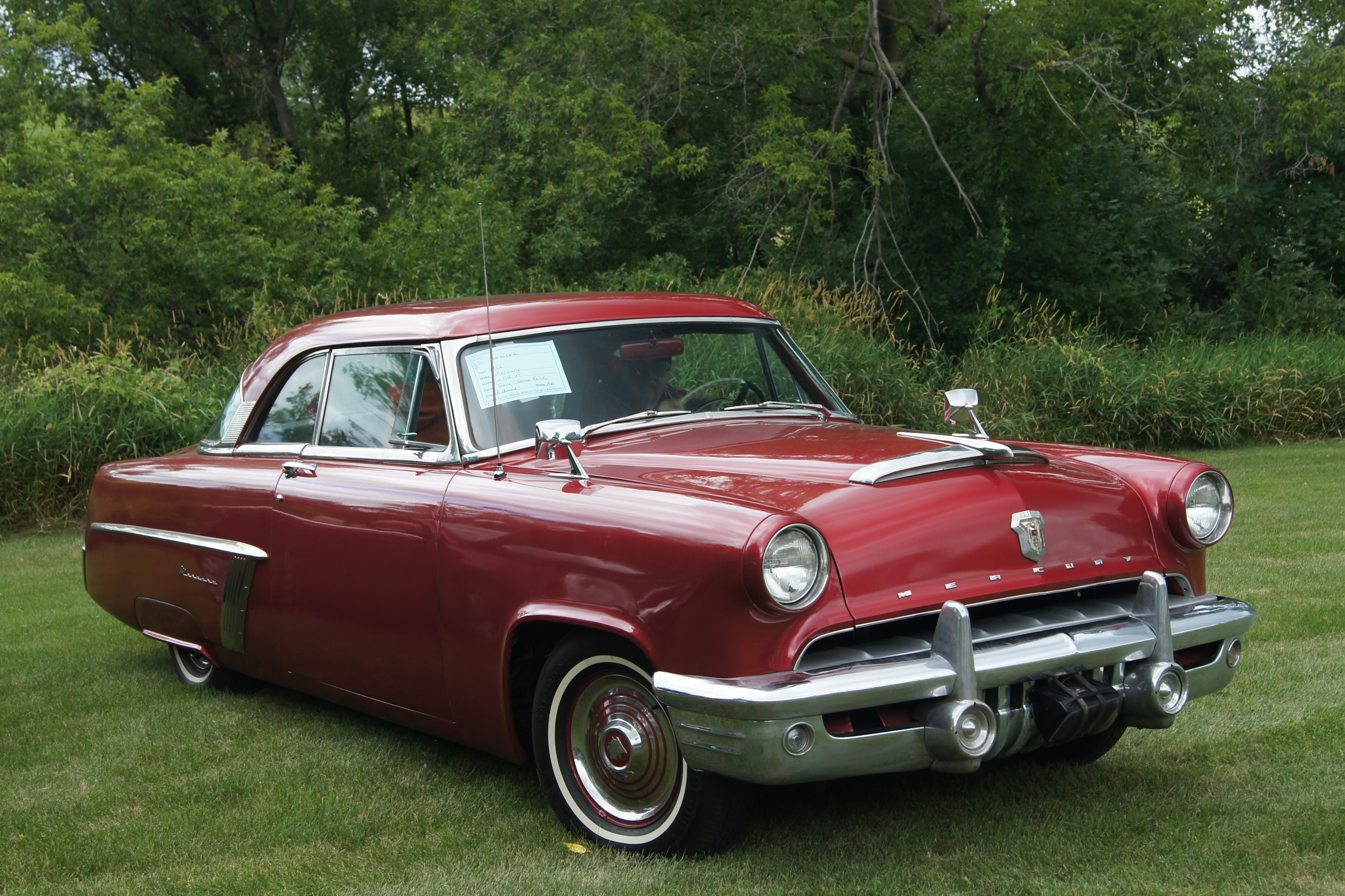
1952 Mercury Custom Sport Coupe

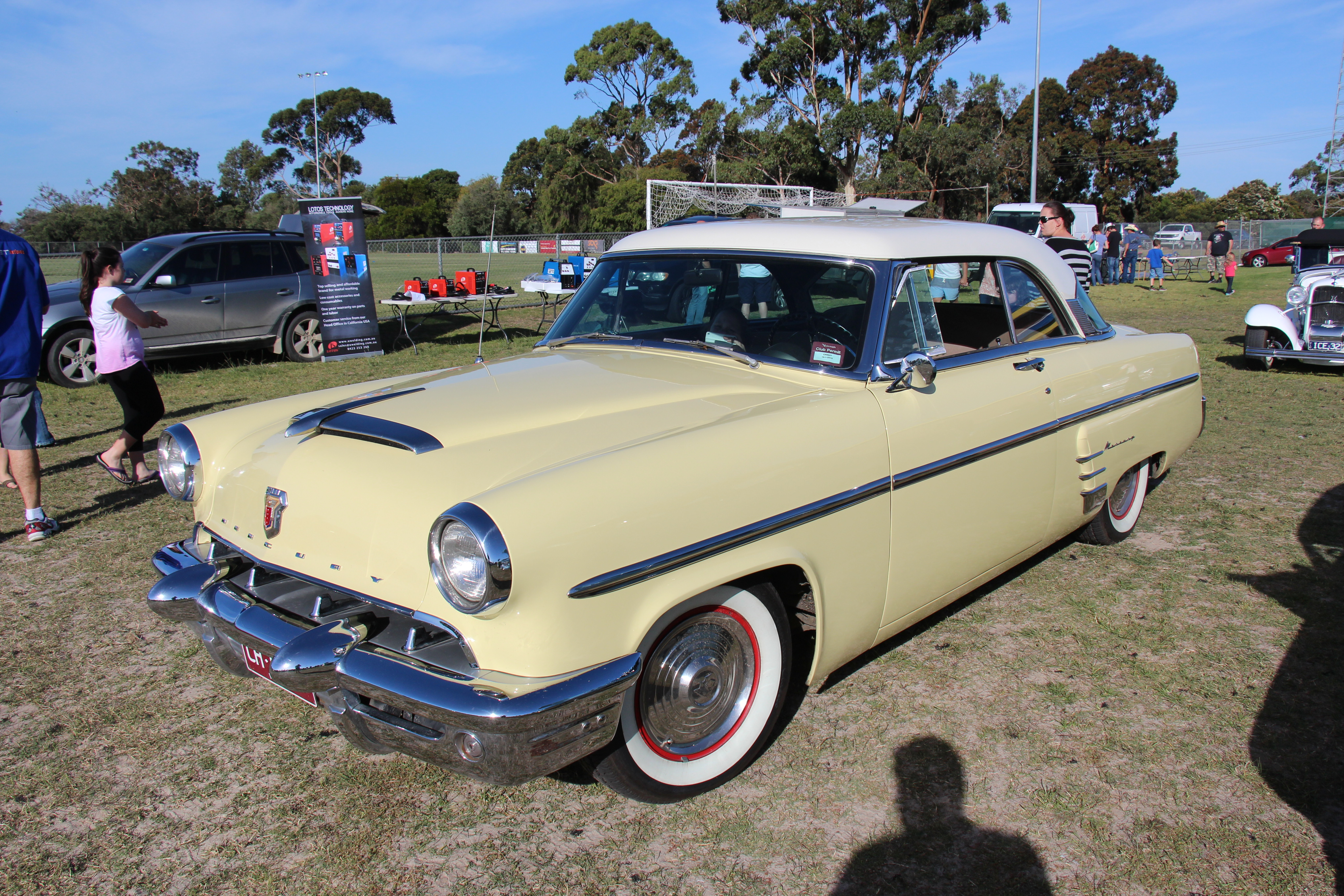
1953 Mercury Custom Sport Coupe

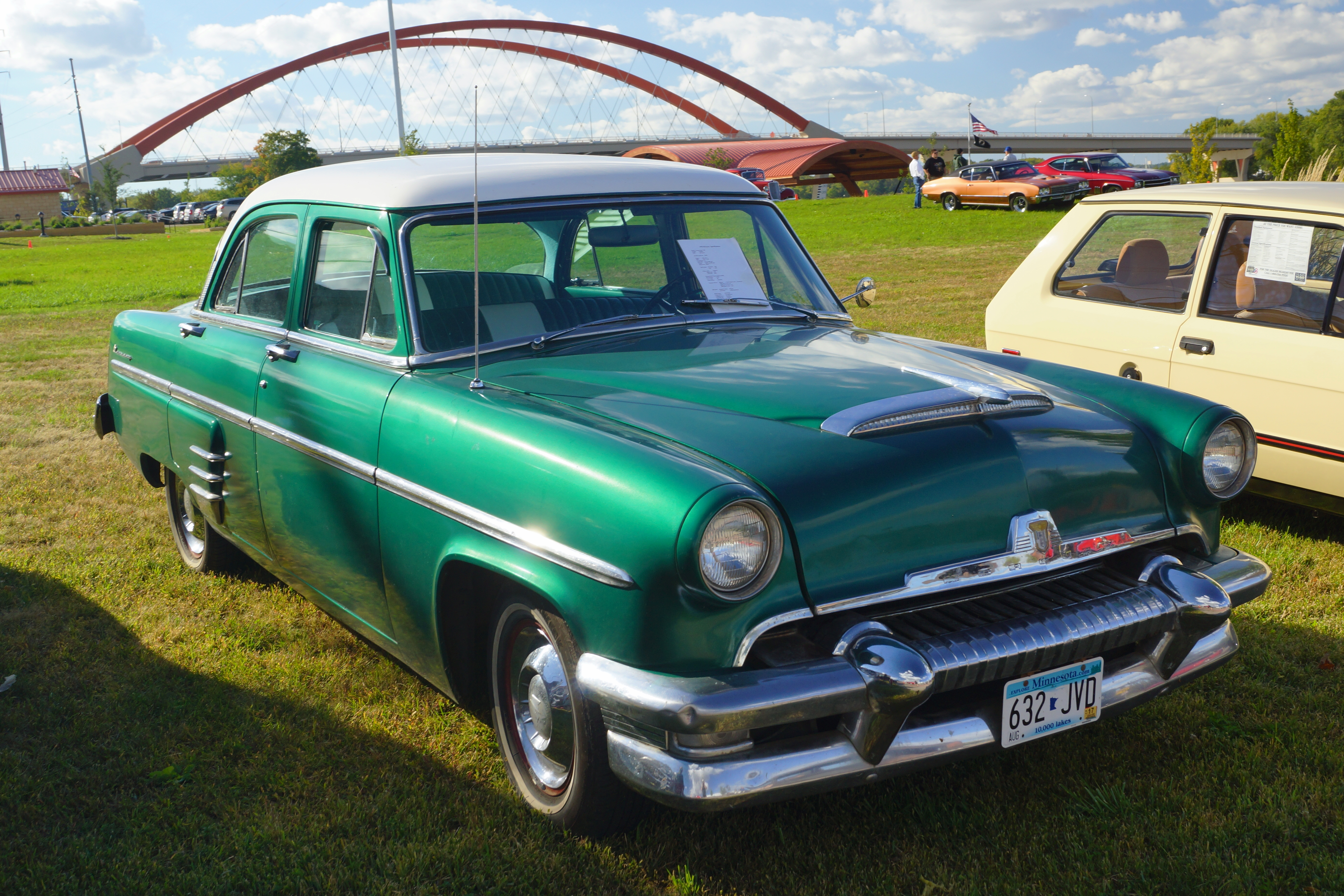
1954 Mercury Custom 4-Door Sedan

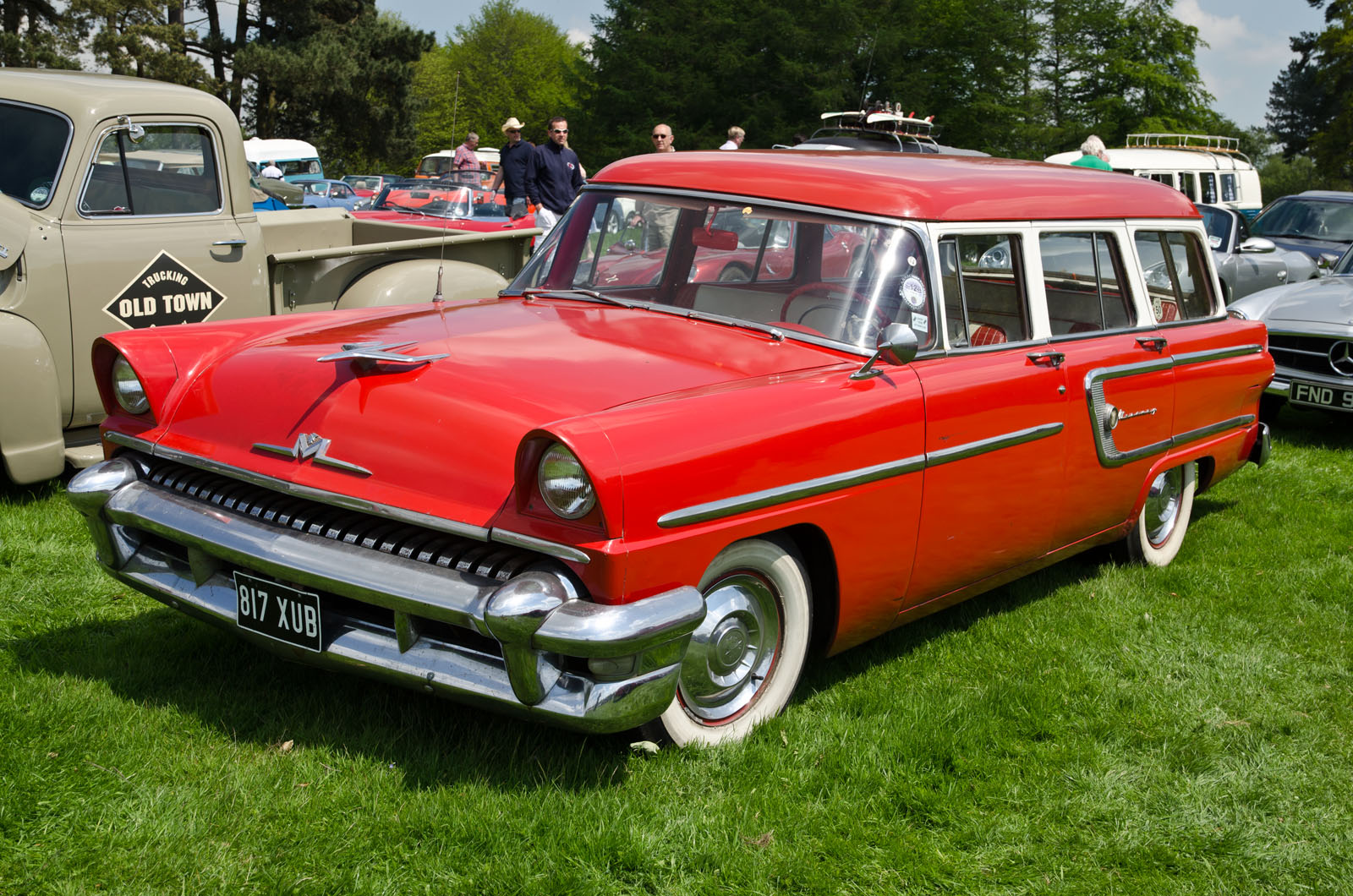
1955 Mercury Custom Station Wagon

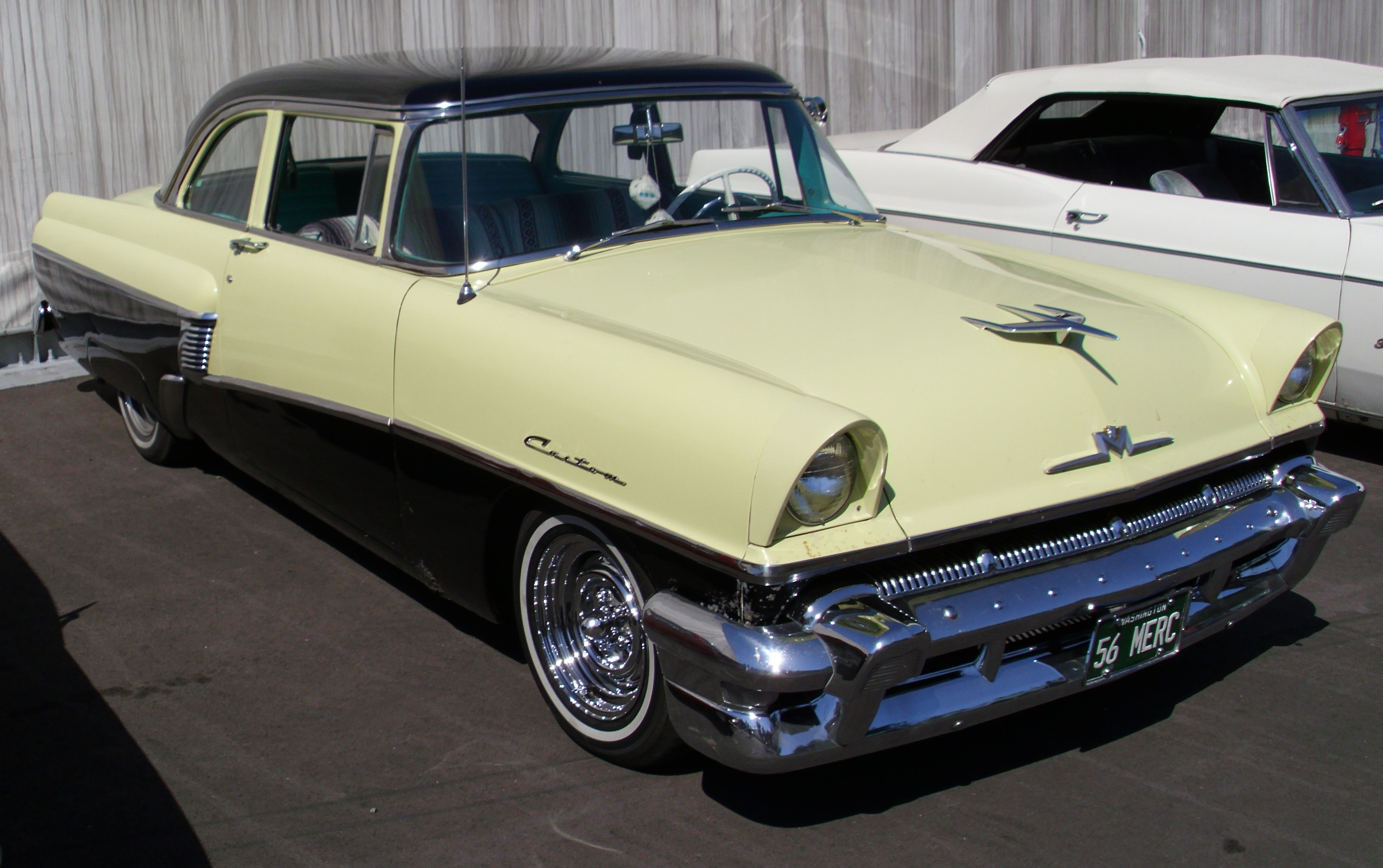
1956 Mercury Custom 2-Door Sedan
