= Ford Galaxie =

American full-size car

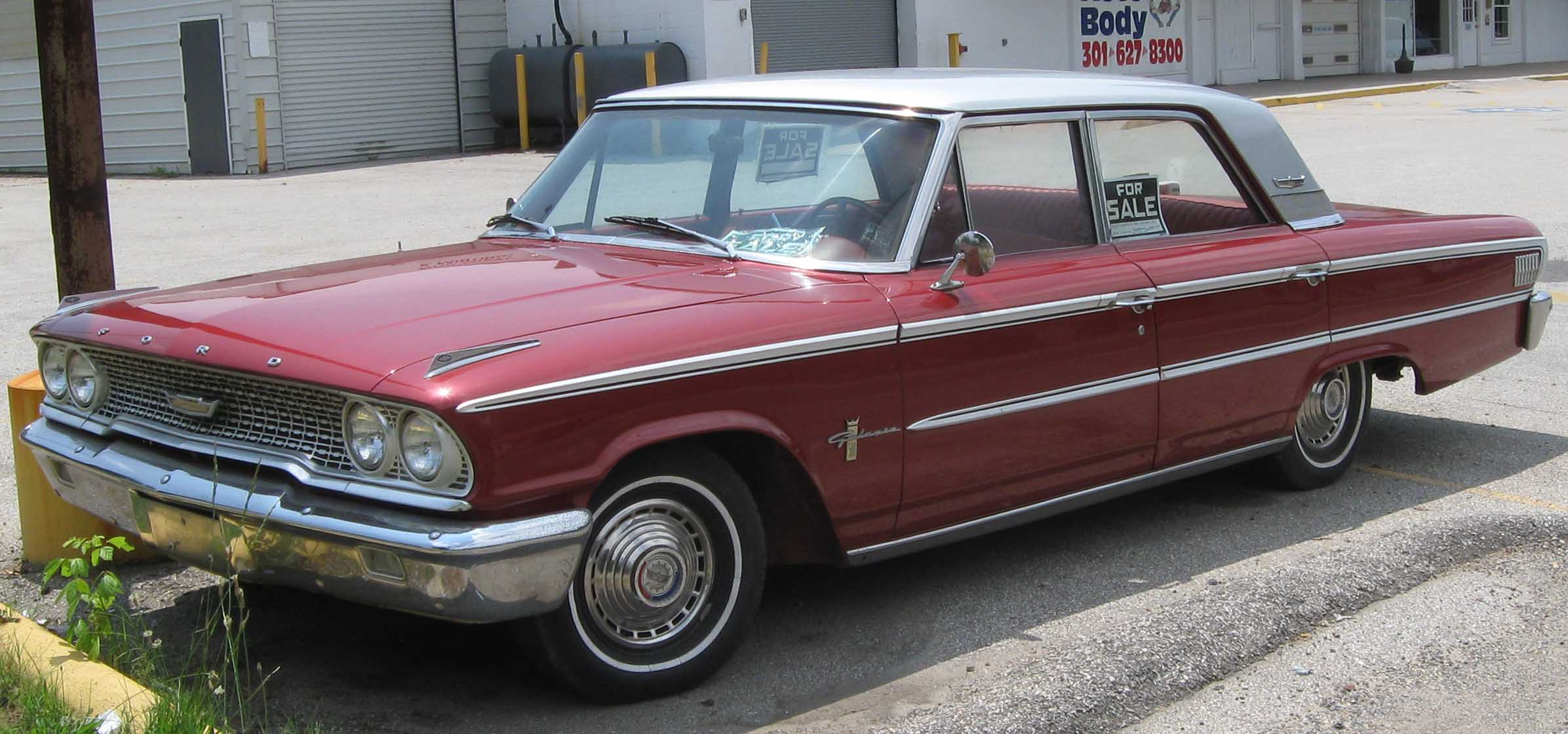
- 1963 Ford Galaxie 500 4-Door Sedan

Overview
- Manufacturer: Ford
- Production: 1958–1974 (United States); 1964–1968 (Australia); 1967–1983 (Brazil)
- Model years: 1959–1974
- Assembly: Atlanta, United States; Louisville, United States; St. Paul, United States; St. Louis, United States; Norfolk, United States; Chicago, United States; Mahwah, United States; Pico Rivera United States; Wayne, United States; Homebush, Australia; São Paulo, Brazil

Body and chassis
- Class: Full-size
- Layout: FR layout

Chronology
- Predecessor: Ford Fairlane
- Successor: Ford LTD

The Ford Galaxie is a full-size automobile that was sold by the Ford Motor Company in North America from the 1959 to 1974 model years. Deriving its nameplate from a marketing tie-in with the excitement surrounding the Space Race, the Galaxie was offered as a sedan within the full-size Ford range throughout its production run. In the full-size segment, the model line competed against the Chevrolet Impala and Plymouth Fury.

The model line was assembled by Ford in multiple sites across the United States; four generations of the model line were produced. The Galaxie was also produced locally by Ford Australia and Ford Brasil, adopting commonality from the third-generation 1965 design.

== Nameplate usage ==
In 1958, a concept car was introduced called "la Galaxie" which incorporated the headlights into pods inline with the grille and a reduced front profile.

For 1962, all full-size Fords wore the Galaxie badge (replacing the Fairlane entirely), as higher-trim series took on Galaxie 500 and Galaxie 500XL badging. For 1965, the higher-content Galaxie 500 LTD was introduced as a flagship model. For 1966, the nomenclature was revised slightly. Alongside the introduction of the higher-performance Galaxie 500 7-Litre, the Galaxie 500 LTD became the Ford LTD, with the Galaxie now becoming the mid-level full-size series (above the Ford Custom/Custom 500). For 1967, the 500 7-Litre was phased into the Ford XL; along with the LTD, the Ford XL was slotted above the standard Galaxie/Galaxie 500.

The Galaxie remained slotted as the mid-range full-size Ford into the 1970s between the Custom and the LTD (the XL was discontinued after 1970). After the 1974 model year, Ford dropped both the Galaxie and the Custom in favor of consolidating its full-size sedan line to the LTD (the Custom 500 remained in production for fleet sales).

== 1959 ==
First generation
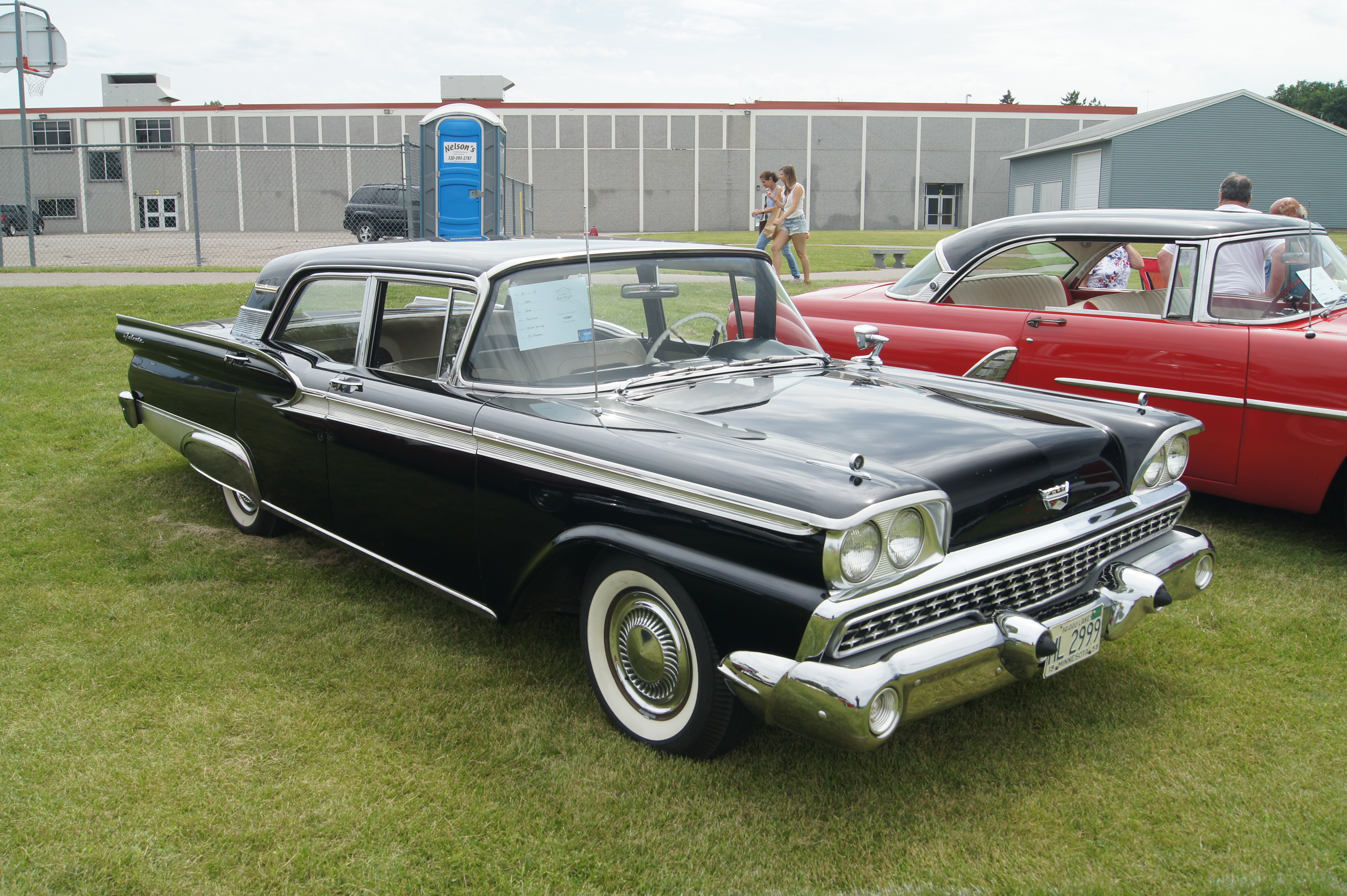
- 1959 Ford Fairlane 500 Galaxie sedan

Overview
- Production: 1958–1959
- Model years: 1959

Body and chassis
- Body style: 2-door sedan (saloon); 4-door sedan; 2-door hardtop; 4-door hardtop; 2-door convertible; 2-door retractable hardtop

Powertrain
- Engine: 223 cu in (3.65 L) OHV I6; 272 cu in (4.5 L) Y-block V8; 292 cu in (4.8 L) Y-block; 312 cu in (5.1 L) Y-block; 332 cu in (5.4 L) FE series V8; 352 cu in (5.8 L) FE series
- Transmission: 2-speed Cruise-O-Matic automatic; 3-speed automatic; 3-speed manual

Dimensions
- Wheelbase: 2,997 mm (118.0 in)
- Length: 208 in (5,283 mm)
- Width: 76.8 in (1,951 mm)

The 1959 Ford range was introduced in late 1958 with the Fairlane 500 as the top trim level. During the 1959 model year, the Galaxie was added to the range as an additional trim level, assuming the top position from the Fairlane 500. The Galaxie was offered with the same sedan and hardtop body styles as the Fairlane 500 whilst the Sunliner and Skyliner convertibles were moved across from the Fairlane 500 range. Styling varied from the Fairlane 500 with the addition of a Ford Thunderbird-style C pillar on all but the Sunliner. Although a separate series from the Fairlane 500, 1959 Galaxie models carried both Fairlane 500 and Galaxie badging.

In keeping with the era, the 1959 Galaxie was a chrome and stainless steel-bedecked vehicle with optional two-tone paint. It was the very image of the ostentatious late-1950s American automobiles, though somewhat tamer than its Chevrolet and Plymouth competitors. Ford advertised "safety anchorage" for the front seats. The parking brake was now a pedal. Seat belts, a padded dashboard, and child-proof rear door locks were optional, while a deep-dished steering wheel and double-door locks were standard.

Among the models was the Skyliner, moved up-market from the Fairlane 500 and featuring a retractable hardtop that folded down into the trunk space. This feature was complicated and expensive, and left very little trunk room when folded down. Power retractable hardtops have since been used by luxury manufacturers such as Mercedes-Benz, Lexus, and Cadillac, but none of these had rear seats, necessitating a much smaller top mechanism than the Skyliner's. It was not until 2000, when the Peugeot 206cc arrived, that a retractable hardtop with a rear seat arrived. This was joined by the Peugeot 307cc in 2003, and later also by the Pontiac G6 convertible and Volkswagen Eos.

A fixture also was the previous year's 352 V8, still developing 300 hp (220 kW; 300 PS).

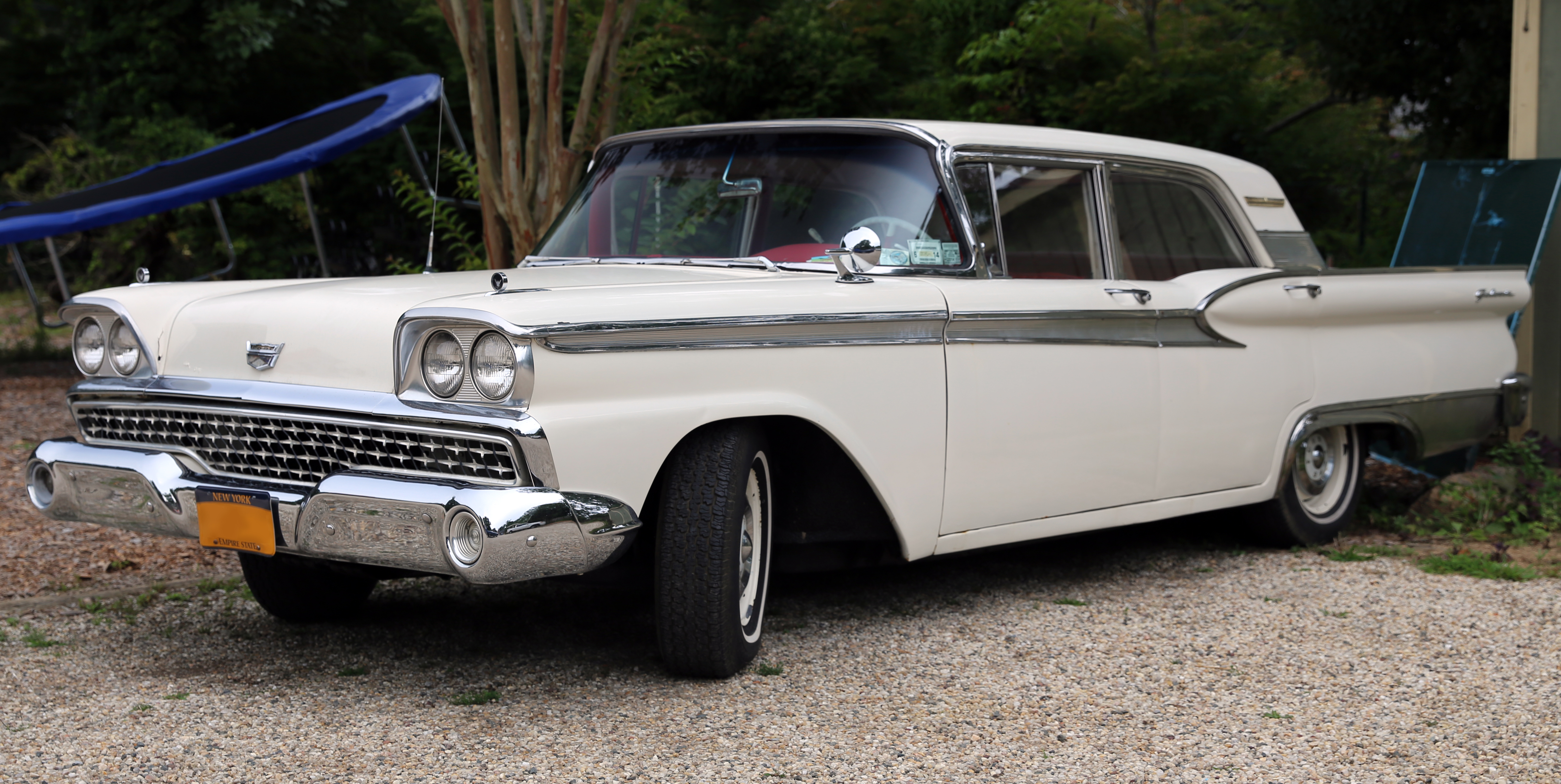
1959 Ford Galaxie Town sedan. 1959 Galaxies carried both Fairlane 500 and Galaxie badges

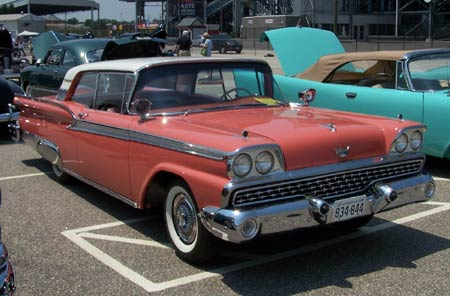
1959 Ford Galaxie Club Victoria

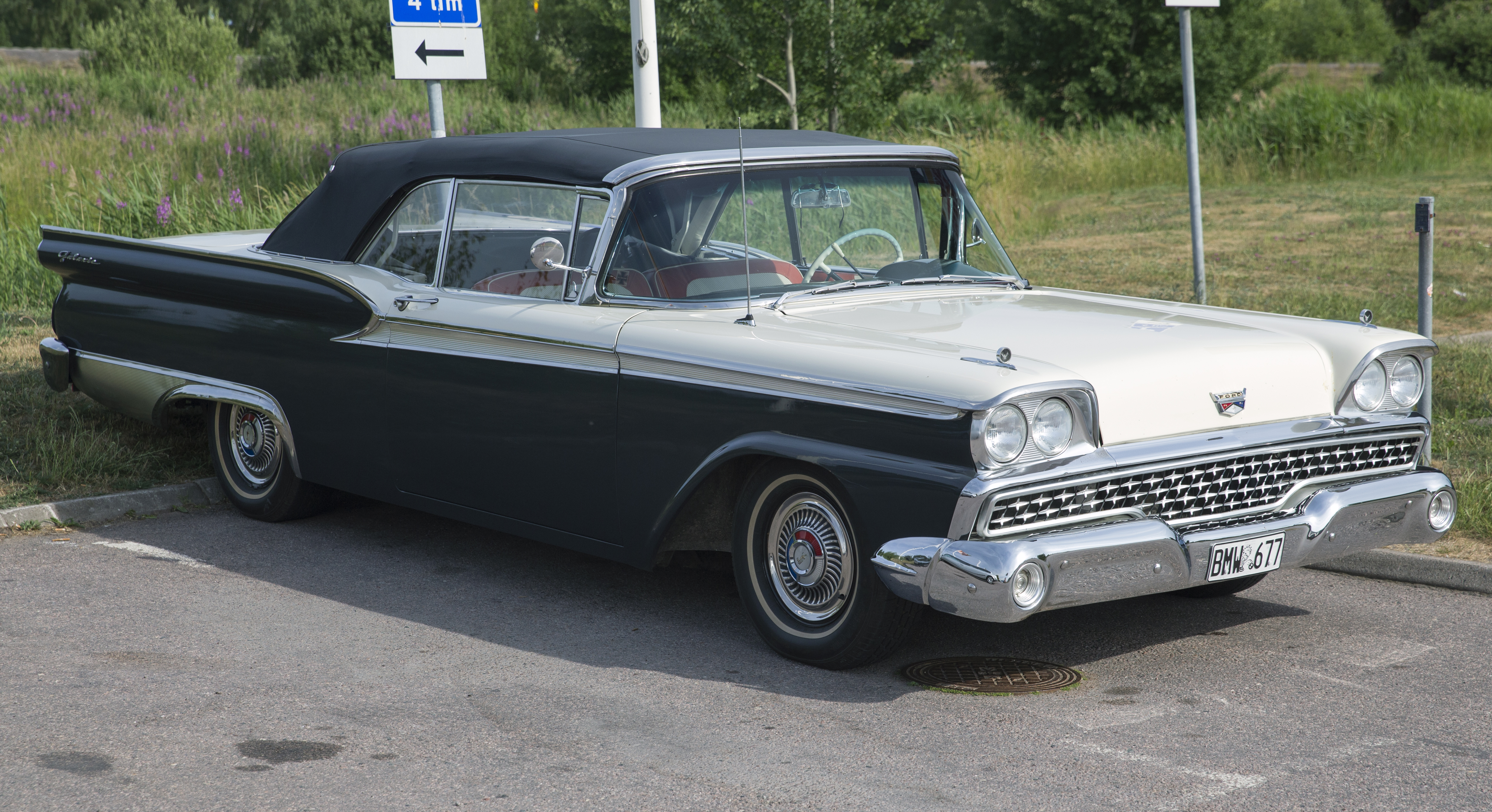
1959 Ford Galaxie Sunliner

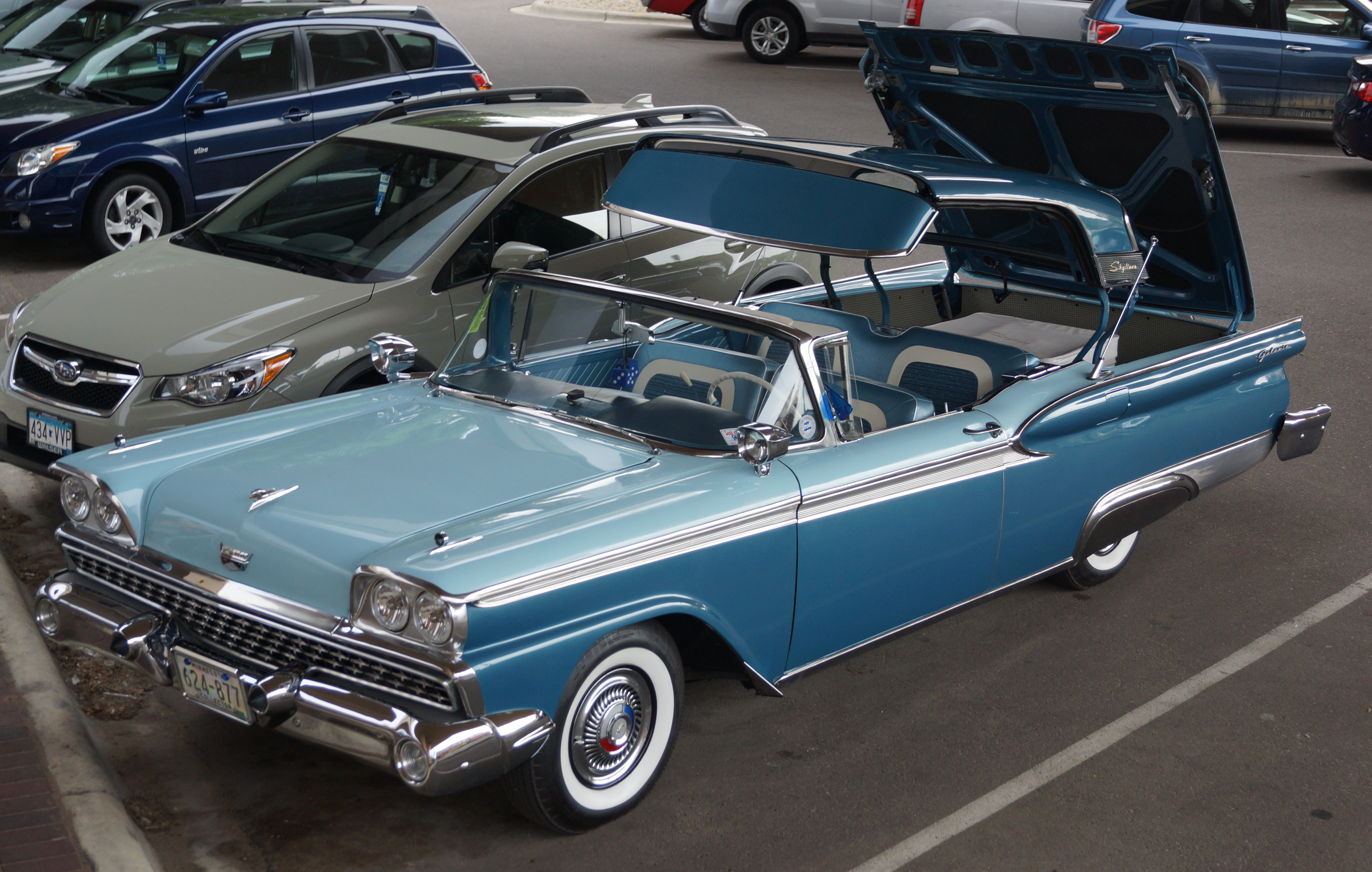
1959 Ford Galaxie Skyliner, showing the roof retraction.

== 1960–1964 ==
Second generation
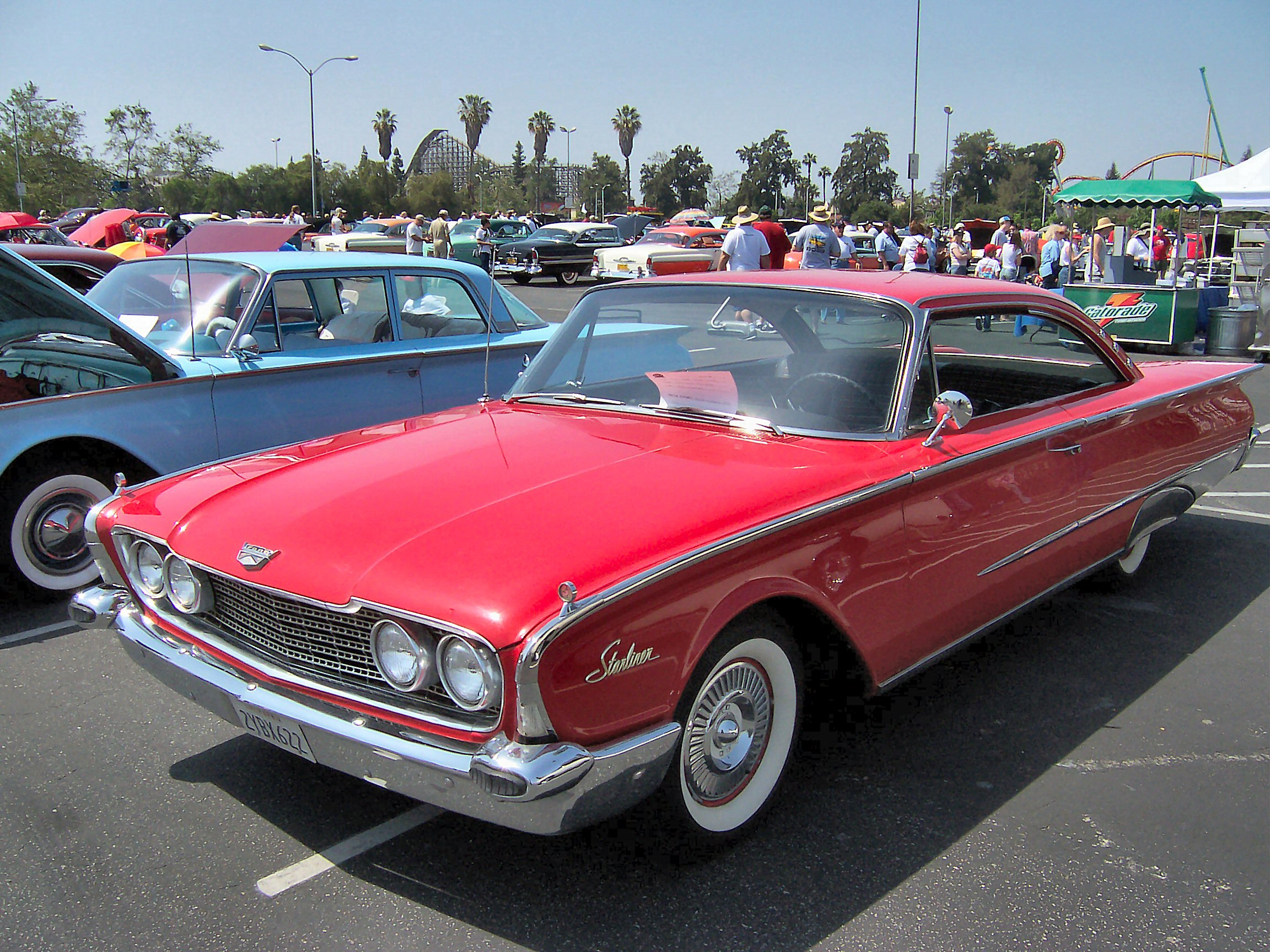
- 1960 Starliner

Overview
- Production: 1959–1964
- Model years: 1960–1964

Body and chassis
- Body style: 2/4-door sedan; 2/4-door hardtop; 2-door convertible
- Related: Ford Fairlane (1960–1961); Ford 300 (1963); Ford Custom (1964); Ford Ranch Wagon (1960–1962); Ford Country Sedan; Ford Country Squire; Ford Courier (1960); Edsel Ranger (1960); Edsel Villager (1960); Mercury Meteor (1961); Mercury Monterey (1961–1964); Mercury Montclair (1964); Mercury Park Lane (1964); Mercury Commuter (1964); Mercury Colony Park (1961–1964); Mercury S-55 (1962–1963); Mercury Marauder (1963–1964)

Powertrain
- Engine: 223 cu in (3.7 L) Mileage Maker I6; 260 cu in (4.3 L) Windsor V8; 289 cu in (4.7 L) Windsor V8; 292 cu in (4.8 L) Y-block V8; 352 cu in (5.8 L) FE series V8; 390 cu in (6.4 L) FE series V8; 406 cu in (6.7 L) FE series V8; 427 cu in (7.0 L) FE series V8
- Transmission: 2-speed Ford-O-Matic automatic; 3-speed Cruise-O-Matic automatic; 3-Speed Manual; 3-Speed Manual and overdrive; 4-Speed Manual

Dimensions
- Wheelbase: 119.0 in (3,023 mm)
- Length: 213.7 in (5,428.0 mm) (1960); 209.9 in (5,331.5 mm) (1961–1964)
- Width: 81.5 in (2,070 mm)

1960

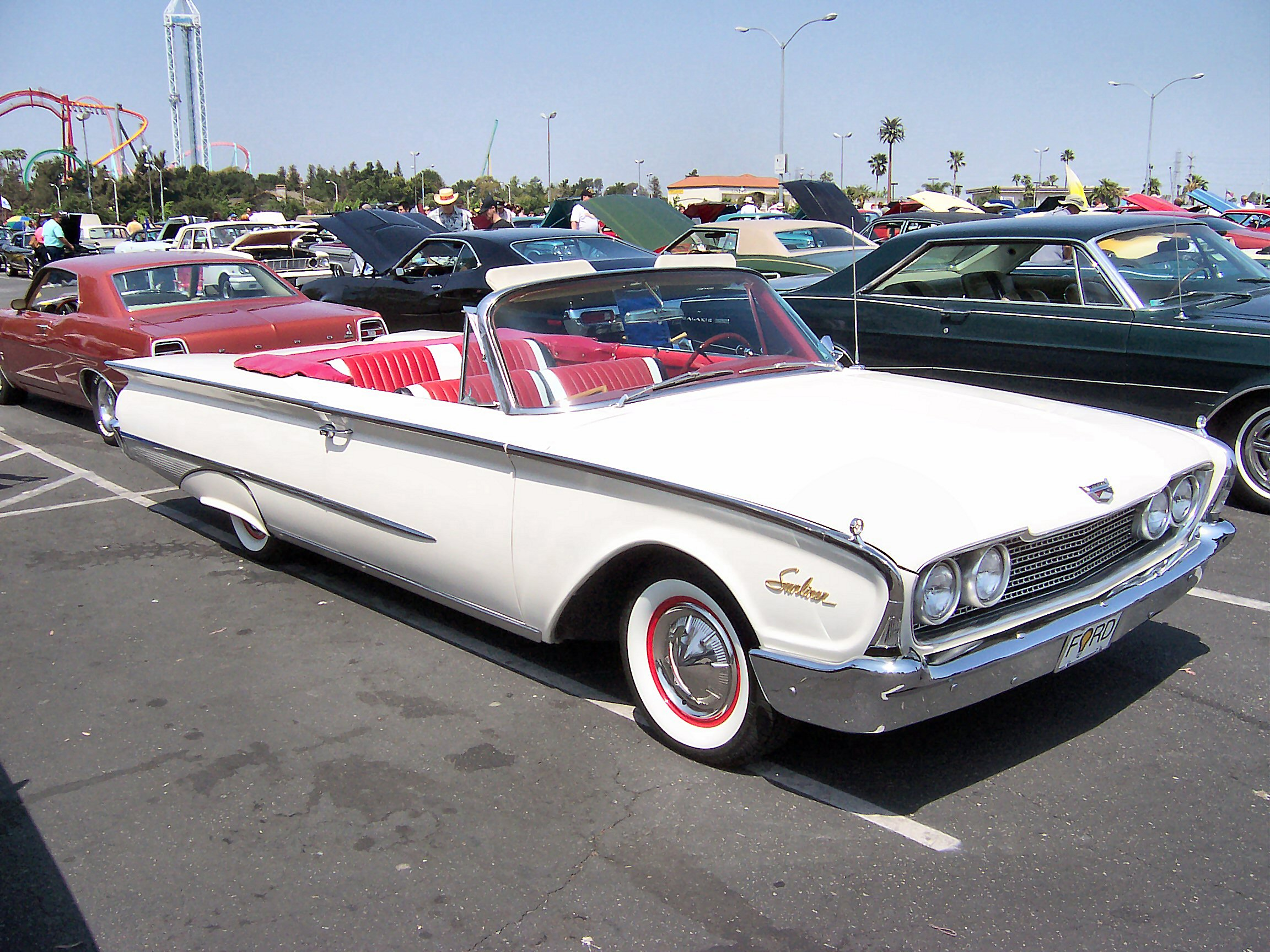
1960 Ford Galaxie Sunliner

The 1960 Galaxie introduced all-new design with less ornamentation. A new body style was the Starliner, featuring a huge, curving rear observation window on a pillarless, hardtop bodyshell. The thin, sloping rear roof pillar featured three "star" emblems that served as the Galaxie signature badge for all 1960 - 62 models. The formal roofed 2-door hardtop was not available this year, but the roofline was used for the Galaxie 2-door pillared sedan, complete with chromed window frames. It had been the most popular body style in the line for 1959, and sales dropped off sharply. Contrary to Ford's tradition of pie-plate round taillights, the 1960 featured "half-moon" lenses turned downward. The "A" pillar now swept backward instead of forward, making entering and exiting the car more convenient.

1961

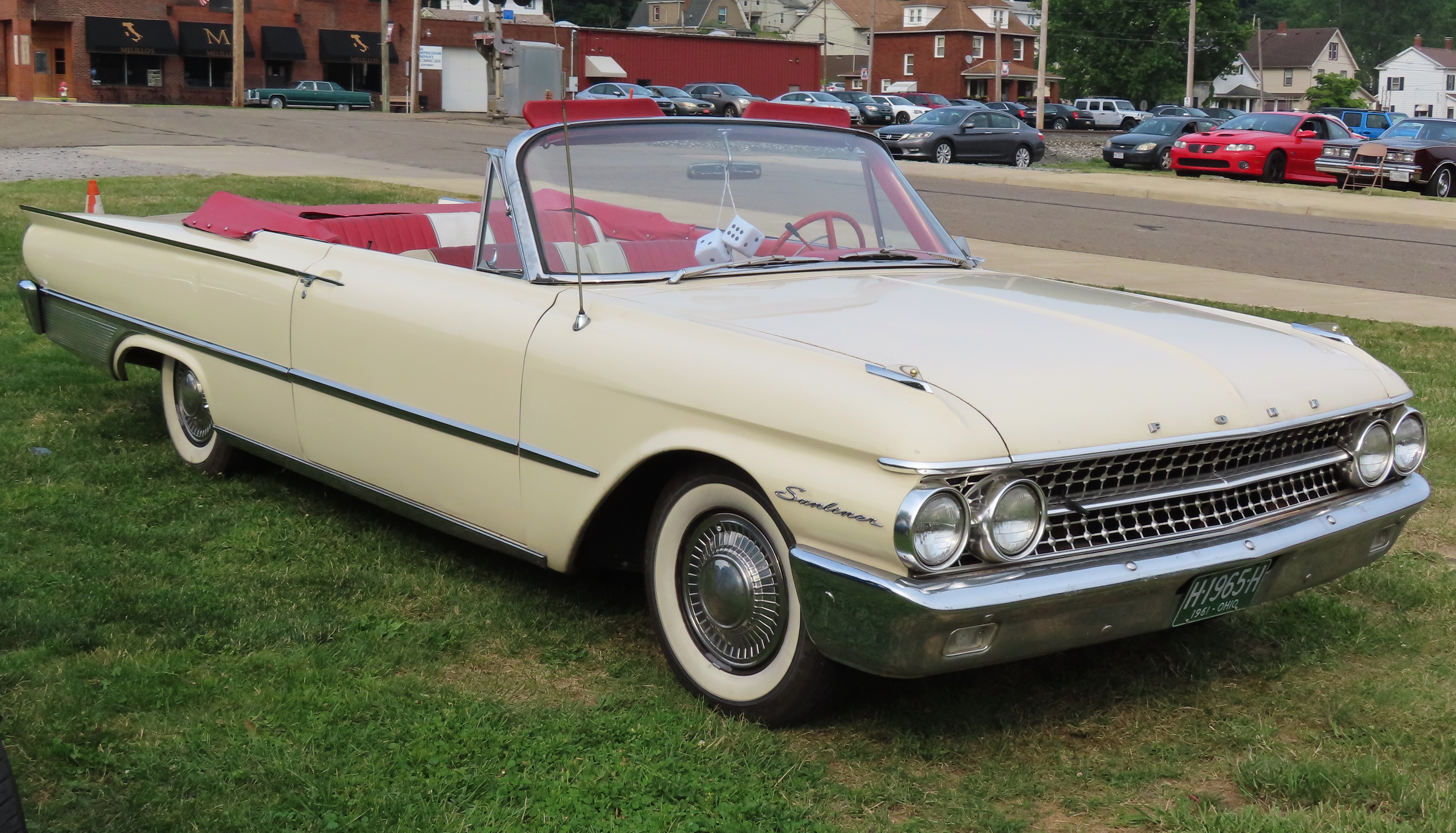
1961 Ford Galaxie Sunliner

For 1961, the bodywork was redone again, although the underpinnings were the same as for 1960. This time, the tailfins were almost gone; the small blade-like fins capped smaller versions of 1959's "pie-plate" round taillamps once again. Performance was beginning to be a selling point, and the 1961 Galaxie offered a new 390-cubic-inch (6.4 L) version of Ford's FE series pushrod V8, which was available with either a four-barrel carburetor or, for higher performance, three two-barrel carburetors. The latter was rated at 401 hp (299 kW) (gross). The 352 was downgraded in favor of the 390; it was equipped with a 2-barrel carburetor and single exhaust. The Starliner was again offered this year, and Ford promoted this model with luxury and power equipment, but it was dropped at the end of the year, as the re-introduced square-roof hardtop coupe, the Galaxie Club Victoria, took the bulk of sales.

1962

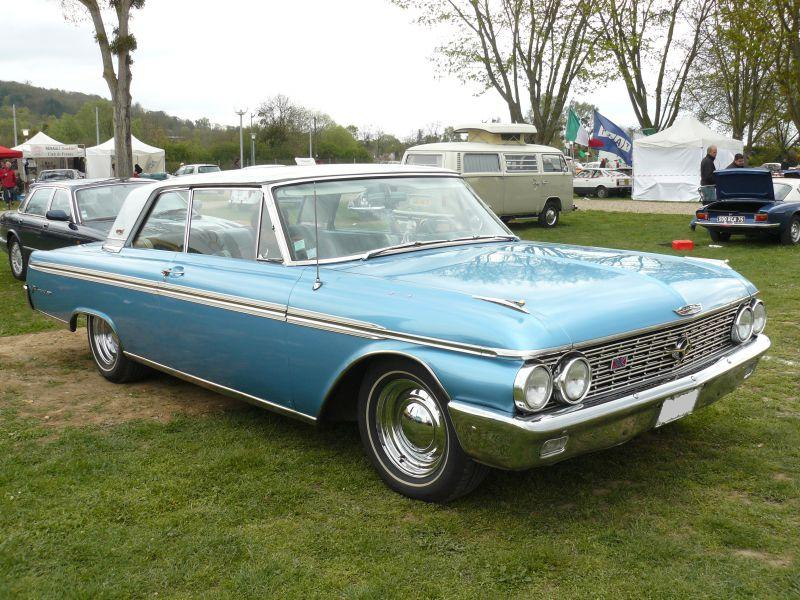
1962 Ford Galaxie 500 Club Victoria

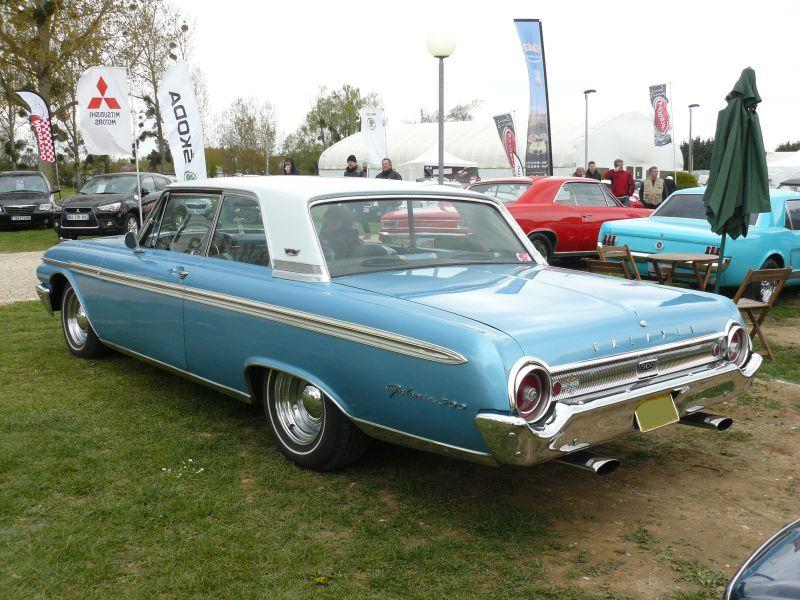
1962 Ford Galaxie 500 Club Victoria

For 1962, the Galaxie name was applied to all of Ford's full size models, as the Fairlane name was moved to a new intermediate model and Custom was temporarily retired. New top-line Galaxie 500 (two-door sedan and hardtop, four-door sedan and hardtop, and "Sunliner" convertible) models offered plusher interiors, more chrome trim outside, and a few additional luxury items over and above what was standard on the plainer Galaxie models. Base Galaxie models were available in two- and four-door sedans as well as the plain Ranch Wagon. In an effort to stimulate midseason sales, Ford introduced a group of sporty cars along with a "Lively Ones" marketing campaign. These models featured the bucket seats and console that were popularized by the Chevrolet Corvair Monza, and included a Fairlane 500 Sports Coupe, and a Falcon Futura. The full-size line was available with new bucket-seats-and-console "Lively One," the Galaxie 500/XL (two-door hardtop and convertible). Ford stated in its sales literature that XL stood for "Xtra Lively."

The 223 cu in (3.7 L) "Mileage Maker" 6-cylinder was the base engine. The 292 cu in (4.8 L) V8 was standard on the 500/XL. The XL had sportier trim inside and out. This model was Ford's response to Chevrolet's Super Sport option for the big Impala, which was introduced the previous year and saw a significant rise in sales for 1962. A 406 cu in (7 L) engine was available in single four-barrel or triple-carbureted "six-barrel" form. Tailfins were gone, giving the 1962 models a more rounded, softer rear end look. Taillights were set lower into the rear panel and were partially sunken into the newly sculpted rear bumper. Outside, XL models got a thicker body side chrome spear, along with a new "Galaxie 500XL" emblem on each rear fender (including the convertible, where this badge replaced the "Sunliner" script). An oval version of the Galaxie "star" emblem replaced Ford crests on the roof sail panels on hardtops. Front fenders shapes were the same as 1961; a slightly modified flat-face grille featured a large "star"emblem in its center for all 500 and higher-priced Galaxie models.

The 1962 models were overweight by comparison to the Super Duty Pontiacs with their aluminum body panels and larger-displacement engines. Therefore, late in the production run, Ford's Experimental Garage was ordered to reduce the weight of the Galaxie. It produced 11 "lightweight Galaxies", making use of fiberglass panels, as well as aluminum bumpers, fender aprons, and brackets; the result was a Galaxie weighing in at under 3,400 lb (1,542 kg). The base 2-door Club Sedan was 3,499 lb (1,587 kg). It was an improvement.

1963

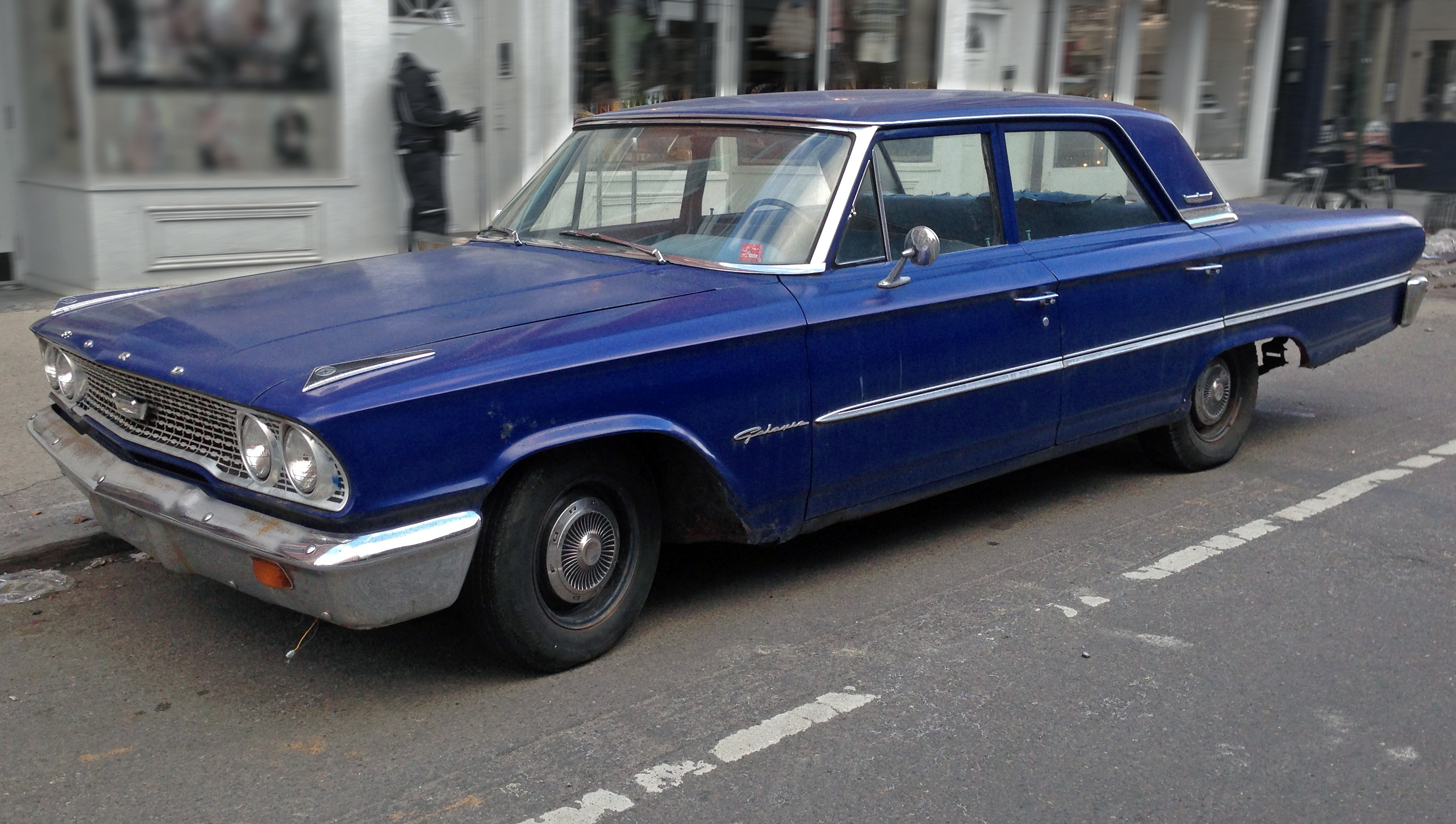
1963 Ford Galaxie 4-door sedan

The 1963 model was essentially unchanged save for some freshening and added trim; windshields were reshaped and a four-door hardtop 500/XL was added. A lower, fastback roofline was added mid-year to improve looks and make the big cars more competitive on the NASCAR tracks with less drag and reduced aerodynamic lift at high speed. This 1963½ model, the industry's first official "½ year" model, was called the "sports hardtop" or "fastback" (it shared this feature with the for 1963½ Falcon). Galaxie buyers showed their preference as the new sports hardtop models handily outsold the "boxtop" square-roof models. The sports hardtop was available in both Galaxie 500, and Galaxie 500/XL trim. Mercury also received the new roofline (under the Marauder badge) in Monterey, Montclair, and Park Lane models. This year, a no-frills big Ford, priced around $100.00 below the base Galaxie sedans, was offered, badged as the Ford 300. It was offered for 1963 only, and was replaced by the Custom series in 1964. The "Swing-away" steering wheel became optional.

The Fairlane's newly enlarged "Challenger" V8 engine of 260 cu in (4.3 L) replaced the Y-block 292 cu in (4.8 L) as the entry level V8. Later in the year, the 260 was replaced with an enlarged version displacing 289 cubic inches. At the beginning of the 1963 model run, the 292 Y-block V8 was replaced as the base V8 engine with the Fairlane's new small block 260. The 260 proved underpowered for the heavy full size Ford and was replaced midyear (coincident with the introduction of the 63 and 1/2 models) with the 289 V8. The 289 was then the largest of the "small block series" that was first used (221 cubic inch version) in the 1962 Fairlane. The 260 was offered on the Falcon Sprint and later, in mid 1964, in the early version of the 1965 Mustang. By 1965 model introduction (in the fall of 1964), the 260 (which had disappointing performance in all versions including the Sprint and Mustang) was replaced by the 289 in all models.

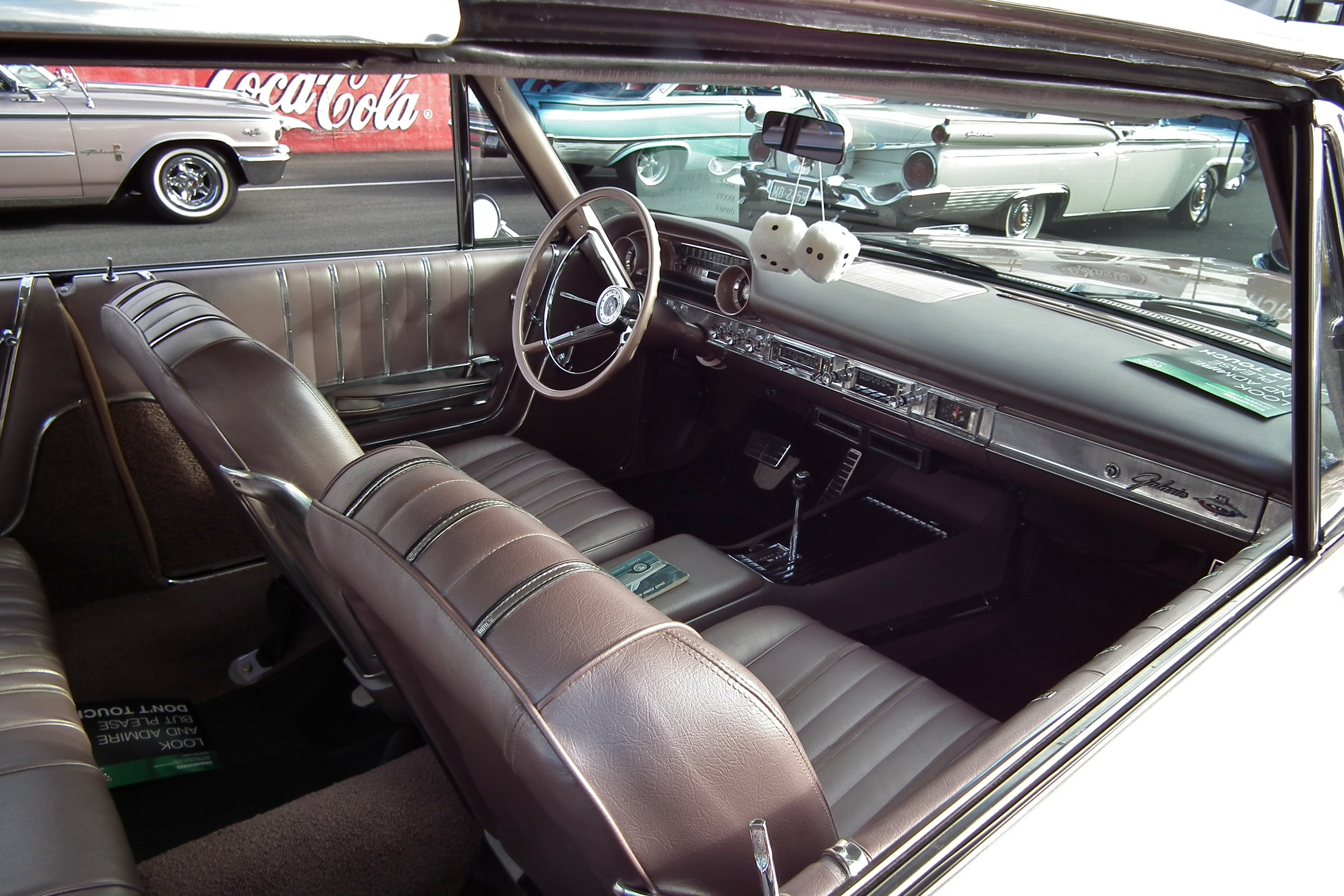
1963 Ford Galaxie 500 XL hardtop interior

Ford continued to offer the FE series 352 in the 1963 full size, as well as 3 versions of the 390 V8 (regular, high performance, and police). Five different transmissions were offered for 1963. A 3-speed manual column shift was standard on all models except the 406 V8, which required the heavier duty Borg-Warner 4-speed manual. A three speed manual with overdrive was optional, but rarely ordered. The two-speed Ford-O-Matic was common with the 6-cylinder and small block V-8s, while the majority of big blocks (352 and 390) were ordered with the 3-speed Cruise-O-Matic automatic transmission. The availability of several different rear end ratios, along with 5 transmissions, and 8 different engines, led to a huge number of different driveline combinations for 1963. The most produced combination for the Galaxie and Galaxie 500 was the 352 V8, with Cruise-O-Matic and the 3.0 rear end ratio. Ford's "Club," "Town," and "Victoria" monikers for body styles were retired in 1963, replaced by generic labels, "2-door","4-door", and "Hardtop."

Partway through this year and in limited quantities, a new 427 replaced the 406 for racing applications. It was intended to meet NHRA and NASCAR 7-liter maximum engine size rules. This engine was rated at a 425 hp (317 kW) (gross horsepower) with 2 x 4 barrel Holley carburetors and a solid lifter camshaft.

The 1963½ was still overweight, however. To be competitive in drag racing Ford produced 212 (around 170 from Ford Norfolk, about 20 from Ford Los Angeles) lightweight versions of the "R" code 427, in the Galaxie 500 Sport Special Tudor Fastback. Available only in Corinthian White with red vinyl interior, and with a list price of about US$4,200 (when a base Ford 300 went for US$2,324, and XL Fastback was US$3,268), these cars came stock with Borg-Warner T-10 four-speed, 4.11:1 rear axle, heavy-duty suspension and brakes, and were fitted with a fiberglass hood (a flat piece at first, late in 1963 the popular blister hood also used on the Thunderbolt), trunk, front fenders, and fender aprons, as well as aluminum bumpers and mounting brackets, transmission cases, and bellhousing. Hood springs, heater, trunk lining and mat, spare wheel and tire (and mounting bracket), trunk lid torsion bar, jack, lug wrench, one horn (of the stock two), armrests, rear ashtrays, courtesy lights, and dome light were removed to reduce weight. The first 20 cars had functional fiberglass doors, which shaved 25 lb (11 kg); these were deleted because of Ford's concern for safety if used on the highway. The cars had all sound-deadening material removed, lightweight seats and floormats, and no options. They were not factory equipped with cold-air induction, as the Thunderbolt would be. In addition, they were built on the 45-pound (20 kg)-lighter Ford 300 chassis, originally intended for a smaller-displacement V8. In all, the 427s were 375 lb (170 kg) lighter than before (425 lb (193 kg) with the fiberglass doors).

The first two lightweight Galaxies, using 289 cu in (5 L) bodies, were assembled at Wayne, Michigan, late in January 1963, to be tested at the 1963 Winternats. They were delivered to Tasca Ford (East Providence, Rhode Island) and Bob Ford (Dearborn, Michigan). Bill Lawton's Tasca Galaxie turned the best performance, with a 12.50 pass at 116.60 mph (187.65 km/h). It was not enough against the 1963 Chevrolet Impala Z-11s in Limited Production/Stock, however.

Three more were assembled from parts and tested at Ford's Experimental Garage in Dearborn. One of the next two, the last Winternationals test cars, was prepared by Bill Stroppe in Long Beach, California, for Les Ritchey; it was featured in the July 1963 issue of Hot Rod. For all their efforts, Ford discovered the Galaxies were still too heavy, and the project was abandoned. Some of these cars competed in England, Australia and South Africa after being modified by Holman and Moody who fitted them with disc brakes and other circuit racing components. Jack Sears won the 1963 British Saloon Car Championship driving Galaxies and Cortinas and the racing Galaxies were also driven by Sir Jack Brabham, Graham Hill and other notable drivers of the period. The heavy Galaxies suffered from persistent brake failure that led to a number of crashes, and in late 1963 started using the 12-inch disc brakes from the Ford GT40 program. By this time the Lotus Cortinas were being developed and the big Galaxie became uncompetitive.

1964

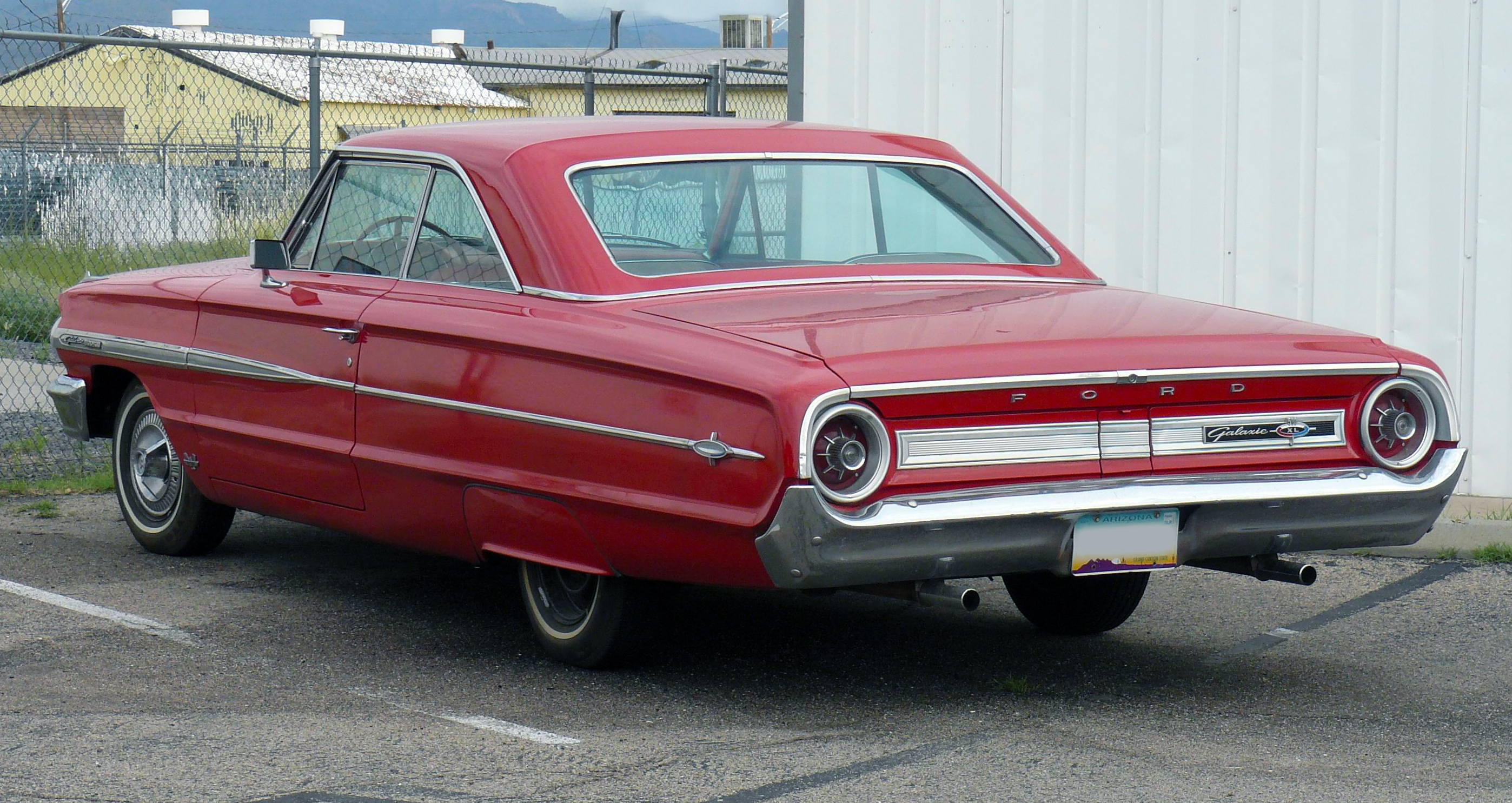
1964 Ford Galaxie 500

Model year 1964 was the fourth and final year of this body style. Interior trim was altered, and the exterior featured a more sculpted look which was actually designed to make the car more aerodynamic for NASCAR. The formal-roof "boxtop" style was no longer available, all non-wagon models now featuring the "fastback" roof design that was the runaway best-seller in 1963. The base 300 was replaced by a line of Custom and Custom 500 models. The 289 continued as the base V8 and was standard in the XL series. XL models got new thin-shell bucket seats with chrome trim. Federal regulations now required lap-style safety belts for both front outboard occupants. The ignition switch was moved from the left side of the steering column, to the right, but otherwise the attractive instrument panel remained unchanged from '63. The 1964 XL two-door hardtop became the best seller of any XL produced in any year.

The 427 cu in (7.0 L) engine was used in 50 lightweight fiberglass-equipped cars for drag racing. These competed in North America but were still too heavy and Ford introduced the lightweight Fairlane Thunderbolt.

The Ford Country Squire station wagon, while wearing "Country Squire" badging, was actually part of the Galaxie 500 line. Some Country Squires had "Galaxie 500" badging on the glovebox indicating the series name. These station wagons featured the same trims as Galaxie 500s, and were a step up from the base-model Country Sedan.

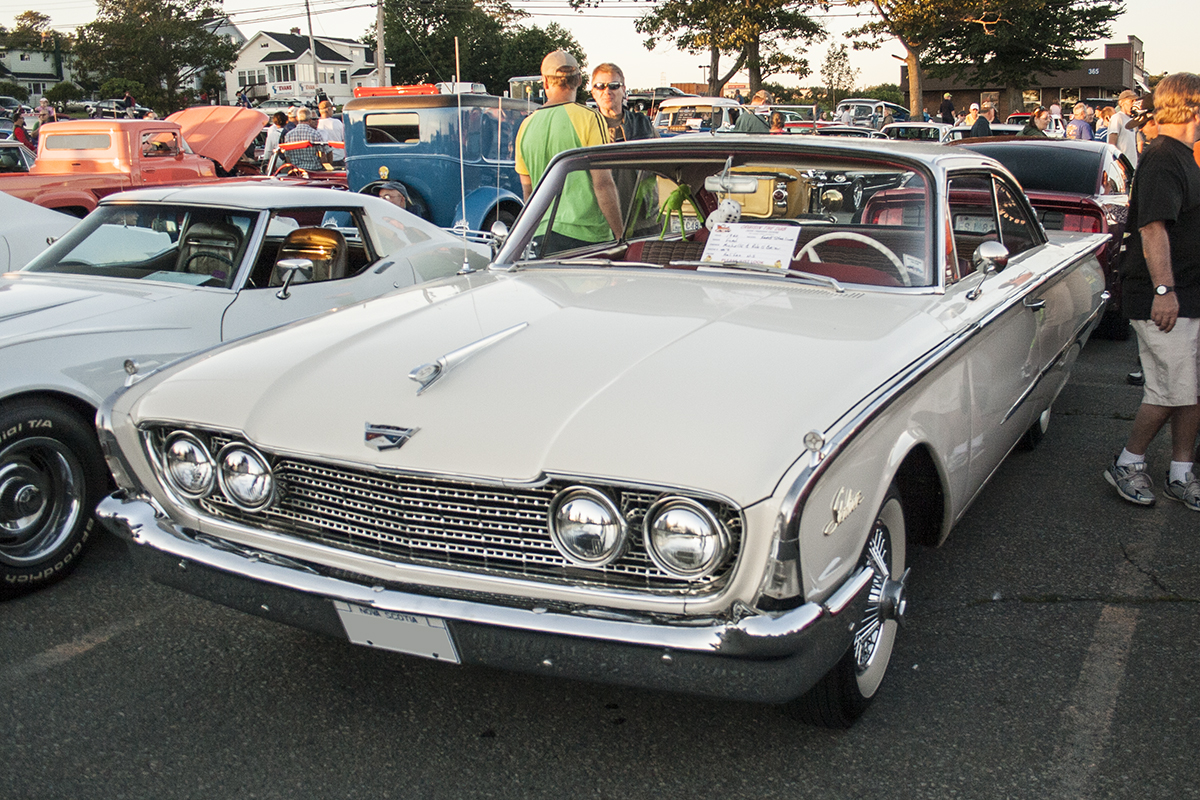
1960 Ford Galaxie Starliner hardtop

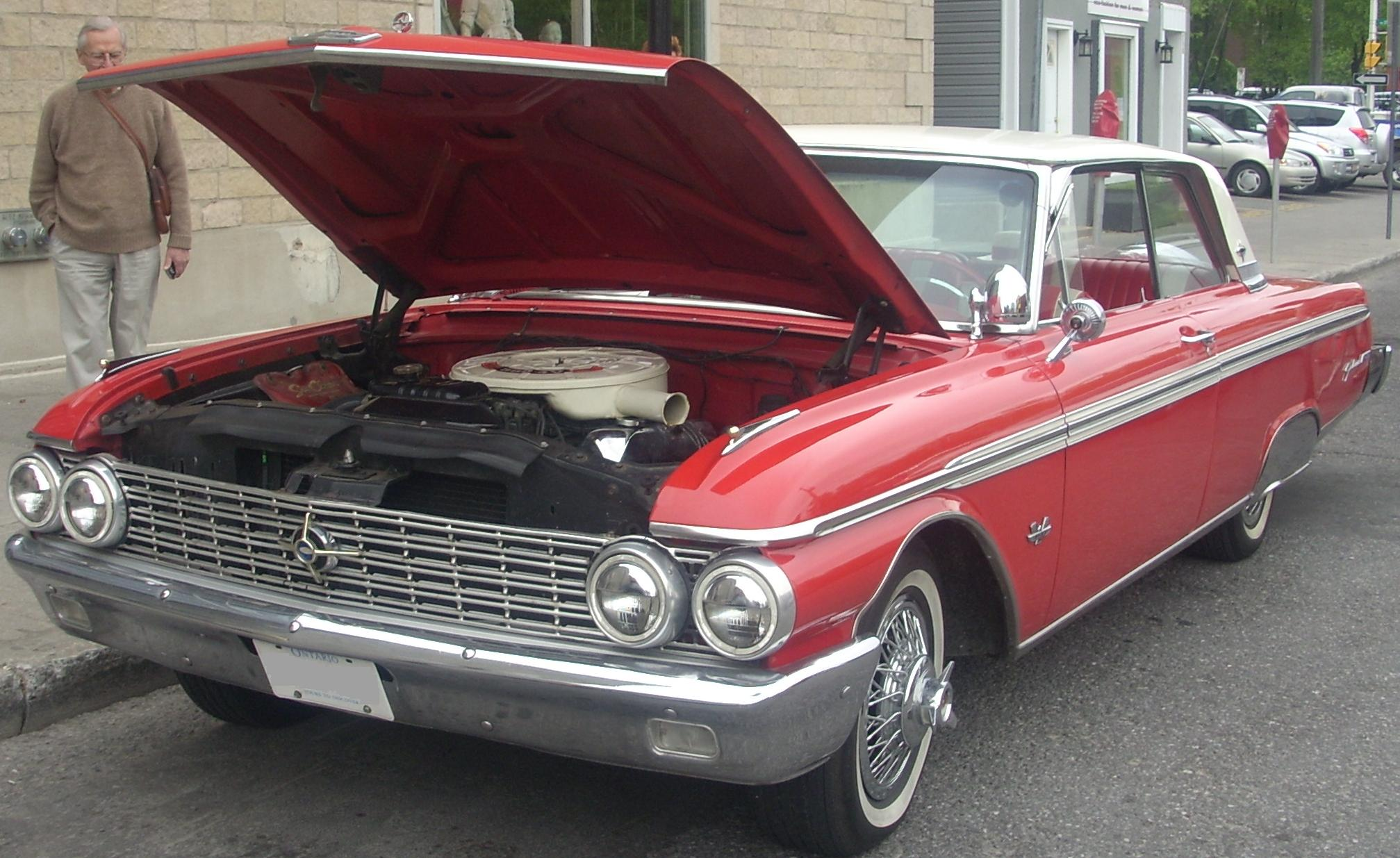
1962 Ford Galaxie coupe

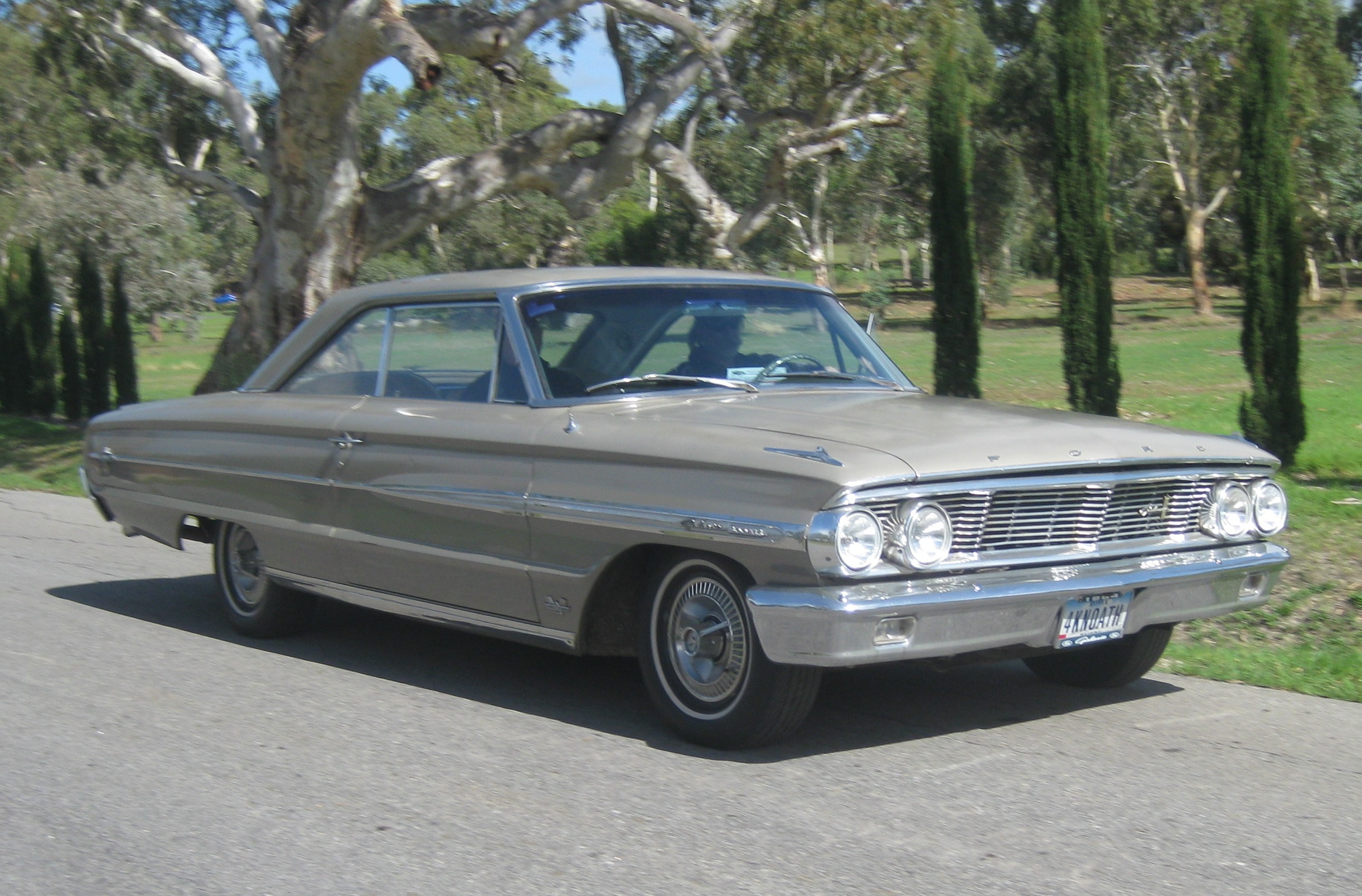
1964 Ford Galaxie 500/XL 2-door hardtop

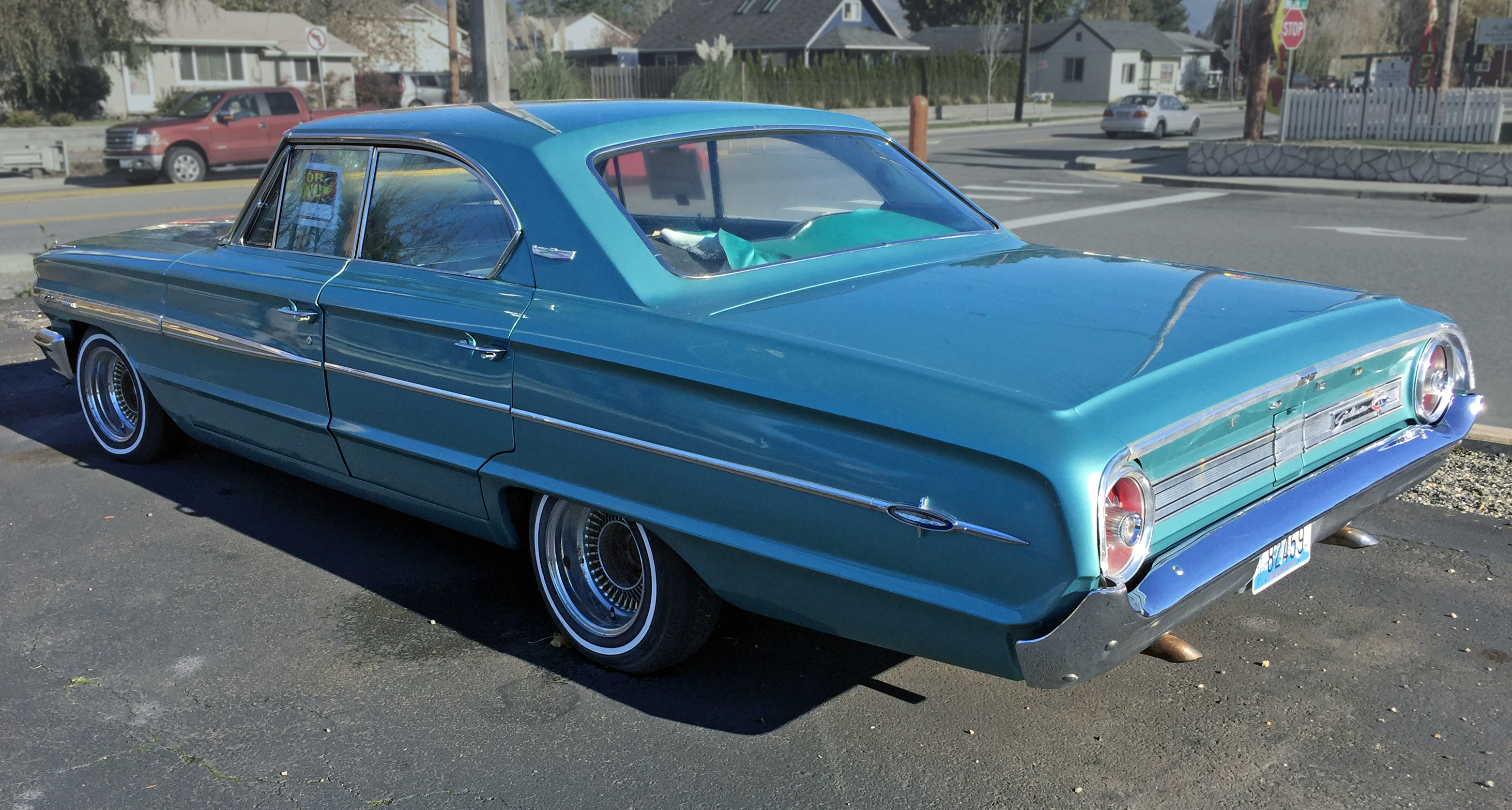
1964 Ford Galaxie 500/XL 4-door hardtop (rear)

== 1965–1968 ==
Third generation
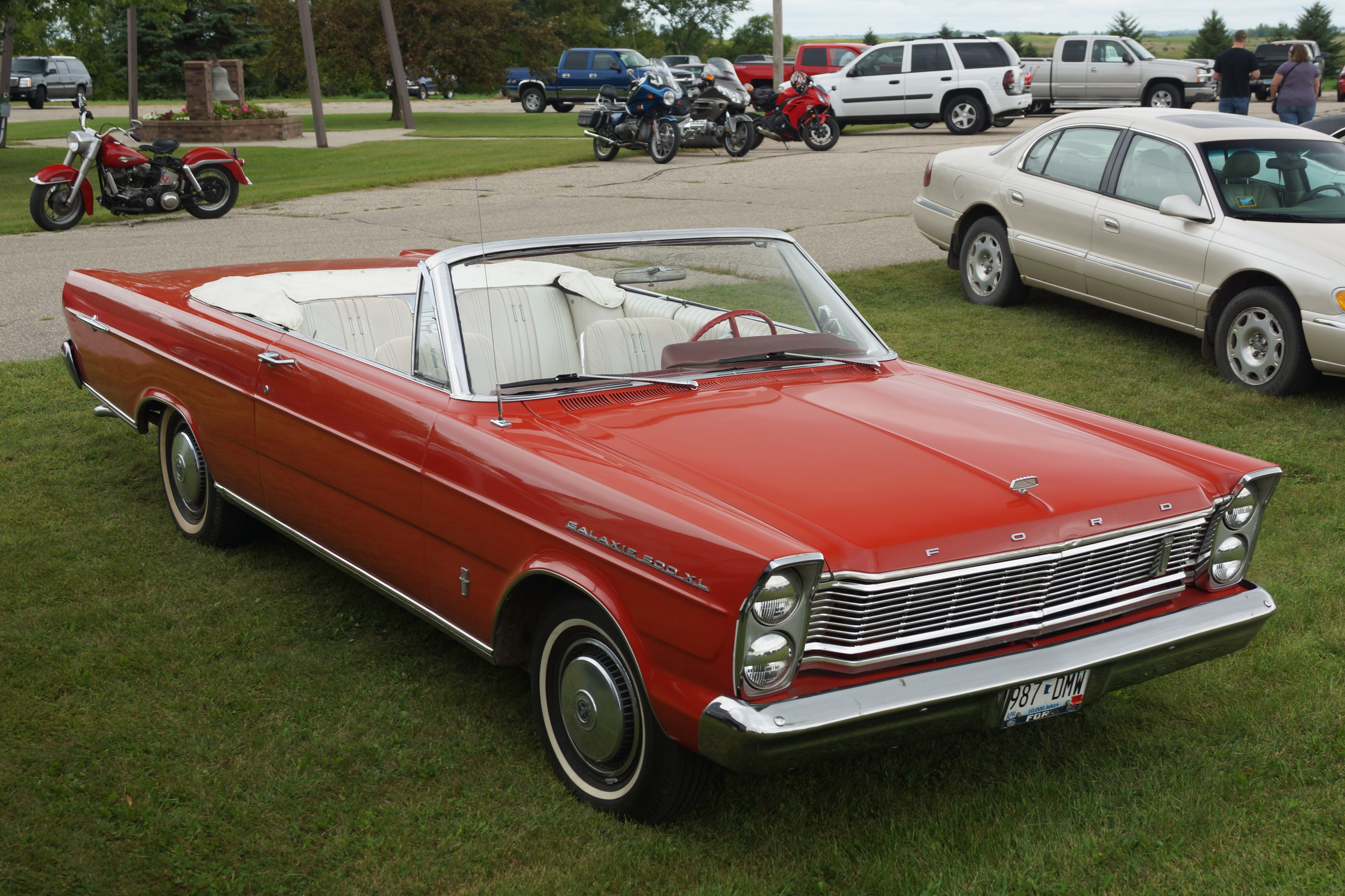
- 1965 Galaxie 500 XL (convertible)

Overview
- Production: 1964–1968 (North America); 1964–1968 (Australia); 1967–1983 (Brazil)
- Model years: 1965–1968

Body and chassis
- Body style: 2-door hardtop; 4-door sedan; 4-door hardtop; 2-door convertible
- Related: Ford Custom; Ford LTD; Ford Ranch Wagon; Ford Country Sedan; Ford Country Squire; Mercury Monterey; Mercury Montclair; Mercury Park Lane; Mercury Marauder (1965); Mercury S-55 (1966–1967); Mercury Marquis (1967–1968); Mercury Commuter; Mercury Colony Park

Powertrain
- Engine: 240 cu in (3.9 L) Big Block 6 I6; 272 cu in (4.5 L) Y-Block V8 (Brazil); 289 cu in (4.7 L) Windsor V8; 292 cu in (4.8 L) Y-Block V8 (Brazil); 302 cu in (4.9 L) Windsor V8; 352 cu in (5.8 L) FE V8; 390 cu in (6.4 L) FE V8; 427 cu in (7.0 L) FE V8; 428 cu in (7.0 L) FE V8

Dimensions
- Length: 213 in (5,410 mm)

The 1965 Galaxie was an all-new design, featuring vertically stacked dual headlights. The cars were taller and bulkier than the previous year's. The new top-of-the-line designation was the Galaxie 500 LTD and Galaxie 500 XL. The LTD and the XL trim package were accessory upgrades from the base Galaxie model. Engine choices were the same as 1964, except for an all-new 240 cu in (3.9 L) six-cylinder engine replacing the 1950s-era 223 "Mileage-Maker" six and the 352 was now equipped with dual exhausts and a four-barrel carburetor.

Suspension on the 1965 models was redesigned. Replacing the former leaf-spring rear suspension was a new three-link system, with coil springs. Interiors featured a new instrument panel, as well as two-way key vehicle access: the introduction of two keys was for valet parking, where the rounded head key would only open the trunk or locked glove compartment, while the squared-head key would only unlock the doors and the ignition.

The 1966 model had slight Coke bottle styling and new horizontally split grille, among other small changes.

A new model was introduced for 1966; the Galaxie 500 7 Litre, fitted with a new engine, the 345 hp 428 cu in (7.0 L) Thunderbird V8. This engine was also available on the Ford Thunderbird and the Mercury S-55. The police versions received a 360 hp version of the 428 known as the 'Police Interceptor' as police cars. Safety regulations for 1966 required seat belts front and rear on all new cars sold domestically. The Galaxie 500 would be the number three-selling convertible in the U.S. in 1966, with 27,454 sold; it was beaten by the Mustang (at 72,119, by nearly 2.5:1) and by the Impala at 38,000. A parking brake light on the dashboard and an AM/FM radio were optional. The 1966 LTD dropped the Galaxie name.

The 1966 body style was introduced in Brazil (Ford do Brasil) as a 1967 model; it used the same platform and body throughout its lifetime until Brazilian production ended in 1983. A vehicle of this model was used by Queen Elizabeth during her visit to Chile in 1968, and has since been preserved by the Chilean government as a ceremonial state car.

For 1967, the 7 Litre model no longer carried the Galaxie name; it was to be the last year of it being separately identified. That identification was mainly trim such as horn ring and dashboard markings as well as the "Q" in the Vehicle Identification Number. The 7 Litre for 1967 was a trim and performance option on the Ford XL, which was now a separate model as well. Little else changed, except for trim and the styling; the same engines were available, from the 240 cu in (3.9 L) six-cylinder to the 428 cu in (7.0 L) V8. Modifications to the styling included adding a major bend in the center of the grille and making the model less "boxy" than the 1966 model. An 8-track tape cartridge player became an option. Back-up lights were standard.

For 1967 all Fords featured a large, padded hub in the center of the plastic steering wheel, along with an energy-absorbing steering column (introduced late into the 1967 model year), padded interior surfaces, recessed controls on the instrument panel, and front outboard shoulder belt anchors. Another safety related change was the introduction of the dual brake master cylinder used on all subsequent Galaxies (and other Ford models).

The 1968 model had a new grille with headlights arranged horizontally, although the body was essentially the same car from the windshield back. The 'long hood, short deck' style with a more upright roofline and a notchback rear was followed too, as was the new trend for concealed headlights on the XL and LTD. One other change for 1968 was that the base V8 engine increased from 289 cu in (4.7 L) to 302 cu in (4.9 L). Standard equipment included courtesy lights, a cigarette lighter, a suspended gas pedal, and padded front seat backs.

The 1968 models featured additional safety features, including side marker lights and shoulder belts on cars built after December 1, 1967. The 1967 model's large steering wheel hub was replaced by a soft "bar" spoke that ran through the diameter of the wheel (and like the 1967 style, was used throughout the Ford Motor Company line). A plastic horn ring was also featured.

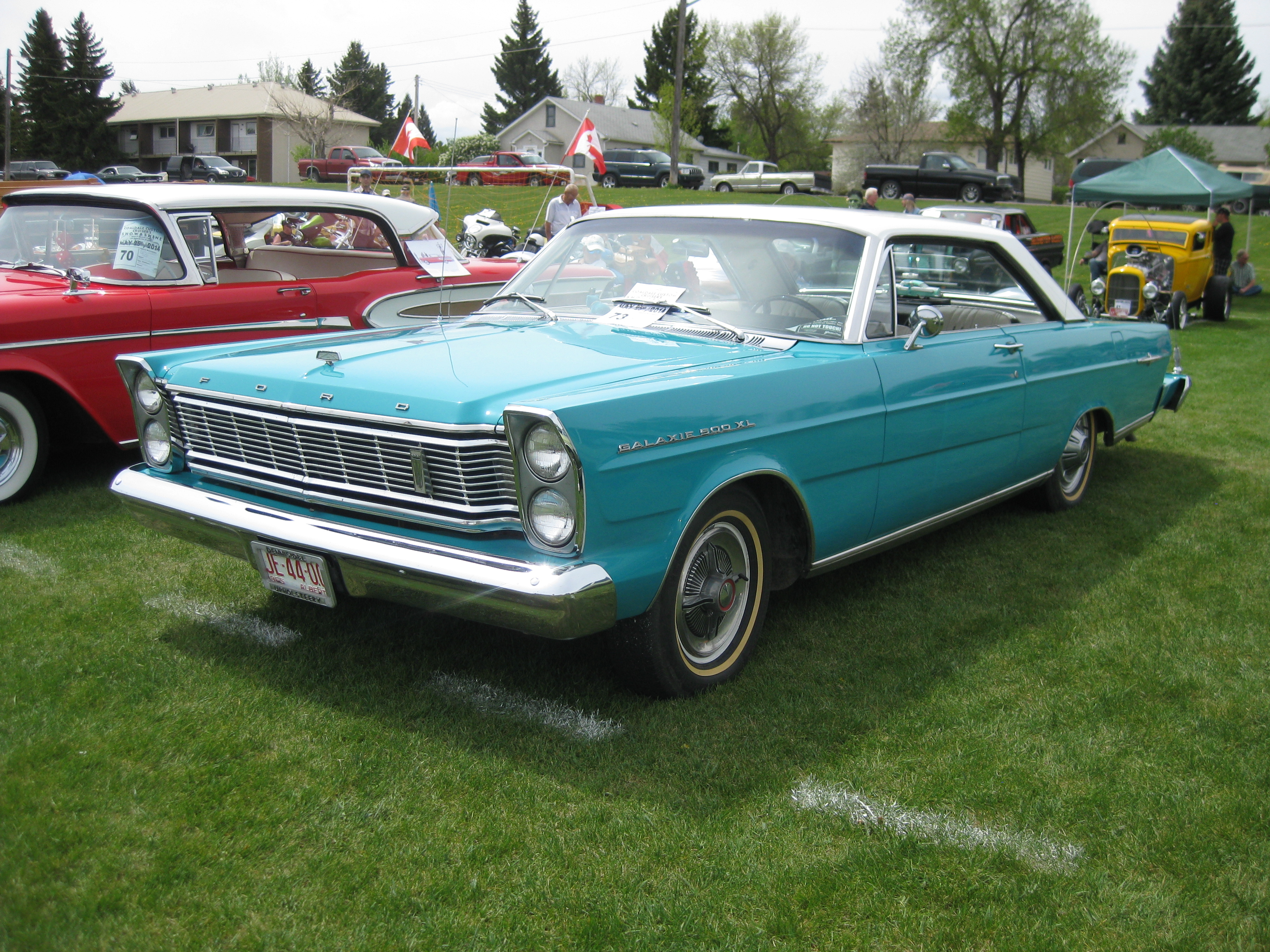
1965 Ford Galaxie 500/XL 2-Door Hardtop

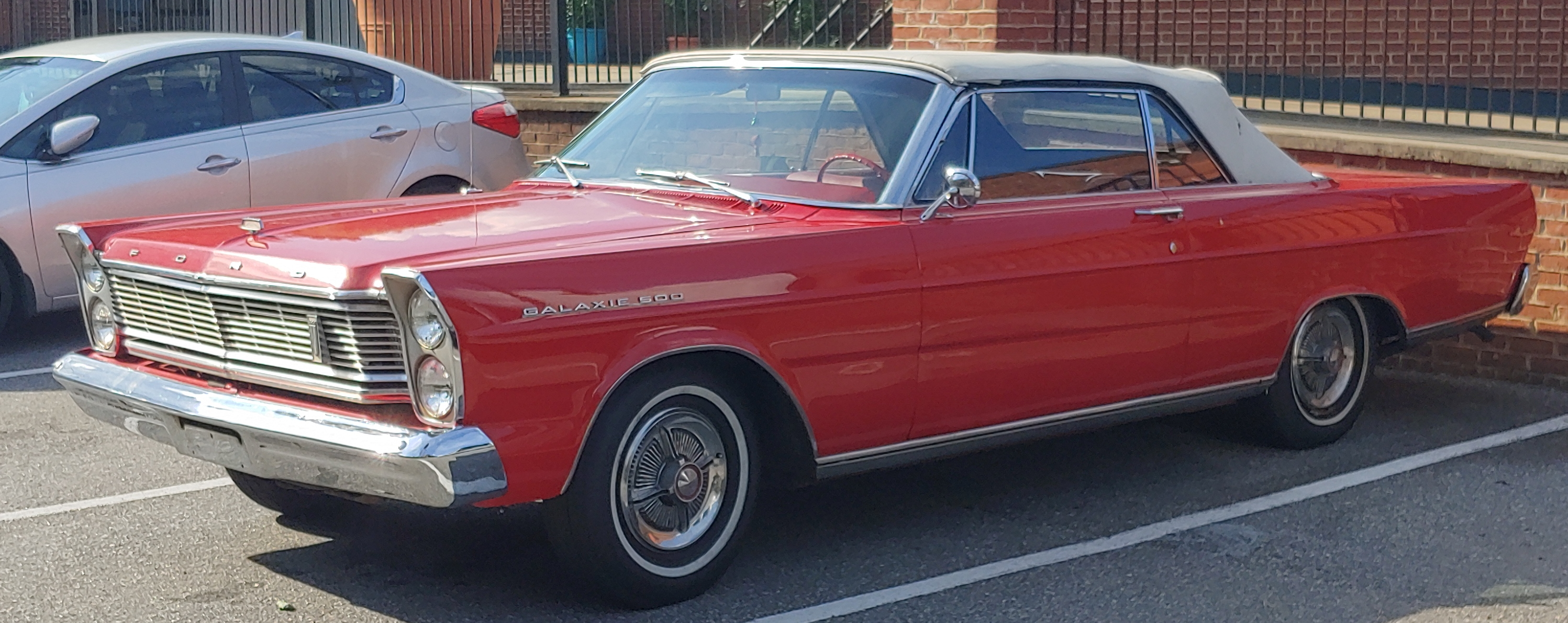
1965 Ford Galaxie 500 Convertible

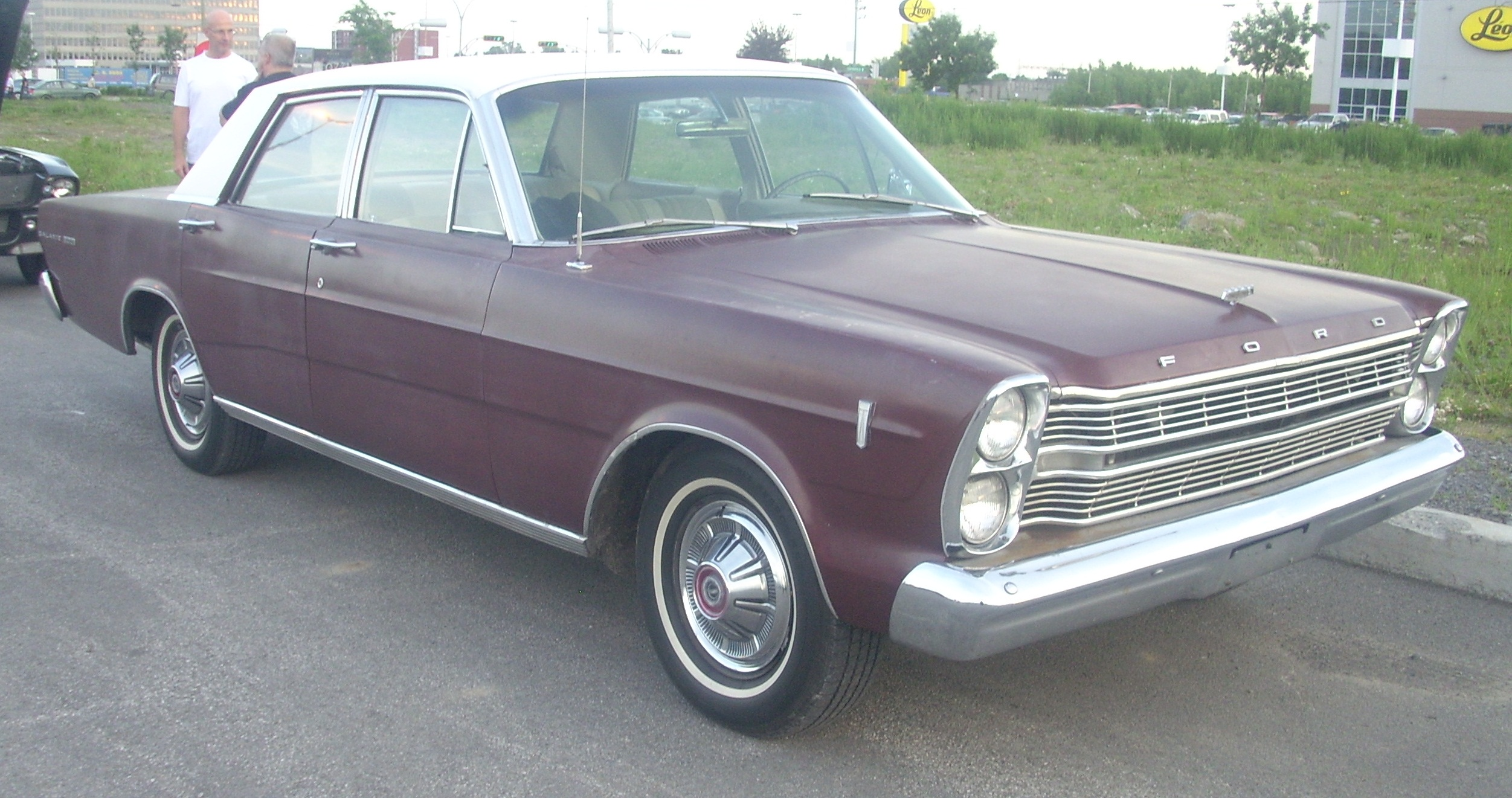
1966 Ford Galaxie 500 4-Door Sedan

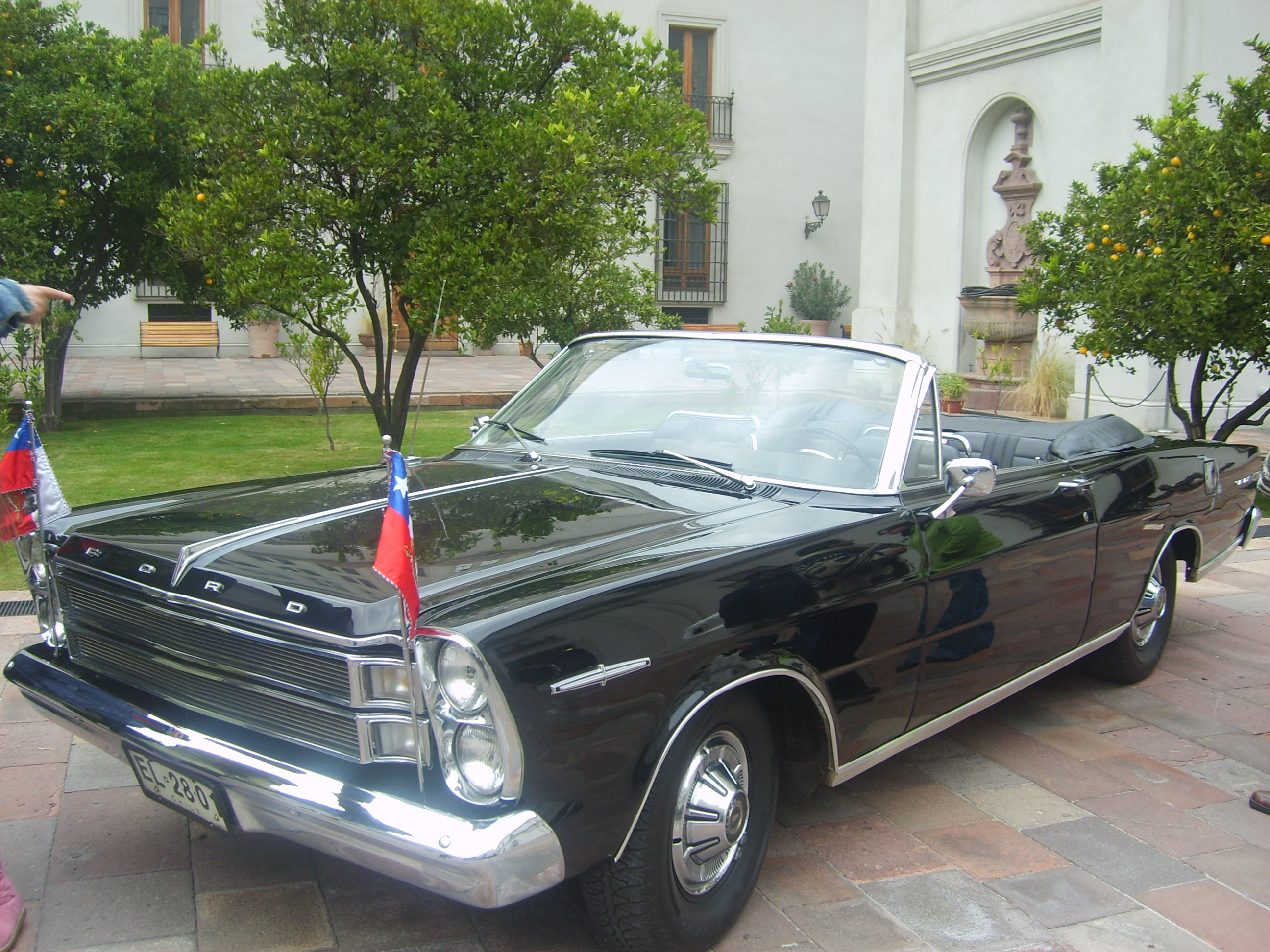
1966 Ford Galaxie 500/XL Convertible used as a presidential car in Chile

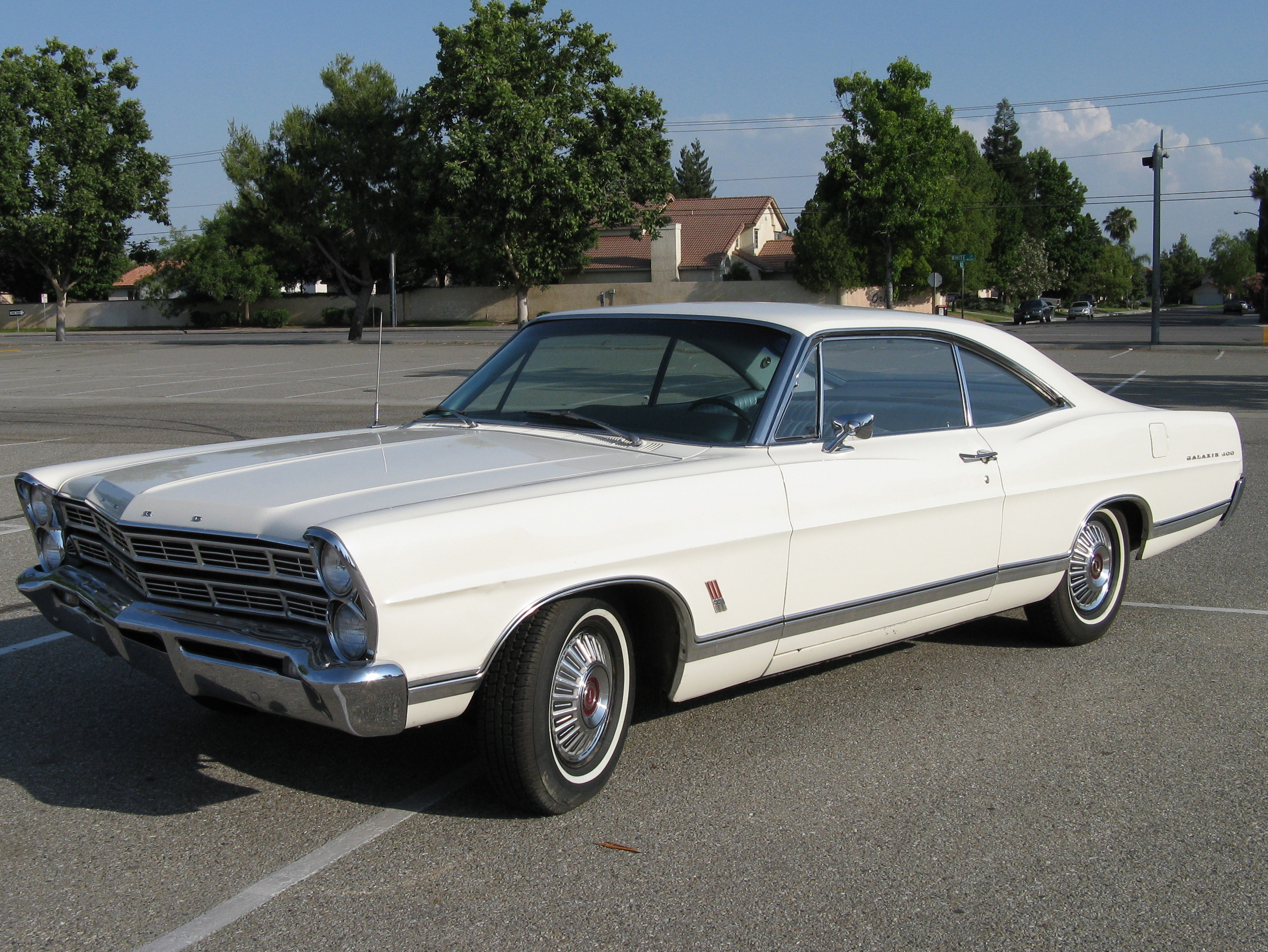
1967 Ford Galaxie 500 2-Door Hardtop

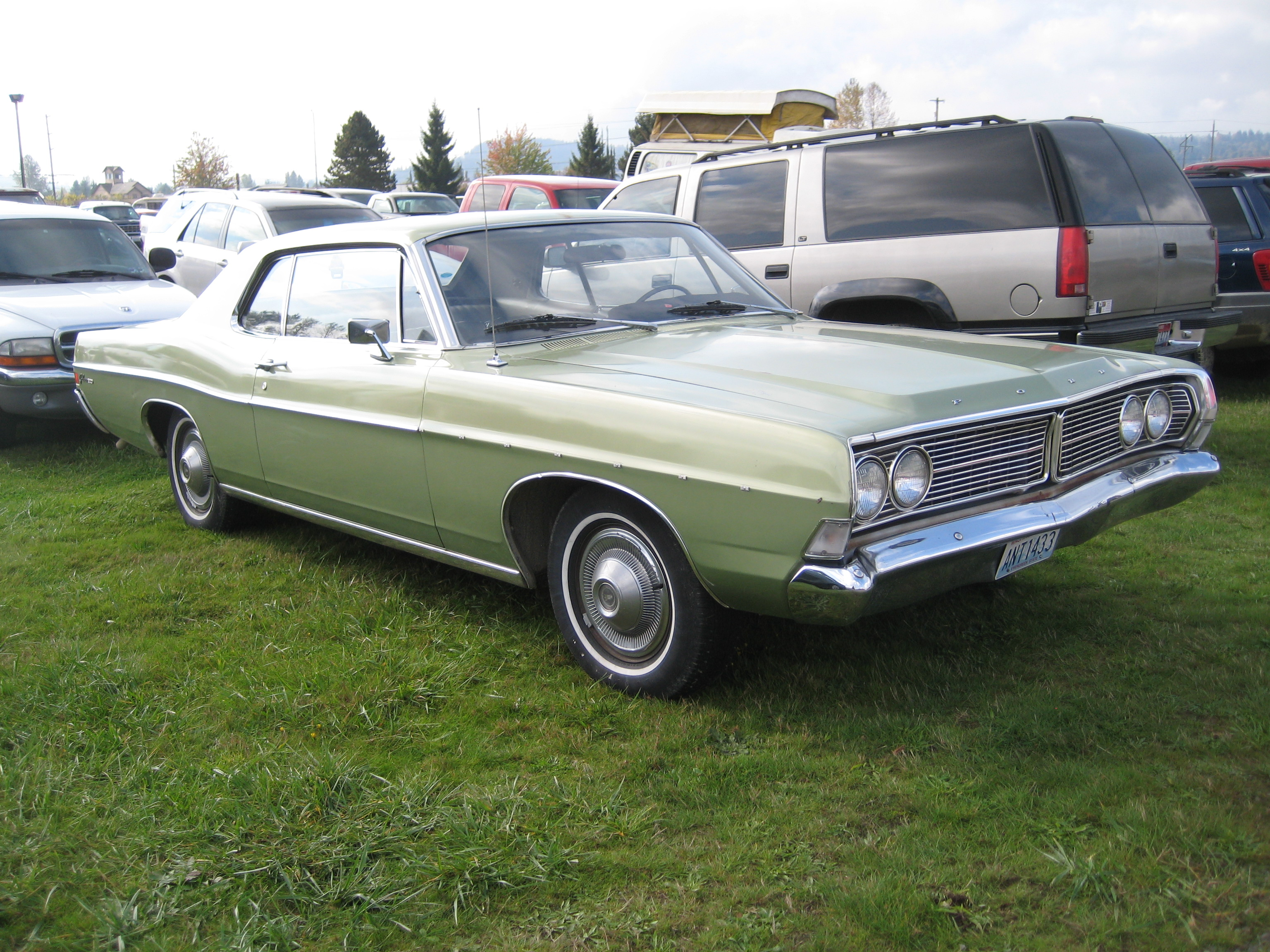
1968 Ford Galaxie 500 2-Door Hardtop

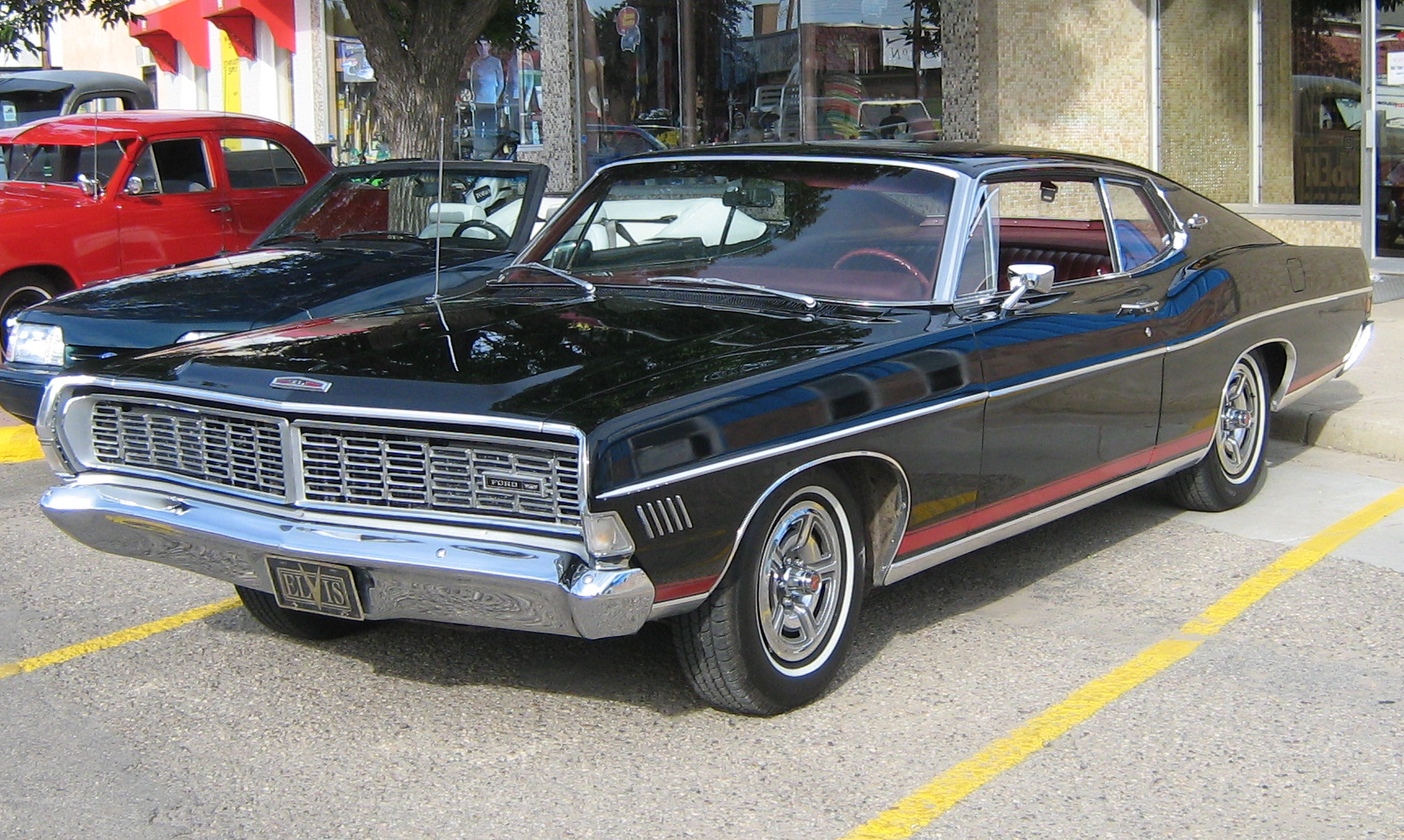
1968 Ford XL Hardtop

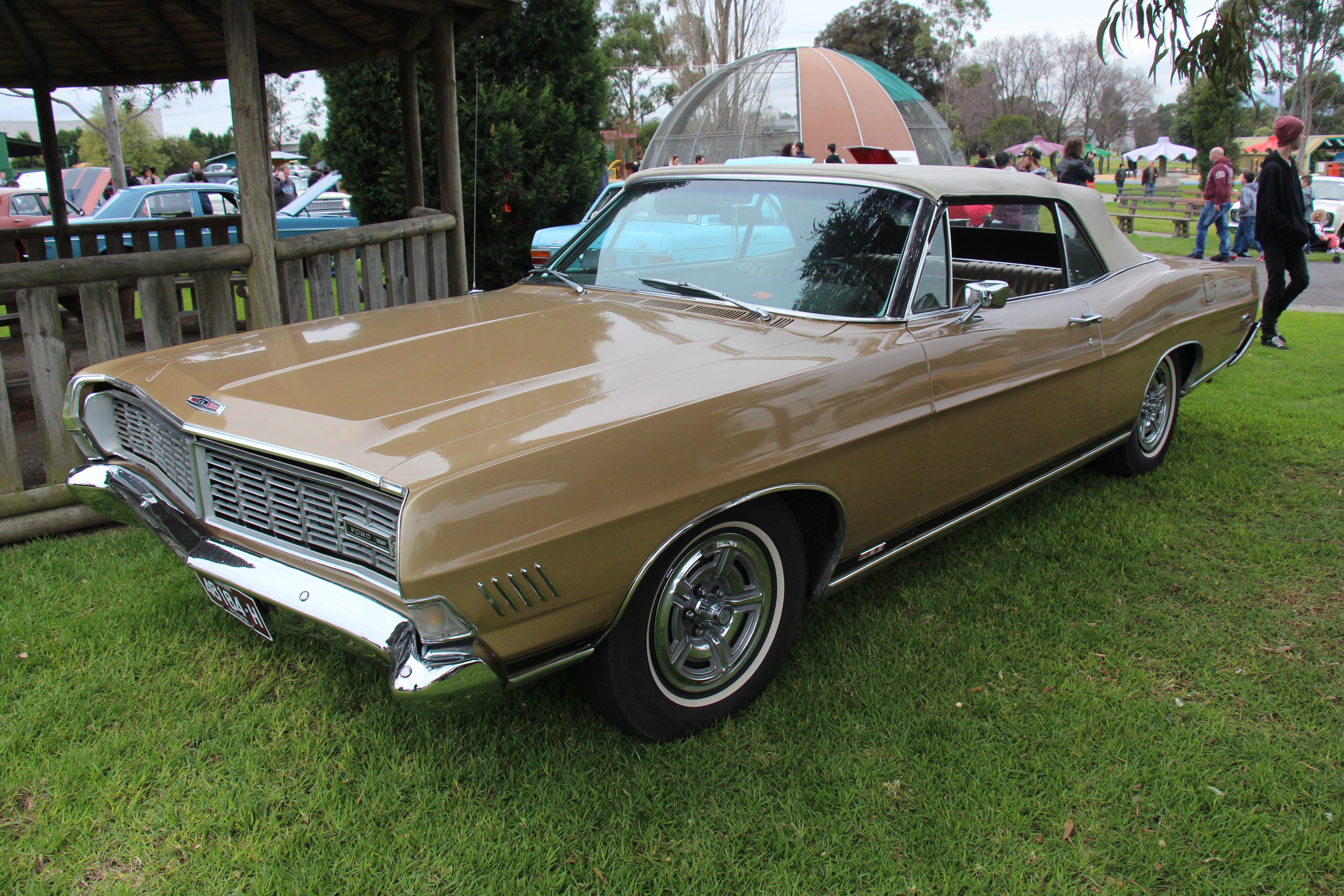
1968 Ford XL Convertible

== 1969–1974 ==
Fourth generation
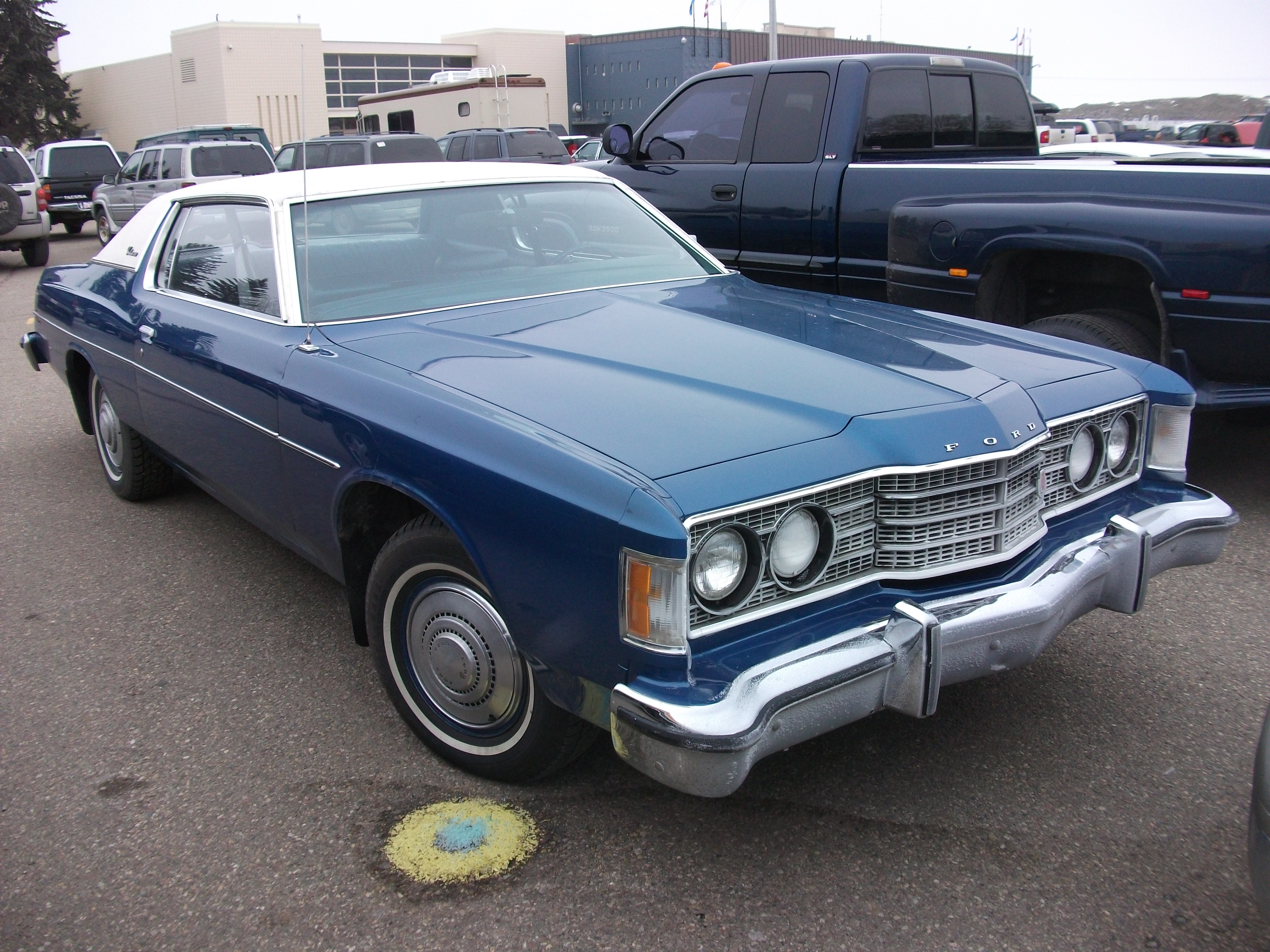
- 1974 Ford Galaxie 500 2-Door Hardtop

Overview
- Production: 1968–1974
- Model years: 1969–1974

Body and chassis
- Body style: 2-door hardtop; 4-door sedan; 4-door hardtop; 4-door station wagon; 2-door convertible
- Related: Ford Custom; Ford LTD; Ford XL Ford Ranch Wagon; Ford Country Sedan; Ford Country Squire; Mercury Monterey; Mercury Marquis; Mercury Marauder; Mercury Colony Park

Powertrain
- Engine: 240 cu in (3.9 L) I6; 302 cu in (4.9 L) Windsor V8; 351 cu in (5.8 L) Windsor V8; 390 cu in (6.4 L) FE V8; 400 cu in (6.6 L) 335 V8; 429 cu in (7.0 L) 385 V8; 460 cu in (7.5 L) 385 V8

Dimensions
- Length: 213.9 in (5,433 mm)

The 1969 model was built on a new platform with a 121-inch (3,100 mm) wheelbase. It was the end for the 427 and 428 engines, save for only the police package versions which continued to use the 360 hp 428 P Code 'Police Interceptor' as their top motor for 1969-70. Replacing the FE series-based 427 and 428 engines was the new 429 cu in (7.0 L) "ThunderJet" that was introduced in the 1968 Ford Thunderbird; it was part of the new Ford 385 engine series. Power, at 360 hp (270 kW) for the dual-exhaust 4-barrel version, was higher than the 428's 345 hp (257 kW) and lower than the racing-bred 427's final rating of 390 hp (290 kW); there was also a single-exhaust 2-barrel version with 320 hp (240 kW) available. The dashboard was built as a pod around the driver rather than traditionally extending across both sides. The XL and Galaxie 500 Sportsroof had rear sail panels to simulate a fastback roofline. The rear trim panel below the tail lights was used to distinguish the different trim levels. The Country Squire was, perhaps, the pinnacle of design for that wagon with the concealed headlights.

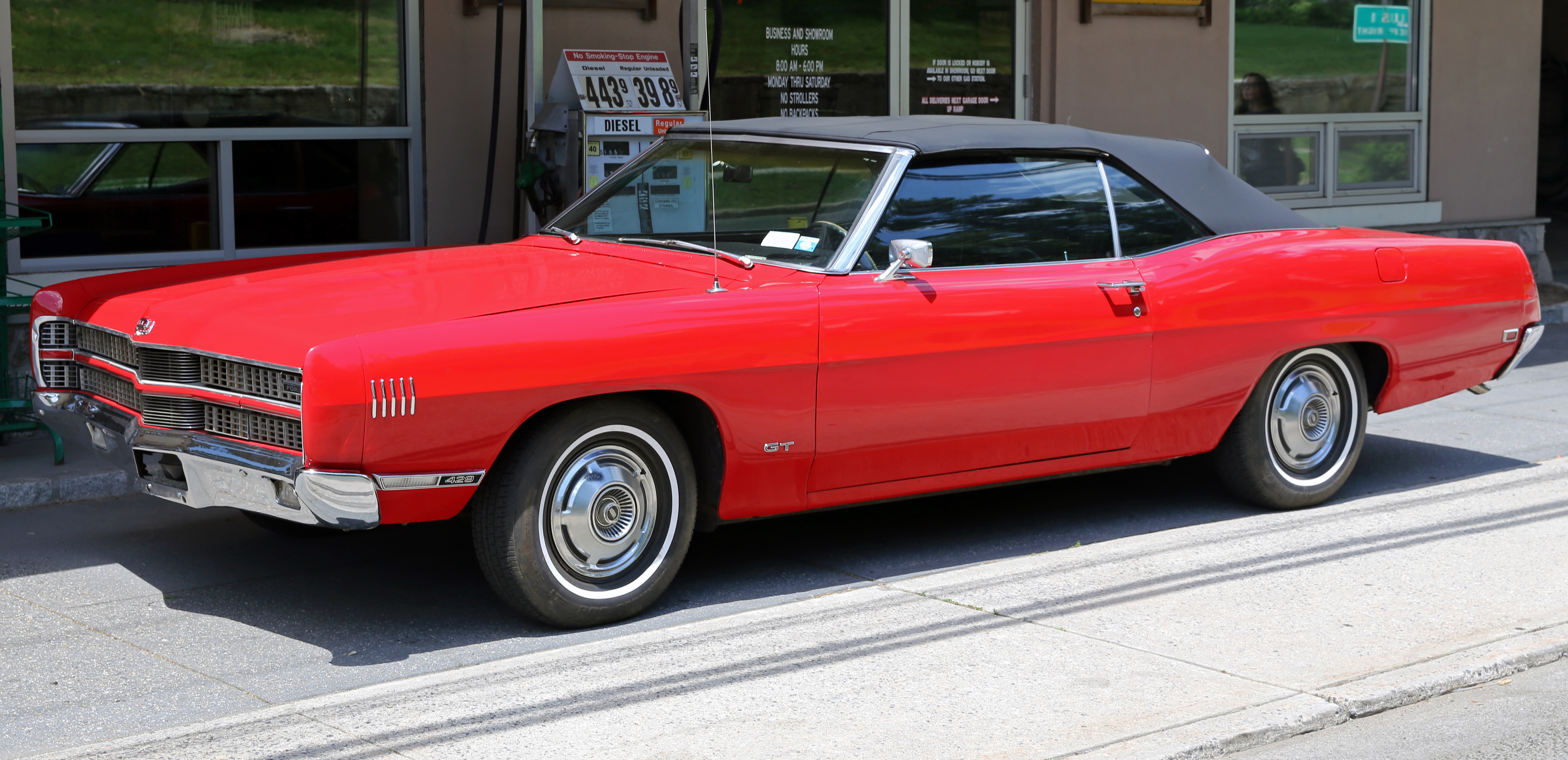
1969 Ford XL GT 429 convertible

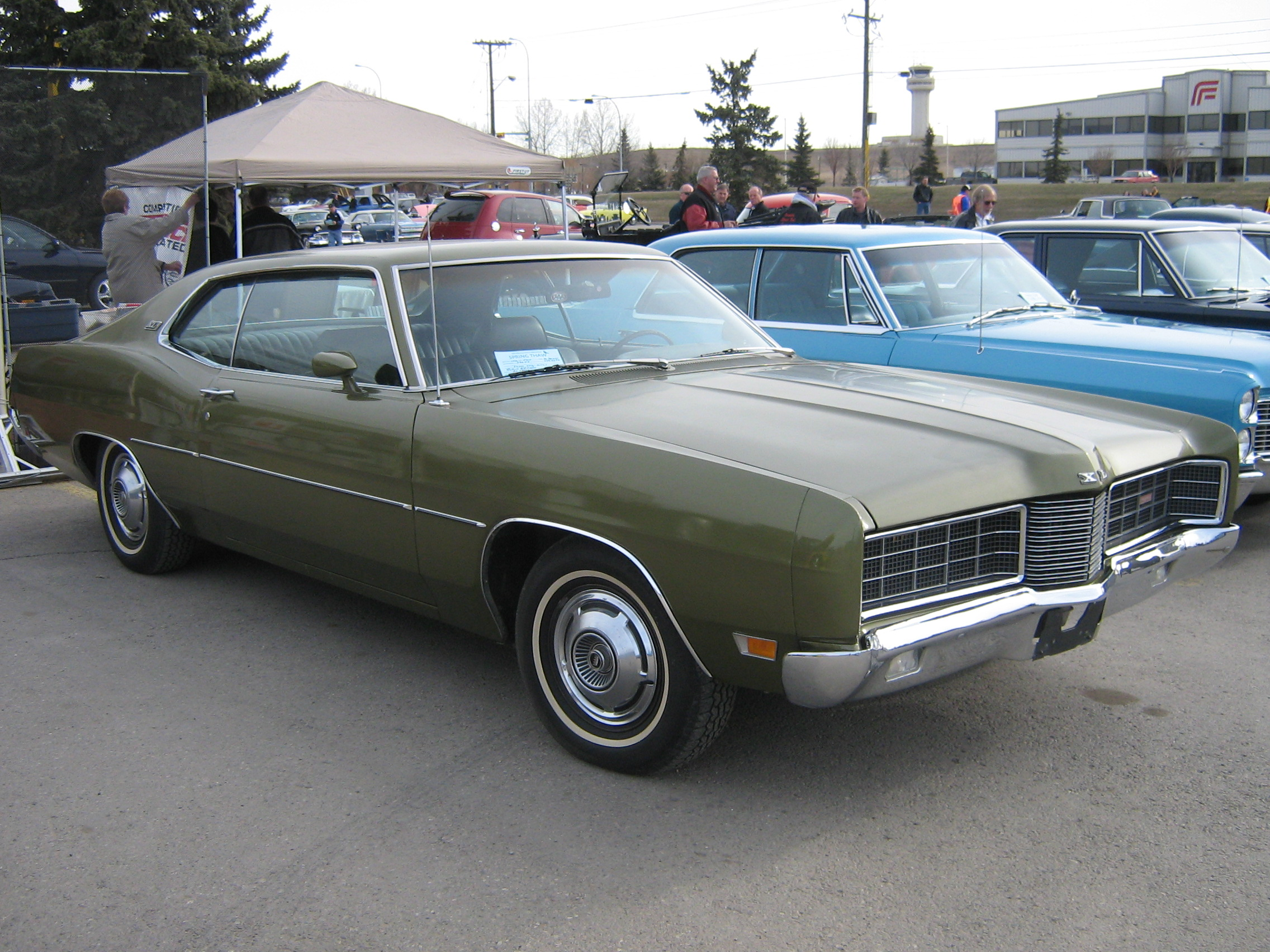
1970 Ford XL SportsRoof

Headrests were featured on 1969 model cars built after January 1, 1969. It was not until 1968 that a station wagon was actually marketed under the Galaxie name. From 1955 to 1968 full-size Ford wagons were treated as a separate model series and were listed as Ranch Wagon, Country Sedan, and Country Squire. For the 1969 model year a higher-trim Ranch Wagon was offered as the Custom 500 Ranch Wagon, the Country Sedan the Galaxie Country Sedan and the Country Squire was marketed as the LTD Country Squire.

Galaxies for model year 1970 received minor trim changes. A new ignition lock was located on the right side of the steering column. Model year 1970 was the last year for the XL, but Galaxie 500 hardtop coupes were also available in both formal-roof and SportsRoof body styles. The optional 4-speed manual transmission, which was available on the 429 the year prior, was dropped for 1970.

A complete redesign was offered for 1971. This included a horizontal wrap around front bumper with a massive vertical center section much in the vein of concurrent Pontiacs. Taillights lost the traditional "rocket" exhaust theme in favor of horizontal lights and trimmed center section. Rooflines were squared off and had a "formal" air. The XL was dropped, as were concealed headlight covers for the LTD. The convertible was moved to the LTD series in 1970 (1971 model year) and lasted through 1972. The engine line-up saw some changes for '71. The 351 2v V8 was now standard equipment on all full-sized Fords save for the lower-line Custom & Custom 500 versions where the 240 straight six was still the base power plant with a 302 2v V8 and up still offered as options. The optional 390 2v FE V8 was replaced mid-year by a new 335 series 400 2v V8. The 429 4v was still the top engine, while the police-only versions received a new 370 hp 429 'Police Interceptor' as their new top offering. A column-shifted 3-speed manual was still the base transmission on the 240, 302 and 351 engines with Select-Shift automatic being optional but mandatory on all of the larger engines.

Models for 1972 were similar but the vertical center grille section was now not so prominent as the front bumper now continued across it and the rear bumper was enlarged with inset taillamps. This was also the final year for the 240 cu in (3.9 L) six-cylinder engine and three-speed manual transmission (which was available only with the six-cylinder engine); all V8-powered Galaxies had SelectShift automatic transmission as standard equipment.

The 1973 model was marginally shorter than previous models, but had a heavier, bulker appearance. Three towing packages were optional, each with increasing towing capacity. For law men, there were multiple Police package versions available with engines ranging from the 351 2v to the powerful 460 Police Interceptor. Taxi packages continued to be offered as well. All 1973 full-sized Fords now came with a 351 2v V8-engine and SelectShift automatic transmission as their base driveline. Four-door sedans with metal door frames were replaced with a new "Pillared Hardtop" model which featured a thin "B" post and frameless door glass. This body style was offered together with the traditional pillarless four-door hardtop.

The 1974 model year was essentially a repeat of 1973, but it was the last year for the Galaxie 500 name. Ford elected to consolidate most of its full-size models under the popular LTD name for 1975, while reserving the base-model Custom 500 (which was below the Galaxie 500) nameplate for fleet buyers and private customers who insisted on the lowest-priced full-sized model possible. Power front disc brakes were standard.

The LTD stayed on as the top full-size model. Although a top seller and high-end model for many years, the Galaxie was slowly phased out and de-emphasized by Ford Motor Co. in an effort to push the posher LTD as a mainstream full size car.

Approximately 7,850,000 full-size Fords and Mercurys were sold over 1968–1978. This makes it the second best selling Ford automobile platform after the Ford Model T.

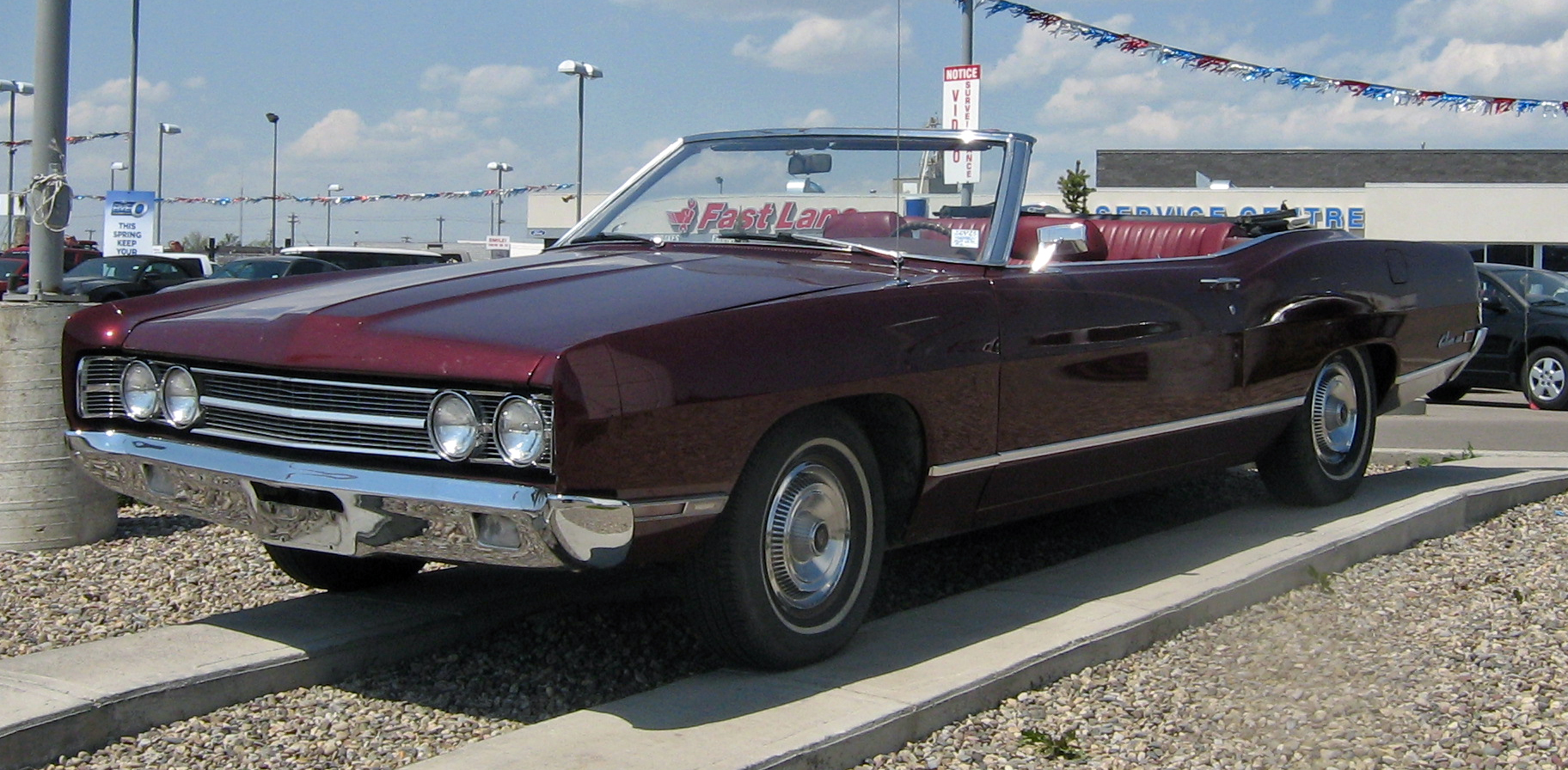
1969 Ford Galaxie 500 convertible

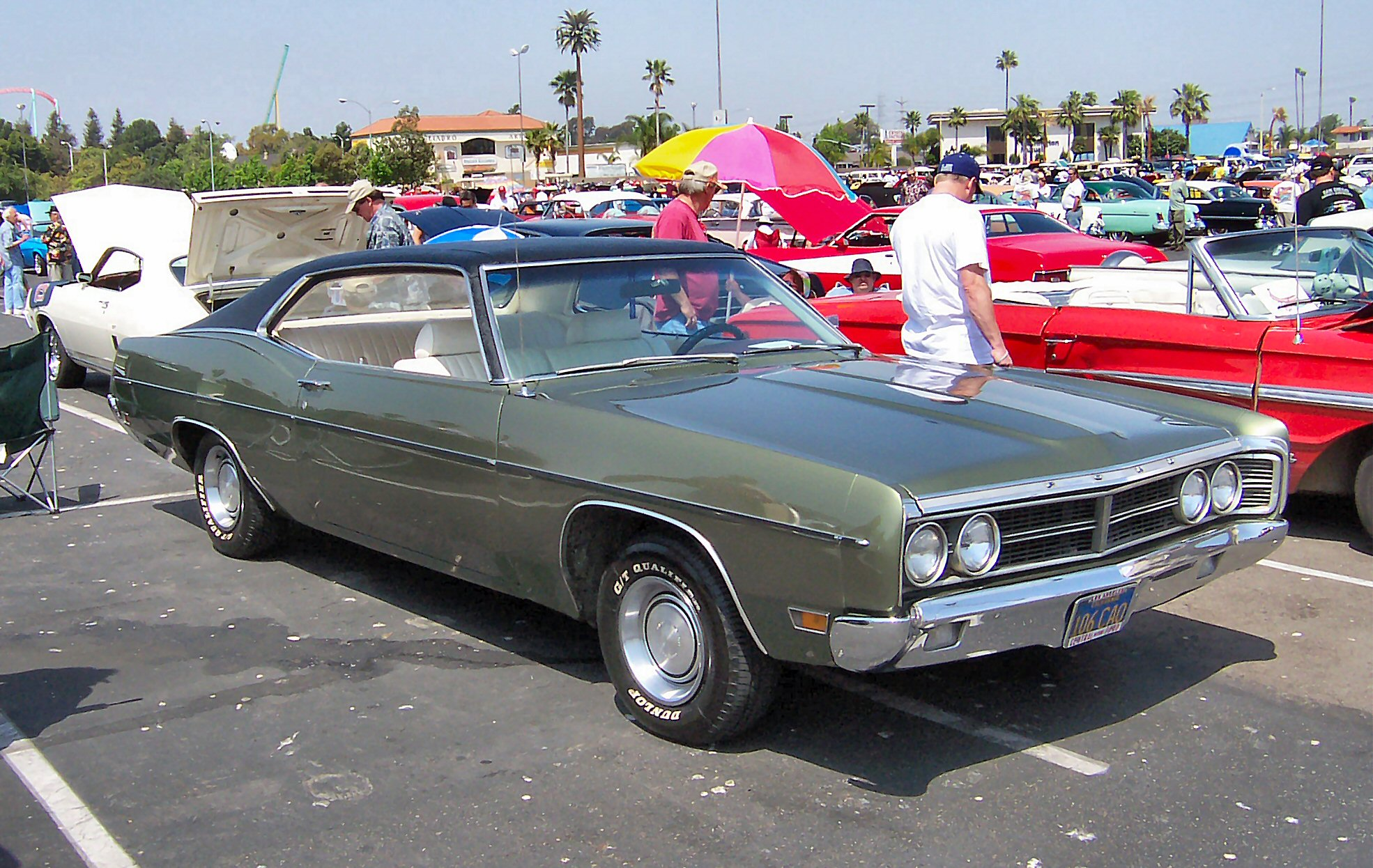
1970 Ford Galaxie 500 Sportsroof

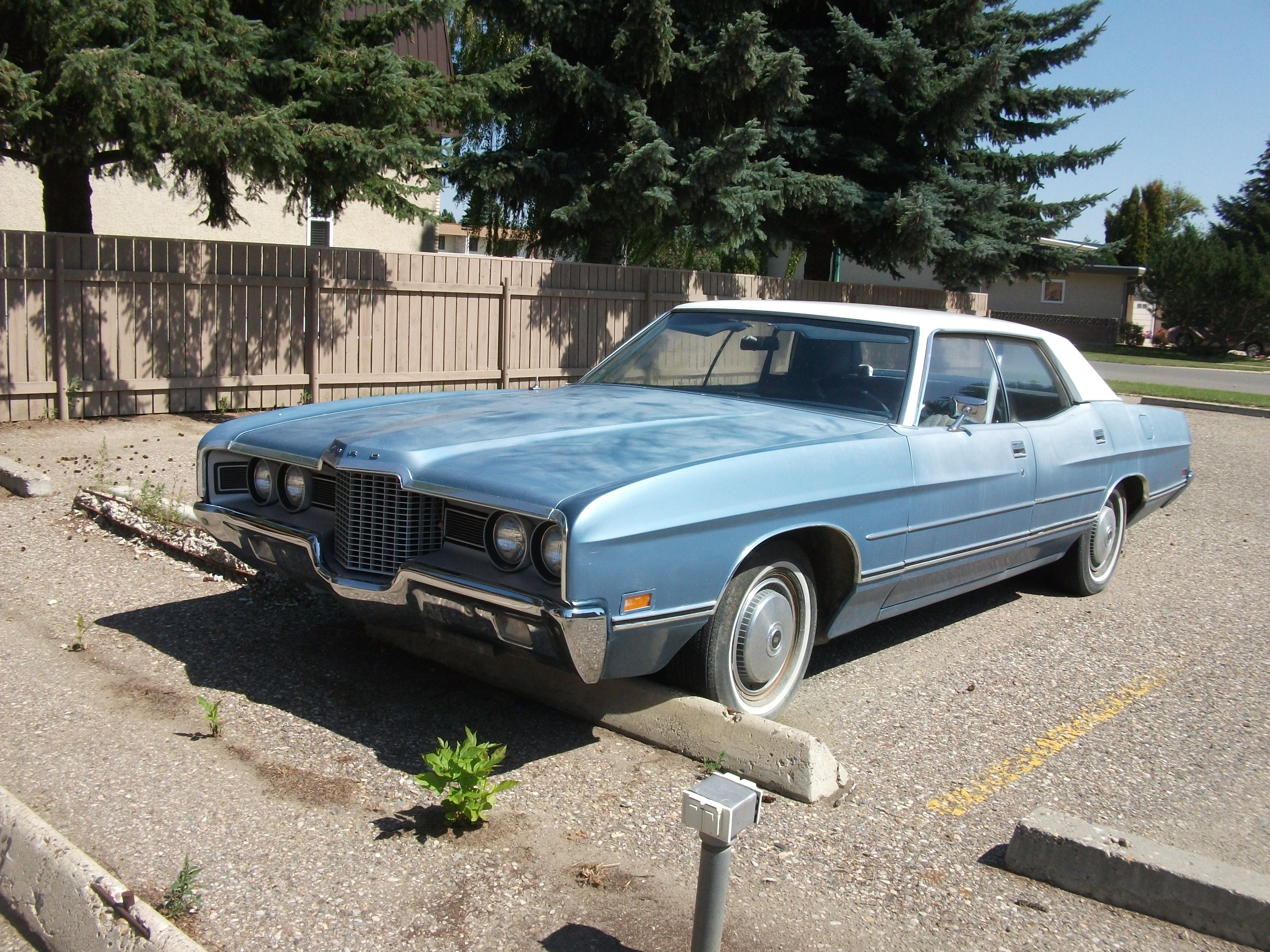
1971 Ford Galaxie 500 4-door Hardtop

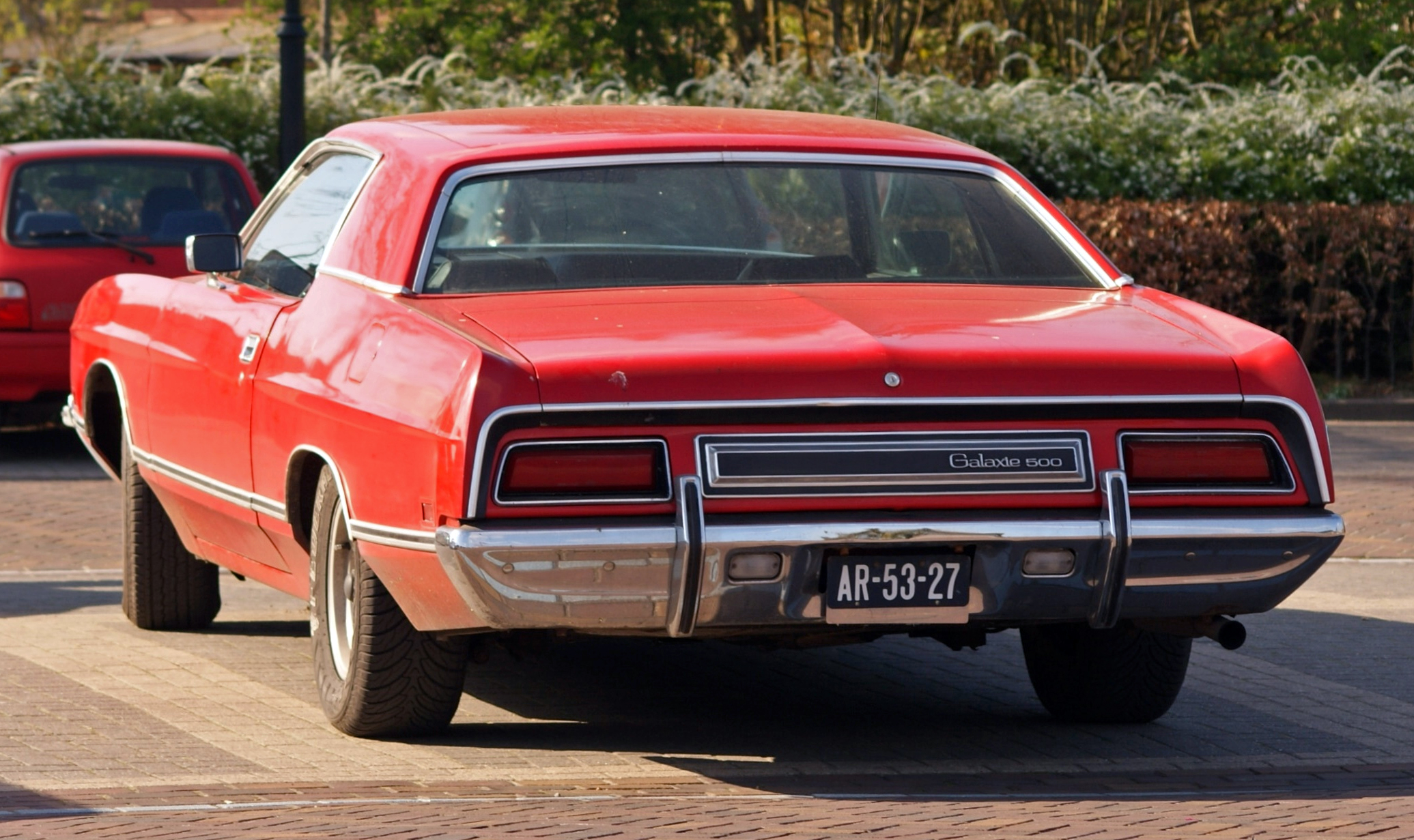
1971 Ford Galaxie 500 2-door Hardtop, rear view

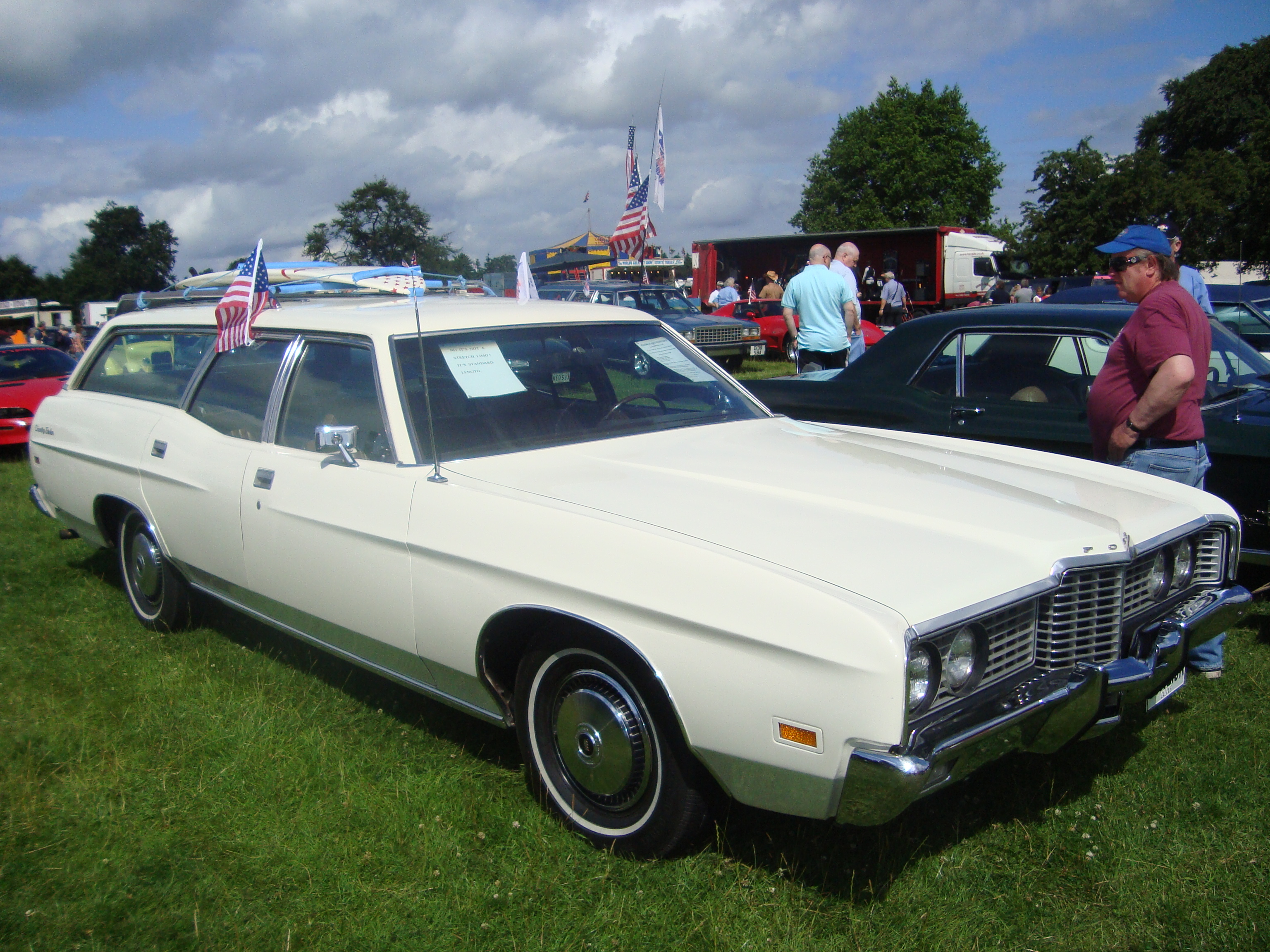
1972 Ford Galaxie 500 Country Sedan Station Wagon

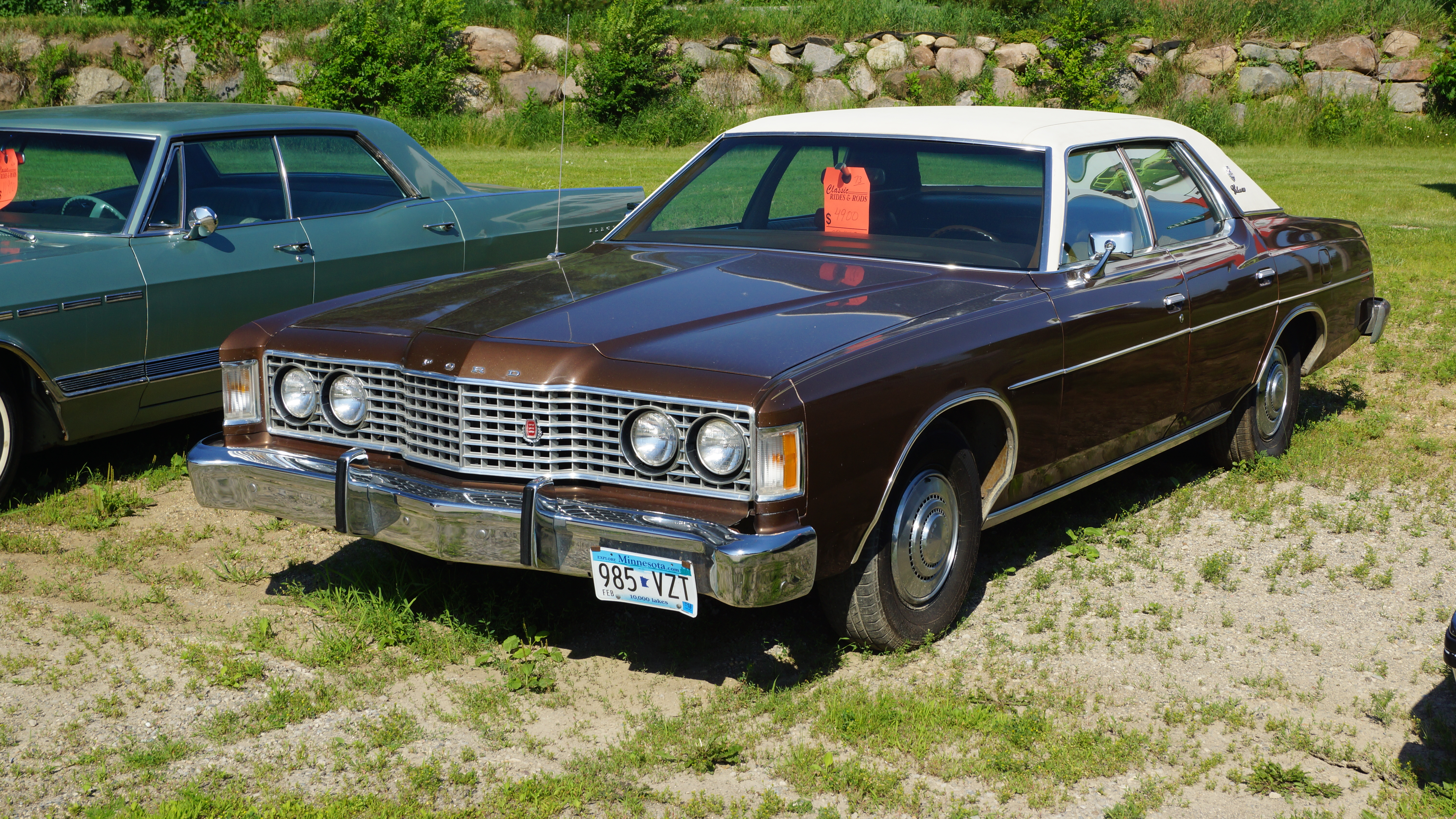
1973 Ford Galaxie 500 4-Door Pillared Hardtop

== Production statistics ==
Model year	Galaxie production	Total series production
1959	464,100	733,700
1960	289,268	461,092
1961	349,665	486,284
1962	446,195	575,846
1963	648,010	774,382
1964	593,533	923,232
1965	564,008	978,429
1966	597,002	1,034,930
1967	426,941	877,127
1968	448,376	920,247
1969	421,197	998,796
1970	351,938	850,315
1971	322,351	917,856
1972	269,199	832,273
1973	233,554	941,054
1974	117,801	519,916

Total Series Production includes Custom, Custom 500, Seven Litre, Station Wagon, LTD, and all Galaxie models. Galaxie Production includes Galaxie, Galaxie 500, Galaxie 500XL, XL, and Galaxie 500 LTD when LTD was not a separate model (until 1966).

== Australian production ==
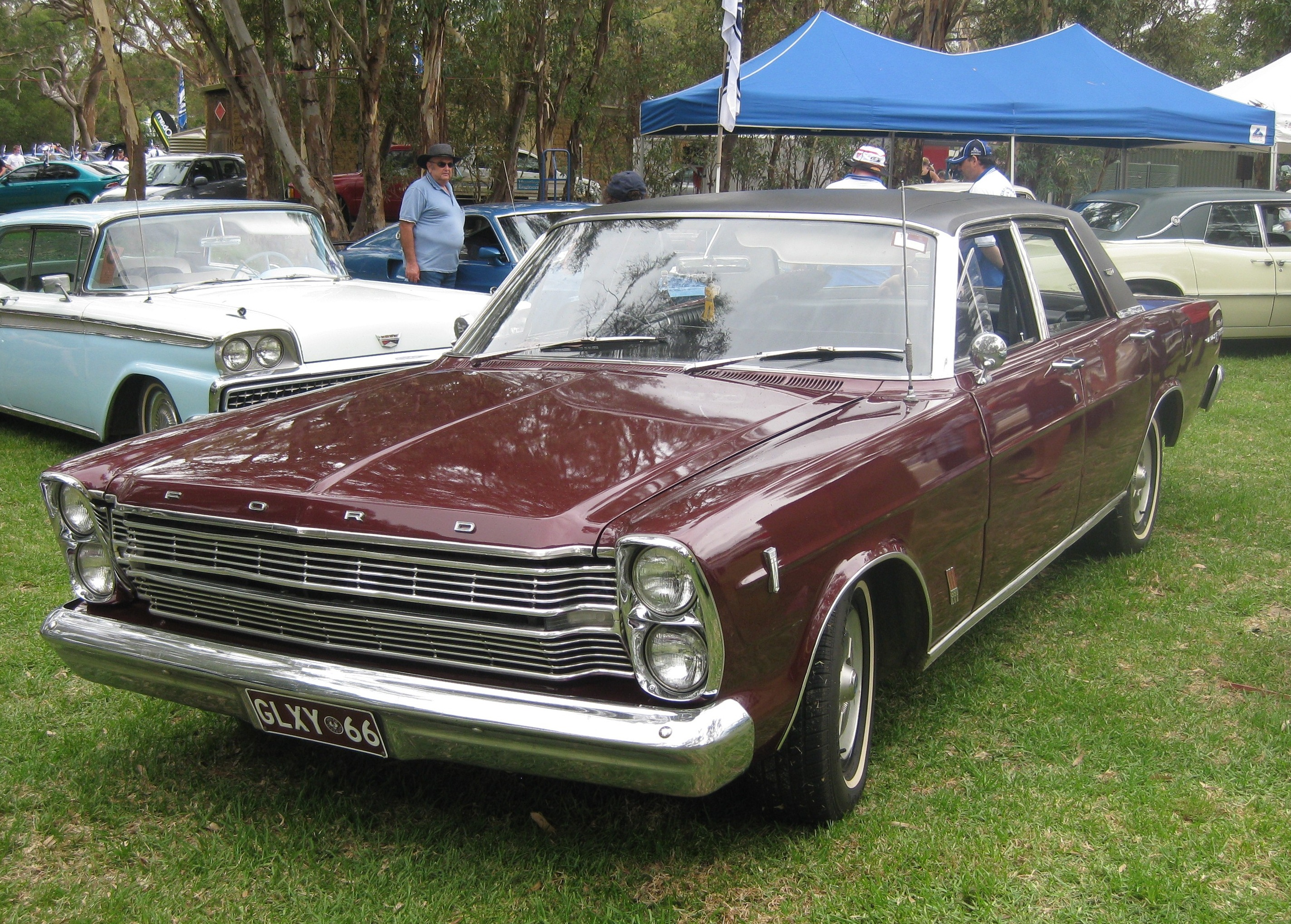
1966 Australian Ford Galaxie 500

The Ford Galaxie was also produced in Australia from late 1964 to 1968. The 1965 model, which was designated as the Galaxie GE series by Ford Australia, was assembled at Ford's Homebush West plant in Sydney, and was offered as a 4-door sedan with a choice of 289 cu in (4.7 L) or 390 cu in (6.4 L) cid V8 engines. 1966, 1967 and 1968 models were also assembled at Homebush prior to a change to full importation from 1969, with conversion from left to right hand drive being undertaken at Ford's Broadmeadows facility in Melbourne. The 1969 model was marketed as the Galaxie LTD, as were subsequent models through to the introduction of the locally developed Ford LTD in 1973.

Prior to local assembly which began in late 1964, small numbers of RHD full imports were sourced through select Australian Ford dealers, and also by Ford of Australia for executive use. RHD wagons, convertibles and fastbacks, 2- and 4-door hardtops, XLs and LTDs were generally sourced as full imports from Ford of Canada until approx 1968. The fully imported 1959 to early 1963 models used a 1959 U.S. Fairlane dashboard and instruments. In late 1963, a 1959 Edsel Corsair-based dashboard was used, and for 1964, a 1959 Edsel Ranger-based dashboard was used. However, some RHD 1963s and 1964s have been photographed with the more attractive U.S.-style 1964 cluster. Australian assembled 1965–1968 models were sourced in CKD form from Ford of Canada. The 1965–1967 model Galaxies adopted the RHD dashboard based on the 1963 Lincoln Continental. The 1967 models got the U.S.-market safety steering wheel with its thickly padded center hub. This wheel was retained for 1968, and the 1968 Torino cluster replaced the Continental version. Some right hand drive 1967 models have been seen with a mirror image of the US-style instrument panel for that year.

Australian assembled cars 1965–1968 received a woodgrain dashboard fascia, and accessories as standard, such as:

- Power steering
- Power brakes (front disc from 1967)
- Radio with 390 engine
- Automatic transmission
- Wipers and washers (single speed intermittent wipers for 1965–1966, 2-speed from 1967)
- 3-speed heater defroster

For the 1968 model year the 289 CID engine was dropped as the base option in favor of the new 302 CID (Windsor) V8.

Australian assembly of 1965 to 1968 model Galaxies from CKD kits totalled 3,124 vehicles with 1,766 of the 1969 to 1972 models converted to right-hand-drive in Australia.

== Brazilian production ==
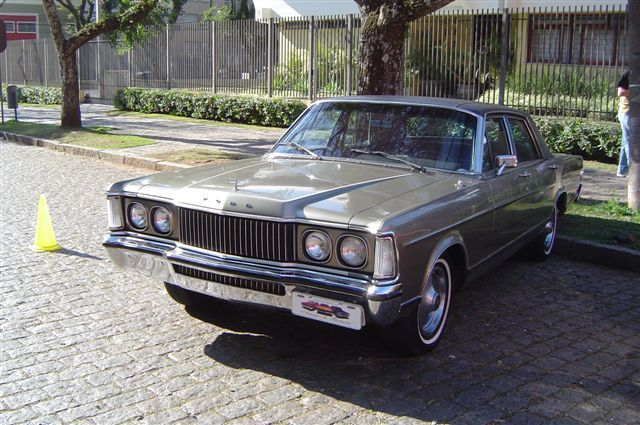
1982 Ford Landau (a luxury Brazilian version of the Galaxie)

The 1966 four-door sedan version of the Galaxie was also produced in Brazil under the names Galaxie, Galaxie 500, LTD and Landau from 1967 to 1983. Two units were used as the presidential car until 1990. Some of these ran neat ethanol (E100), and had 28 gallon fuel tanks.

The Brazilian production started in 1967, and finished in 1983. The 4 door sedan was the only body version available for that market.

The 1967 Brazilian Ford Galaxie was visually identical to its 1966 American counterpart. For that year model the only available engine was the 272 cu in (4.5 L) Y-block v8, with a two barrel carburettor.

During the production, the 1967 body (or 1966 for the American market) remained - and received face-lifts through the years.

The main face-lift was in 1976, when the headlights became horizontally oriented, and the front end resembled the 1965 Lincoln Continental. Also from 1976, the 302 cu in (4.9 L) V8 Windsor engine with a two barrel carburettor replaced the Y-block and became the only available option until the end of the Brazilian production in 1983.

== Canadian variant ==
Starting in 1959, Ford of Canada produced a slightly retrimmed version of the Galaxie, marketed as the Meteor Montcalm. The Montcalm was virtually identical to the Galaxie except for minor side trim and revised grille and taillight inserts. Starting in 1965, the Montcalm used the Galaxie platform but featured Mercury styling. It was offered at Canadian Mercury dealerships until 1969.

== See also ==
- List of Ford vehicles
