= Mercury S-55 =

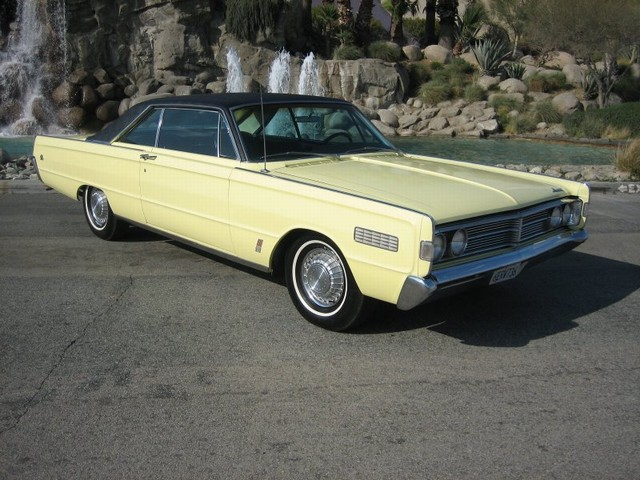
- 1966 Mercury S-55 2-Door Hardtop

Overview
- Manufacturer: Mercury (Ford)
- Production: 1962–1963; 1966–1967
- Assembly: Main plant Wayne, Michigan (Branch assembly); Metuchen, New Jersey; Pico Rivera, California; Hazelwood, Missouri

Body and chassis
- Class: Full-size
- Layout: FR layout
- Related: Ford Galaxie; Mercury Monterey

The Mercury S-55 is a car that was marketed by Mercury from the 1962 to 1963 model years and again from 1966 to 1967. The full-size version of the Mercury "S" (Special) range, the S-55 was a performance-oriented variant of the Mercury Monterey, serving as a divisional counterpart of the Ford Galaxie 500XL. Offered only as a two-door hardtop and convertible, the S-55 was marketed as an alternative to the Chrysler 300 "letter series".

At the end of the 1960s, the form factor for high-performance vehicles shifted away from full-size sedans, with model lines such as the S-55 falling out of favor as buyers shifted towards personal luxury coupes and muscle cars. Following the 1967 model year, Mercury discontinued the S-55, largely replacing it with the Mercury Marauder, which was produced through 1970.

== Mercury S (Special) Series ==
Ford Motor Company introduced performance-oriented trim packages for its Ford and Mercury divisions for the 1963 model year. Mercury featured the S (Special) line of sub-models. While the smaller S-22 Comet and S-33 Meteor consisted primarily of exterior trim, badging, bucket seats, and floor-mounted shifters, the full-size S-55 offered the upgraded interior features along with a higher-performance powertrain.

== First generation (1962–1963) ==
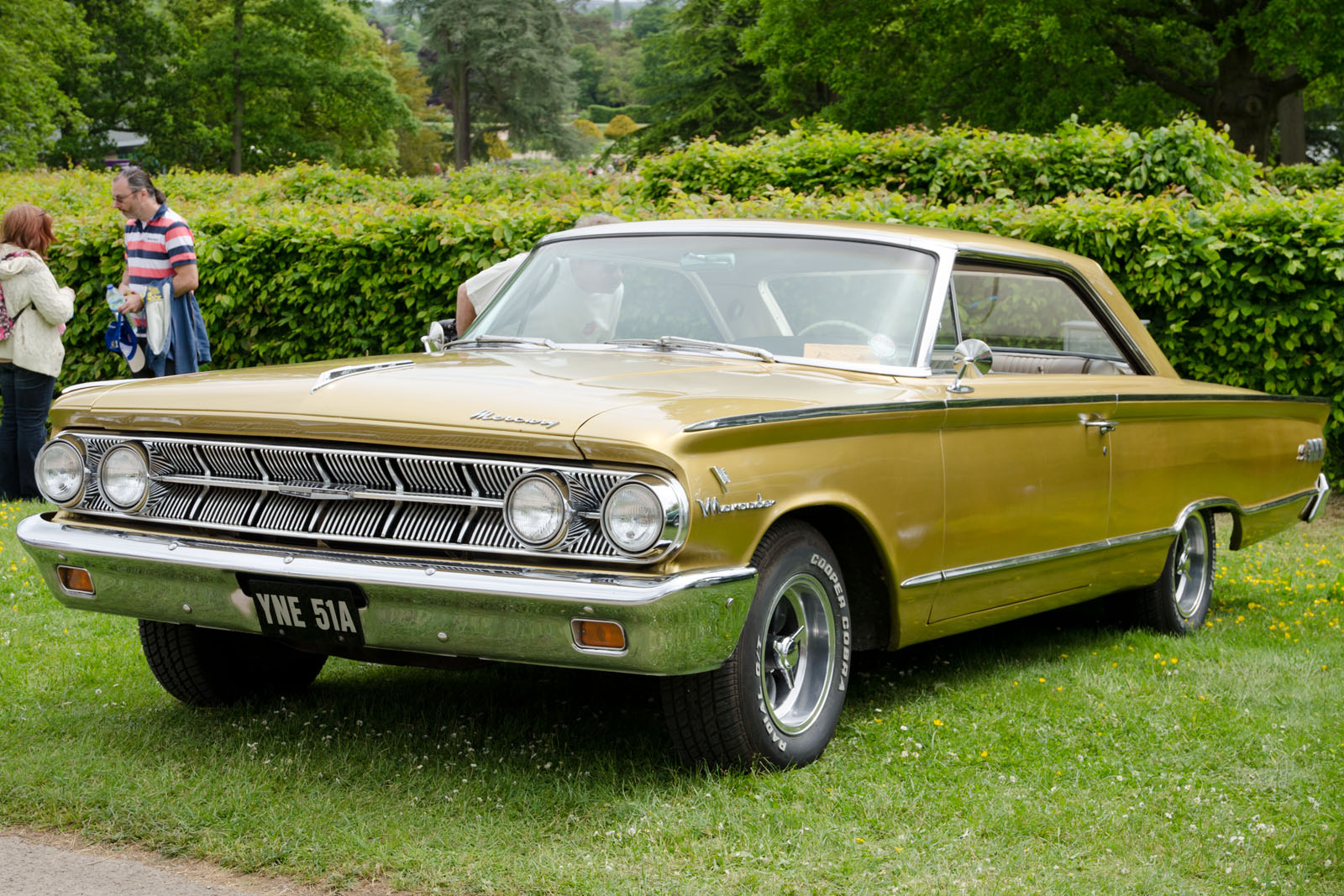
1963 Mercury Monterey S-55 Marauder two-door (aftermarket wheels)

The 1962 Mercury S-55 was introduced alongside the Mercury Monterey. As with the Ford Galaxie 500XL, the S-55 was available in two-door hardtop and convertible body styles. As a performance-oriented variant, the S-55 had bucket seats, a center console, a floor-mounted shifter, and special wheel covers.

The S-55 was powered by the two largest V8s available in the Monterey, a 390 cu in (6.4 L) engine rated at 300 or 330 hp (224 or 246 kW), or a 406 cu in (6.7 L) version that was rated at 385 or 405 hp (287 or 302 kW). The triple-carbureted version of the 406 was a special-order engine that achieved over 95 mph (153 km/h) in quarter-mile dragstrip tests by Road & Track. The hardtop was listed at US$3,488 ($37,125 in 2025 dollars) and 2,772 were sold.

For 1963, the S-55 model line was expanded to include four-door hardtops. The previous notchback roofline was discontinued and replaced with the "Breezeway" design. This featured a reverse-slant retractable rear window. The "Marauder", a semi-fastback hardtop version, was continued. As in other Ford vehicles, the 406 V8 was replaced for 1963 by a 427 cu in (7.0 L) engine rated at 410 or 405 hp (306 or 302 kW). A special-order version producing 425 hp (317 kW) was intended for racing use.

Mercury discontinued the S-series line after 1963. Performance-oriented versions were available in 1964 with the 390 and 427 V8 engines and a Marauder fastback roofline. Bucket seats and console interior trim were extra-cost options known as the "Sports Package" for the luxury-oriented "Park Lane" two-door and four-door Marauder models.

== Second generation (1966–1967) ==
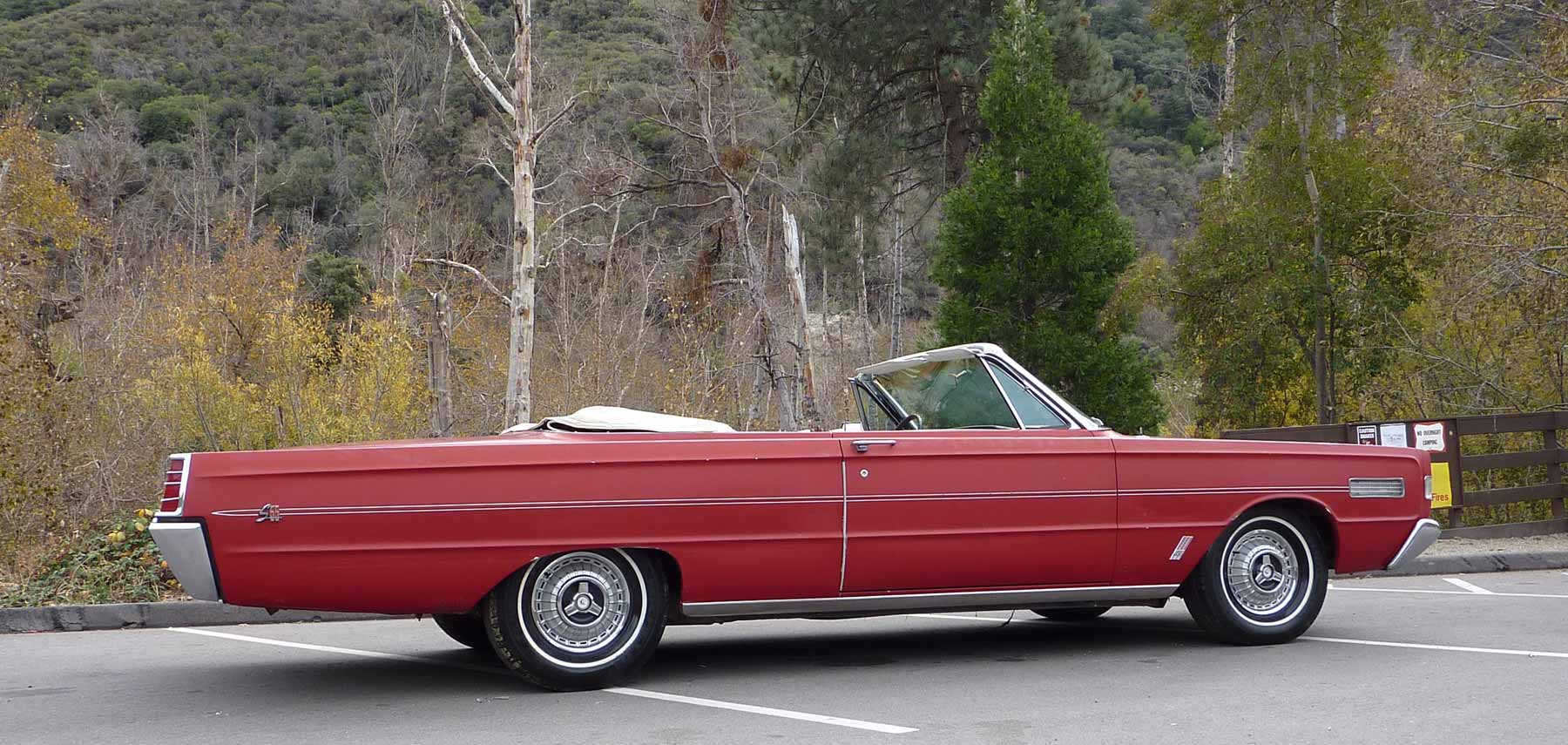
1966 Mercury S-55 Convertible

For the 1966 model year, the S-55 made its return as a stand-alone model (becoming the only S model to make a return). As in 1962, the model lineup consisted solely of two-door hardtops and convertibles. Again based on the Monterey, the S-55 featured a bucket-seat interior with a floor-mounted shifter and a higher-performance powertrain. Styling accents include unique body side-striping, deluxe wheel covers and the distinctive S-55 emblem on rear quarter panel and 428 V-8 emblem on the front fender sides. As with the previous generation the retail price and number of hardtops made was similar at US$3,292 ($32,667 in 2025 dollars) with 2,916 sold.

In place of the 390 and 427 V8 engines, the 1966 S-55 was powered by a single engine. A 345 hp ''Super Marauder'' 428 cubic-inch V8 was paired to a 4-speed manual transmission or 3-speed ''Merc-O-Matic" automatic transmission. This was the same engine that powered the Ford Galaxie 500 7-Litre of the same year.

For 1967, poor sales of the S-55 demoted the model to become the "S-55 Sports Package". The Mercury full-size line saw a major exterior update, changing its flat-fendered sides to a more rounded shape. During the model year, the S-55 Sports Package would be dropped; the division would concentrate its two-door efforts on the smaller Mercury Cougar and more luxurious Mercury Marquis. In various forms, the Cougar and Marquis would become the two most successful nameplates ever sold by the Mercury brand.

== S-55 Data Sheet / Statistics ==
Year	Car Line and Series Name	Body Style	Body Style Code	Price	Production Numbers	Engine Choices
1962	Monterey S-55	2-door Hardtop	65C	$3,488	2,772	390-CID V-8 (4V) (300 or 330
1962	Monterey S-55	2-door Convertible	76B	$3,738	1,315	horsepower); 406 V-8 (4V or 3-2V)
1963	Monterey S-55	2-door Hardtop with Breezeway Design	65C	$3,650	3,863	390-CID V-8 (4V)(300 or
1963	Monterey S-55	2-door Marauder Hardtop	63C	$3,650	2,317	330 horsepower); 406-CID
1963	Monterey S-55	4-door Hardtop with Breezeway Design	75C	$3,715	1,203	V-8 (4V or 3-2V);
1963	Monterey S-55	2-door Convertible	76B	$3,900	1,379	427 CID V-8 (4V)(2-4V)
1966	S-55	2-door Hardtop (Fastback)	63G	$3,292	2,916	428-CID V-8 (4V)(345HP)
1966	S-55	2-door Convertible	76G	$3,614	669	428(4V) 345 HP
1967	S-55	2-door Hardtop (Fastback)	63G	$3,511	570	428-CID V-8 (4V)
1967	S-55	2-door Convertible	76G	$3,837	145	428-CID V-8 (4V)
