= Mercury Meteor =

American car

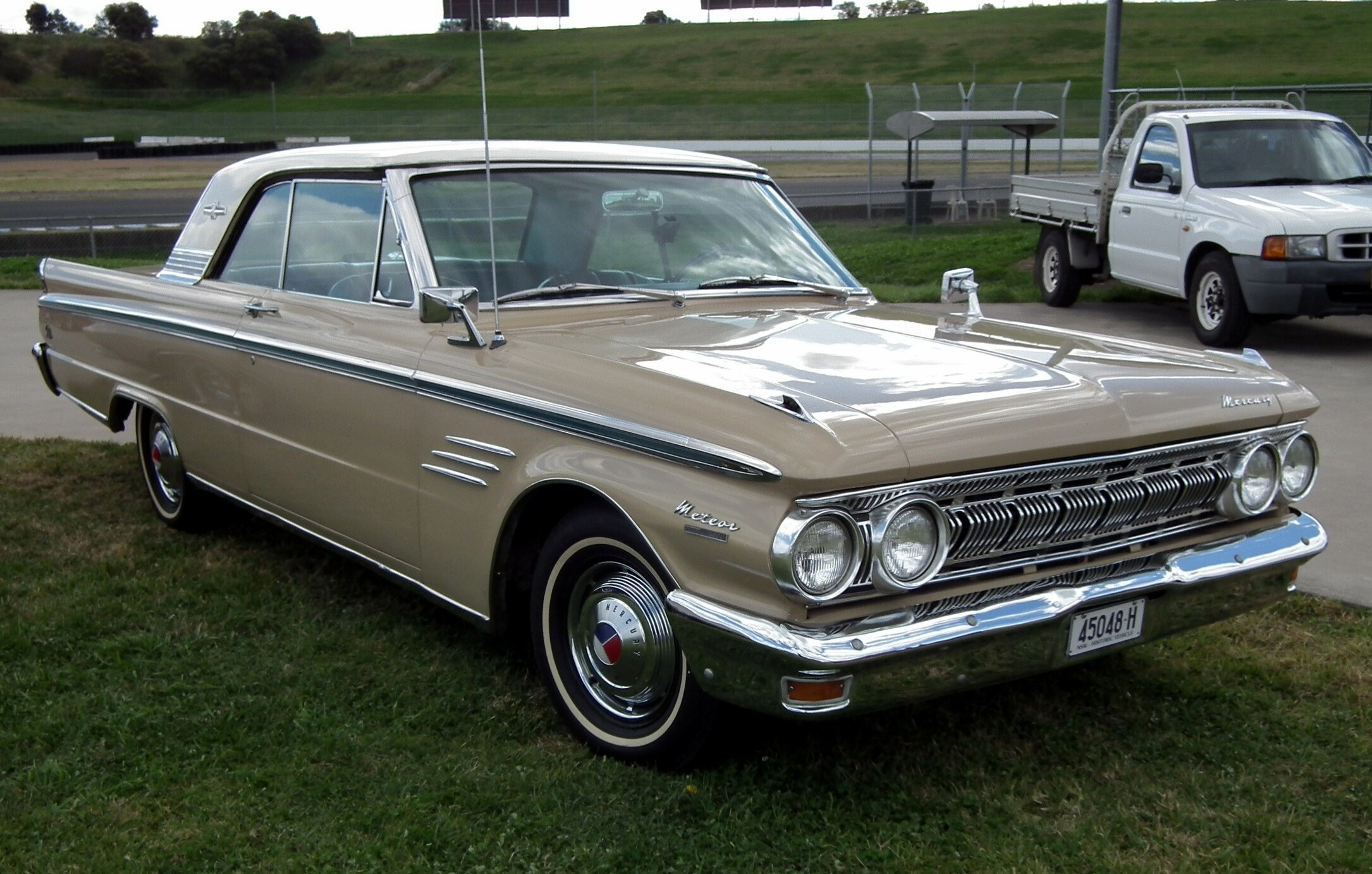
- 1963 Mercury Meteor Custom Two-Door Hardtop

Overview
- Manufacturer: Mercury (Ford)
- Production: 1961–1963

Body and chassis
- Class: Full-Size (1961); Mid-size (1962–1963)
- Body style: 2-door hardtop 2-door sedan 4-door sedan 4-door hardtop 5-door station wagon
- Layout: FR layout
- Related: Ford Fairlane

The Mercury Meteor is an automobile that was produced by Mercury from the 1961 to 1963 model years. Adopting its nameplate from the namesake Ford of Canada brand, the Meteor was introduced as the base-trim full-size Mercury sedan, while the compact Mercury Comet shared a naming convention associated with the ongoing Space Race of the early 1960s. Slotted below the Mercury Monterey, the Meteor was the Mercury counterpart of the Ford Fairlane.

For 1962, as part of a revision of the Mercury range, the nameplate was adopted by the first intermediate-size Mercury sedan (with the Meteor again serving as a counterpart of the Fairlane). Following the 1963 model year, Mercury withdrew the model range. While the Meteor would become one of the shortest-lived Mercury nameplates, its role within the division would be revived for 1966 as the Mercury Comet grew into the intermediate segment (later becoming the Montego).

== Meteor (Ford of Canada brand) ==
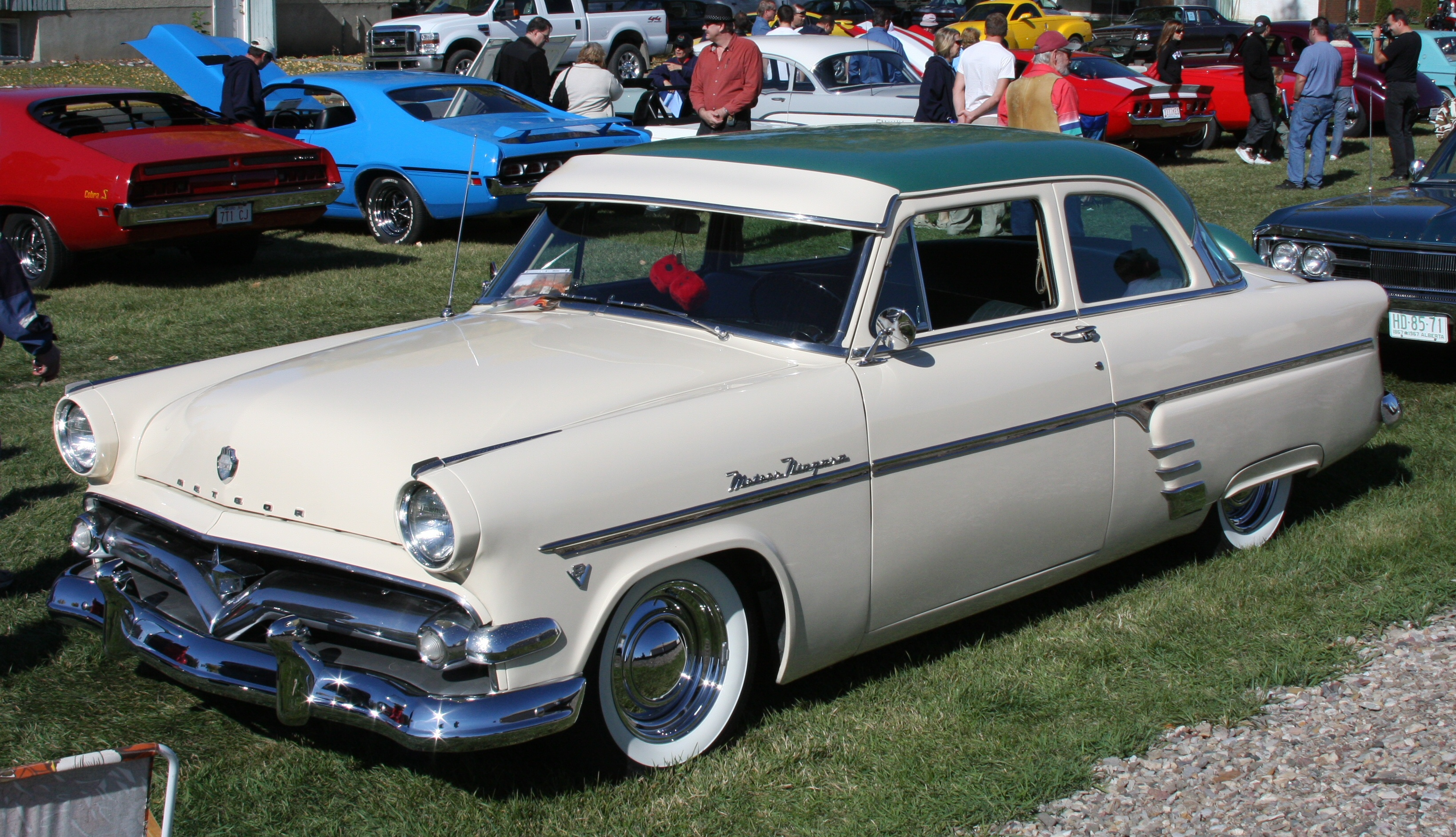
1954 Meteor Niagara

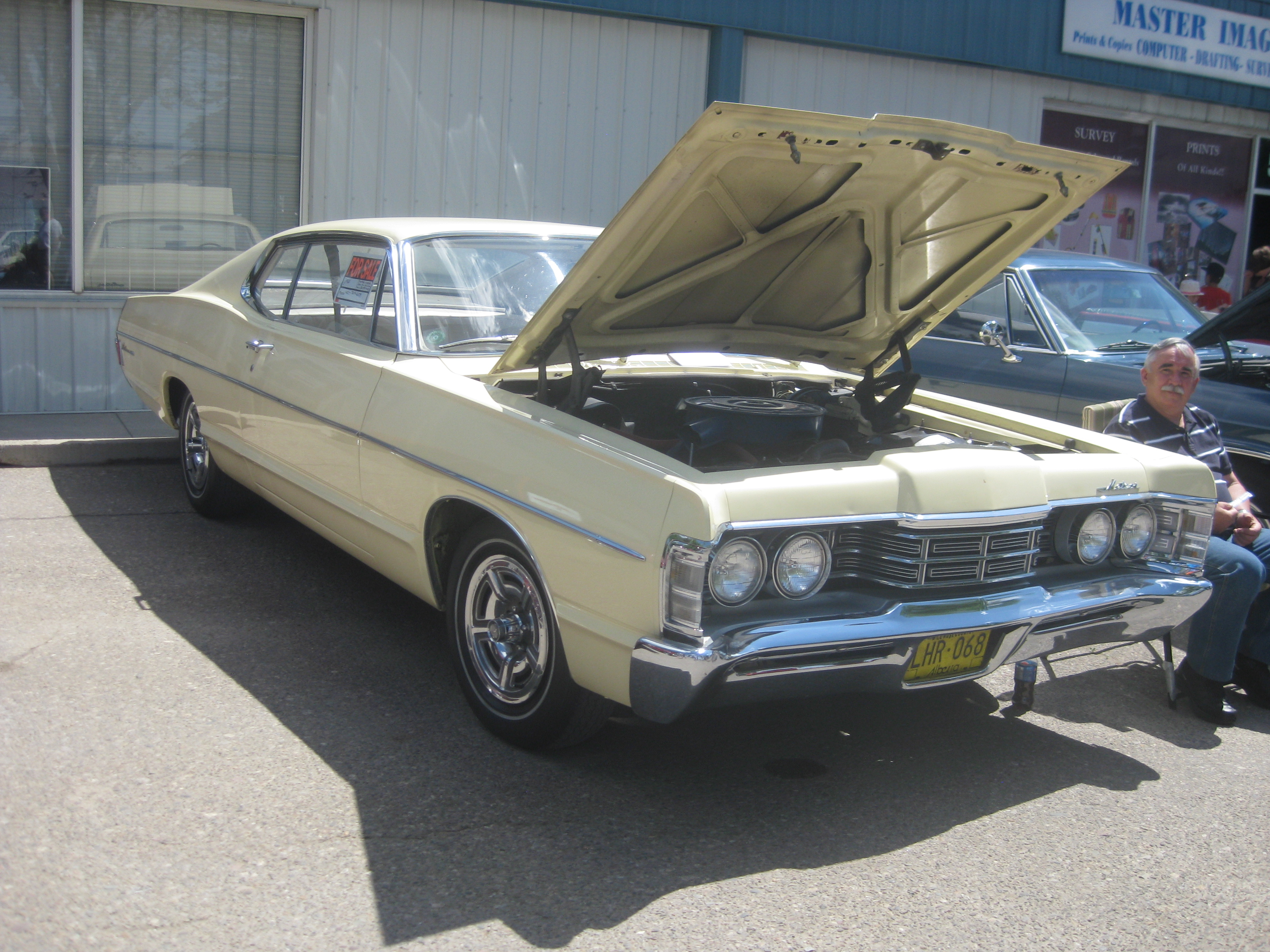
1968 Meteor Rideau 500 two-door hardtop. Although this car bears close resemblance to the U.S. market Monterey, it is actually based on the Ford Galaxie 500.

The Meteor name first came into use through Ford of Canada on a regional line of cars it introduced in 1949. To give Canadian Lincoln-Mercury dealerships a car line slotted below the Mercury (to compete against Pontiac), the Meteor was a Ford body with its own grille, taillamps, and marginal upgrades to exterior and interior trim. The brand followed the similar 1946 introduction of the Monarch, a Mercury-based car sold by Ford (to compete against Oldsmobile). Ford of Canada introduced both marques as its dealership network contrasted with that of the United States; smaller communities in Canada were located close to either a Ford or a Lincoln-Mercury dealer, but not necessarily both.

After 1961, the Meteor brand was discontinued by Ford Canada, coinciding with the failure of Edsel and the remarketing of the Mercury brand (see below), who adopted the name for its base full-size car line derived from the Ford Fairlane.

For 1964, the Mercury Meteor was dropped, with Ford Canada reviving the brand. Introduced as a Mercury-bodied car with a Ford dashboard, from 1965 onward, the Meteor line shared its body with the Ford Galaxie, adding Mercury exterior trim.

After 1968, the Meteor brand was phased into the Mercury line in Canada, with the stand-alone Mercury Meteor discontinued after 1976. From 1977 to 1981, the Meteor name lived on in Canada as the base-trim version of the Marquis (as a counterpart to the final-generation Ford Custom 500).

== Background ==
In the mid-1950s, Ford executives were convinced by Ernest Breech that in order to compete with General Motors the automaker had to meet each sales segment with a unique product. Alongside the creation of the Edsel, the plan affected Mercury by giving the brand a distinct chassis and body for 1957 (model differentiation not seen since 1940).

Historically, Mercury was typically considered a "lower-medium-priced" car brand (competing against Pontiac and Dodge). Under the Breech plan, Mercury was to move upmarket (competing against Buick, Oldsmobile, Chrysler, and DeSoto), with the Edsel adopting the lower-medium-price role previously served by Mercury. While Breech’s plan could have succeeded in the early 1950s, by the end of the decade, the medium-price car market was severely affected by the 1958 recession; sales of the Edsel brand fell far under sales projections.

Although more established than Edsel, the Mercury brand still saw significant sales declines (with 1957 sales higher than 1958 and 1959 combined). In response, Ford President Robert S. McNamara had recommended the elimination of Lincoln, Mercury, and Edsel, leaving Ford as its namesake brand. In a compromise, although Edsel was withdrawn early during the 1960 model year, Mercury and Lincoln were given a reprieve. For 1961, Lincoln was consolidated to a single Lincoln Continental line, with Mercury returning to its previous market position (vacated by Edsel), returning solely to the Monterey sedan and Commuter/Colony Park station wagon.

To build a better business case for Mercury, the division again was developed as a longer-wheelbase version of the Ford bodyshell and chassis, largely differentiated by trim elements. As part of the cancellation of Edsel, the Mercury line saw further revision. To recoup the engineering and development costs of the 1961 Edsel product line, the vehicles entered production as part of the Mercury line. Intended as the redesigned 1961 full-size Edsel, the Mercury Meteor was joined by the Comet (not branded as a Mercury Comet until 1962), which served as a divisional counterpart of the compact Ford Falcon.

== Full-size (1961) ==
First generation
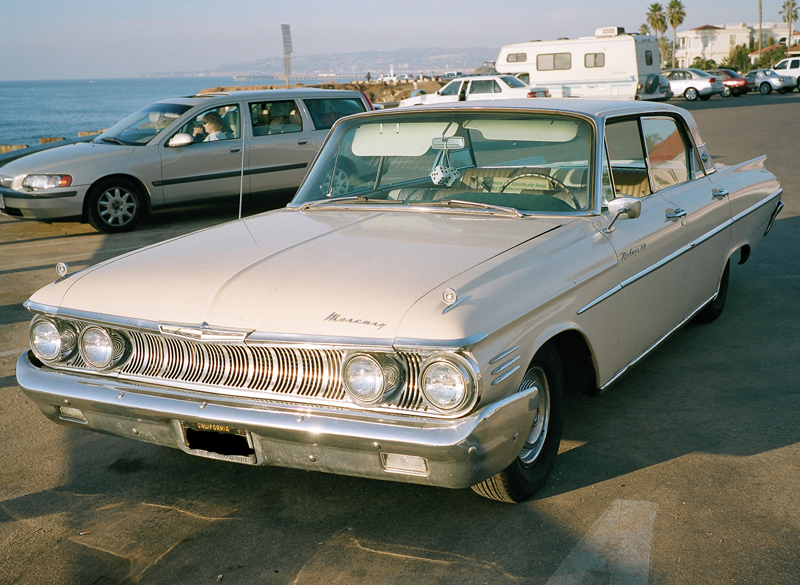
- 1961 Meteor 800 4-door hardtop

Overview
- Production: 1960–1961
- Assembly: Wayne, Michigan; Pico Rivera, California; Metuchen, New Jersey; St. Louis, Missouri

Body and chassis
- Body style: 2-door sedan 2-door hardtop 4-door hardtop 4-door sedan
- Related: Ford Fairlane; Ford Galaxie; Mercury Monterey; Mercury Commuter

Powertrain
- Engine: 223 cu in (3.7 L) Mileage Maker I6; 292 cu in (4.8 L) Y-block V8; 352 cu in (5.8 L) FE V8; 390 cu in (6.4 L) FE V8
- Transmission: 2-speed Merc-O-Matic automatic 3-speed Multi-Drive Merc-O-Matic automatic 3-speed manual

Dimensions
- Wheelbase: 3,048 mm (120 in)
- Length: 214.6 in (5,450 mm)
- Width: 79.9 in (2,030 mm)
- Height: 55.0 in (1,400 mm)

Chronology
- Predecessor: Edsel Ranger
- Successor: Mercury Monterey

For 1961, Mercury shifted from its own body and chassis to a variant of the 1960 Ford bodyshell, downsizing from a 126 inch wheelbase to 120 inches. Originally developed as the 1961 Edsel Ranger, the Meteor was slotted below the Monterey within the Mercury line; the higher-priced Montclair and Park Lane nameplates were retired. The Meteor was now the corporate counterpart to the demoted Ford Fairlane when the all-new Ford Galaxie took the top billing in the Ford product line. The Fairlane, which was also offered as the Fairlane 500 as a higher content alternative, was very similar in price to the Meteor but sold much better while the Meteor offered a hardtop roofline as both a two-door and four-door while the Fairlane and Fairlane 500 didn't.

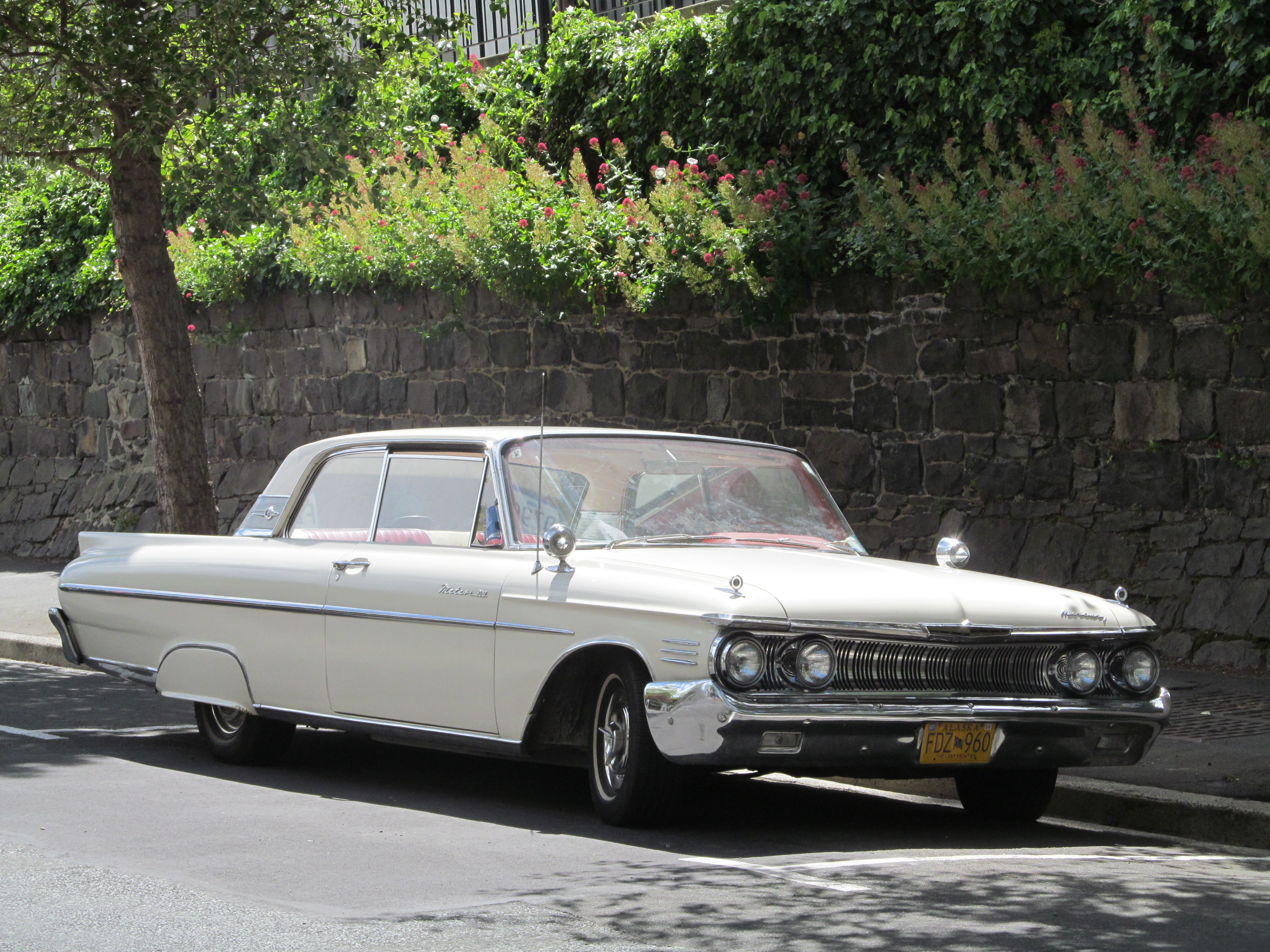
1961 Meteor 800 2-door hardtop

Optional and "convenience features" continued to grow from past years, and items that were extra cost included air conditioning, passenger compartment heater, electric clock, interior courtesy light group, exterior backup lights, windshield defroster, padded instrument panel, power assist brakes, four-way adjustable power front seat, power steering, pre-selected pushbutton AM radio, tinted glass, two-speed windshield wipers, windshield washer, and two-tone exterior paint choices. Some vehicles were pre-ordered with optional equipment by dealerships and then sold new, listing the optional equipment on the window sticker or could be specially requested by the customer. The Meteor 600 two-door sedan was more popular than the four-door sedan and was listed at US$2,533 ($27,290 in 2025 dollars) and sold 18,117, while the Meteor 800 two-door sedan was also the most popular at US$2,711 ($29,208 in 2025 dollars) with 35,005 manufactured.

The Meteor was offered as the 600 series and 800 series in four body styles, including two door and four-door pillared sedans and two-door and four-door hardtops with the same wheelbase and exterior dimensions. The lower-priced Meteor 600 was offered only as a sedan and was distinguished by two oblong taillamps. The Meteor 800 was offered in all four body styles and was given additional chrome trim; the rear fascia used six round taillamps (shared with the Monterey). While the Meteor was not offered as a station wagon, the Mercury Commuter was trimmed as its equivalent, with the wood-trim Colony Park serving as the counterpart of the Monterey.

=== Powertrain details ===
In a first for a full-size Mercury, the Meteor was not fitted with a V8 engine as standard equipment. Instead, a 223 cubic-inch inline-six was fitted, producing 135hp. Four V8 engines were offered as options, including a 175hp 292 cubic-inch V8 (the standard engine for the Monterey/Colony Park), a 220hp 352 cubic-inch "Marauder" V8, and a 390 cubic-inch V8 producing either 300hp or 330hp. A three-speed manual was offered as standard equipment, with overdrive as an option; 3-speed "Merc-O-Matic" and "Multi-Drive" automatic transmissions were available as options.

== Intermediate (1962–1963) ==
Second generation
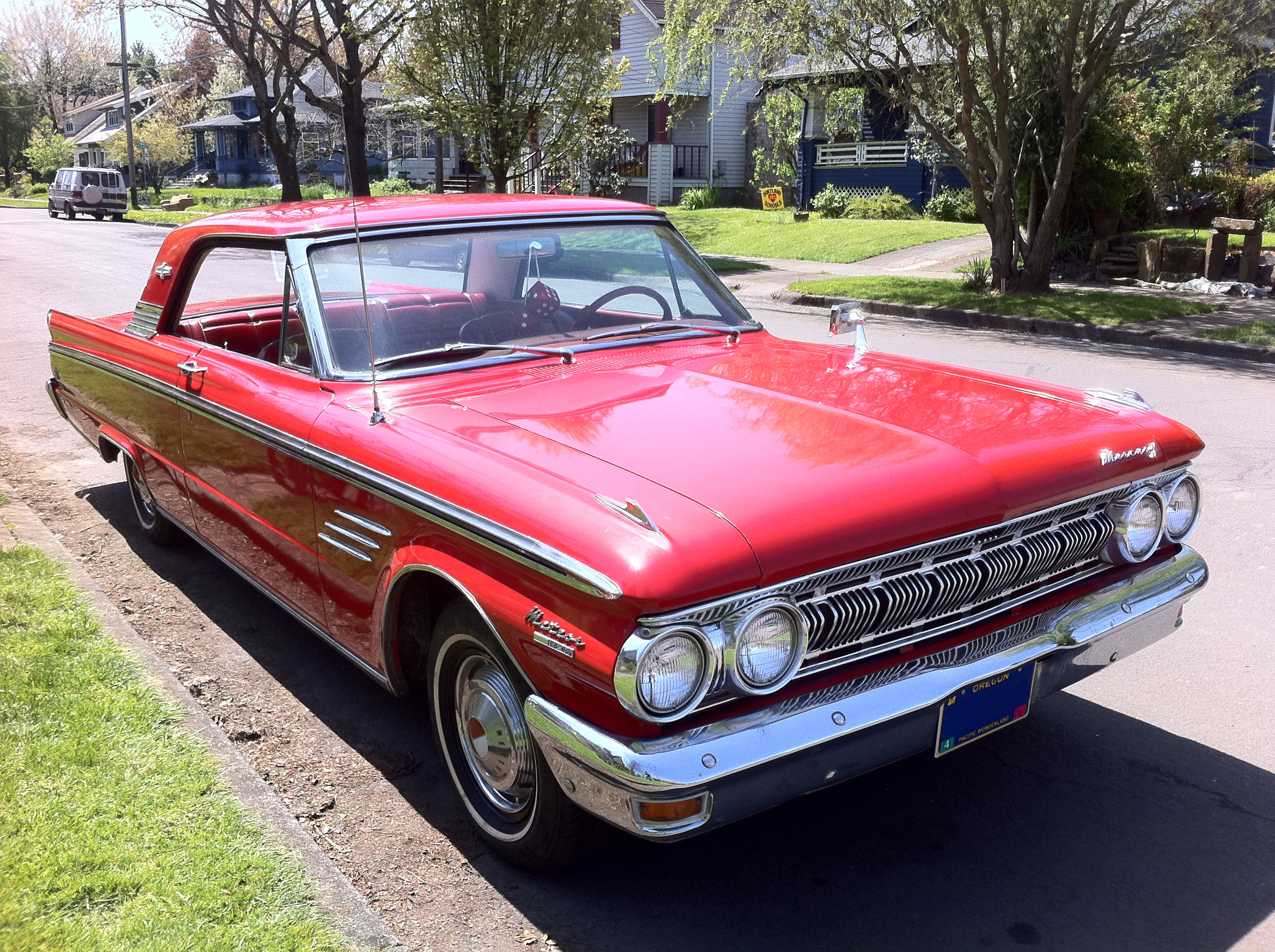
- 1963 Mercury Meteor S-33 2-door hardtop in Carnival Red

Overview
- Production: 1962–1963
- Assembly: Dearborn, Michigan; Kansas City, Missouri; Milpitas, California

Body and chassis
- Body style: 2-door sedan 2-door hardtop 4-door sedan 5-door station wagon
- Related: Ford Fairlane

Powertrain
- Engine: 170 cu in (2.8 L) Thriftpower I6; 221 cu in (3.6 L) Windsor V8; 260 cu in (4.3 L) Windsor V8
- Transmission: 2-speed automatic 3-speed automatic 3-speed manual 4-speed manual

Dimensions
- Wheelbase: 2,934 mm (115.5 in)
- Length: 197.6 in (5,019 mm)
- Width: 71.3 in (1,811 mm)
- Curb weight: 2,930–2,970 lb (1,329–1,347 kg)

Chronology
- Successor: Mercury Comet (1966)

For 1962, Lincoln-Mercury again consolidated the full-size Mercury line, adopting the Meteor nameplate to a newly-created intermediate-size car (the forerunner of mid-size cars of today), bridging the size gap between the Mercury Monterey and the Mercury Comet. Again a divisional counterpart of the Ford Fairlane, the Meteor used a 115.5 inch wheelbase.

For 1962, the Meteor was offered as a two-door and four-door sedan. To downplay the appearance of tailfins, the rear fascia was styled with "jet-pod" taillights. Alongside the standard Meteor and higher-trim Meteor Custom, the Meteor S-33 was a trim package for two-door sedans, featuring premium exterior trim and interior amenities including bucket seats and a center console (serving as the Mercury counterpart of the Fairlane 500 Sports Coupe).

For 1963, alongside minor trim revisions, the Meteor received the addition of a four-door station wagon and a two-door hardtop coupe. The station wagon was offered in both trims; Meteor Custom wagons were branded as the Mercury Country Cruiser, with simulated woodgrain exterior trim. The hardtop was offered as a Meteor Custom and Meteor S-33; the latter was no longer offered as a two-door sedan.

Sales of the mid-sized Mercury Meteor were less than expected and the model was discontinued at the end of the 1963 model year.

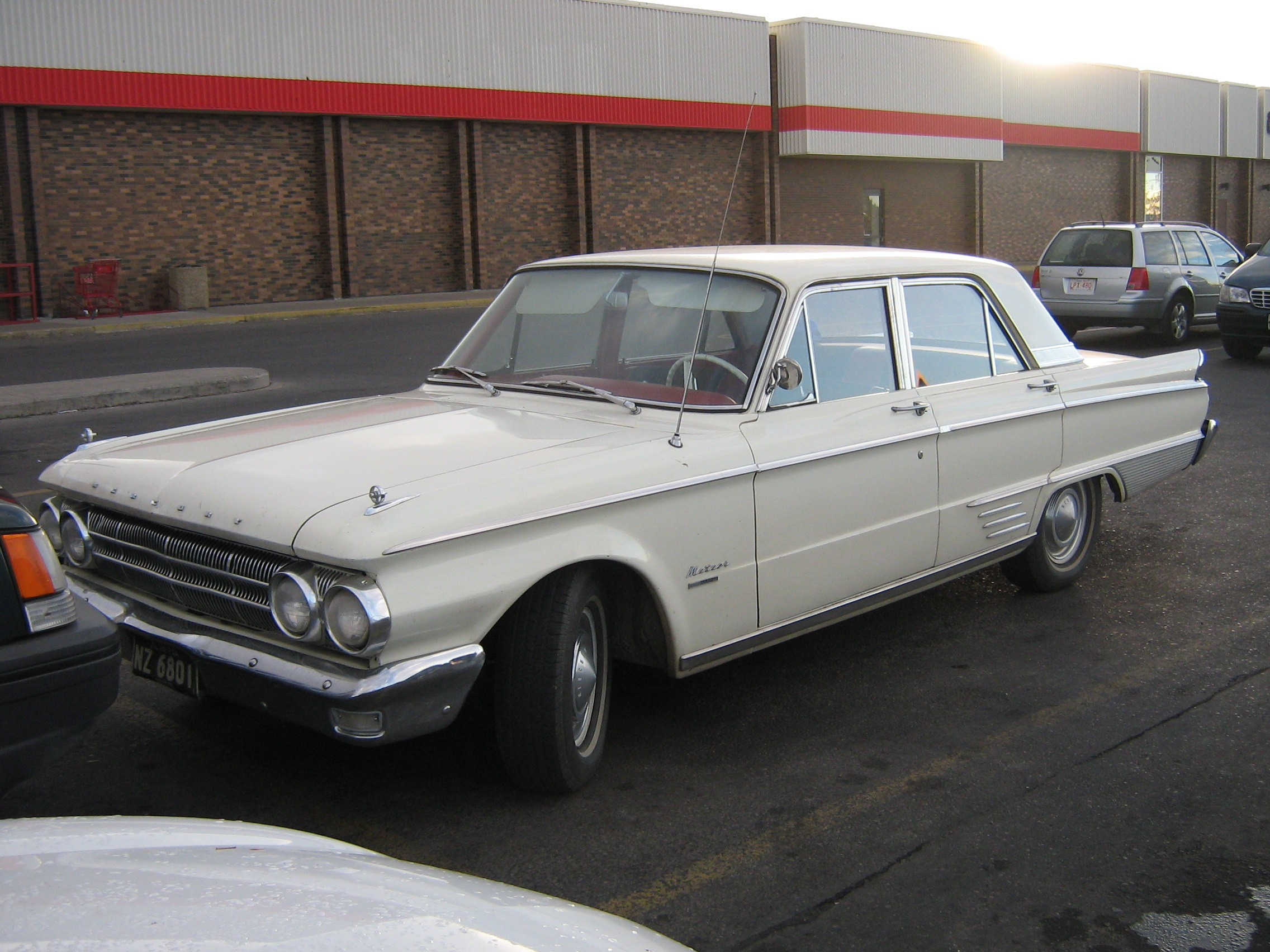
1962 Mercury Meteor Custom Four-Door Sedan

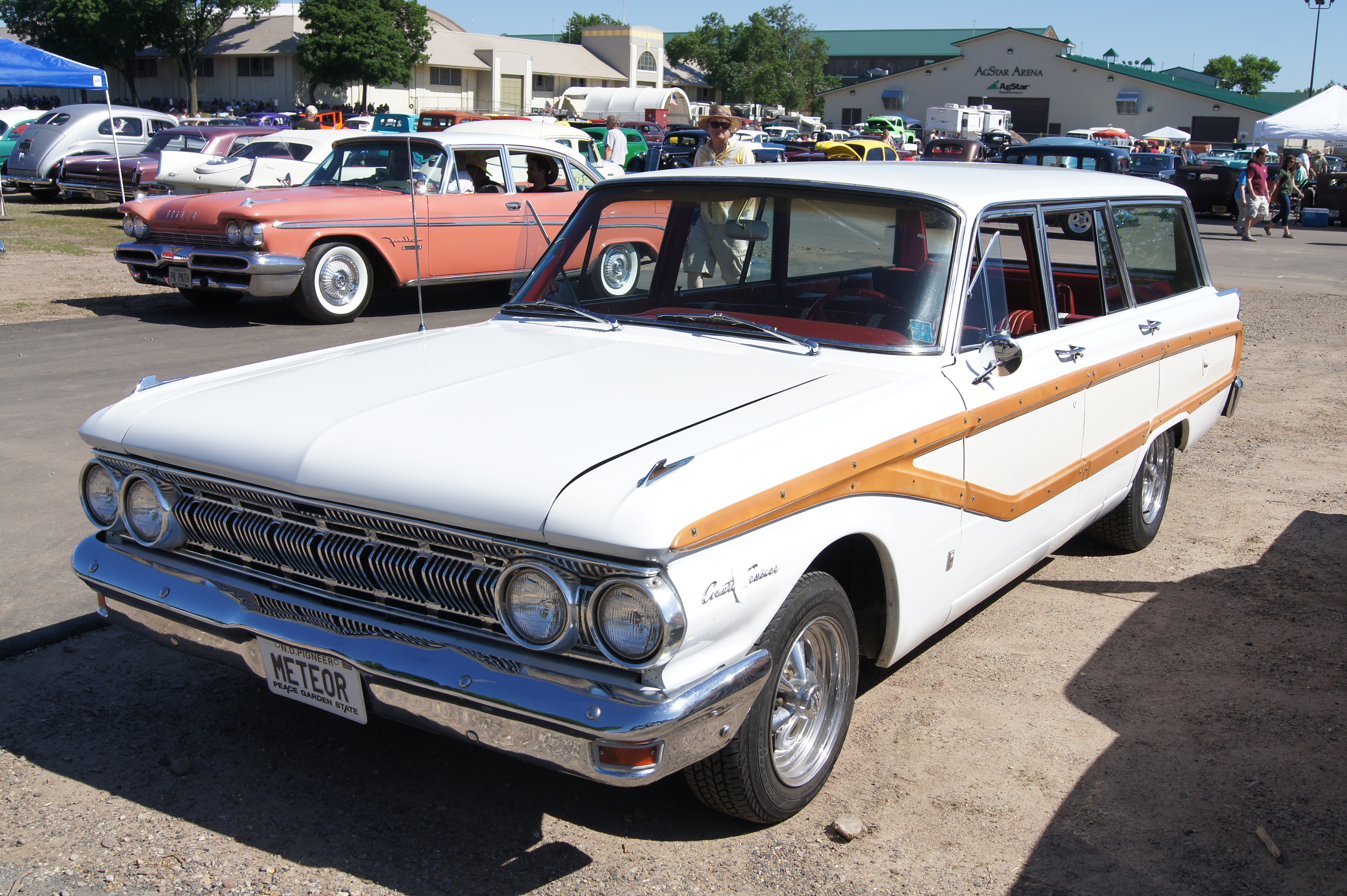
1963 Mercury Meteor Country Cruiser station wagon

=== Powertrain details ===
The standard engine for the 1962–1963 Meteor was a 170 cubic-inch inline-six, producing 101hp. Two V8 engines were offered as options, including a 145hp 221 cubic-inch V8 and a 164hp 260 cubic-inch V8. A three-speed manual transmission was standard, with an overdrive manual transmission offered as an option; a "Merc-O-Matic" 3-speed automatic was offered as an option. For 1963, a four-speed manual transmission became an option.
