= Mercury Comet =

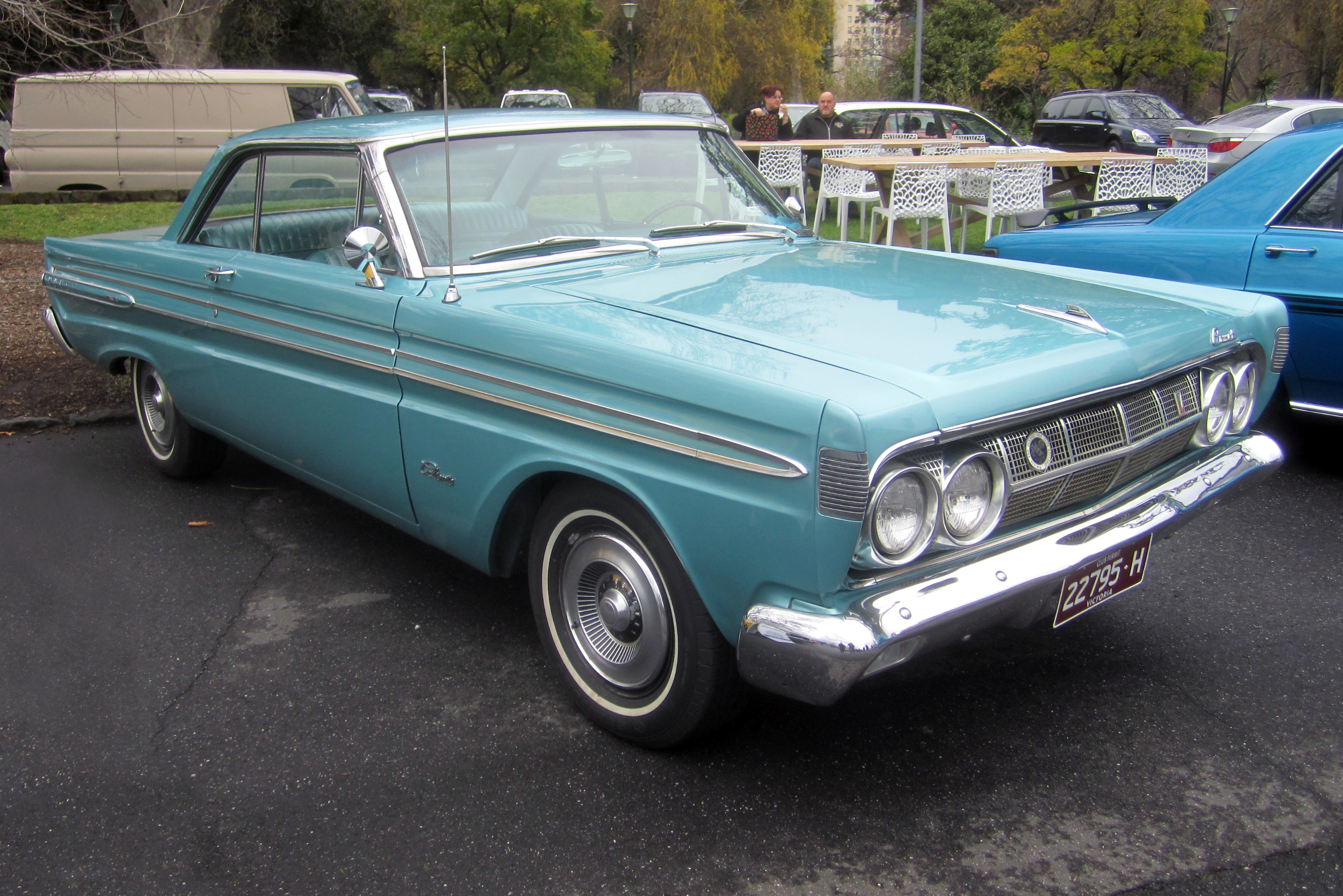
- 1964 Mercury Comet Caliente coupé

Overview
- Manufacturer: Mercury (Ford)
- Also called: Comet
- Production: 1960–1961 ("Comet"); 1962–1977 ("Mercury Comet")
- Assembly: Oakville, Ontario, Canada; Claycomo, Missouri, United States; Lorain, Ohio, United States; Milpitas, California, United States; Wayne, Michigan, United States

Body and chassis
- Class: compact (1960–1965, 1971–1977); Mid-size (1966–1969)
- Layout: FR layout
- Related: Ford Fairlane; Ford Falcon; Ford Maverick; Ford Torino; Mercury Montego

Chronology
- Successor: Mercury Zephyr; Mercury Monarch

The Mercury Comet is an automobile that was produced by Mercury from 1962–1969 and 1971–1977 — variously as either a compact or an intermediate car. For 1960 and 1961, Comet was its own brand sold by Lincoln-Mercury "Comet".

The compact Comet shared a naming convention associated with the ongoing Space Race of the early 1960s with the Mercury Meteor, which was introduced as the base-trim full-size Mercury sedan.

The Comet was initially based on the compact Ford Falcon, then on the intermediate Ford Fairlane, and finally on the compact Ford Maverick. Early Comets received better-grade interior trim than concurrent Falcons, and a slightly longer wheelbase.

== History ==
From 1960–1965, the Comet was based on the Ford Falcon platform (stretched 5 in (130 mm) for sedans, but not for wagons). The 1960–1963 Comets share a similar basic shape. These are sometimes referred to as the "round body" Comets. For 1962 and 1963, the Comet shared a considerable number of body and mechanical parts with the short-lived Fairlane-based Mercury Meteor intermediate.

The "Comet" name was trademarked to Cotner-Bevington as the Comet Coach Company, building ambulance and hearse commercial vehicles. Ford bought the name in 1959.

=== Relationship to Edsel ===
The Comet was originally meant to be the 1960 Edsel Comet before Edsel was shut down in November 1959. The model was shifted to the Lincoln-Mercury division and released on March 17th, 1960 in the United States and was sold through Lincoln-Mercury-Comet and Mercury-Comet dealerships. Door VIN tags read "Made in U.S.A. by Comet."

Developed concurrently with the Ford Falcon, early pre-production photographs of the sedan show a car remarkably close to the Comet that emerged, but with a split grille following the pattern established by Edsel models. Early Ford styling mules for the station wagon model carried the Edsel name, as well.

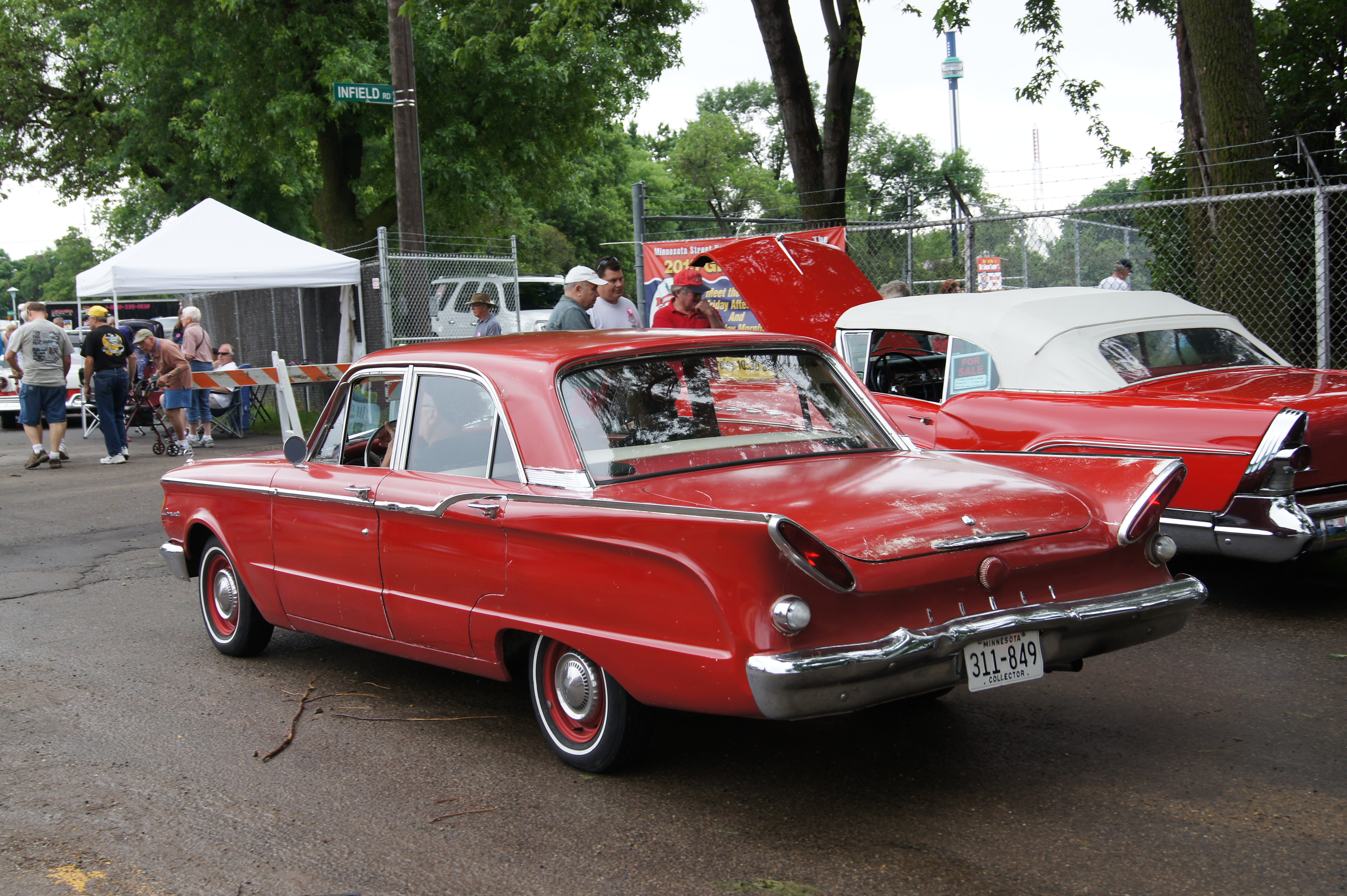
1960 Comet sedan with original lettering.

At their debut, the split grille was replaced by one more in keeping with Mercury's design themes, but the canted elliptical taillights, first seen on the Edsel prototype, were used and carried the "E" (Edsel) part number on them. While the short-lived 1960 Edsels used elliptical-shaped taillights, the lenses used on both cars differed in length and width. Certain other parts from the 1959 Edsel parts bin, including the parking lights and dashboard knobs, were used on the first-year Comet. Keys for the 1960 and 1961 Comets were shaped like Edsel keys, with the center bar of the "E" removed to form a "C".

== First generation (1960–1963) ==
First generation
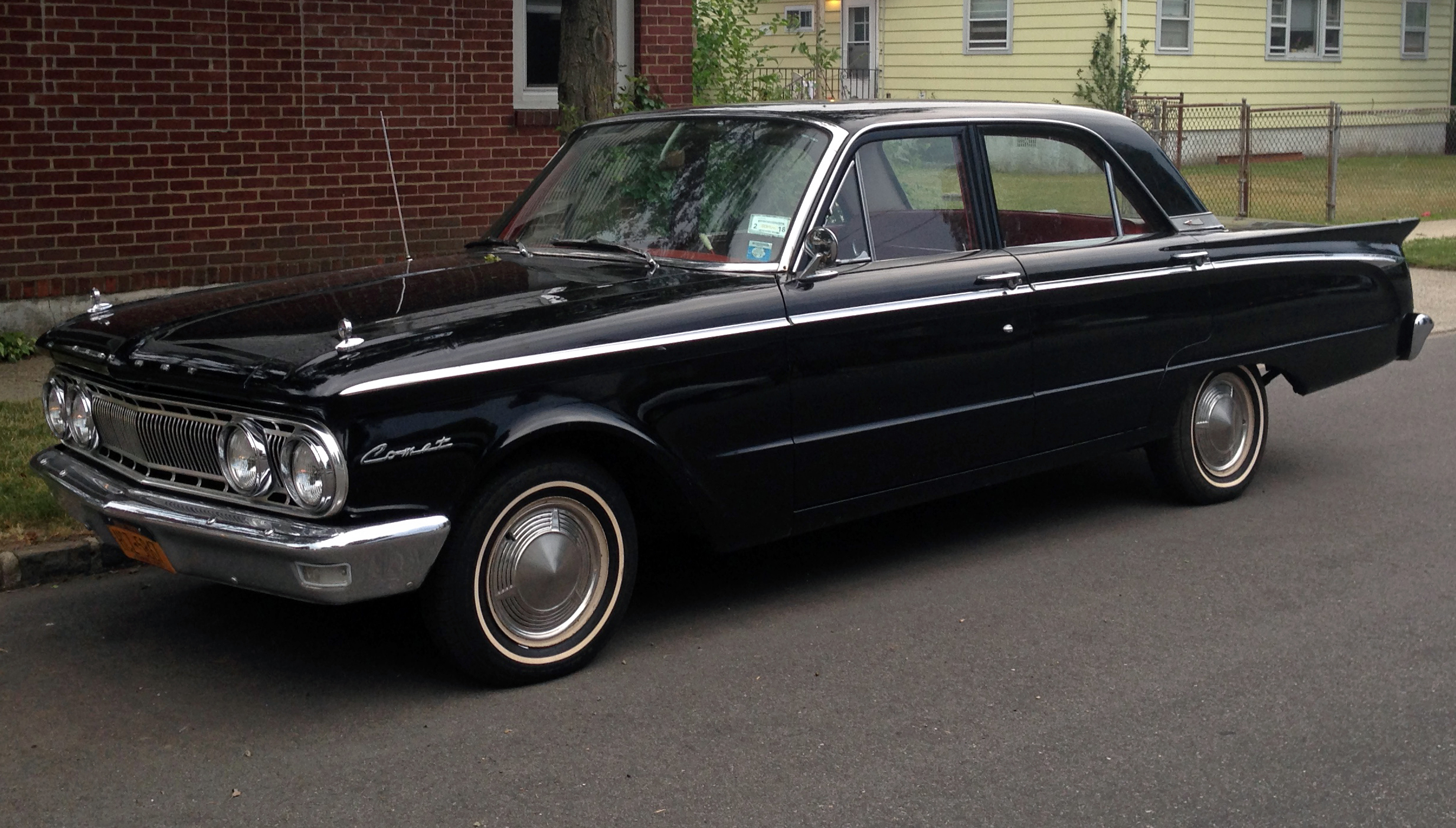
- 1962 Mercury Comet 4-door sedan

Overview
- Also called: Comet
- Production: 1960–1961 ("Comet"); 1962–1963 ("Mercury Comet")

Body and chassis
- Body style: 2-door hardtop 2-door sedan 4-door sedan 4-door station wagon 2-door station wagon 2-door convertible
- Related: Ford Falcon; Frontenac

Powertrain
- Engine: 144 cu in (2.4 L) Thriftpower I6; 170 cu in (2.8 L) Thriftpower I6; 260 cu in (4.3 L) Challenger V8
- Transmission: 3-speed manual 2-speed automatic 4-speed manual

Dimensions
- Wheelbase: 114 in (2,896 mm) (coupe, sedan); 109.5 in (2,781 mm) (wagon)
- Length: 194.5 in (4,940 mm)
- Width: 70.4 in (1,788 mm)
- Height: 54.5 in (1,384 mm)

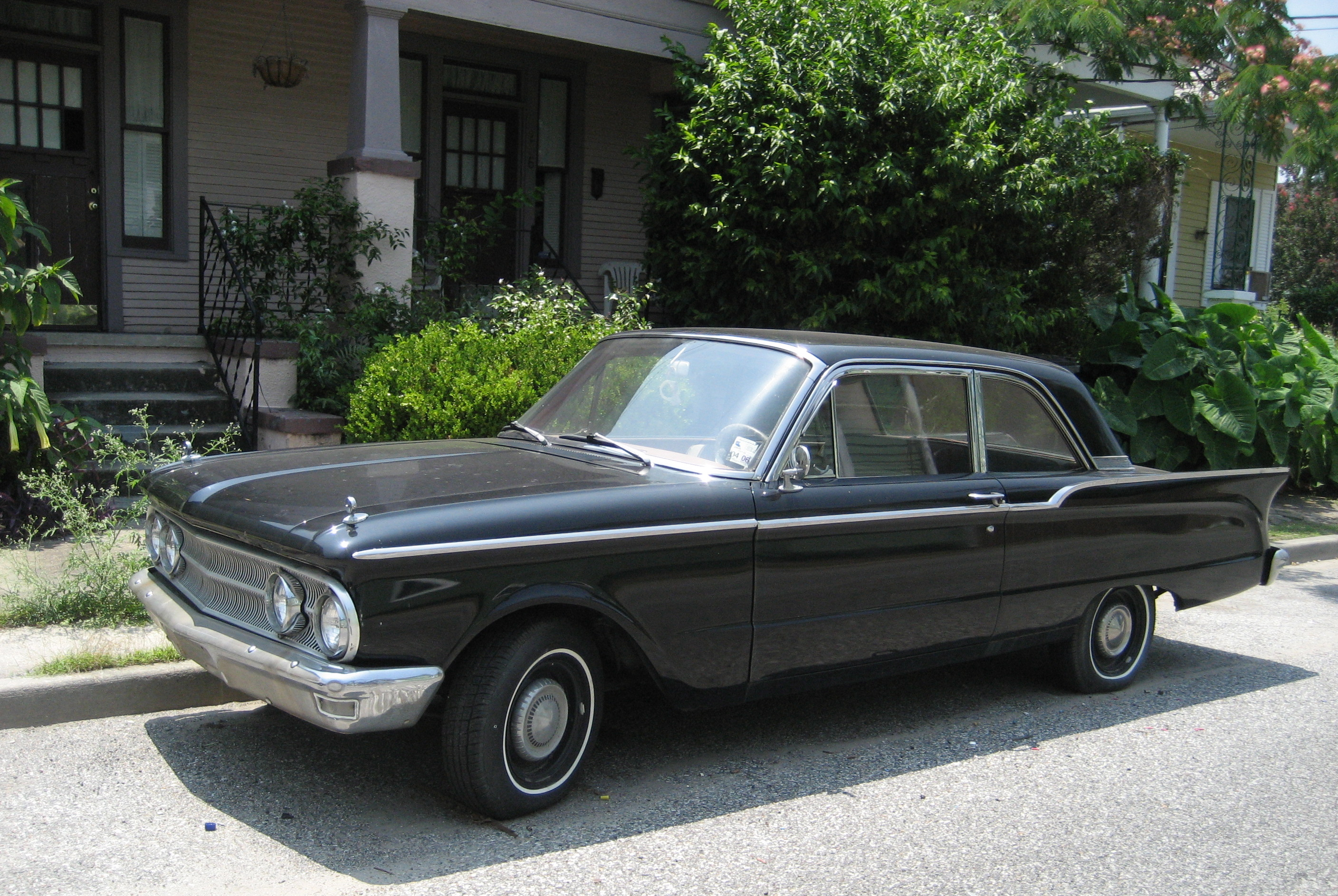
A 1960 Comet two-door sedan, with its very distinct tailfins

The Comet was initially released without any divisional badging, only "Comet" badges, similar to Valiant, which did not have Plymouth badging at first. It was sold through Lincoln-Mercury-Comet dealers, but was not branded as a Mercury Comet until the 1962 model year. This was similar to Ford's treatment of the Meteor and Frontenac of Canada, sold through Meteor-Mercury-Frontenac dealers.

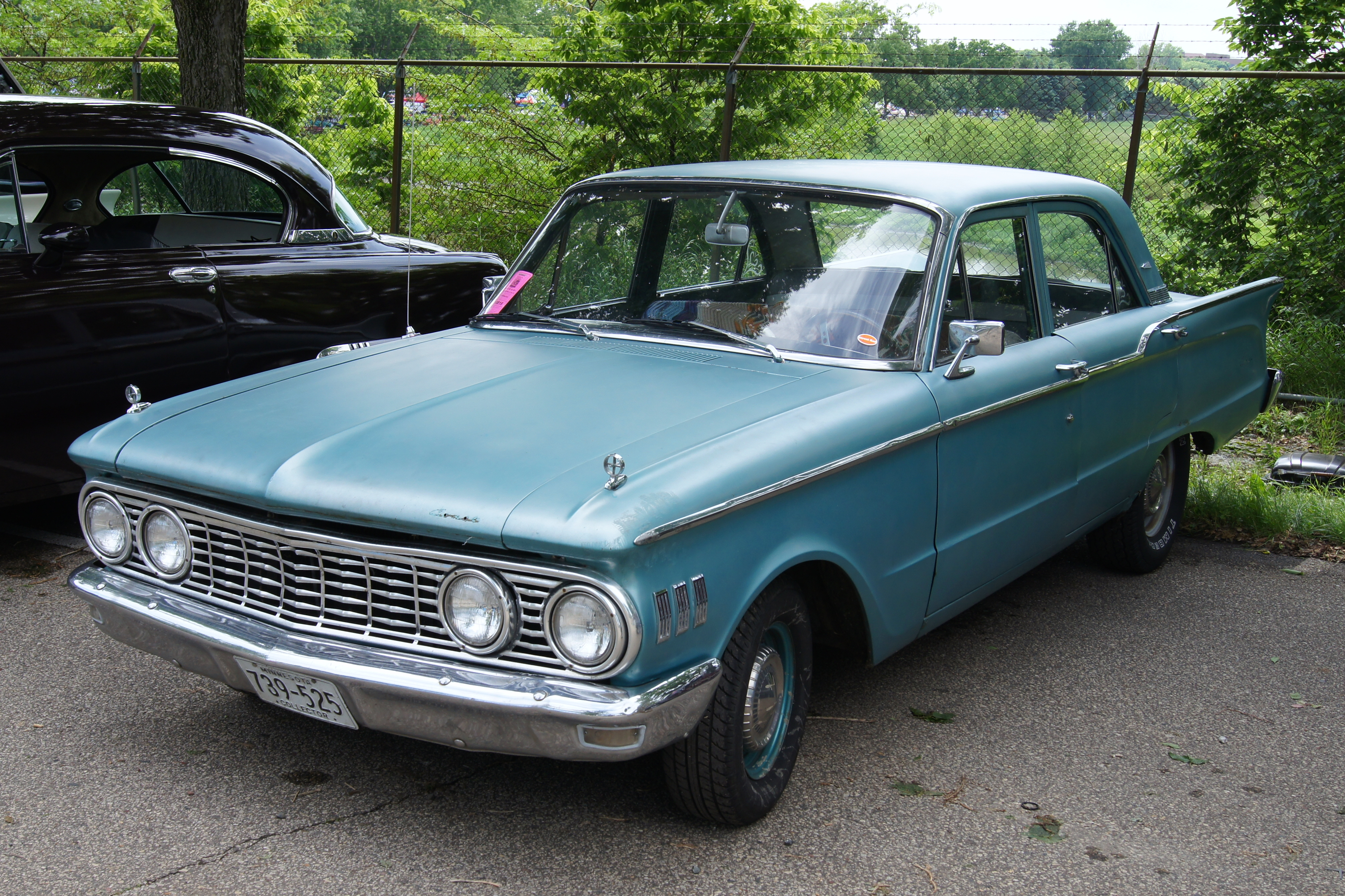
1961 Comet four-door sedan. A new grille design and the addition of three vertical chrome strips on the front fenders differentiates the 1961 Comet from its predecessor.

Introduced in March 1960, initial body styles were two- and four-door sedans and two- and four-door station wagons. Two trim levels were available, standard and "Custom", with the latter including badging, additional chrome trim, and all-vinyl interiors. In 1960, the only engine available was the 144 cid Thriftpower straight-six with a single-barrel Holley carburetor, which produced 90 hp (67 kW) at 4200 rpm. (Some sources list it as producing 85 hp (63 kW) at 4200 rpm.) Transmission options were a column-shifted three-speed manual and a two-speed Comet-Drive automatic transmission.

Ford had purchased the name "Comet" from Comet Coach Company, a professional car manufacturer in which the term belonged to a line of funeral coaches, mainly Oldsmobiles. The coach company then was renamed Cotner-Bevington.

In Canada, for the 1960 model year, Meteor-Mercury dealers sold a compact car called the "Frontenac". Considered a marque in its own right, it was a badge-engineered version of the Ford Falcon with only minor trim differences to distinguish it from the Falcon. The Frontenac was produced for only one year. The Comet was introduced to the Canadian market for the 1961 model year and replaced the Frontenac as the compact offering by Meteor-Mercury dealers.

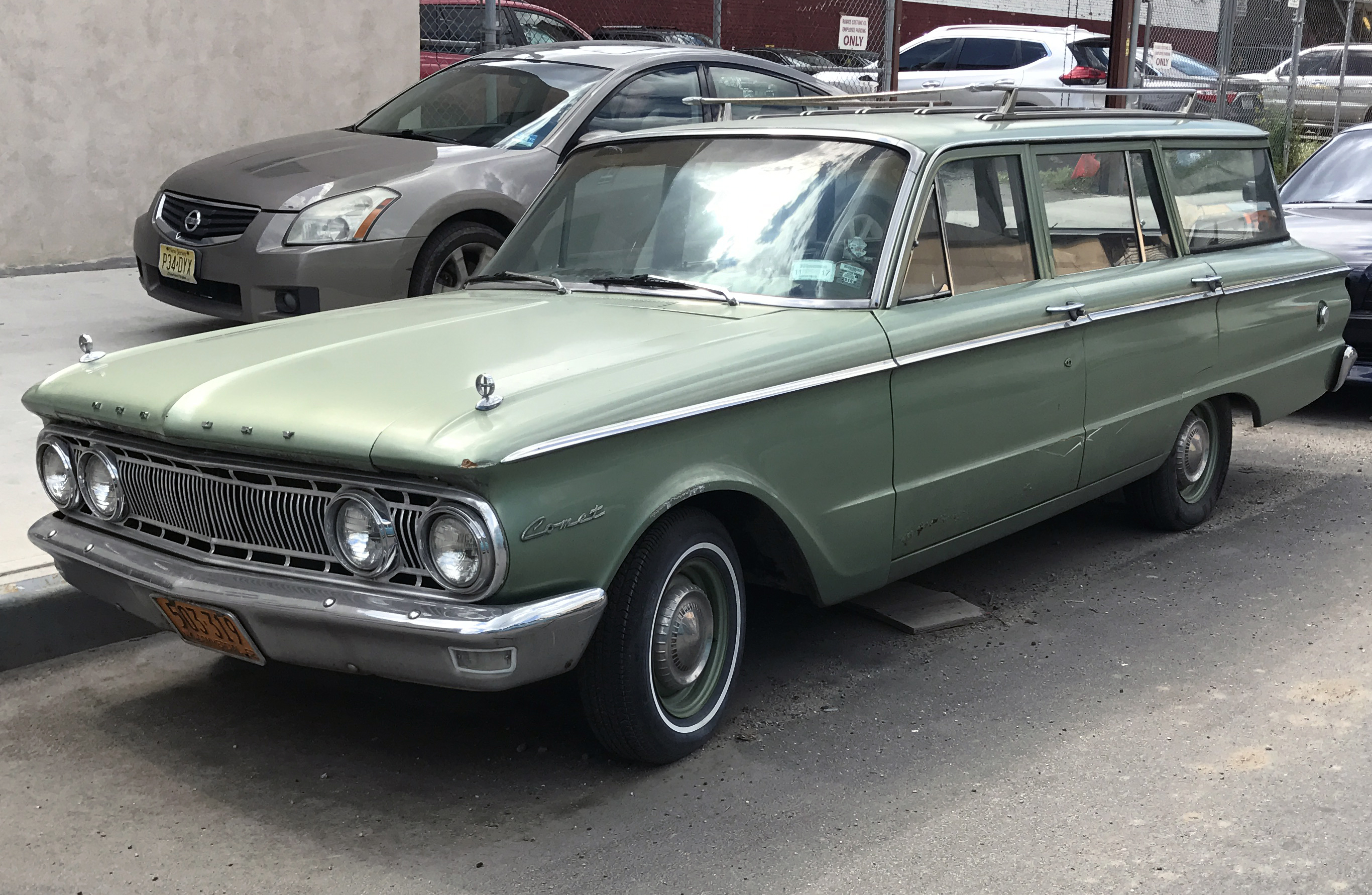
1962 Mercury Comet four-door station wagon

In response to complaints about the low performance of the 144 cid engine, a 170 cid Thriftpower with a single-barrel Holley carburetor producing 101 hp (75 kW) at 4400 rpm was released for the 1961 model year. A new four-speed manual transmission was also an option (a Dagenham without first-gear synchromesh). The changes to the 1961 Comet were minimal, such as moving the Comet script from the front fender to the rear quarter and a new grille design.

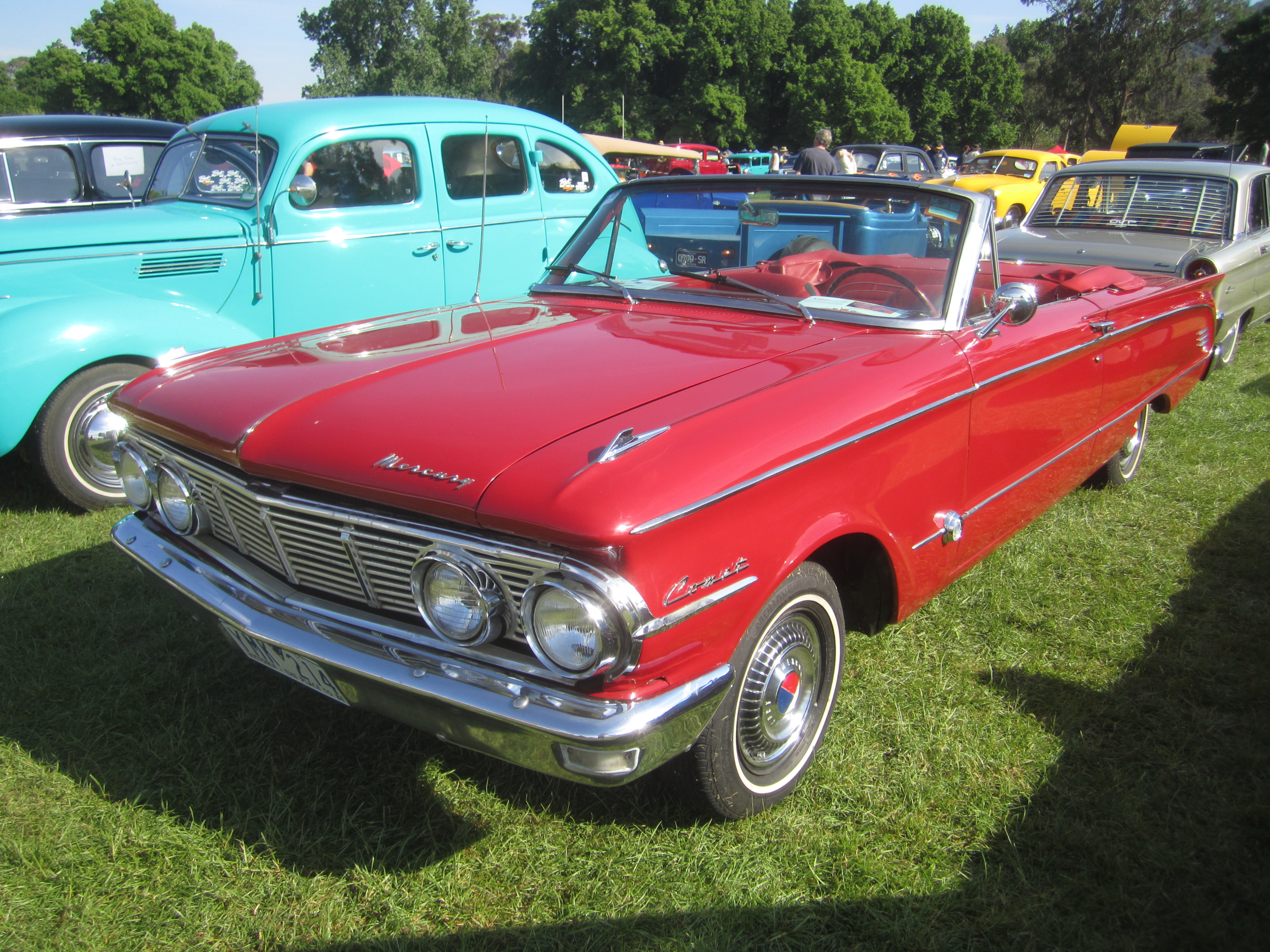
1963 Mercury Comet S-22 convertible

The optional S-22 package was released. Available only on the two-door sedan, it was billed as a "sport" package, although it shared the same mechanicals as regular Comets, with the only changes being S-22 badging, bucket seats, and a center console.

The Comet line of cars was folded under the Mercury brand for the 1962 model year, with Comet models wearing Mercury brand and Comet model emblems. Rear end styling was revised to better resemble other Mercury models such as the Meteor. The S-22 had six bullet-shaped taillights, while regular Comets had four oval with two optional flat reverse lights. A Comet Villager station wagon, basically a Comet Custom four-door station wagon with simulated woodgrain side panels, was added to the lineup. (The Villager name had previously been used to denote the four-door, steel-sided station wagon in the Edsel Ranger series.) The Comet Drive automatic transmission was renamed Merc-O-Matic (unique to the Comet, despite sharing a name with the Merc-O-Matic installed in larger Mercurys).

While the 1963 model looked almost identical to the earlier models, the chassis and suspension were redesigned to accommodate an optional 260 cid V8 engine (borrowed from the Fairlane) using a two-barrel carburetor and producing 164 hp (122 kW). Two new body styles, a Convertible and hardtop (pillar-less) coupe models were added to the Comet Custom and Comet S-22 lines this year.

The front ends of these Comets differed from their Falcon counterparts in that they had four headlights instead of two; similar situations resurfaced in the late 1970s, with the Ford Thunderbird/Mercury Cougar and the Ford Fairmont/Mercury Zephyr.

== Second generation (1964–1965) ==
Second generation
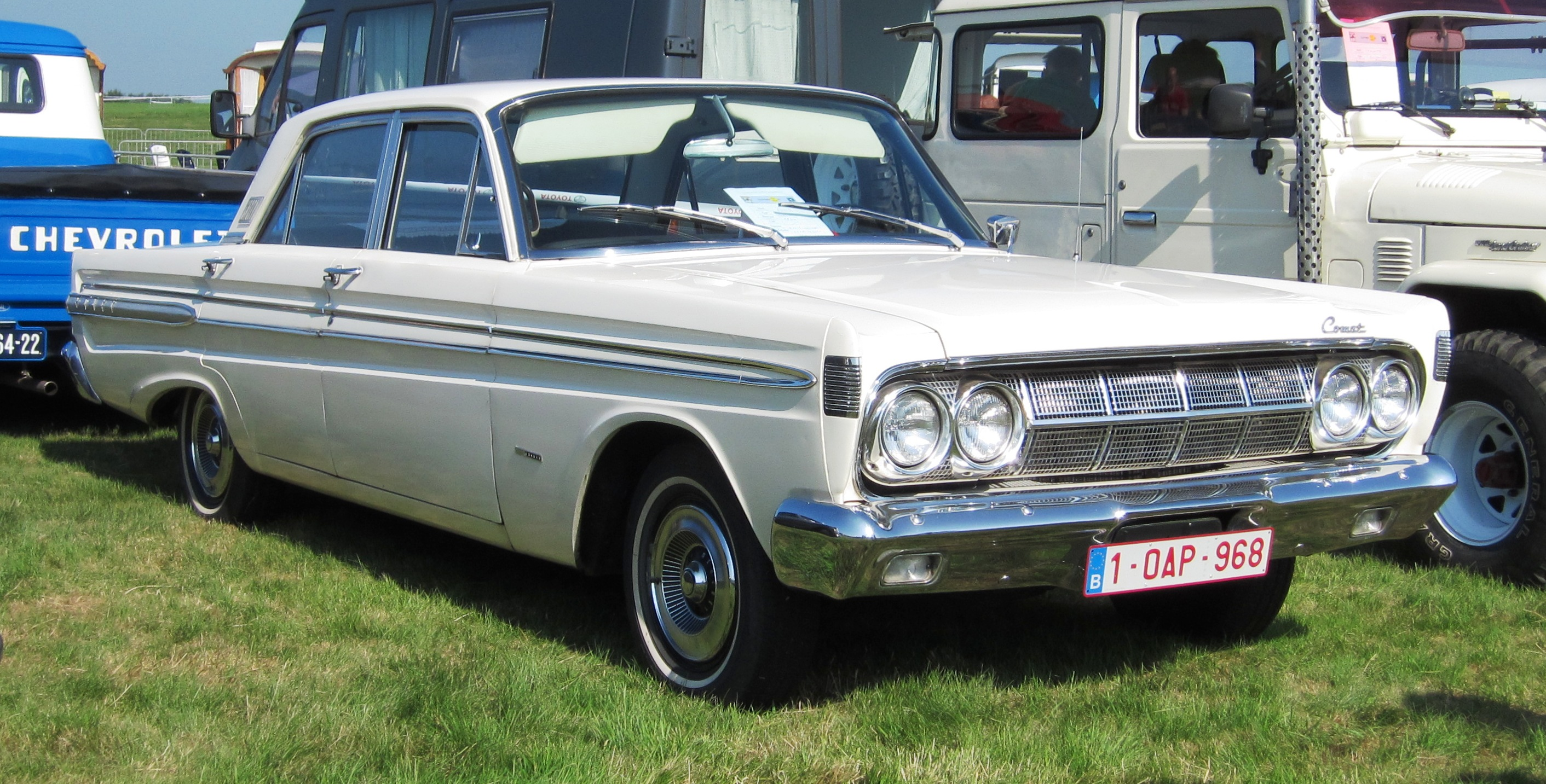
- 1964 Mercury Comet 404 4-door Sedan

Overview
- Production: 1964–1965

Body and chassis
- Body style: 2-door hardtop 2-door convertible 2-door sedan 4-door sedan 4-door station wagon
- Related: Ford Falcon

Powertrain
- Engine: 170 cu in (2.8 L) Thriftpower Six; 200 cu in (3.3 L) Thriftpower Six; 260 cu in (4.3 L) Challenger V8; 289 cu in (4.7 L) Challenger V8; 427 cu in (7.0 L) Ford FE V8
- Transmission: 3-speed automatic 4-speed manual

Dimensions
- Wheelbase: 114 in (2,896 mm) (coupe, sedan); 109.5 in (2,781 mm) (wagon)
- Length: 195 in (4,953 mm)
- Width: 71.5 in (1,816 mm)
- Height: 54.5 in (1,384 mm)

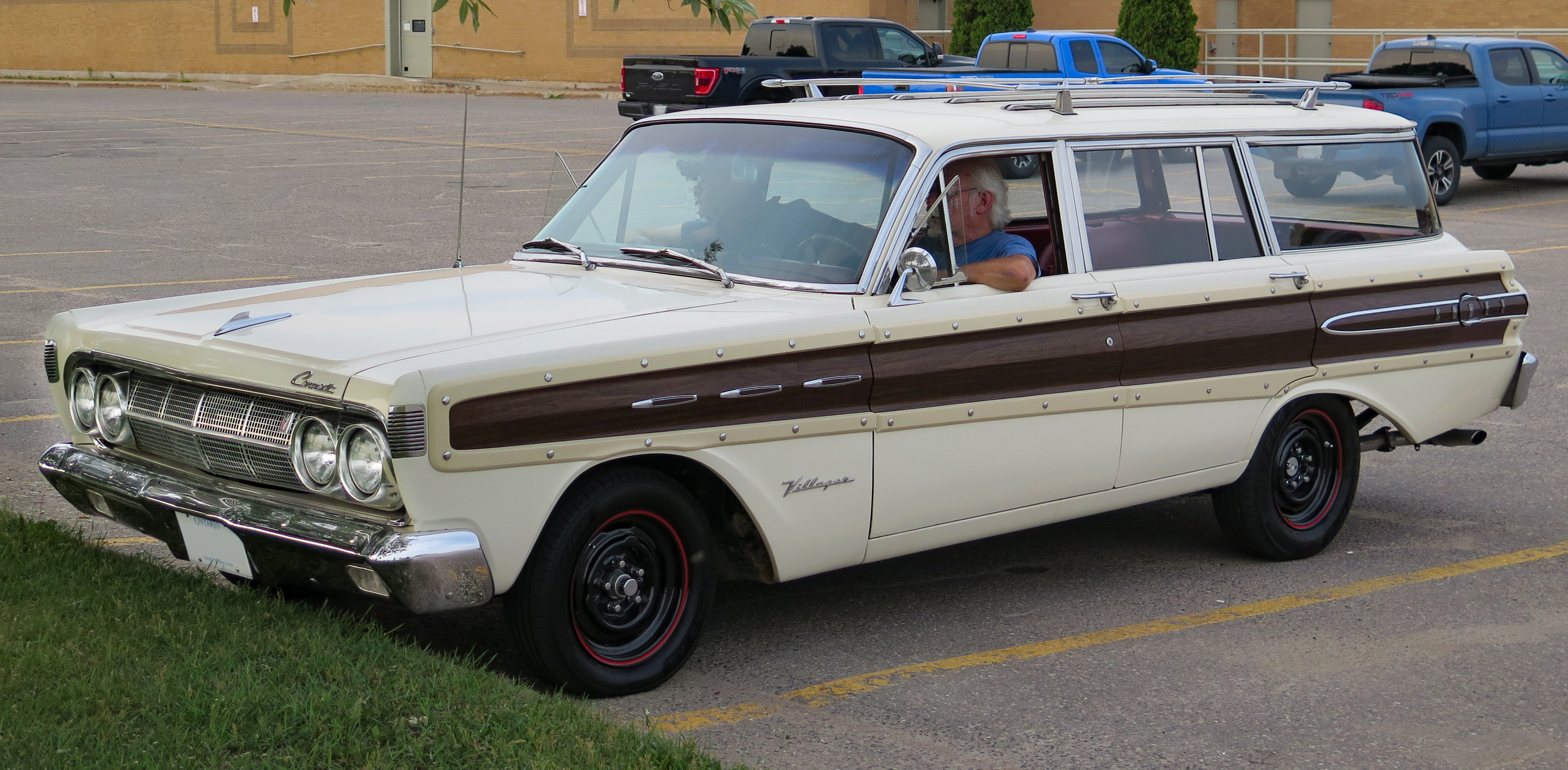
1964 Mercury Comet Villager wagon

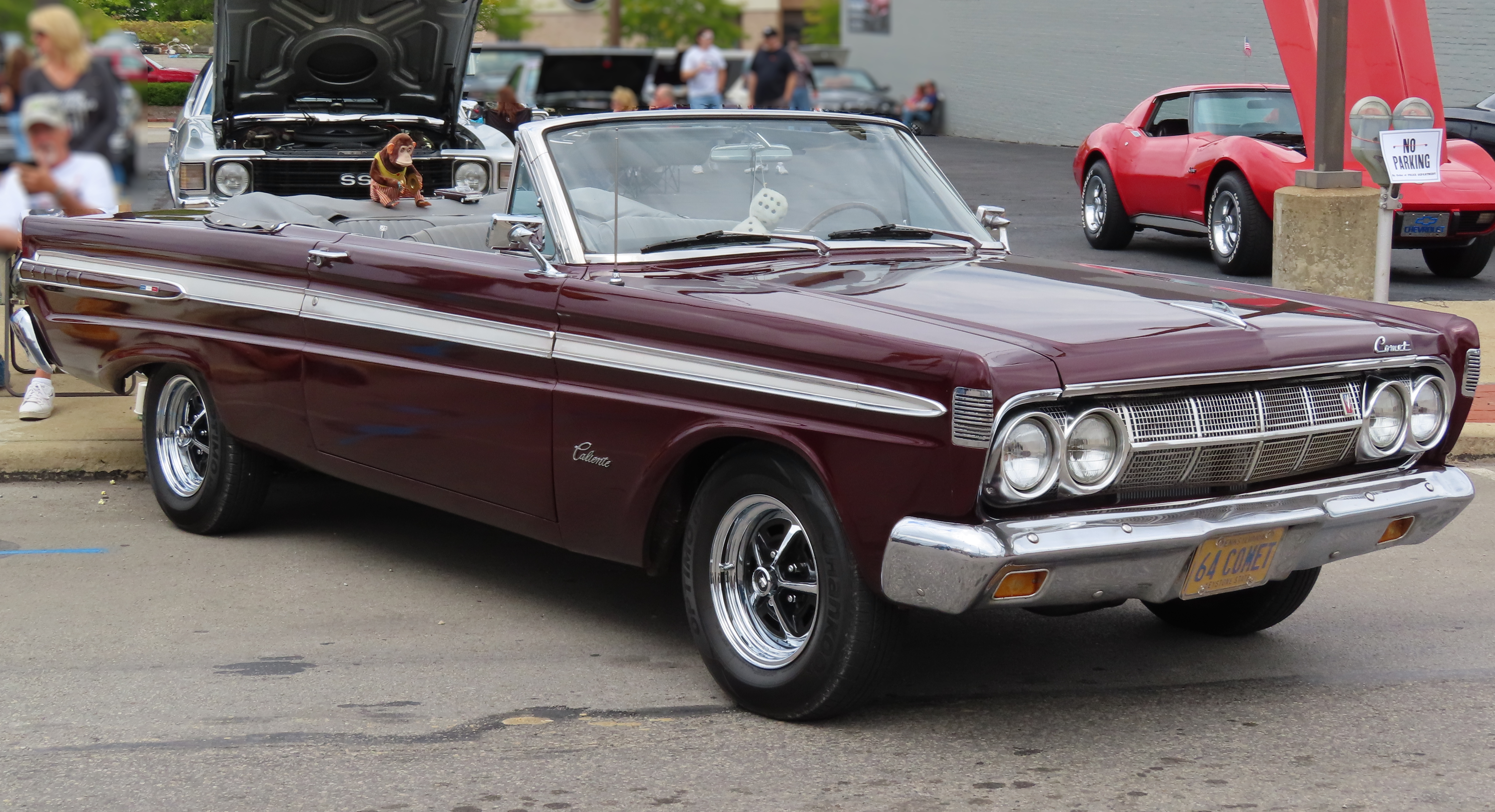
1964 Mercury Comet Caliente convertible

The 1964 Comet was redesigned with a much more square shape, though it was still built on the same unibody as the 1963 model. Its basic lines were shared with the new Falcon, but the front grille used styling similar to that of the Lincoln Continental. Along with the redesign, the model designations were changed. The performance version was known as the Cyclone, replacing the previous S-22. Then in descending order of trim levels were the Caliente, 404, and 202, replacing the previous Custom and base models. The two-door station wagon bodystyle was discontinued. The top-of-the-line station wagon continued to be known as the Villager. The 144 inline-six engine was dropped, leaving the 170 as the base engine. The 260 V8 was available at the beginning of the production run, with the new 289 being available mid-year. Due to the success of the full-sized Ford and Mercury "fastback" roofline introduced in mid-1963, the Falcon and Comet two-door hardtops got a similar roofline with sharper corners.

For 1964, Ford produced about 50 high performance, lightweight Comet Cyclones, equipped with their racing two-carburetor 427 engine, similar to the related Ford Thunderbolt. To avoid competing with each other, the Thunderbolts ran in Super Stock on 7 in (180 mm) tires, but the Cyclones were modified to run in A/FX on 10 in (250 mm) tires, where they were as dominant as the Thunderbolts were in Super Stock. Drivers included Ronnie Sox, Don Nicholson, and Wild Bill Shrewsberry in conjunction with Jack Chrisman. Shrewsberry still owns his original 427 Comet in Caliente trim.

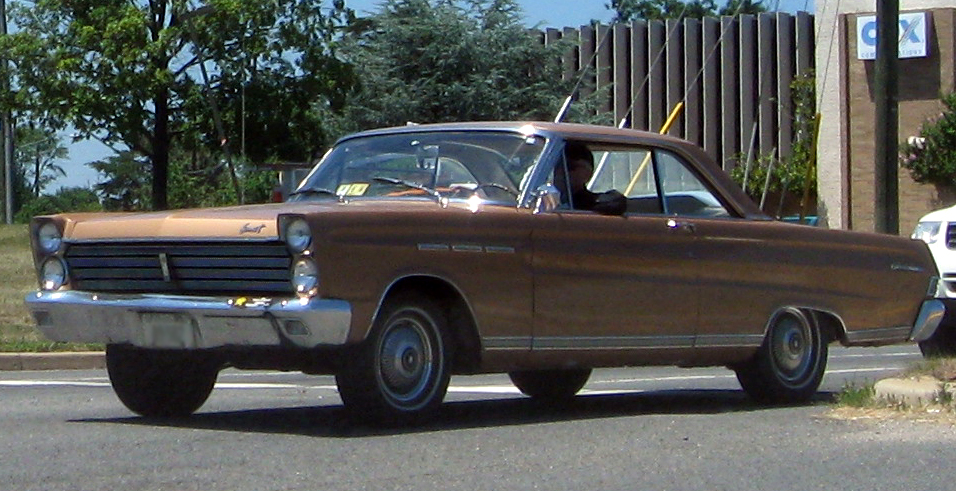
1965 Mercury Comet Caliente two-door hardtop

For 1965, the Comet received updated styling front and rear (including stacked headlights, similar to what full-sized Fords, Pontiacs, and Cadillacs would use at the same time). The base six-cylinder engine was increased from 170 to 200 cubic inches (2.8 to 3.3 L); still using a single-barrel carburetor, it produced 120 hp (89 kW) at 4400 rpm. The base V8 engine was increased from 260 to 289 cubic inches (4.3 to 4.7 L) and, using a two-barrel carburetor, it produced 200 hp (150 kW) at 4400 rpm. The standard transmission continued as a column-shifted, three-speed manual transmission. The optional automatic was changed to a "Merc-O-Matic" three-speed automatic transmission (essentially a Ford C4). The 289 V8 was available in three horsepower ratings: base two-barrel 200 hp, four-barrel 225 hp (168 kW), and the high-performance 271 hp (202 kW) version from the Ford Mustang, paired with a four-speed manual transmission.

== Third generation (1966–1967) ==
Third generation
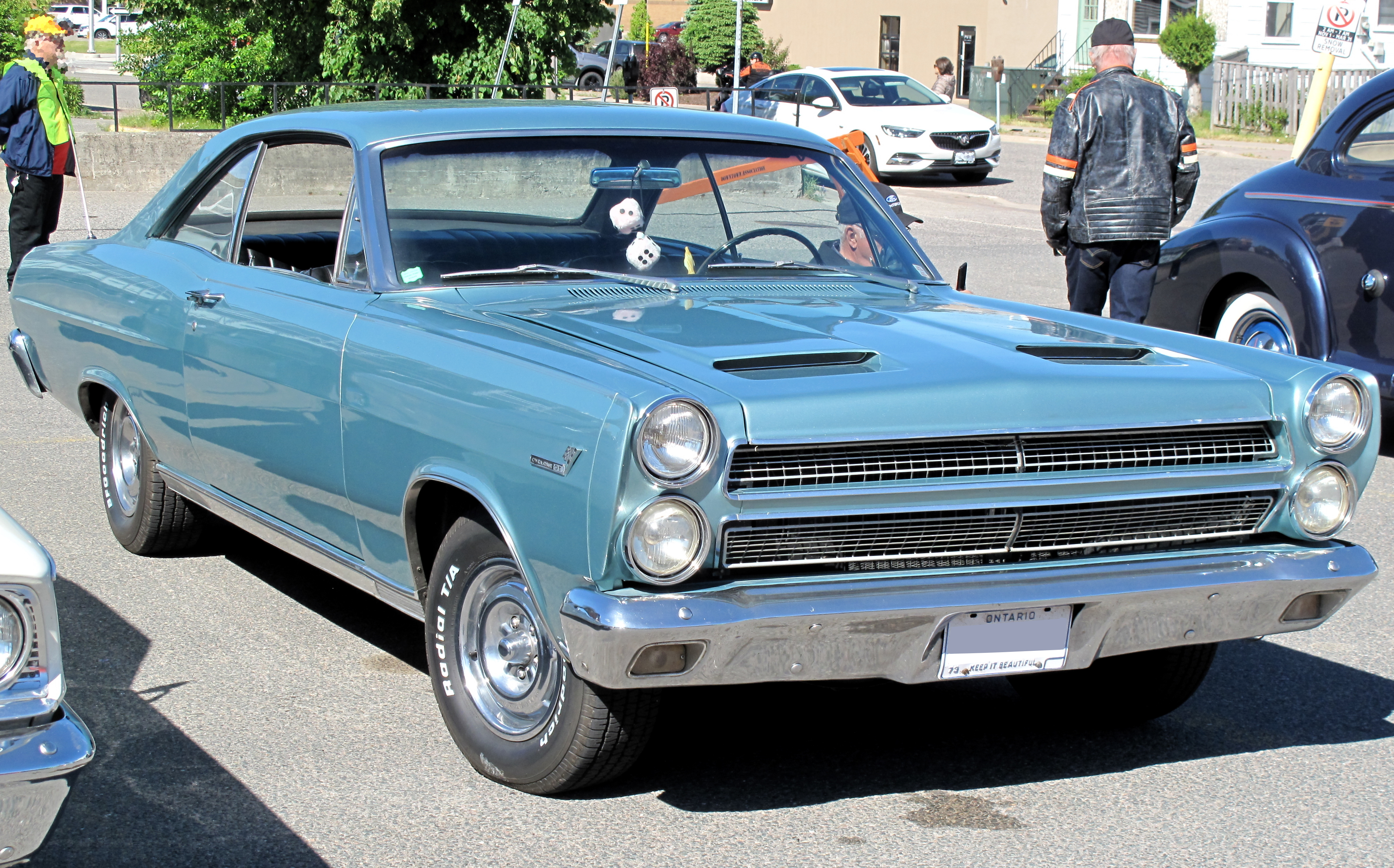
- 1966 Mercury Comet Cyclone GT hardtop

Overview
- Also called: Mercury Caliente; Mercury Capri; Mercury Cyclone; Mercury Villager; Mercury Voyager; (1967 only)
- Production: 1966–1967

Body and chassis
- Body style: 2-door hardtop 2-door convertible 2-door sedan 4-door sedan 4-door station wagon

Powertrain
- Engine: 200 cu in (3.3 L) Thriftpower Six; 289 cu in (4.7 L) Challenger V8; 390 cu in (6.4 L) Ford FE V8

Dimensions
- Wheelbase: 116.0 in (2,946 mm); 113.0 in (2,870 mm) (wagon)
- Length: 203 in (5,156 mm)
- Width: 73.8 in (1,875 mm)
- Height: 54.3 in (1,379 mm)

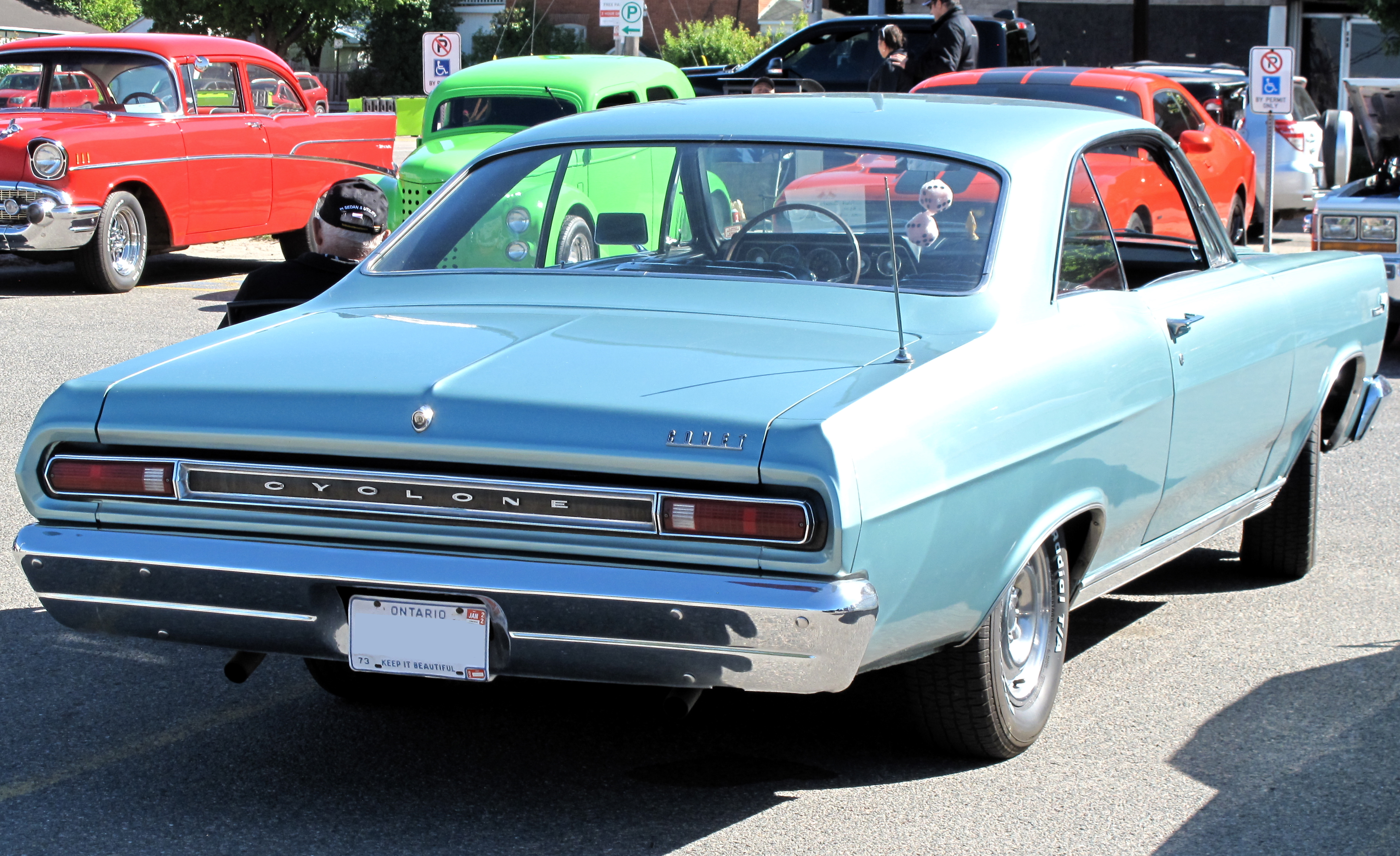
1966 Mercury Comet Cyclone GT

Beginning in 1966, the Comet grew from a compact to become a mid-sized car. It was now based on the same chassis as the Ford Fairlane intermediate (and the previous Mercury Meteor intermediate, which was only offered in 1962–1963). These intermediate-sized cars used the same basic chassis as the original Ford Falcon and Mercury Comet compacts, but were stretched with longer wheelbases. The previous-generation Comet shared its platform with the all-new Ford Mustang in 1964, and when the Comet graduated to the intermediate platform, the Mercury Cougar became the platform shared with the Mustang.

The Comet wagon introduced a Dual-Action tailgate, able to both fold down or swing aside, an idea soon copied by all the major U.S. manufacturers.

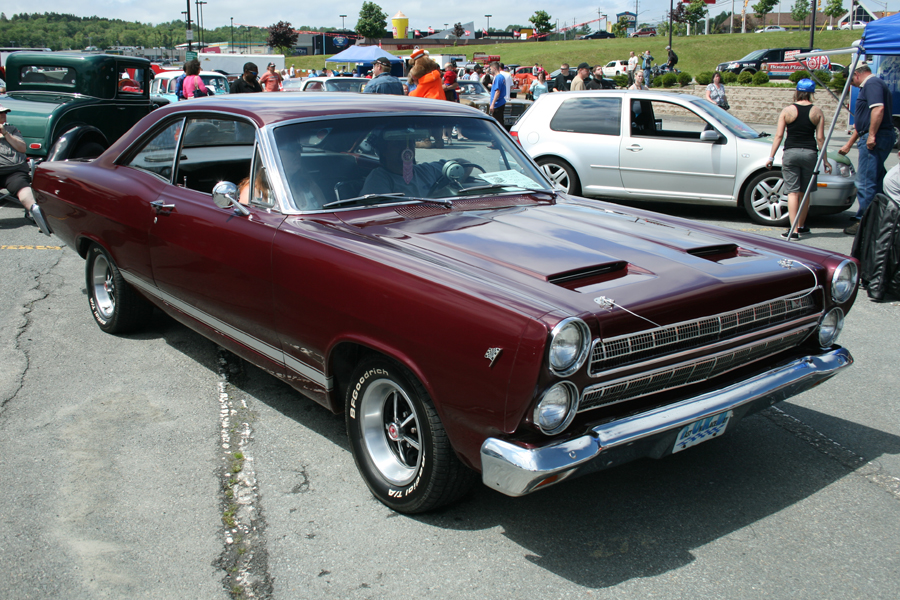
1966 Mercury Comet Cyclone GT hardtop

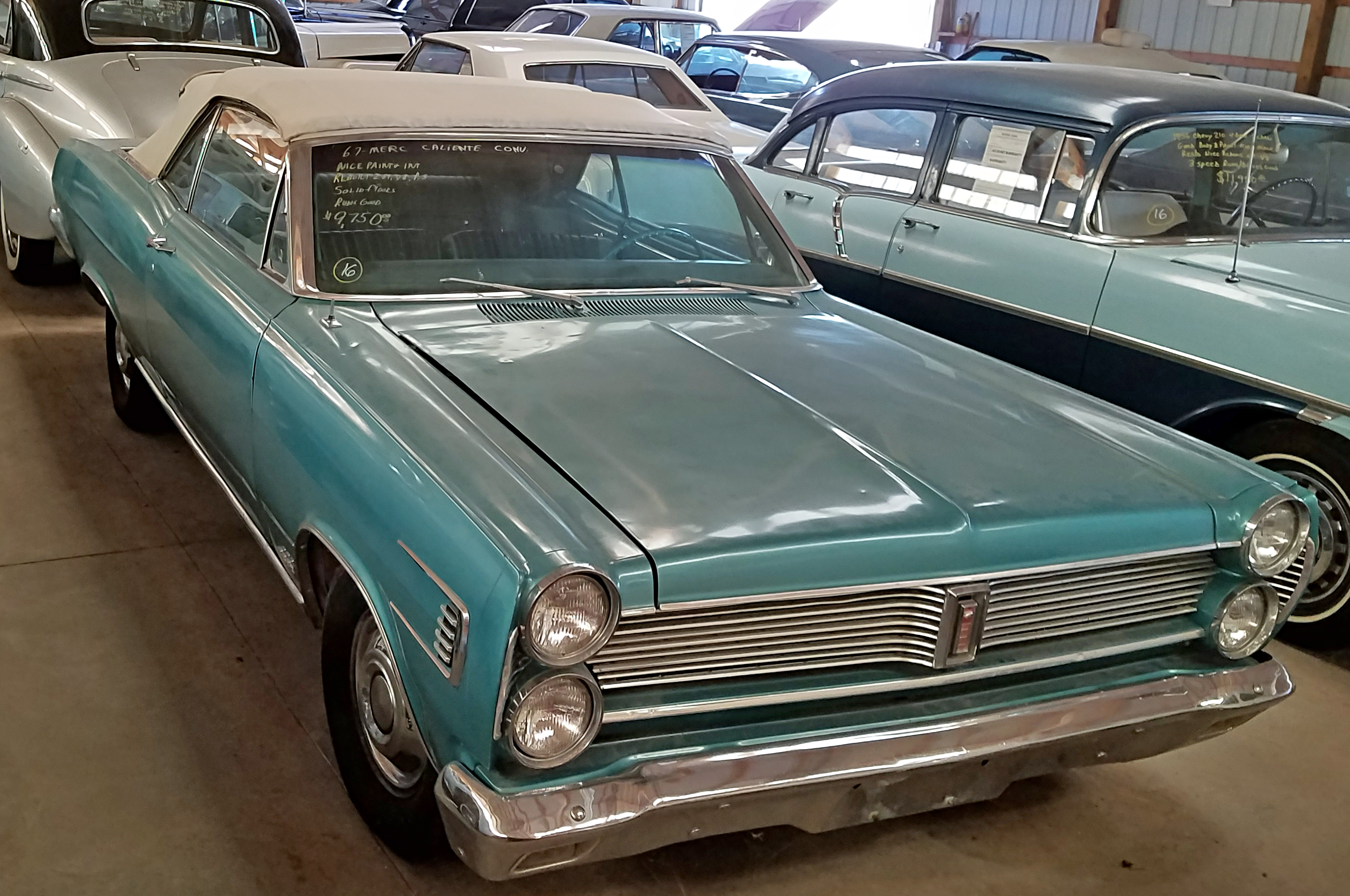
1967 Mercury Comet Caliente convertible

The 1966 Comet received distinct outer body panels. The Comet Capri replaced the previous Comet 404 and the Comet Voyager four-door station wagon replaced the previous Comet 404 station wagon. The Voyager name had previously been used to designate a full-sized Mercury station wagon that was positioned between the base Commuter and the top-of-the-line Colony Park station wagon models. The Comet 202 four-door station wagon was discontinued. The new top-of-the-line series was the Comet Cyclone GT.

New engines available in the Comet for 1966 included a 390 cid V8 engine with a two-barrel carburetor producing 265 hp (198 kW) at 4400 rpm, a 390 cid V8 engine with a four-barrel carburetor producing 275 hp (205 kW), and 390 cid V8 engine that produced 335 hp (250 kW). The 335 hp 390 cid V8 engine was standard on the Cyclone GT and optional on other models. The Cyclone GT when equipped with an automatic transmission was referred to as the Cyclone GTA.

A Cyclone GT convertible was the pace car for the 1966 Indianapolis 500.

Beginning with the 1967 model year, the Comet name was used only on the base Comet 202 model, available only in two- or four-door sedan body styles. Other models were now referred to by what had previously been their subseries names. Mercury's mid-sized line-up ranged from the basic Comet 202, through the Capri, Caliente, Cyclone, and Cyclone GT models, as well as steel-sided Voyager and simulated wood-paneled Villager station wagon models, which were comparable to the Capri.

In 1967, the Comet was offered in very limited numbers with the famed 427 cubic inch FE "side-oiler" V8 engine, either as a single 4-barrel (the W-code with 410 horsepower) or a dual-4-barrel setup (known as the "R" code with 425 horsepower, just like the similar Ford Fairlane.) Only 60 cars were powered by the 427, with 51 produced with the "R" code and nine of those 60 produced with the W-code 427. Six of those were Capris and four were Calientes, with no convertibles produced. Only one W-code equipped car was a Capri, which makes it the rarest Mercury ever. All 427-powered Comets were equipped with a 4-speed Toploader transmission, a 9-inch rear end with 3.89:1 gears, and a Traction-Lok limited-slip differential. Mercury also lightened these cars by removing the sound deadening (saving about 150 pounds) in an effort to increase performance. Some cars also had the battery relocated to the trunk to move more weight over the rear wheels and increase traction, which also improved performance for drag racing.

== Fourth generation (1968–1969) ==
Fourth generation
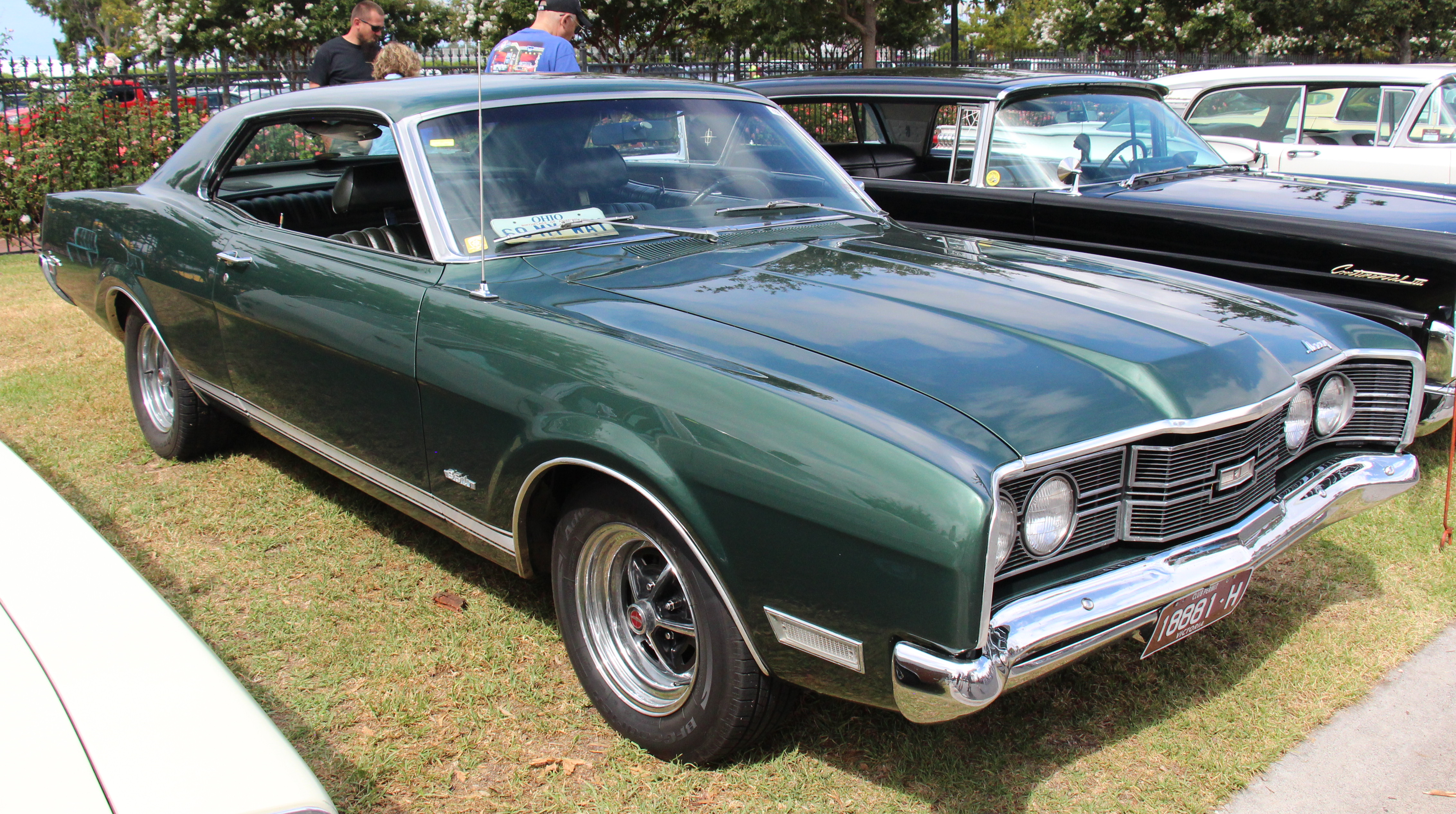
- 1969 Mercury Comet Sports Coupe (with non-standard wheels)

Overview
- Production: 1968–1969

Body and chassis
- Body style: 2-door hardtop

Powertrain
- Engine: 250 cu in (4.1 L) Thriftpower Six; 289 cu in (4.7 L) Challenger V8; 302 cu in (4.9 L) 302 V8; 351 cu in (5.8 L) 351 V8; 428 cu in (7.0 L) FE V8

Dimensions
- Wheelbase: 116 in (2,946 mm); 113 in (2,870 mm) (station wagon)
- Length: 206.1 in (5,235 mm)
- Width: 76 in (1,930 mm)
- Height: 53.5 in (1,359 mm)

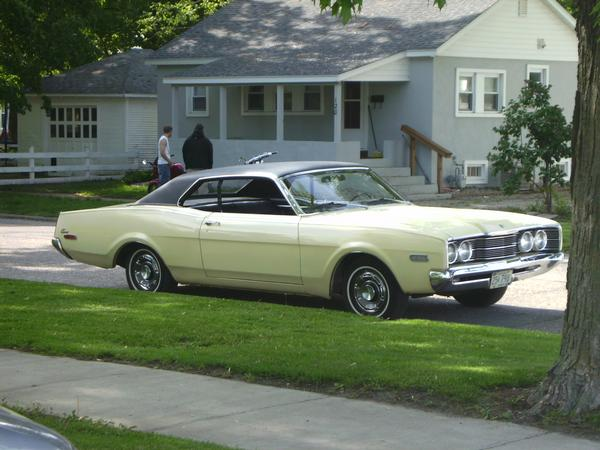
1968 Mercury Comet sports coupe

In 1968, Mercury's mid-sized models again received new sheet metal and styling that resembled the full-sized Mercury models and shared their chassis and many parts with Ford's mid-sized Fairlane and Torino models. The mid-sized base model was the Comet (Mercury dropped the 202 suffix) available only as a two-door coupe. The Capri was replaced by the Montego, and the Caliente by the Montego MX. Also, the more luxurious Montego MX Brougham was basically an option package for the Montego MX. Top-of-the-line, mid-sized models continued to use the Cyclone and Cyclone GT names.

A 302 cid V8 engine using a two-barrel carburetor and generating 210 hp (160 kW) at 4600 rpm would replace the previous 289 cid V8 midway in the 1968 model year. For the 1969 model year, the grille was modified and the headlight surrounds were removed. The taillights were also slightly restyled. Few changes to Mercury's mid-sized lineup were made for the 1969 model year, the last year that the Comet name graced a mid-sized model. A Comet four-door sedan for 1969 was supposedly planned, but never offered. New top-of-the-line Cyclone Spoiler and Cyclone CJ models joined the lineup.

A 250 cid inline-six using a single-barrel carburetor and generating 155 hp (116 kW) at 4000 rpm replaced the previous 200 cid 6 as standard. New engine options included a 302 cid V-8 engine using a four-barrel carburetor and generating 220 hp (160 kW) at 4400 rpm (standard on the Cyclone), a 351 cid V-8 using a four-barrel carburetor generating 290 hp (220 kW) at 5200 rpm (standard on the Cyclone Spoiler), and a 428 cid V-8 using a four-barrel carburetor generating 335 hp (250 kW) at 5200 rpm (standard on the Cyclone CJ). These new V-8s replaced the previous 390 cid V-8s.

After 1969, the use of the Comet name was suspended as the base model for Mercury's intermediate model line became the Montego. The Cyclone name continued to be used through the 1971 model year.

== Fifth generation (1971–1977) ==
Fifth generation
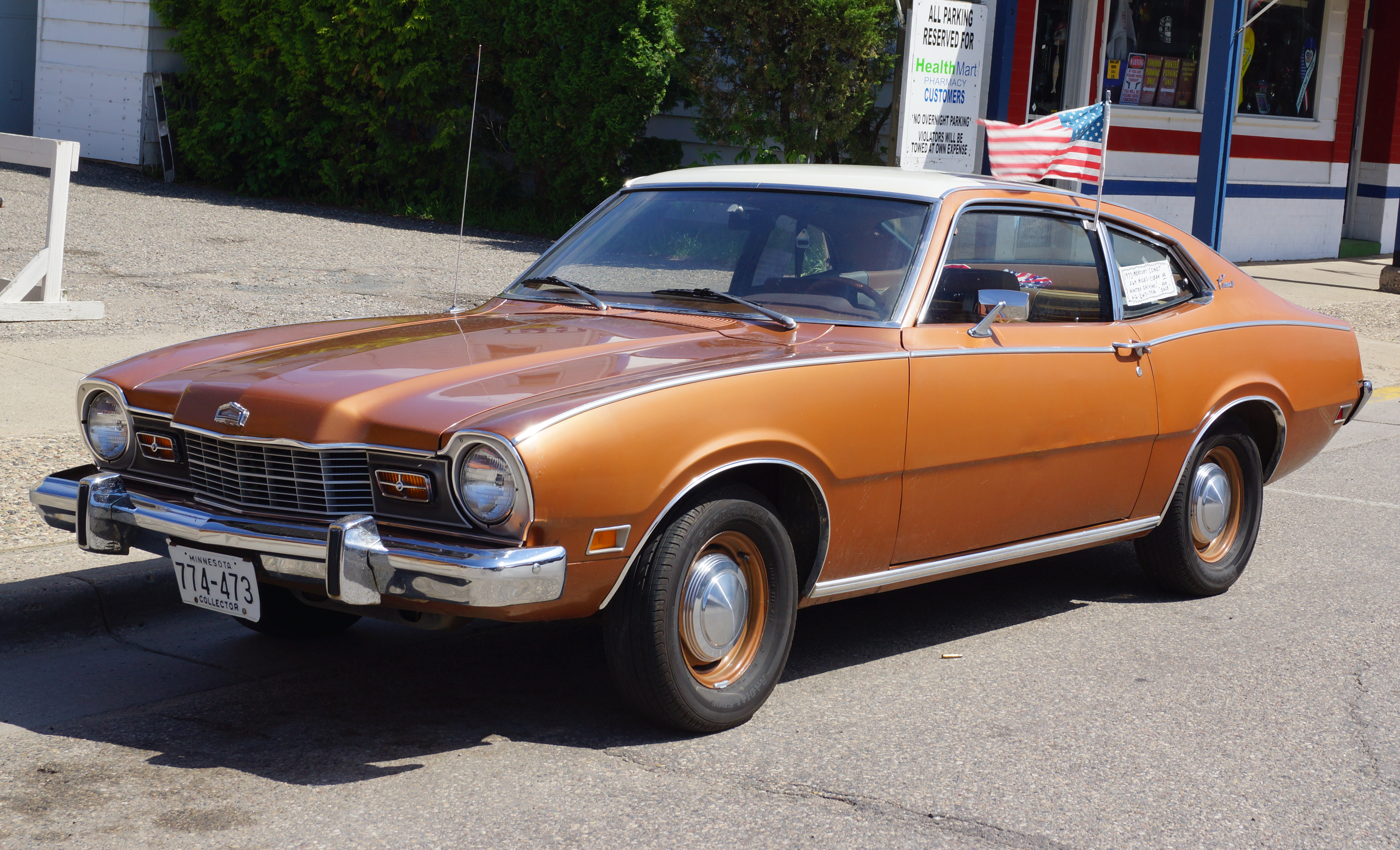
- 1973 Mercury Comet

Overview
- Production: 1971–1977

Body and chassis
- Body style: 2-door sedan 4-door sedan
- Related: Ford Maverick

Powertrain
- Engine: 170 cu in (2.8 L) Ford I6; 200 cu in (3.3 L) Ford I6; 302 cu in (4.9 L) Ford 302 V8
- Transmission: 3-speed automatic 3-speed manual

Dimensions
- Wheelbase: 103 in (2,616 mm) (2-door); 109 in (2,769 mm) (4-door)
- Length: 181.7 in (4,615 mm) (1971-1973); 187.7 in (4,768 mm) (1974-1977)
- Width: 70.5 in (1,791 mm)
- Height: 53.5 in (1,359 mm) (2-door); 53.4 in (1,356 mm) (4-door)

For 1971, the Comet name was revived on Mercury's version of the Ford Maverick compact. Sharing most of its sheet metal with the Maverick, it used a different grille, taillights, and hood, as well as different badging. The taillight pods were shared with the 1970 and 1971 Montego and Cyclone models. Underneath it all was the same basic chassis that had originally been used for the Ford Falcon, the original Comet, and for the mid-sized Ford Fairlane, Mercury Meteor, and later Mercury Comets.

The base engine was the 170 cid inline-six with a single-barrel carburetor producing 100 hp (75 kW) at 4200 rpm. Optional engines were the 200 cid inline-six with a single-barrel carburetor producing 115 hp (86 kW) and a 302 cid V8 with a two-barrel carburetor producing 210 hp (157 kW). Transmissions were either a three-speed manual or three-speed automatic with either column or floor-mounted shifters.

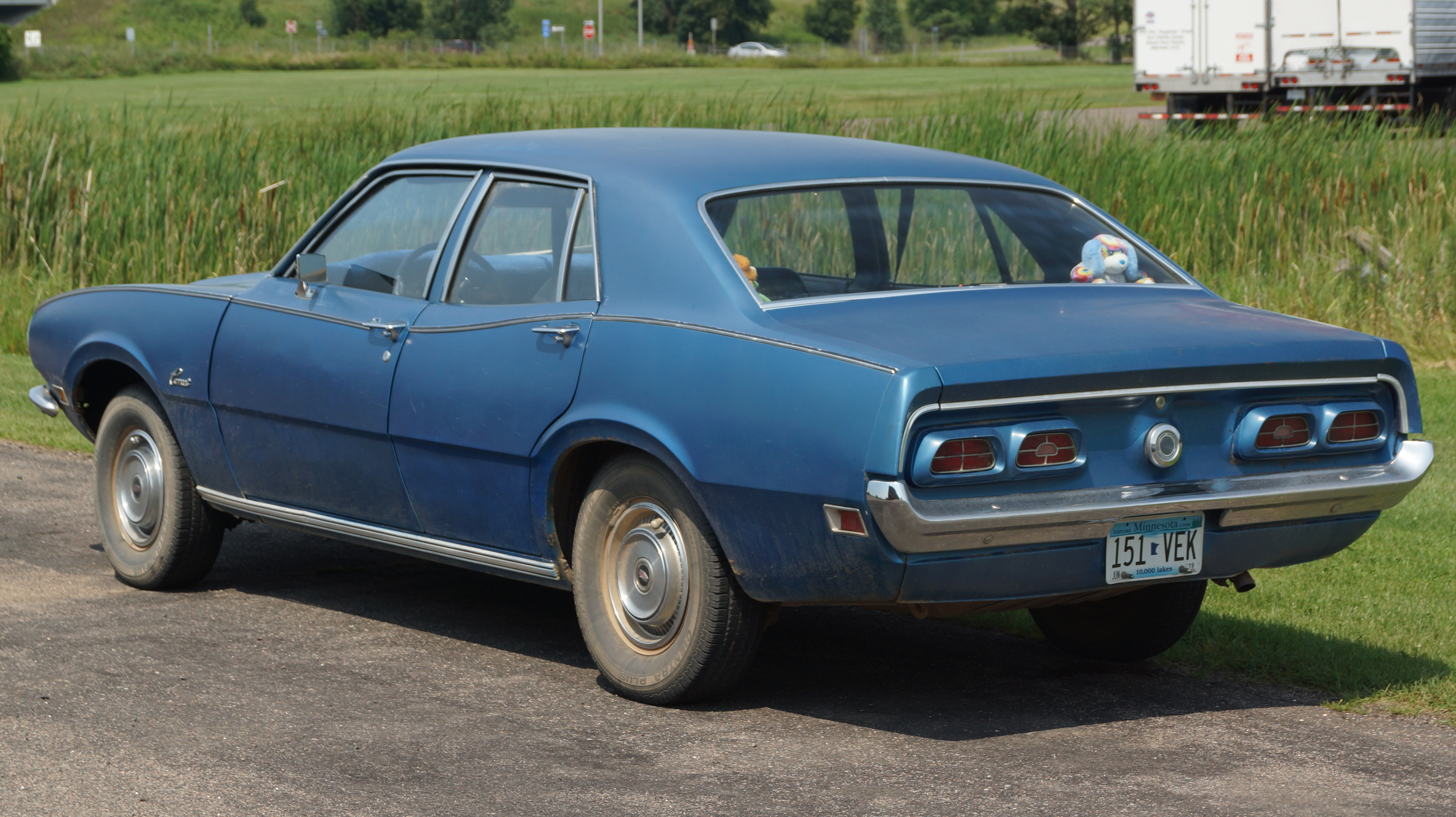
1971 Mercury Comet four-door sedan

The Comet was available as two- and four-door sedans and in base (1971–1977), and "muscle car" Comet GT series (two-door sedan-only 1971-1975). The GT featured a blacked-out grille, dual body-side tape stripes, high-back bucket seats, wheel trim rings, dual racing mirrors, bright window frames, black instrument panel, deluxe door trim panels, and a simulated hood scoop.

In 1972 models, the base 170 cid six was rated at 82 hp (61 kW) at 4400 rpm, the 200 cid six at 91 hp (68 kW), and the 302 cid V8 at 138 hp (103 kW). A new engine option for 1972 was the 250 cid six with a single-barrel carburetor rated at 98 hp (73 kW).

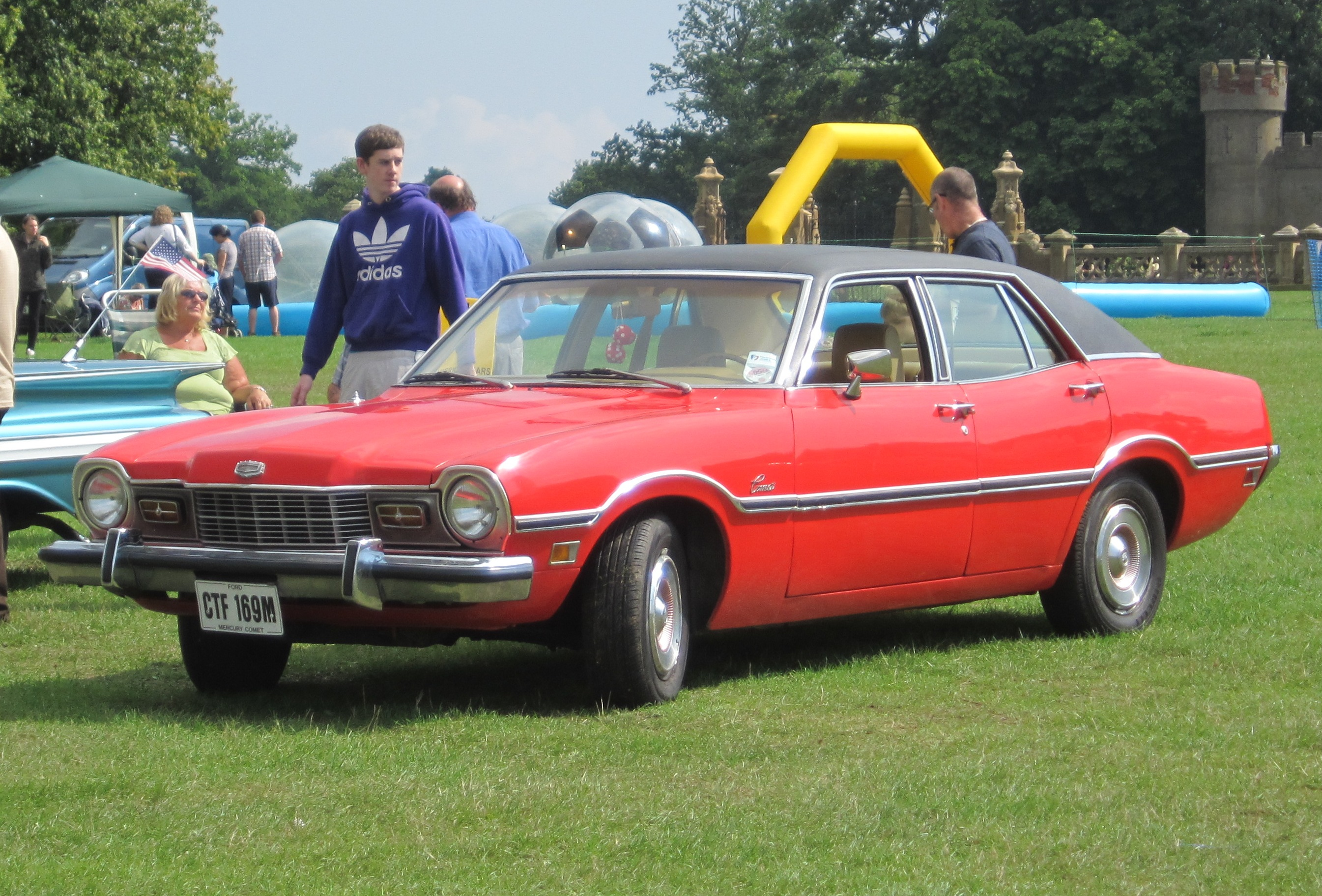
1973 Mercury Comet four-door sedan

For 1973 models, the base 170 cid six was dropped and the 200 cid six became the base engine. Horsepower ratings would fluctuate slightly up or down through the years the Comet would remain in production, but not by very much. A new, larger front bumper to meet federal standards was added to all models in 1973. A new Custom decor package featuring vinyl roof, body-colored wheel covers, wide vinyl-insert body-side moldings, vinyl bucket seats, luxury carpeting, and extra sound insulation was a popular option.

Changes for 1974 included even larger front bumpers and new larger rear bumpers to match due to new federal mandates for safety. They added 2.5 inches (64 mm) to the length of the two-door model and 4 inches (102 mm) to the length of the four-door model.

Ford had originally planned to the replace the Comet and its Ford Maverick counterpart for the 1975 model year with updated and extensively redesigned models that would continue to use the Comet and Maverick names. Fairly late, though, they decided that the updated versions would be built alongside the original Maverick and the Comet that had originally been introduced for 1971. These would-be replacements, also using the same basic chassis as the Comet and Maverick, became the Mercury Monarch and the American Ford Granada; these came with more standard and optional equipment than the Comet and Maverick, and were considered to be "luxury compacts", a step up from the Comet and Maverick.

Although 1975 was the last year for the Mercury Comet GT, the GT features remained available in 1976 and 1977 with the "Sports Accent" option group.

The model was offered with comparatively few changes through the 1977 model year, and was then discontinued to make room for the new Mercury Zephyr for the 1978 model year.

== High mileage record ==
In July 2010, USA Today reported on a 91-year-old Florida woman, Rachel Veitch, who was still driving her 1964 Comet Caliente daily. The car was purchased new, and Veitch set a record by accumulating over 562,000 documented miles. The car was retired in 2012 after accumulating 576,000 miles, as Veitch had decided to stop driving due to her eyesight becoming too weak.

== Mercury Cyclone ==
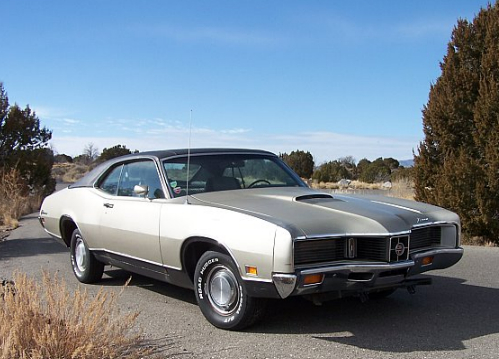
1971 Mercury Cyclone

The Cyclone was a performance model of the Comet, built from 1964–1971 and mirroring the Comet's changes. The 1971 model year was the Cyclone's last, as the muscle car wars wound down, and it was absorbed into the Mercury Montego line.

== Sources ==
- Burness, Tad, American Car Spotter's Guide (Osceola, WI: Motorbooks International, 1978 & 1981)
- Flammang, James M. & Kowlake, Ron, Standard Catalog of American Cars: 1976-199, 3rd Edition (Iola, WI: Krause Publications, 1999)
- Gunnell, John, Standard Catalog of American Cars: 1946-1975, Revised 4th Edition (Iola, WI: Krause Publications, 2002)
