= Meteor (automobile) =

Defunct brand name of automobile by the Ford Motor Company of Canada

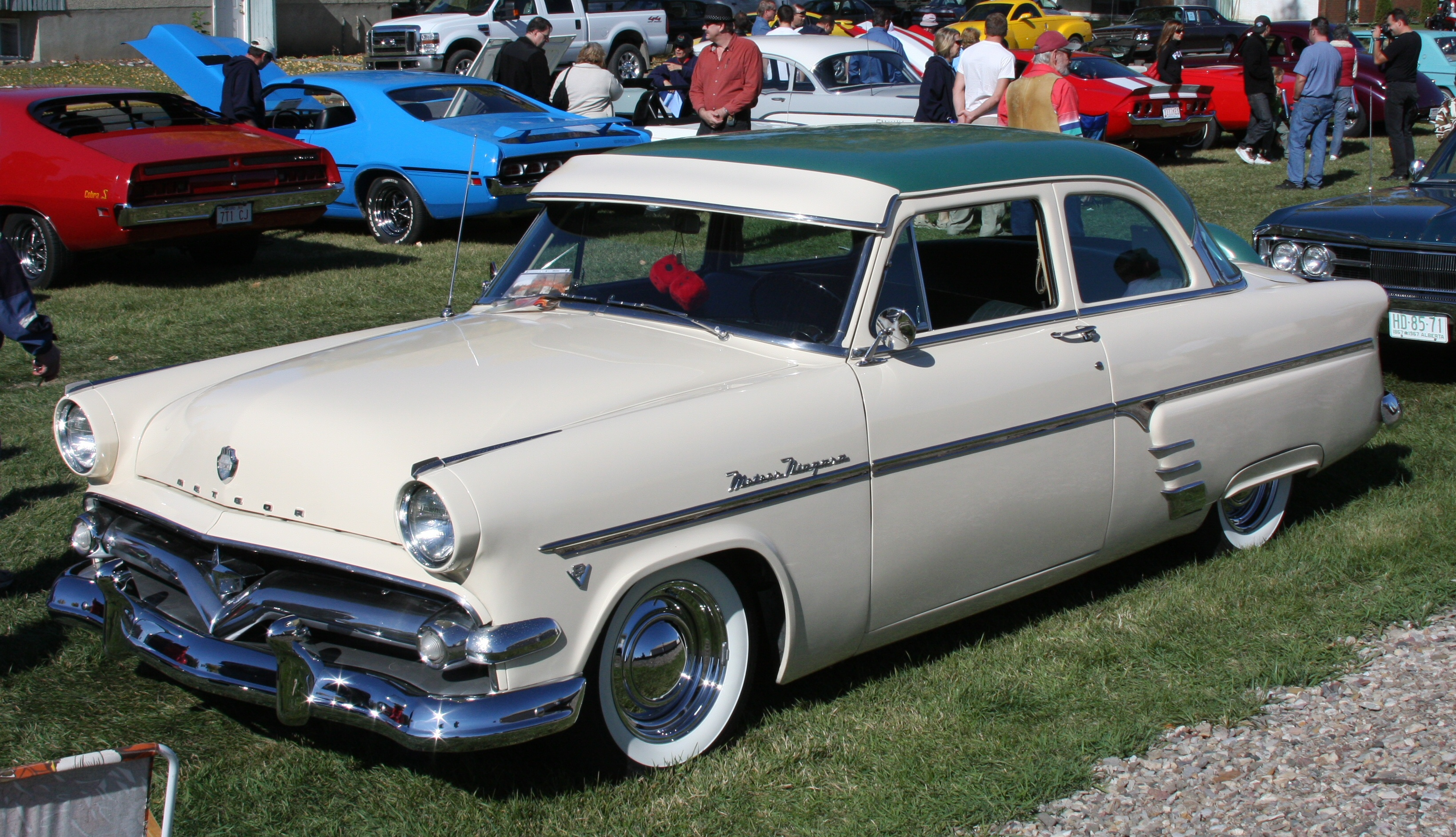
- 1954 Meteor Niagara Two-door Sedan
- Product type: Automobile
- Current owner: Ford
- Produced by: Ford Canada
- Country: Canada
- Introduced: 1949
- Discontinued: 1976; 50 years ago
- Related brands: Mercury Meteor
- Markets: Canada

Meteor was a marque of automobiles offered by Ford Motor Company of Canada from 1949 to 1961 and from 1964 to 1976. It succeeded the Mercury 114, a Canadian-market Mercury based on the Ford, the "114" name being taken from the car's wheelbase.

The Meteor was introduced to complement the Mercury and to give Canadian Mercury-Lincoln dealers a car to sell in the low-price market, against the Canadian Pontiac. Similarly, Canadian Ford dealers offered the Monarch, a line of cars based on the Mercury models, to compete against the Oldsmobile. This was due to the dealer structure in Canada, where smaller communities might have only a single dealer that was expected to carry a full line of models in both the low- and mid-price classes. From 1949–1959, Meteor typically ran fourth in overall sales, behind Chevrolet, Ford, and Pontiac. The make was retired for the 1962 and 1963 model years. In these years the name was used for the Mercury Meteor which was sold in Canada and the United States. From 1970, the Meteor was referred to as the Mercury Meteor.

== History ==
The initial 1949 Meteor was introduced on June 25, 1948, at the same time the Ford Deluxe and Custom series were introduced across North America, and shared the new postwar full-sized Ford bodies, chassis, and powertrains but with unique trim. It used a Mercury grille and was powered by a 100 bhp (75 kW), 239 CID flathead V8 similar to that used in 1946–1953 U.S. Ford passenger cars. Meteor, as well as the Canadian Ford, kept the flathead V8 engine through 1954. The new OHV V8 which US Fords offered beginning in 1954 was not introduced in Canada until the 1955 model year. The following year, Ford of Canada introduced a six-cylinder engine for Canadian Ford cars. Meteor models continued to use the Ford body with unique items such as grilles, taillights, and moldings. From 1952 Meteor models used Ford's new Mainline, Customline, and Crestline model names. The 1952–1954 Meteors used Mercury instrument panels and dashboards. In mid-1954, some Niagara and Rideau models began using Ford instrument panels and dashes. These cars were named Niagara Special and Rideau Special and were priced around C$67 less than regular Niagaras or Rideaus.

For 1954, Meteors no longer shared their model names with Ford models. The entry-level Meteor Mainline was discontinued and the new base model did not have a specific model name. The mid-level Meteor Customline was replaced with the Meteor Niagara and the top trim level Meteor Crestline was replaced with the Meteor Rideau.

A rebadged, Canadian-built version of the Ford Ranchero was added in 1957, and continued to be produced until 1958 as the "Meteor Ranchero." The Montcalm series was added in mid-1959 as a counterpart to Ford's new Galaxie models.

Meteor was discontinued as a brand name after 1961 for a number of reasons. The Meteor name was selected for a new vehicle introduced in the Mercury line, the intermediate sized Mercury Meteor, beginning in 1962, and the entire Mercury line had already been dropped down in price (moving closer to the niche previously served by the Meteor brand in Canada) due to slow Mercury sales and the discontinuation of the Edsel brand.

=== Model names ===
378,463 were built in model years 1949 through 1961, using the following model names:

- De Luxe / Deluxe (1949–1950)
- Custom (1949)
- Custom Deluxe (1950–1951)
- Custom Deluxe Victoria (pillarless hardtop coupe; 1951)
- Mainline (1952–1953)
- Customline (1952–1953)
- Customline Victoria (pillarless hardtop coupe; 1952)
- Sedan Delivery (1953–1961) (mainline Sedan Delivery for 1952)
- Crestline Victoria (pillarless hardtop coupe; 1953)
- Meteor (1954–1961)
- Niagara/Niagara 300 (1954–1959)
- Rideau/Rideau 500 (1954–1961)
- Rideau Skyliner (pillarless hardtop with plexiglass roof; 1954)
- Rideau Victoria (pillarless hardtop coupe; 1954)
- Rideau Crown Victoria (1955)
- Ranchero (1957–1958)
- Montcalm (1958–1961)
- Country Sedan
- Ranch Wagon

The Meteor name was not its own brand in model years 1962 and 1963, replaced by the Mercury Meteor, based on the Ford Fairlane. When the brand returned for 1964 they were based on the full-size Mercury rather than Fords as earlier. About 255,000 Meteors were built between 1964 and 1976, in six different series:

- Meteor (1964)
- Custom (1964)
- Rideau/Rideau 500 (1965–1976)
- Montcalm (1965–1976)
- Montego (1967)
- LeMoyne (1968–1970)

== 1964 ==
Due to dealer pressure, however, Ford released a lower-priced "Mercury 400" in 1963 that stood in the price bracket formerly occupied by the Meteor. When the intermediate Mercury Meteor was dropped after 1963, Ford of Canada relaunched Meteor as a standalone make in 1964, and dropped Mercury's Monterey series in Canada. The 1964 Meteor looked nearly identical to the 1964 Mercury, save for its Ford dashboard and interior, and was available in a base and Custom series. Sedans, hardtops, and a convertible were offered. It appears that most, if not all, 1964 Meteor closed models were of the "Breezeway" style, featuring a blocky C-pillar with retractable rear window, while Mercurys offered sleeker "Marauder" models.

== 1965–1969 ==
For 1965, the full range of model names that had existed in 1961 returned: Rideau, Rideau 500, and Montcalm. The cars used Ford Galaxie bodies but had Mercury-styled front and rear styling. The Montego was added as a top-range model for 1967, but when that name was selected for use by Mercury in the U.S. beginning in 1968, it was renamed LeMoyne. A sport-themed Montcalm S-33 model was available from 1966-68. These cars were all basically Ford Galaxies with Mercury styling, they even used Ford's full size wheel covers.

== 1970–1976 ==
For 1970, the Meteor was referred to as the Mercury Meteor, although it was still consider a separate marque from Mercury. In line with this, the 1970 Meteor brochure referred to the cars as Mercury Meteors whereas the 1969 Meteor brochure did not mention the name Mercury.

== 1977–1981 ==
After 1976, the Rideau 500 and Montcalm names, as well as the unique trim items, were dropped. The Meteor name was then used on a lower-priced variant of the Mercury Marquis, called the Mercury Marquis Meteor, built until 1981.

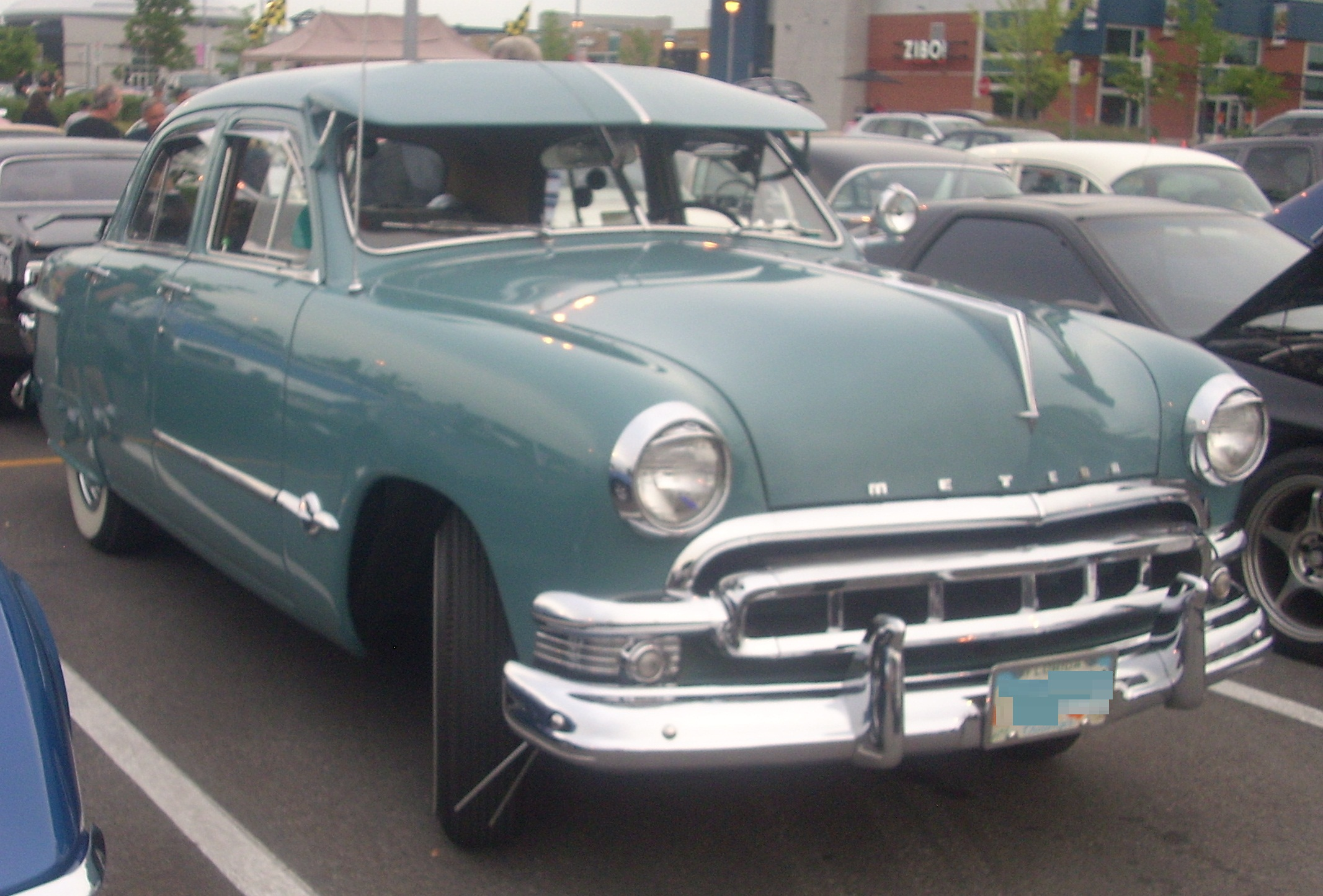
1951 Meteor

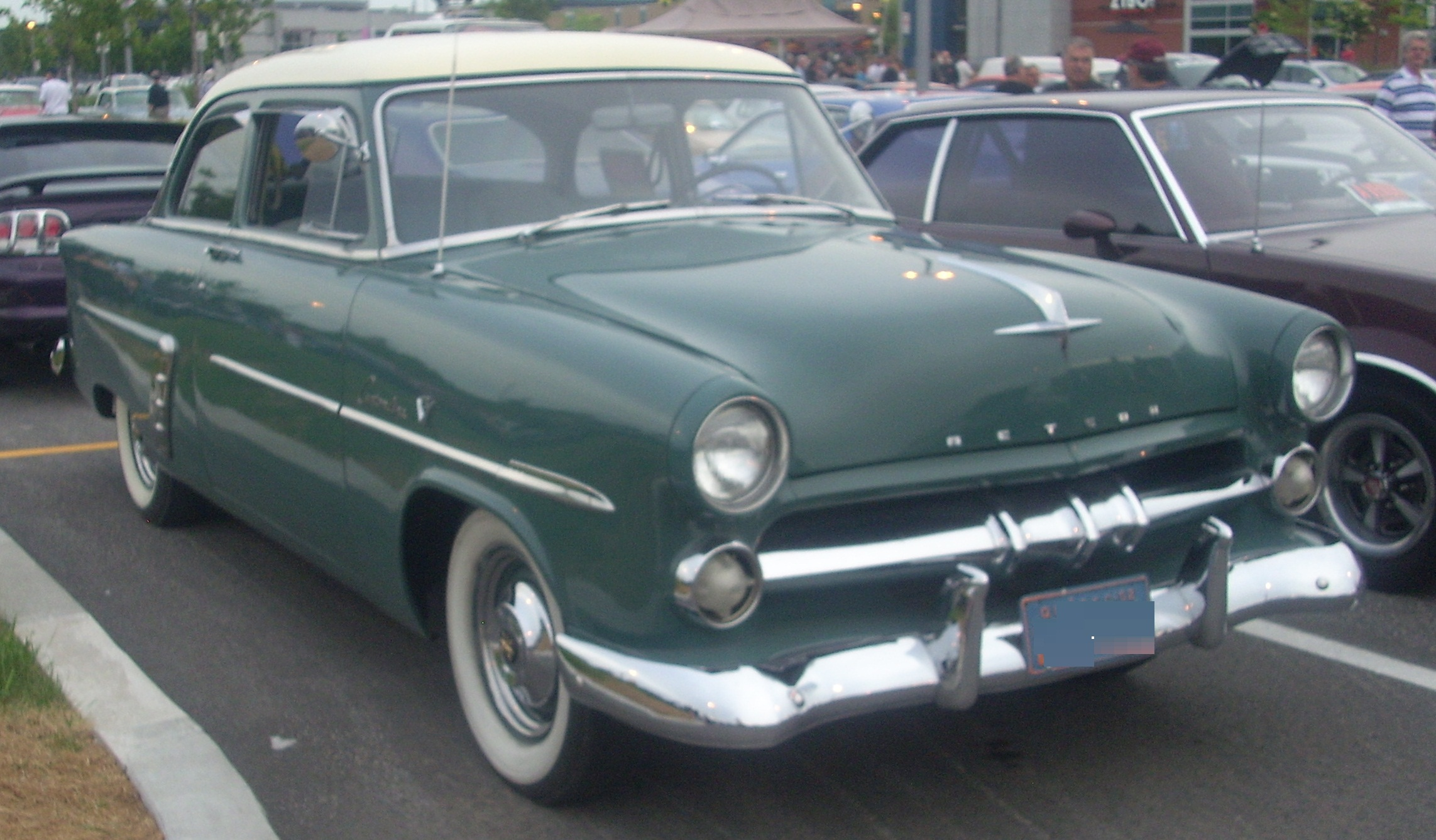
1952 Meteor Customline Two-Door Sedan

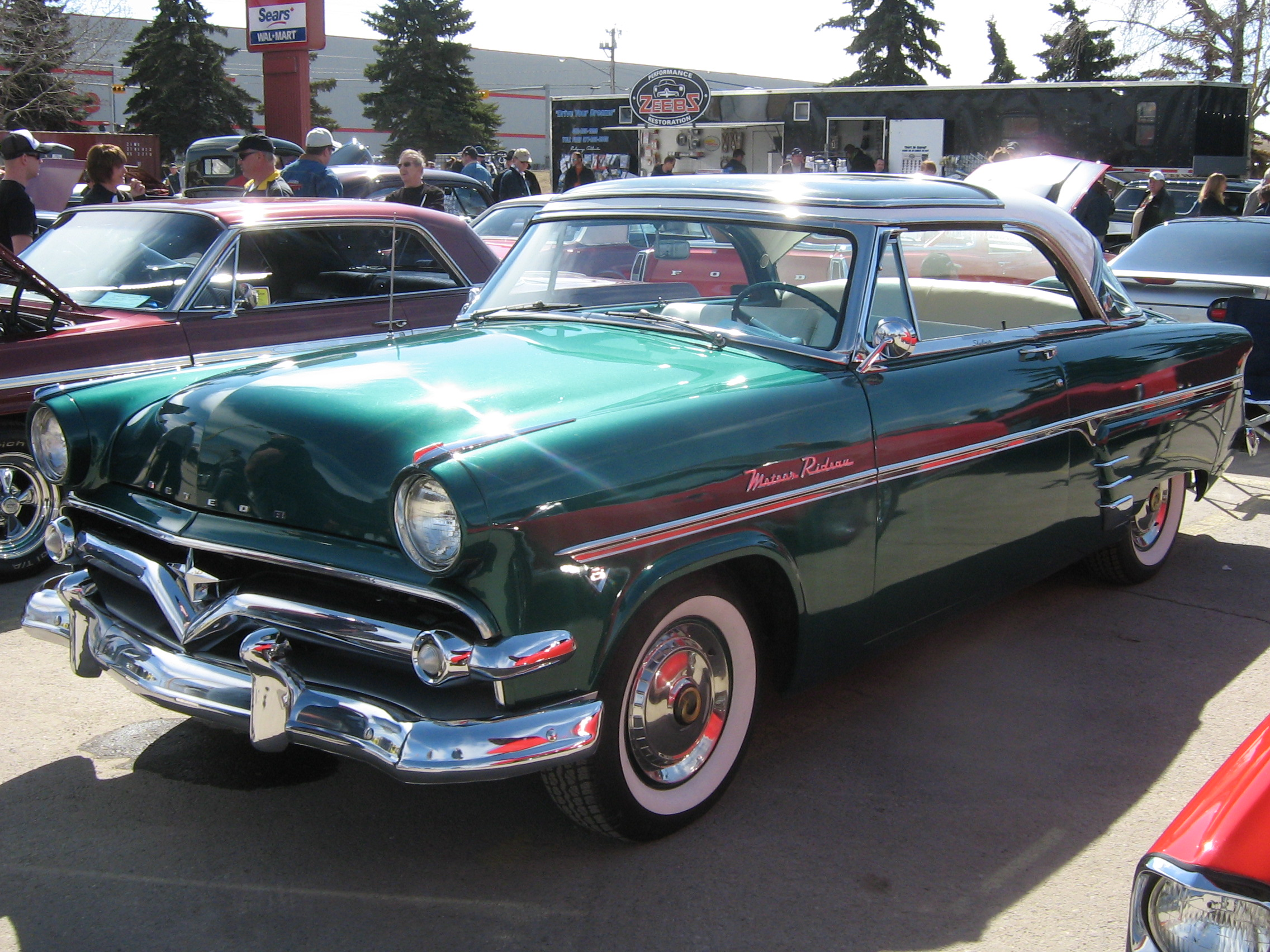
1954 Meteor Rideau Skyliner

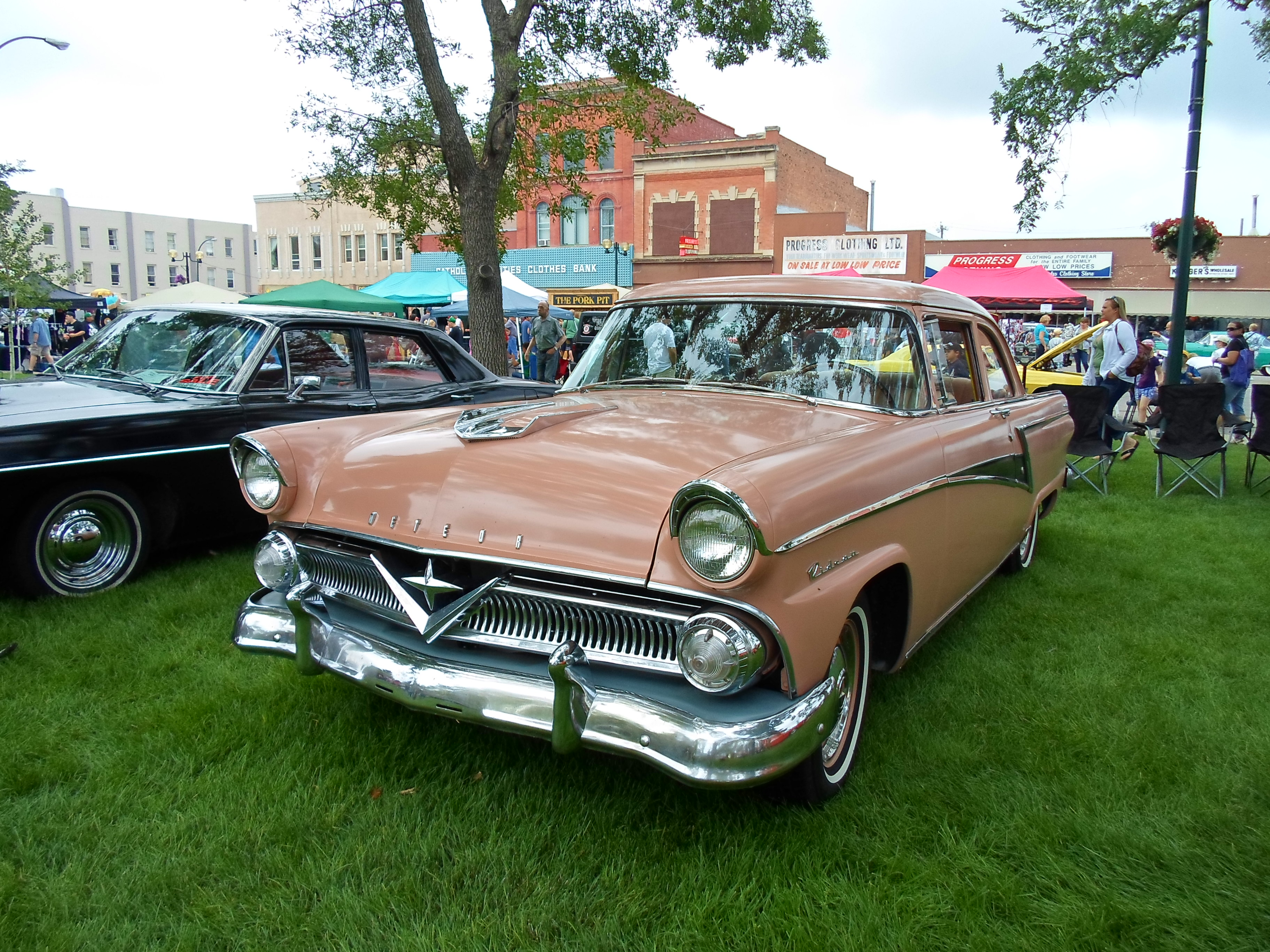
1955 Meteor Rideau Two-Door Club Sedan

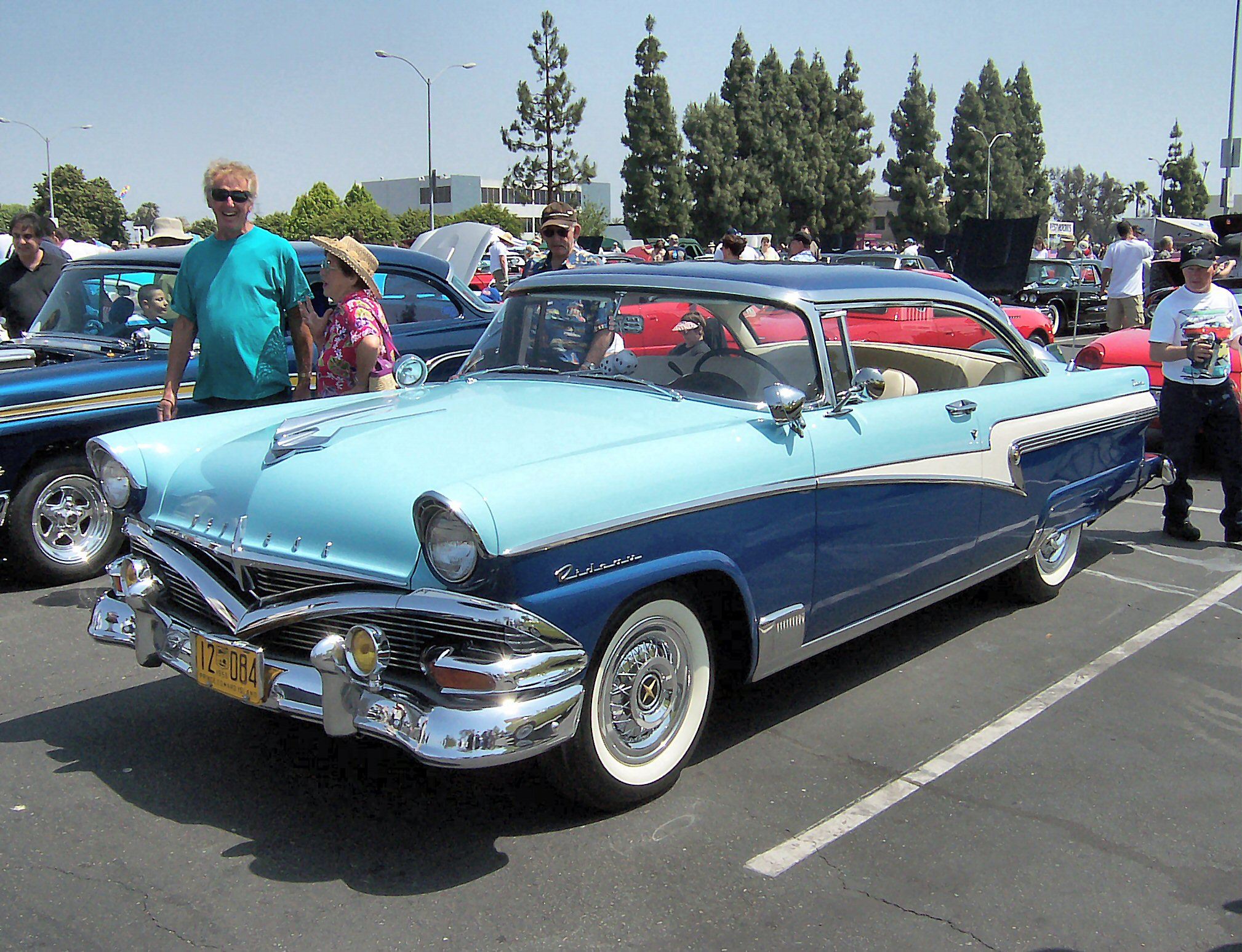
1956 Meteor Rideau Victoria

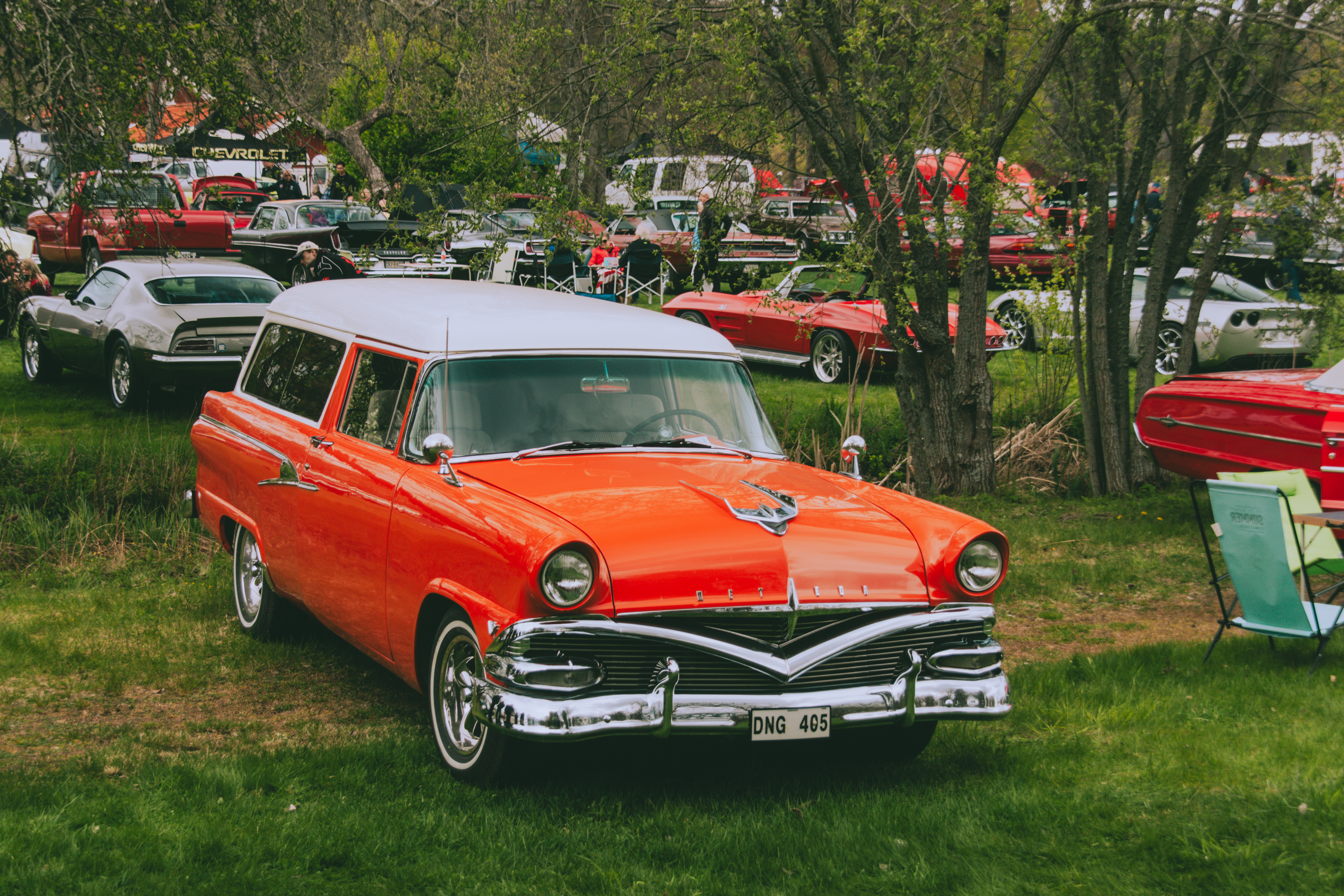
1956 Meteor Ranch Wagon (with non-standard wheels)

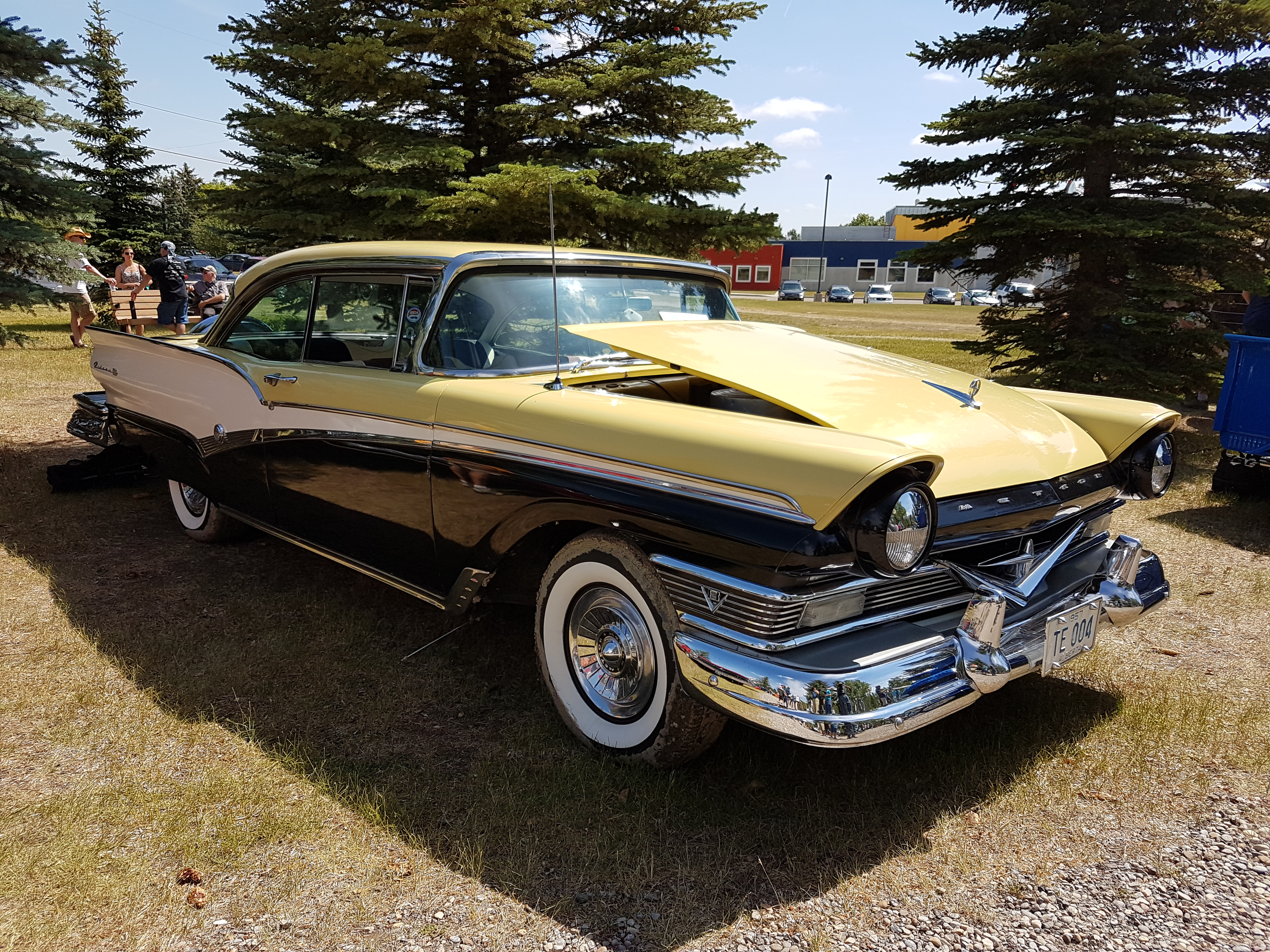
1957 Meteor Rideau 500 Two-Door Victoria Hardtop

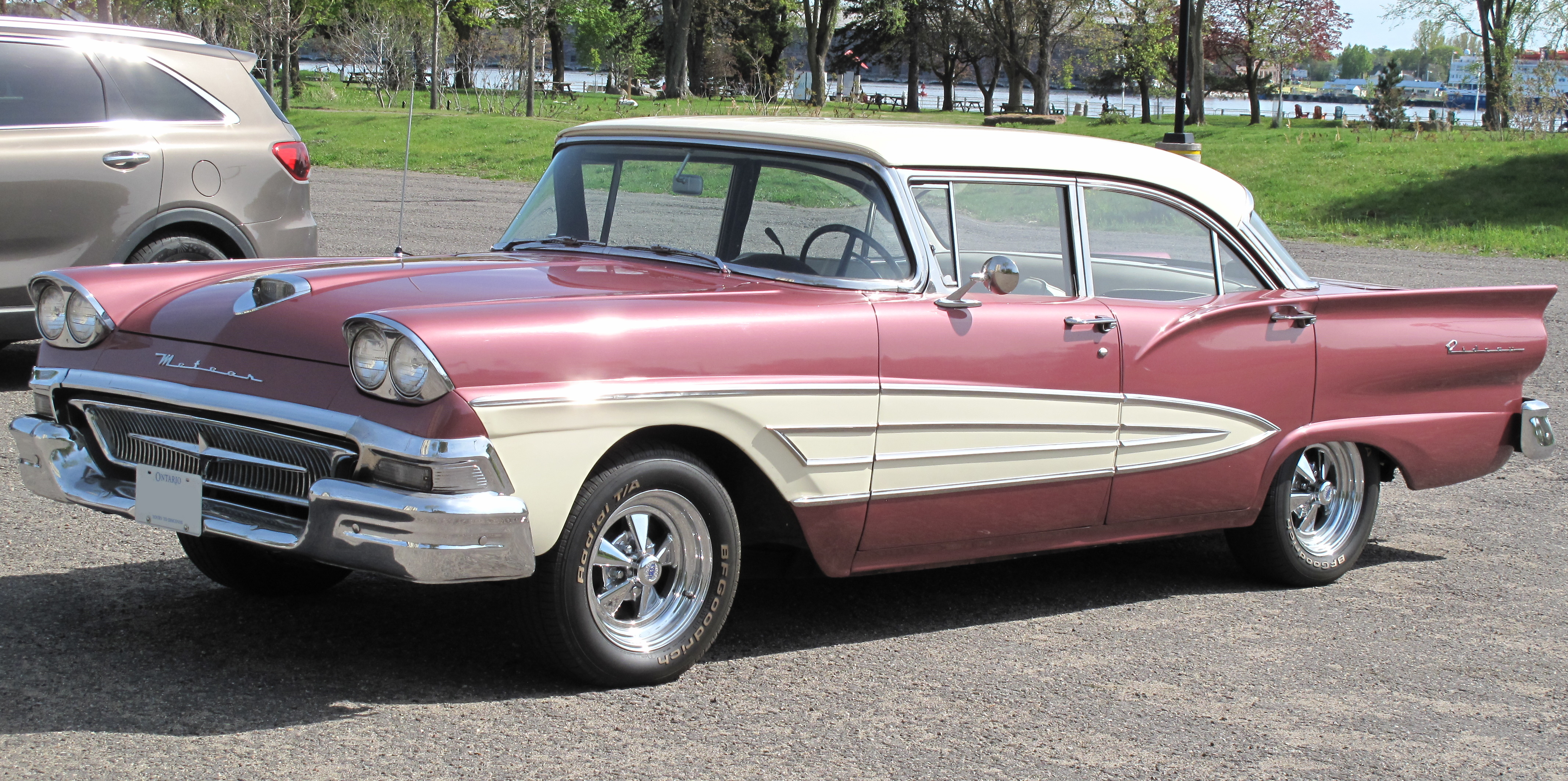
1958 Meteor Rideau Four-Door Sedan (with non-standard wheels)

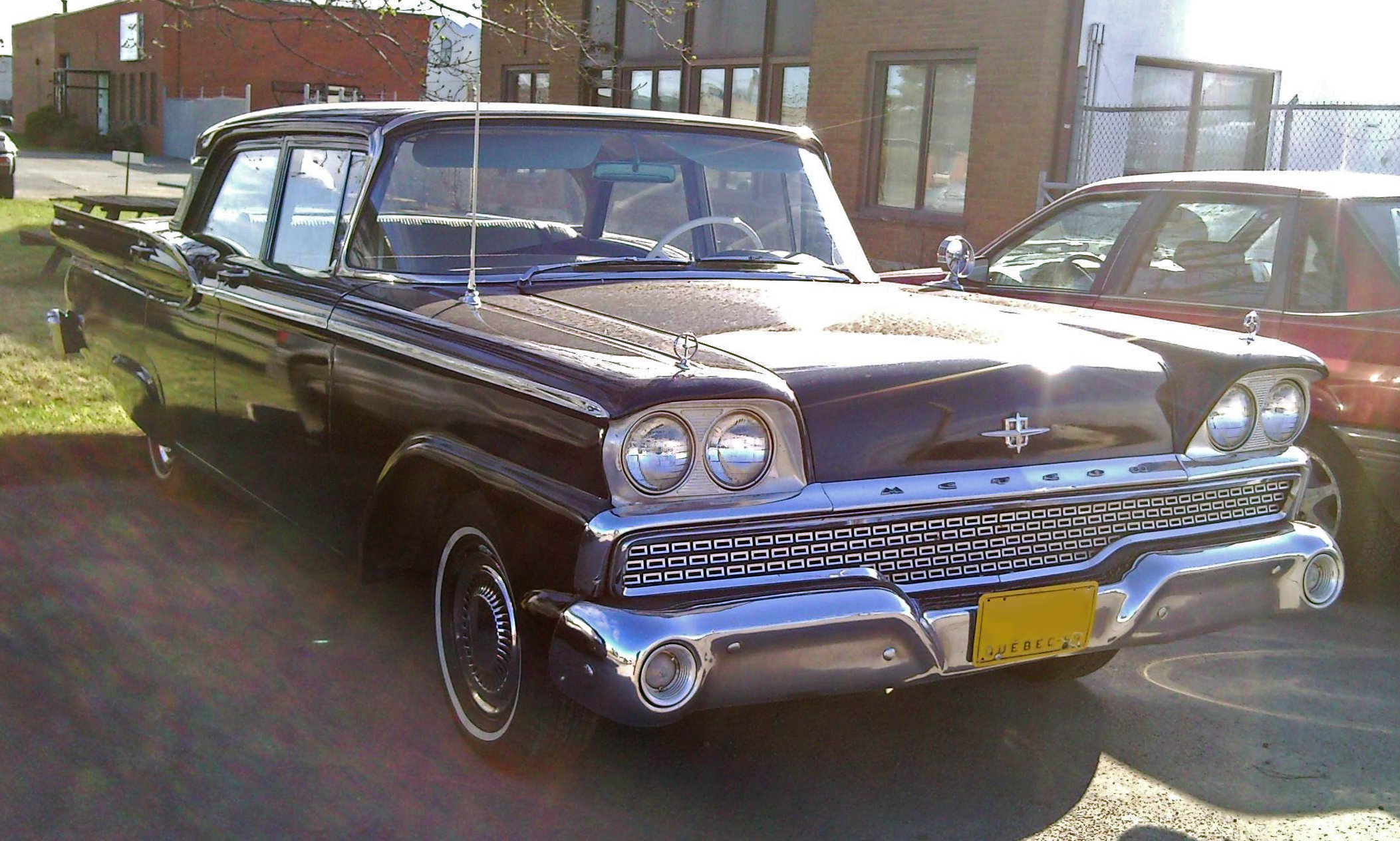
1959 Meteor Niagara 300 four-door sedan

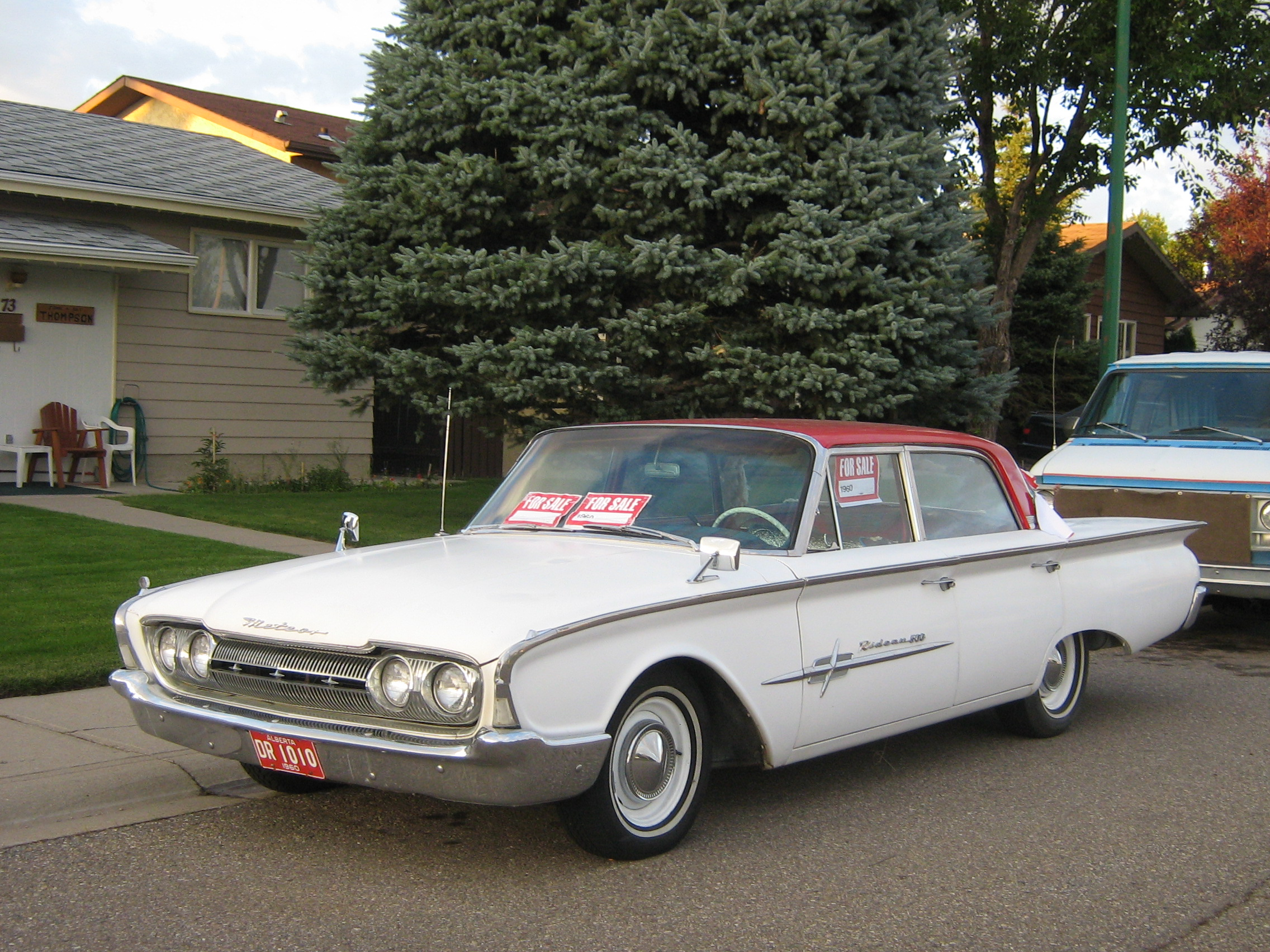
1960 Meteor Rideau 500 four-door sedan. Save for grille insert, trim and taillights, this car is virtually identical to the Ford Fairlane 500 of the same year.

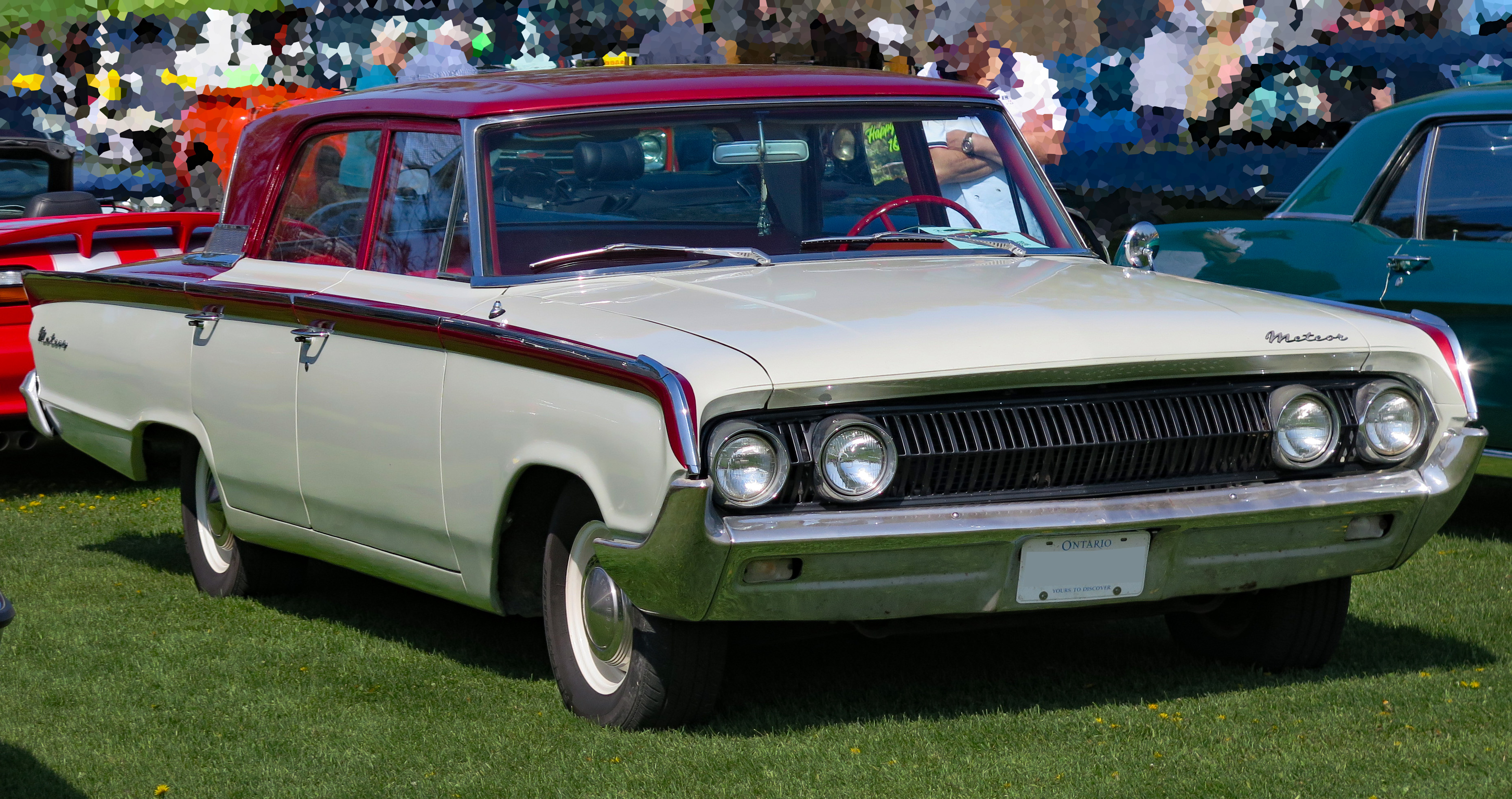
1964 Meteor 4-Door Sedan

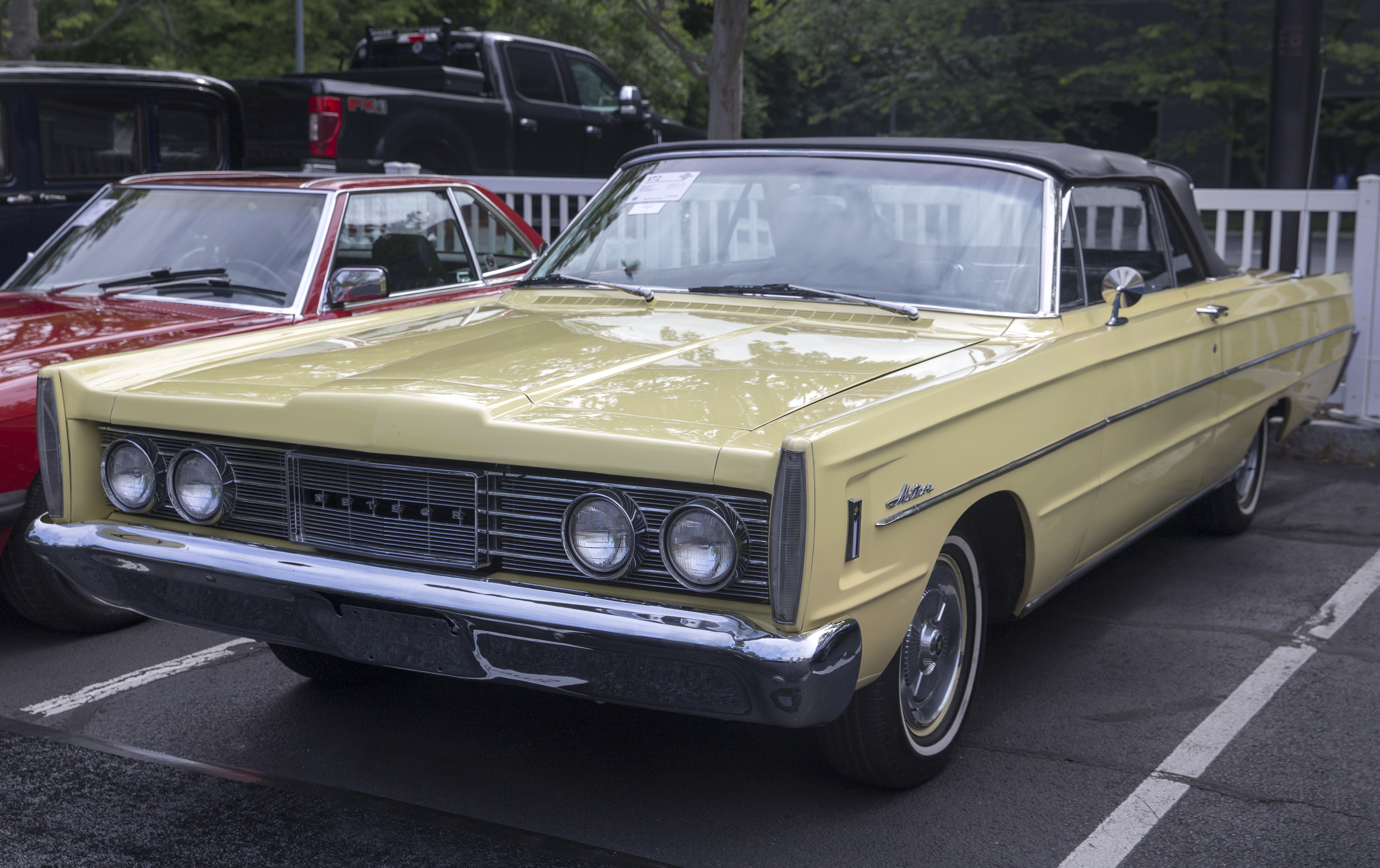
1965 Meteor Montcalm Convertible

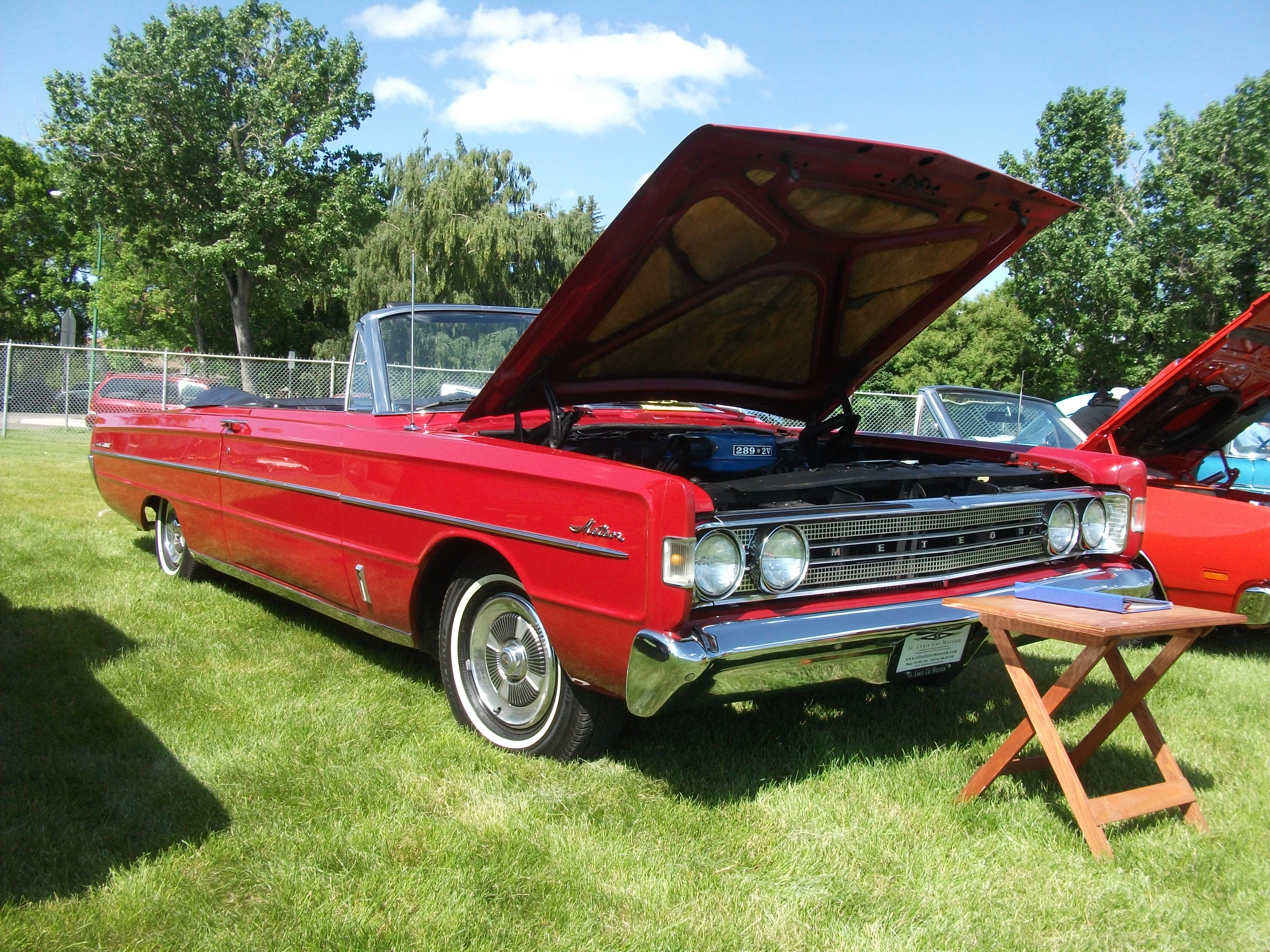
1966 Meteor Montcalm S33 Convertible

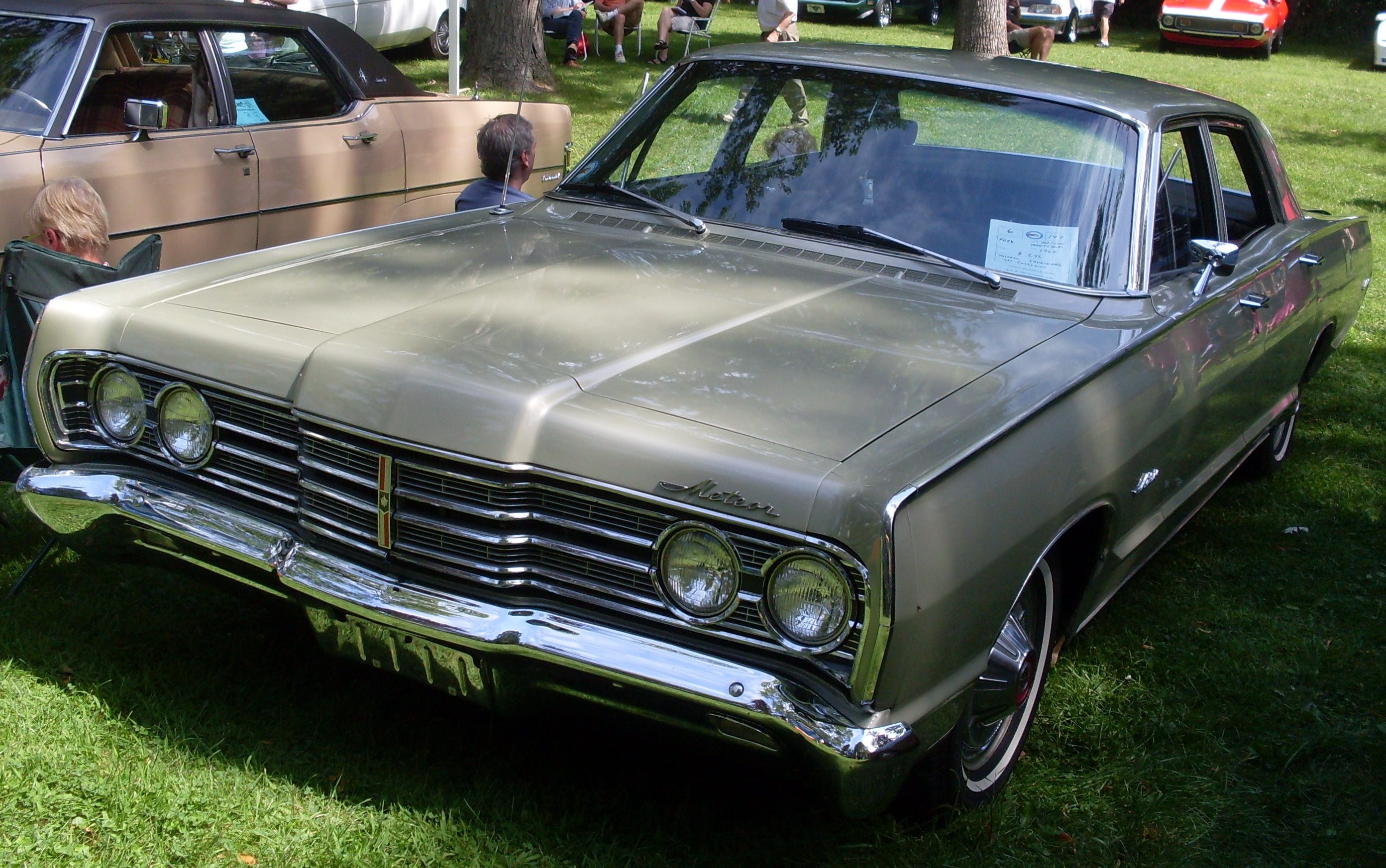
1967 Meteor Montcalm 4-Door Sedan

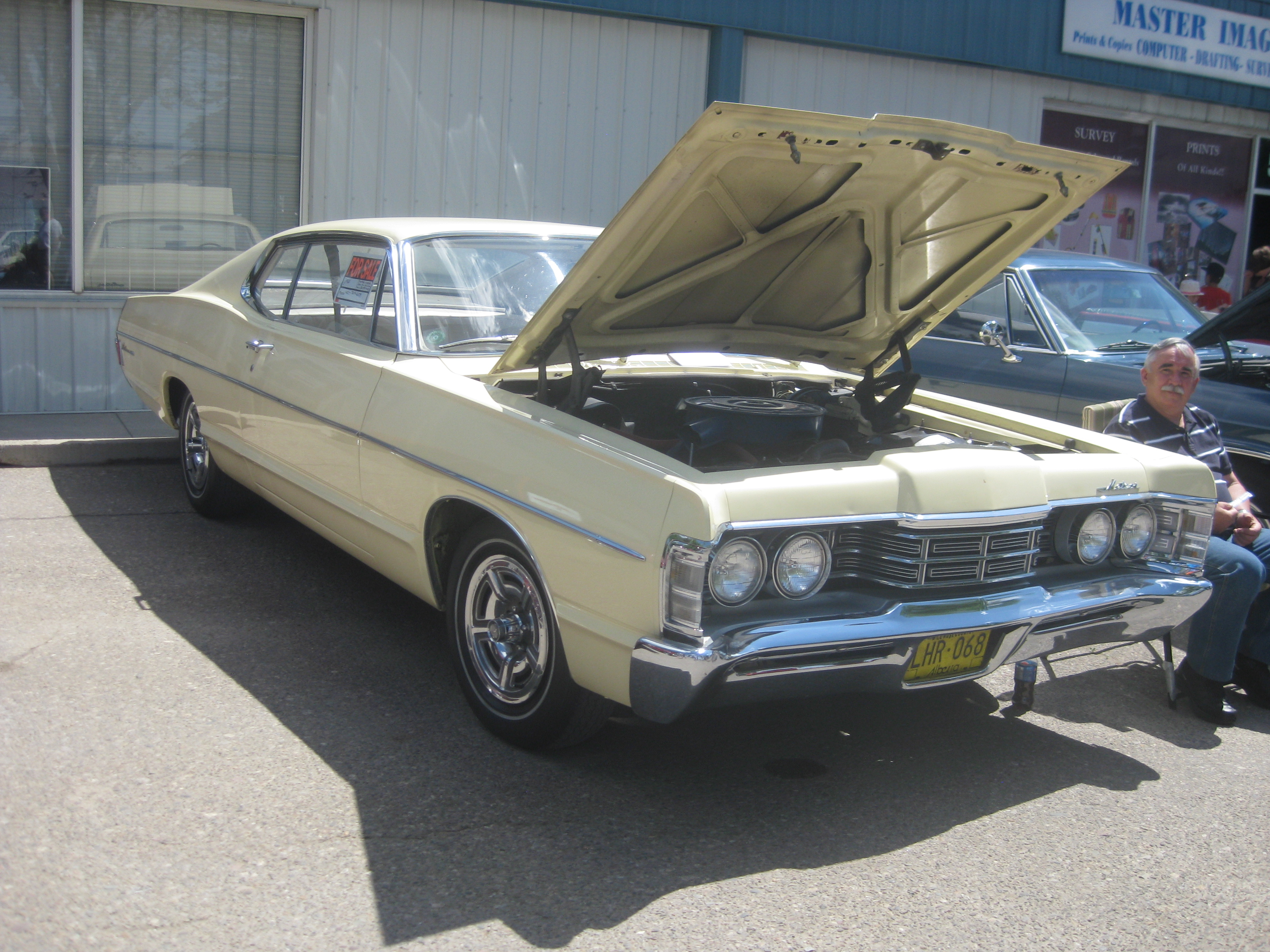
1968 Meteor Rideau 500 two-door hardtop

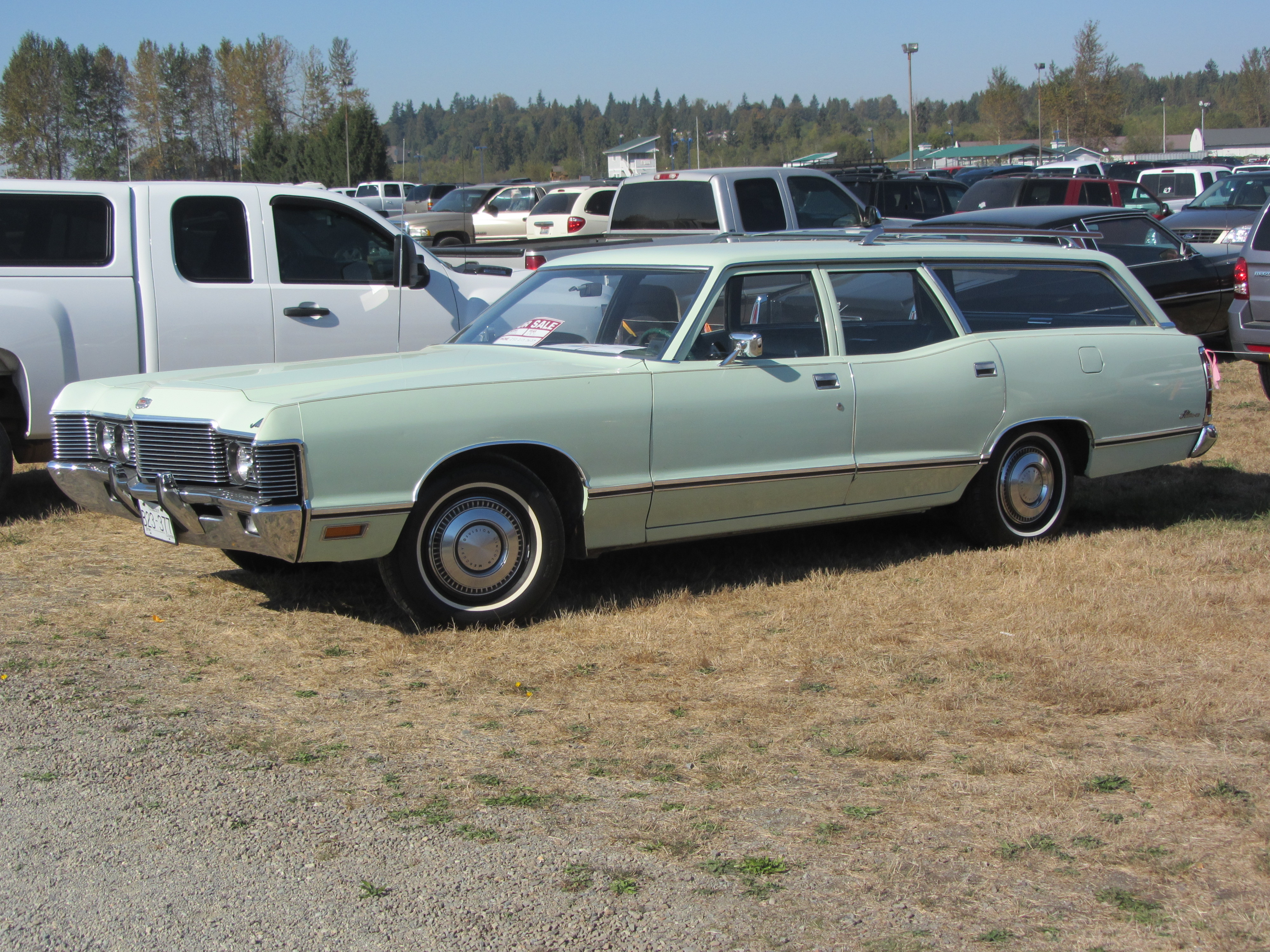
1971 Mercury Meteor Rideau 500 station wagon

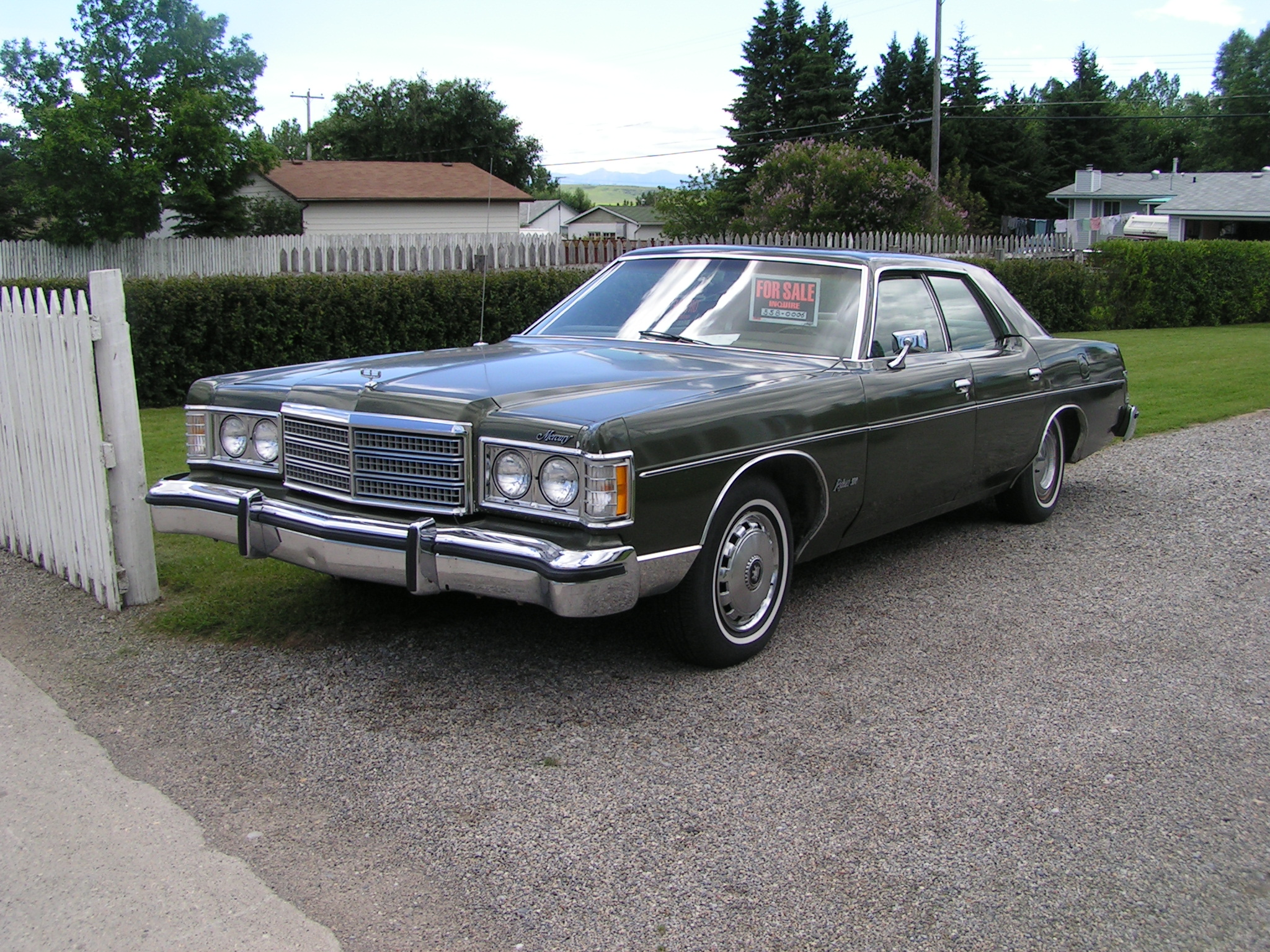
1975–1976 Mercury Meteor Rideau 500 four-door pillared hardtop
