= Meteor Rideau =

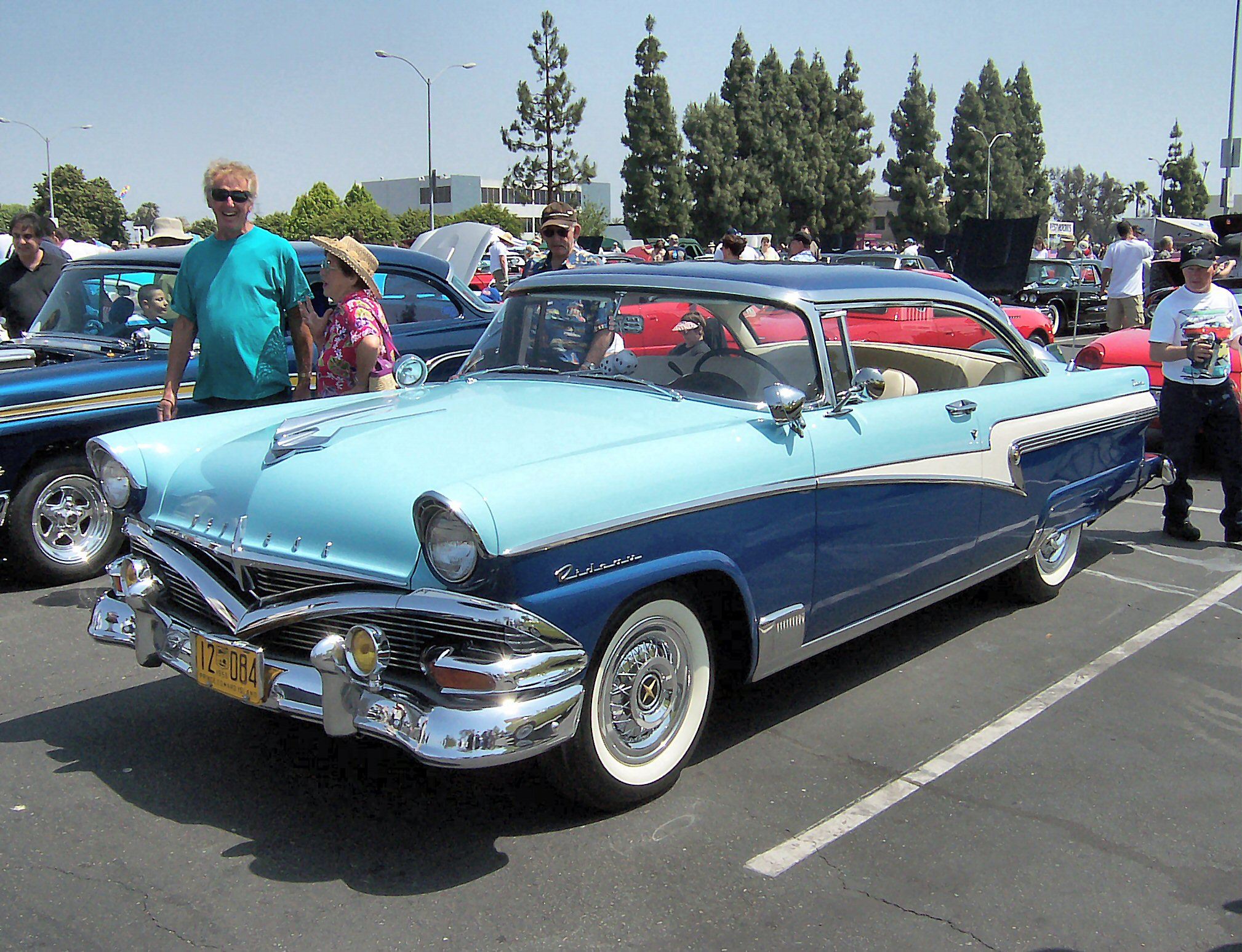
- 1956 Meteor Rideau Victoria by the owner Ronnie Nilsson

Overview
- Manufacturer: Ford Motor Company of Canada
- Production: 1954–1961; 1965–1976
- Assembly: Oakville Assembly, Oakville, Ontario, Canada

Body and chassis
- Class: Full-size
- Body style: 4-door sedan 2-door coupe
- Layout: FR layout

The Meteor Rideau is a full-sized automobile produced by Ford Motor Company of Canada under its Meteor brand. It was produced from 1954 until 1961 and from 1965 until 1976. It was named for the Rideau River, which drains into the Ottawa River in the Canadian capital, Ottawa. From 1957, the line included both the Rideau series and the higher-trim Rideau 500. The Rideau began as the top trim level of the Meteor line, but beginning with the 1956 models, it was the lowest trim series.

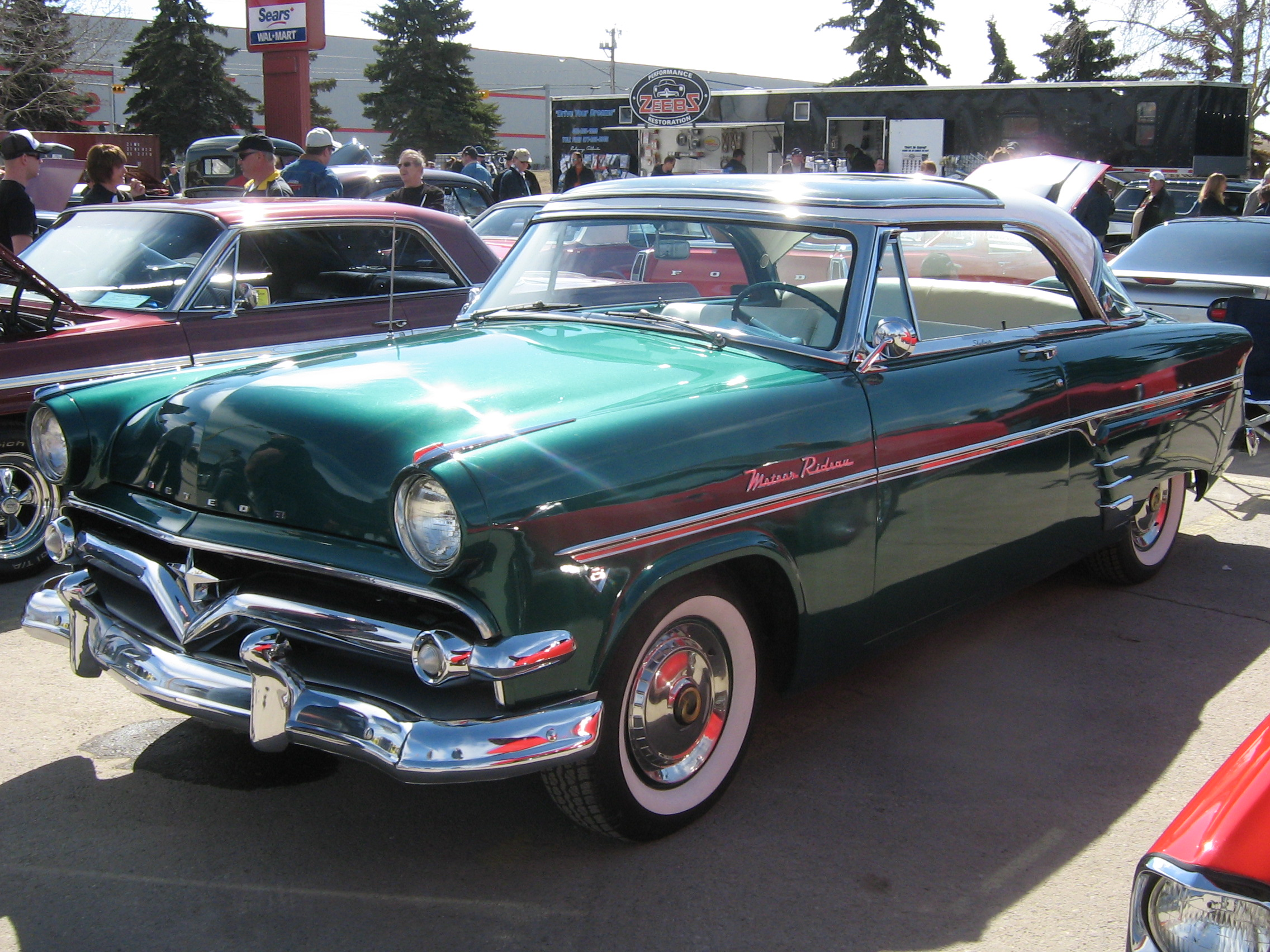
1954 Meteor Rideau

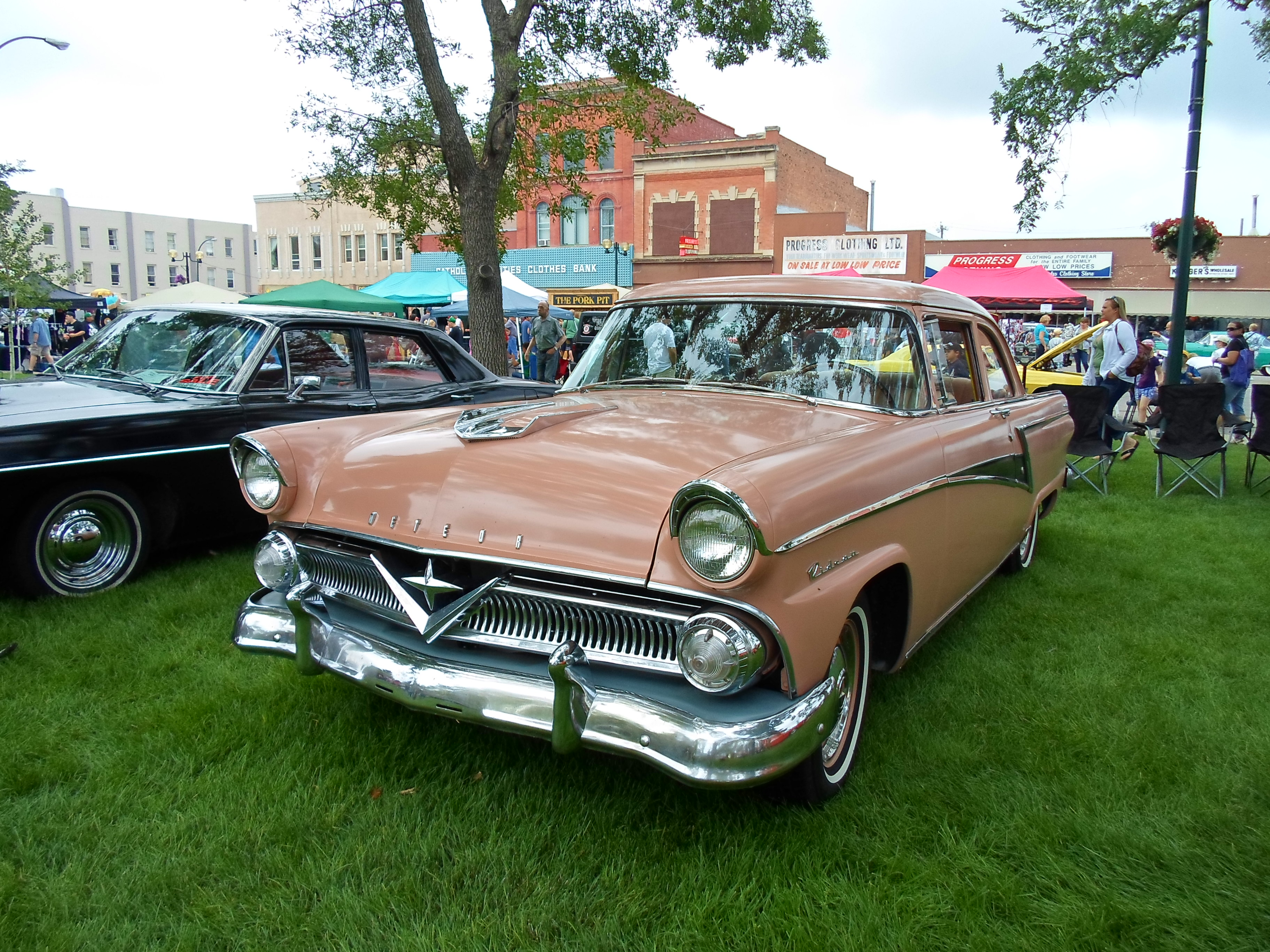
1955 Meteor Rideau Two-Door Club Sedan

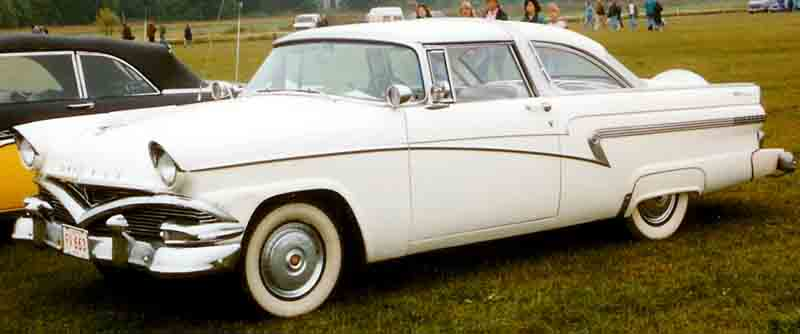
1956 Meteor Rideau Crown Victoria

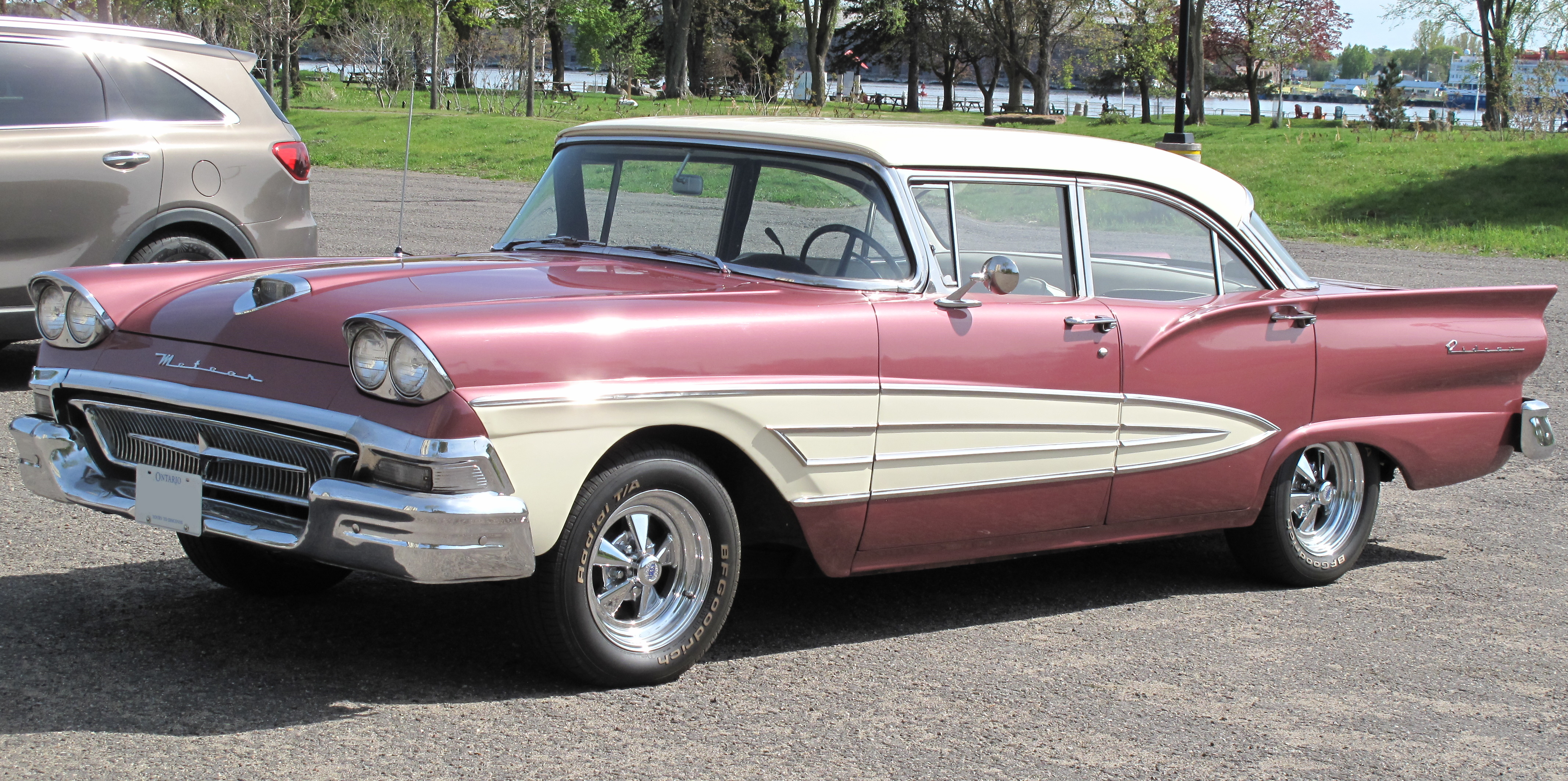
1958 Meteor Rideau (with after-market wheels)

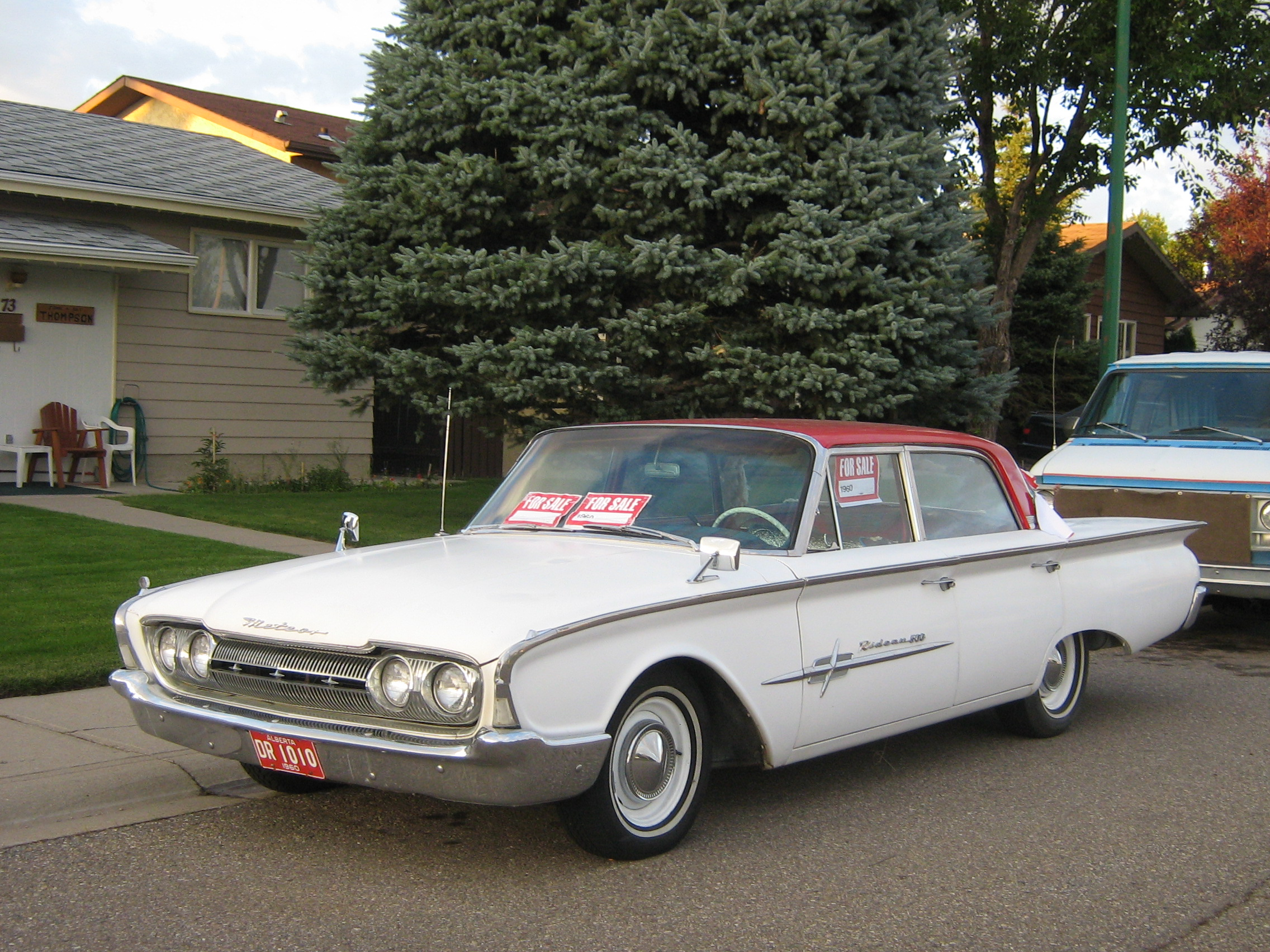
1960 Meteor Rideau 500 four-door sedan: Save for the grille insert, trim, and taillights, this car is virtually identical to the Ford Fairlane 500 of the same year.

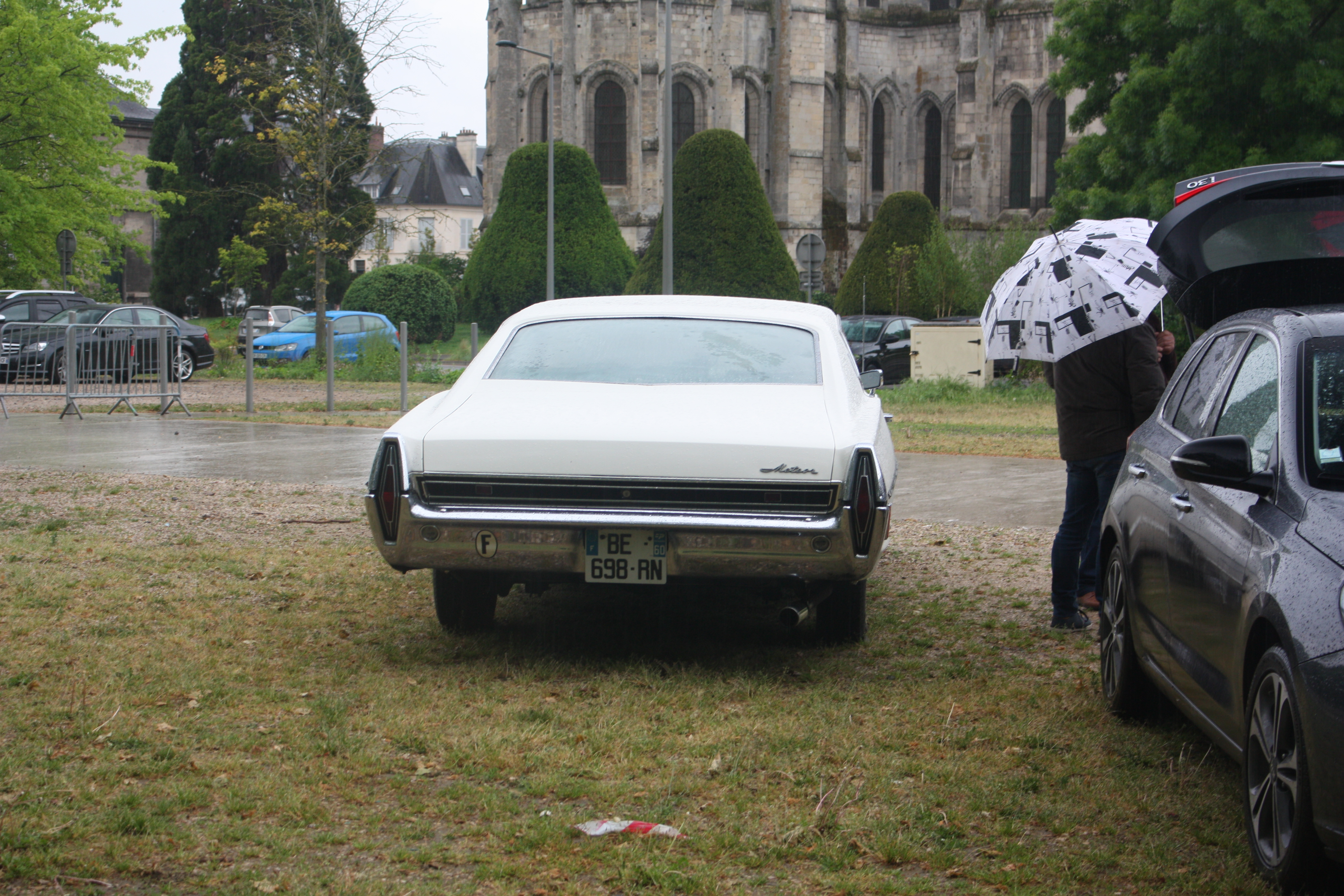
1968 Meteor Rideau 500 - vue arrière

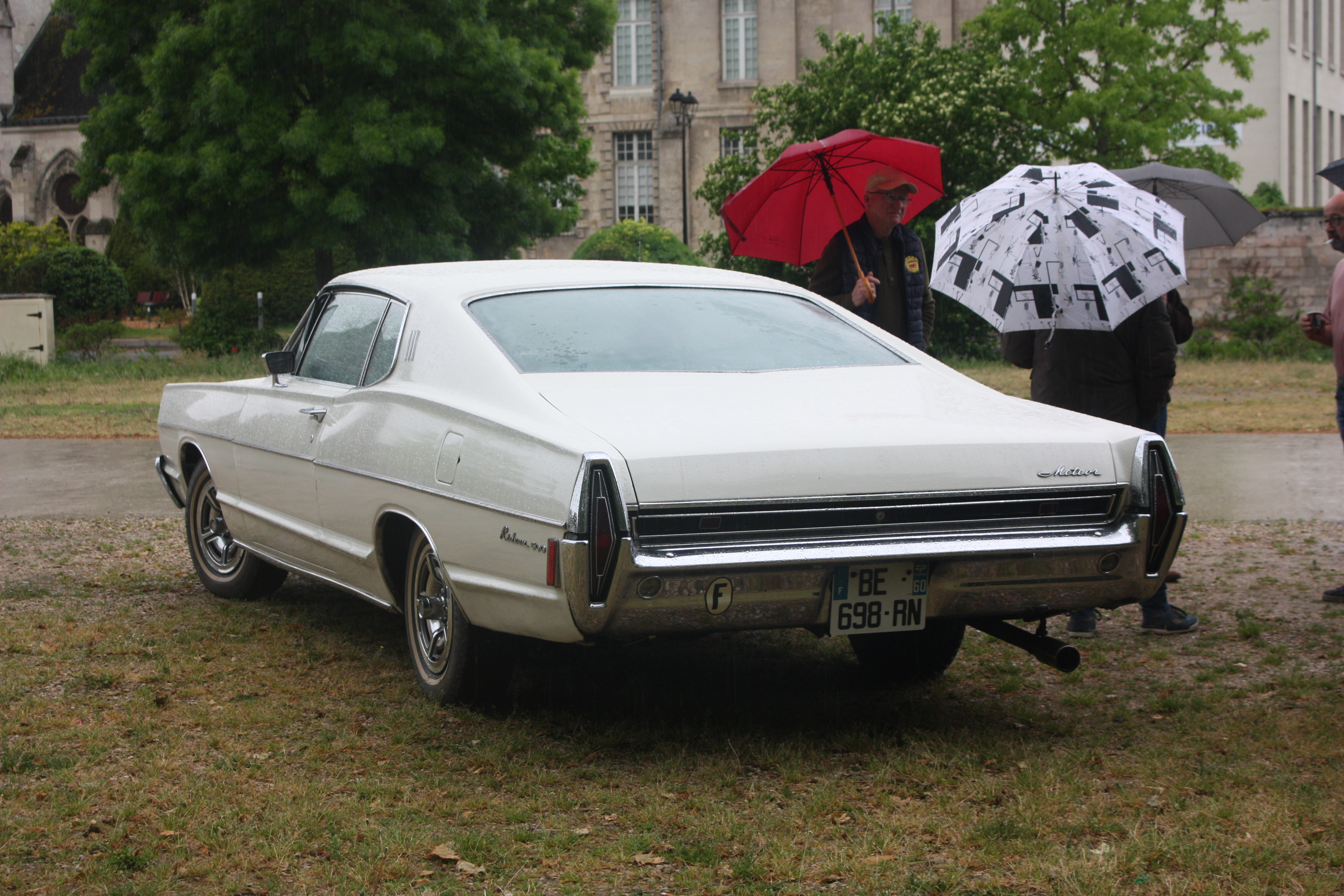
1968 Meteor Rideau 500 - vue 3/4 arrière gauche

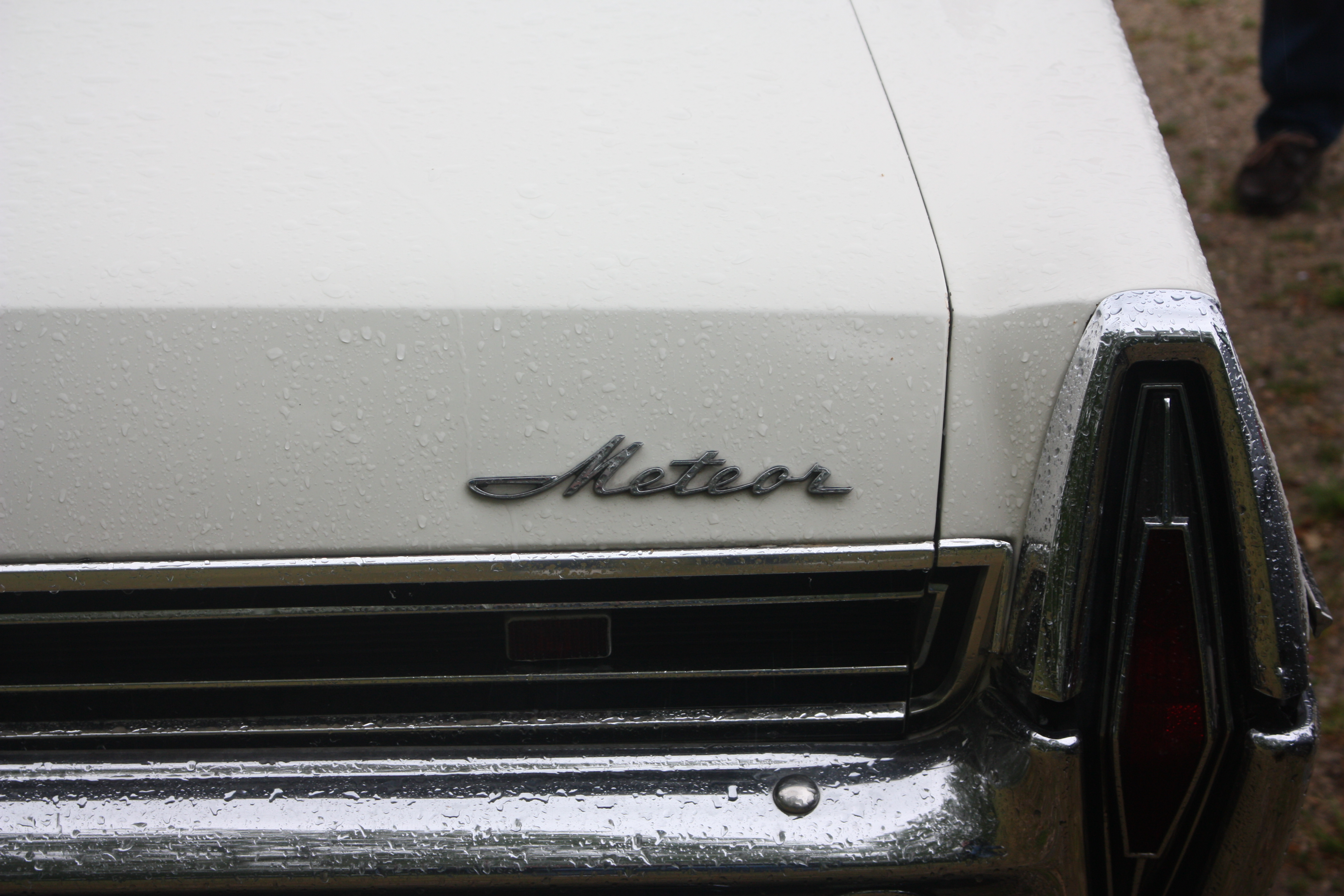
1968 Meteor Rideau 500 - vue feu arrière droit et monogramme

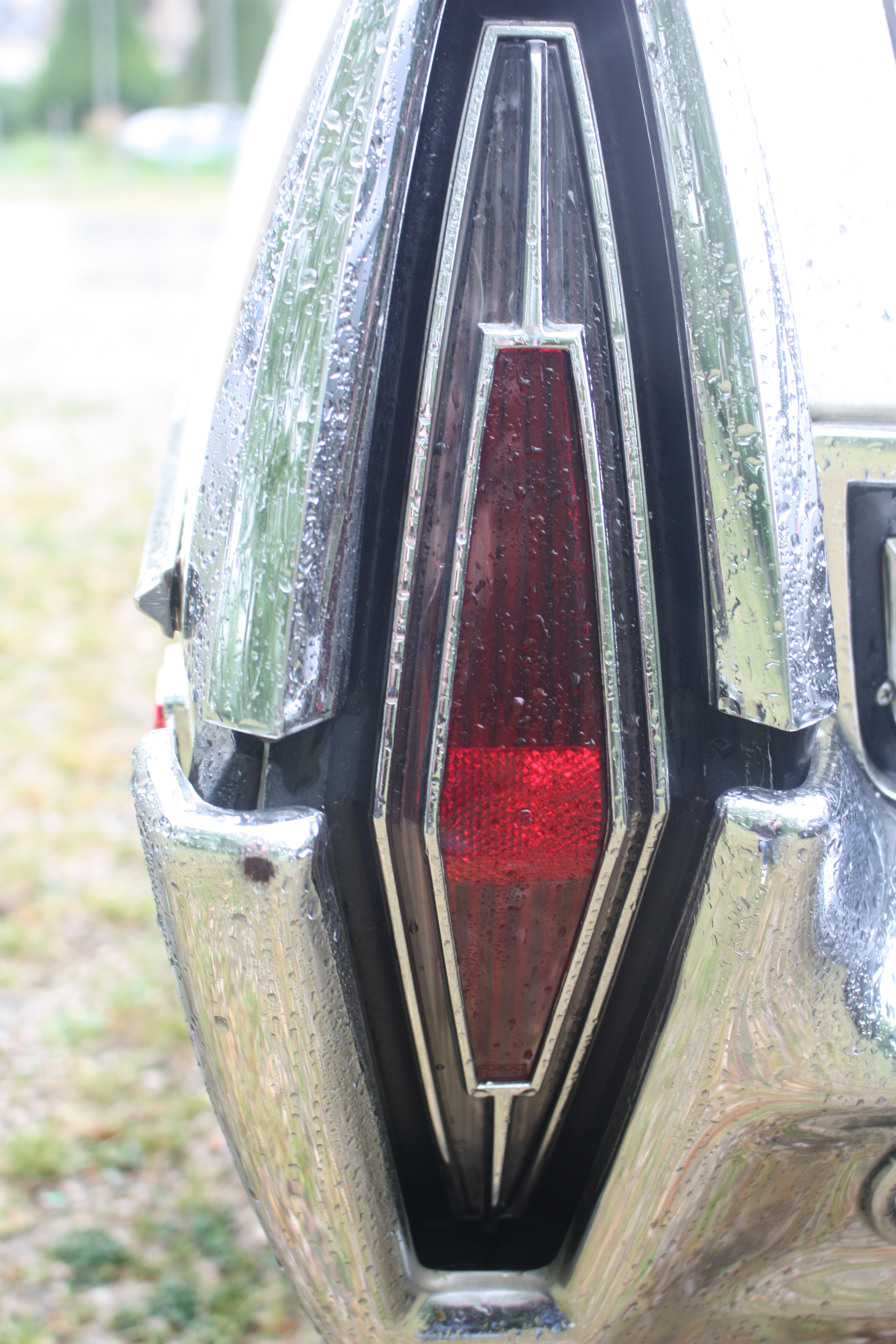
1968 Meteor Rideau 500 - détail du feu arrière gauche

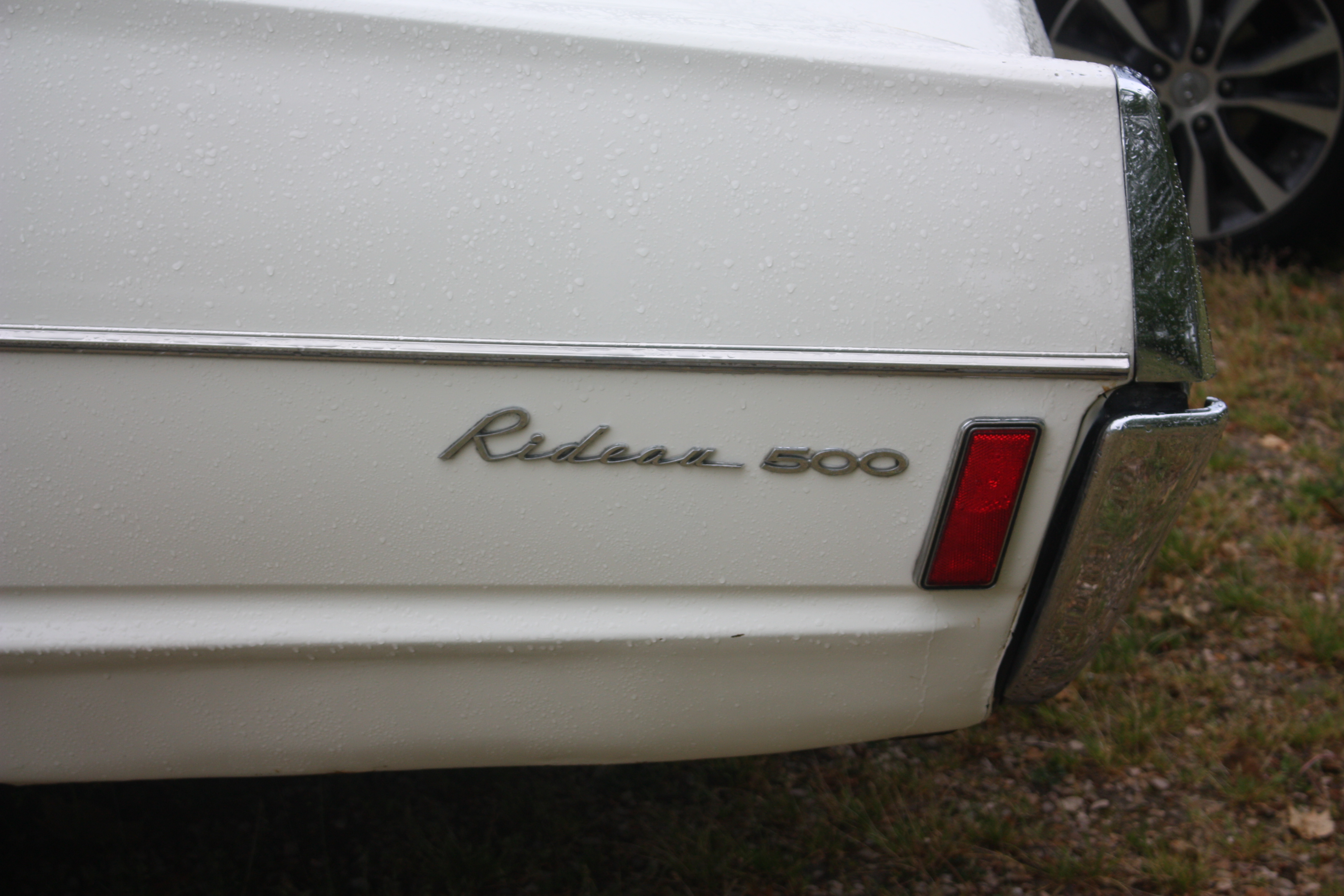
1968 Meteor Rideau 500 - monogramme arrière

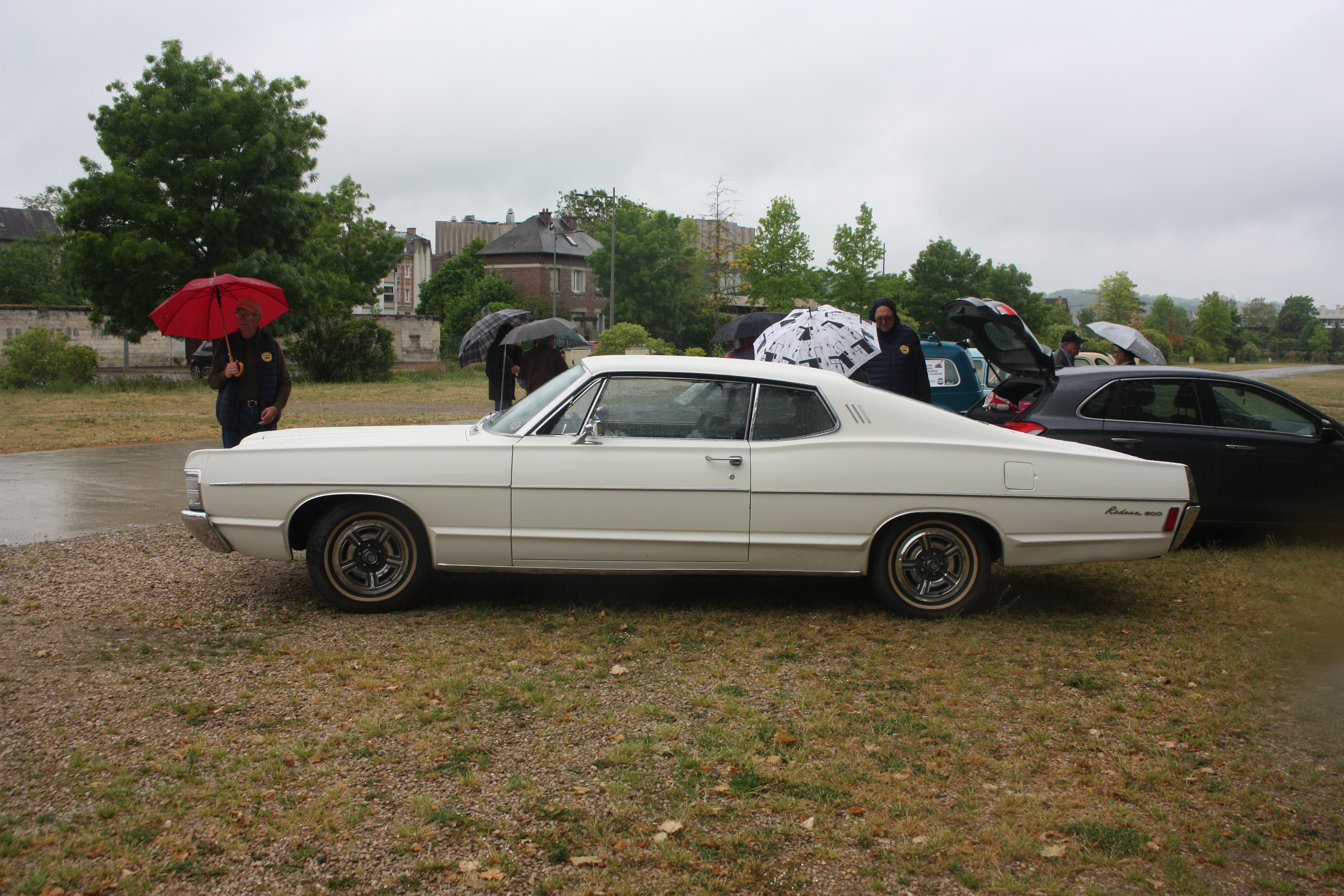
1968 Meteor Rideau 500 - vue de profil

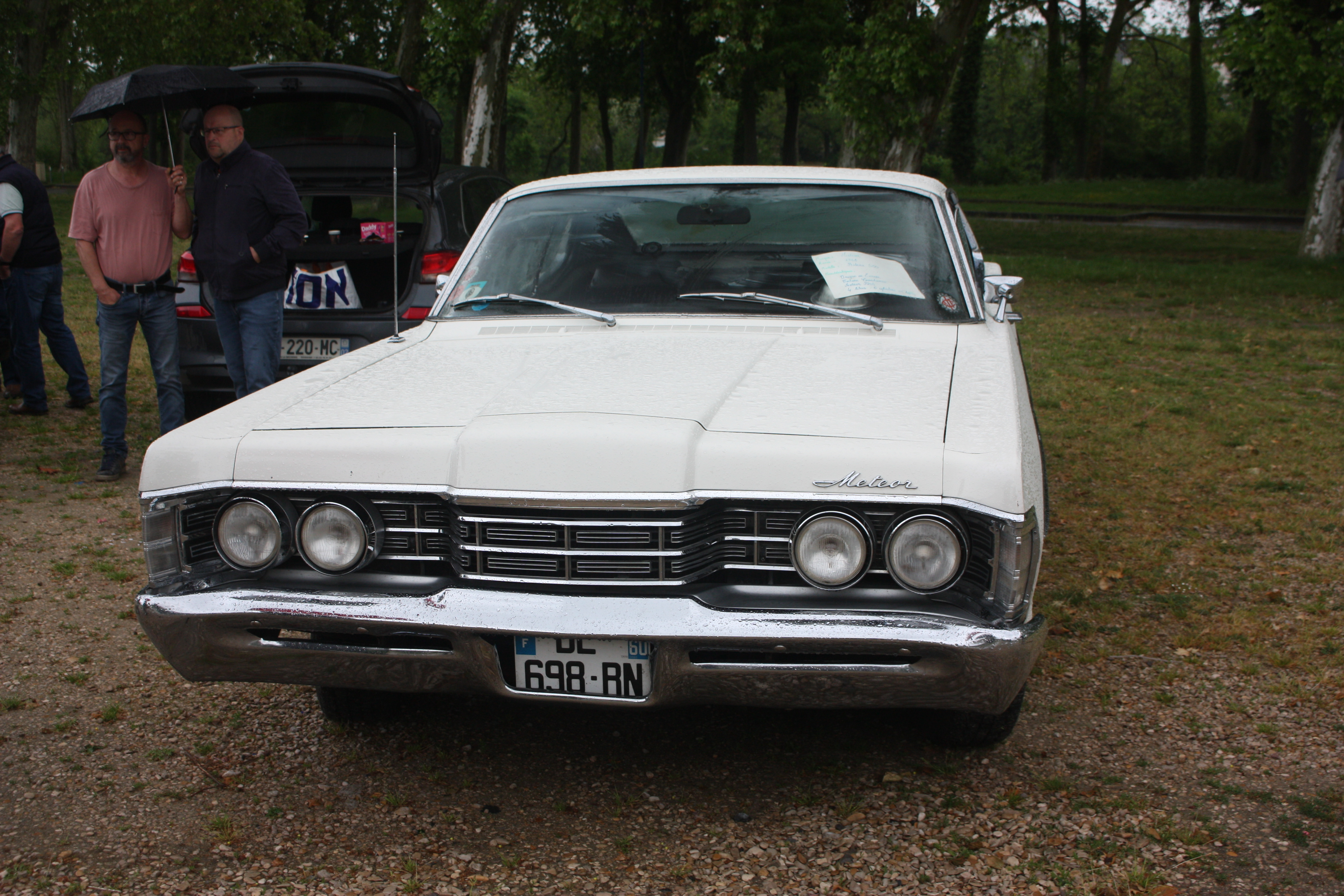
1968 Meteor Rideau 500 - vue avant

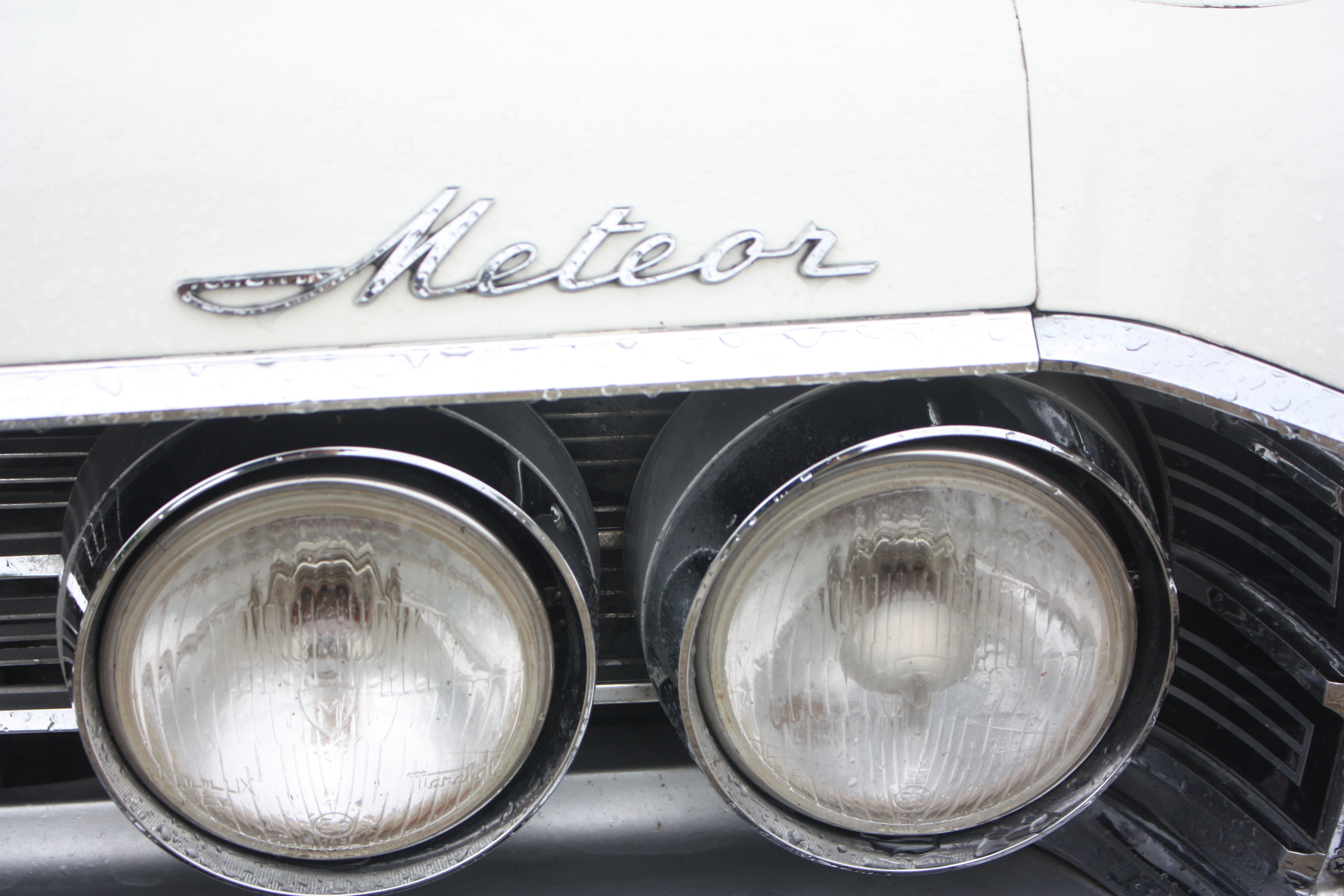
1968 Meteor Rideau 500 - monogramme avant, feux avant gauche

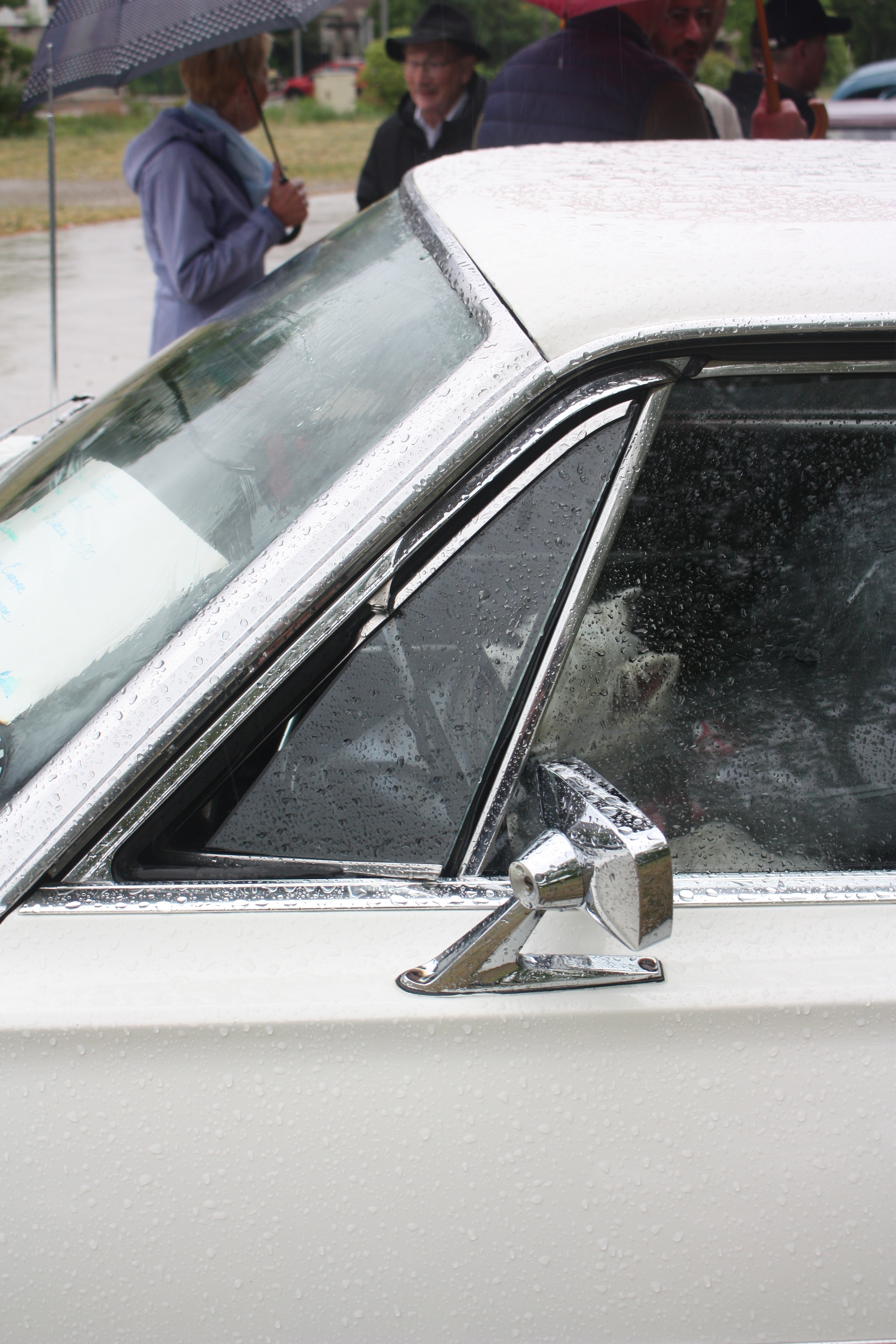
1968 Meteor Rideau 500 - custode avant

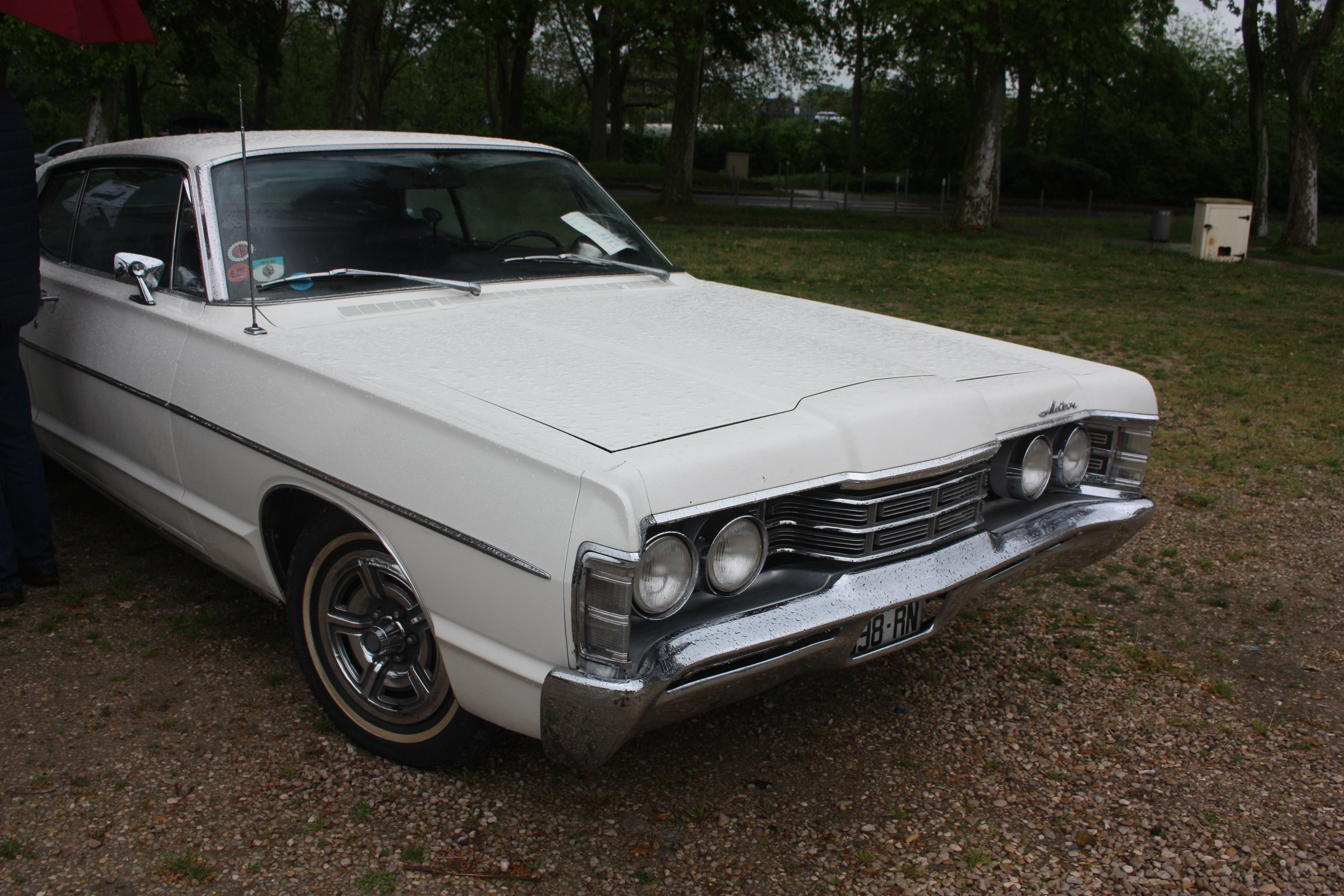
1968 Meteor Rideau 500 - vue 3/4 avant droit

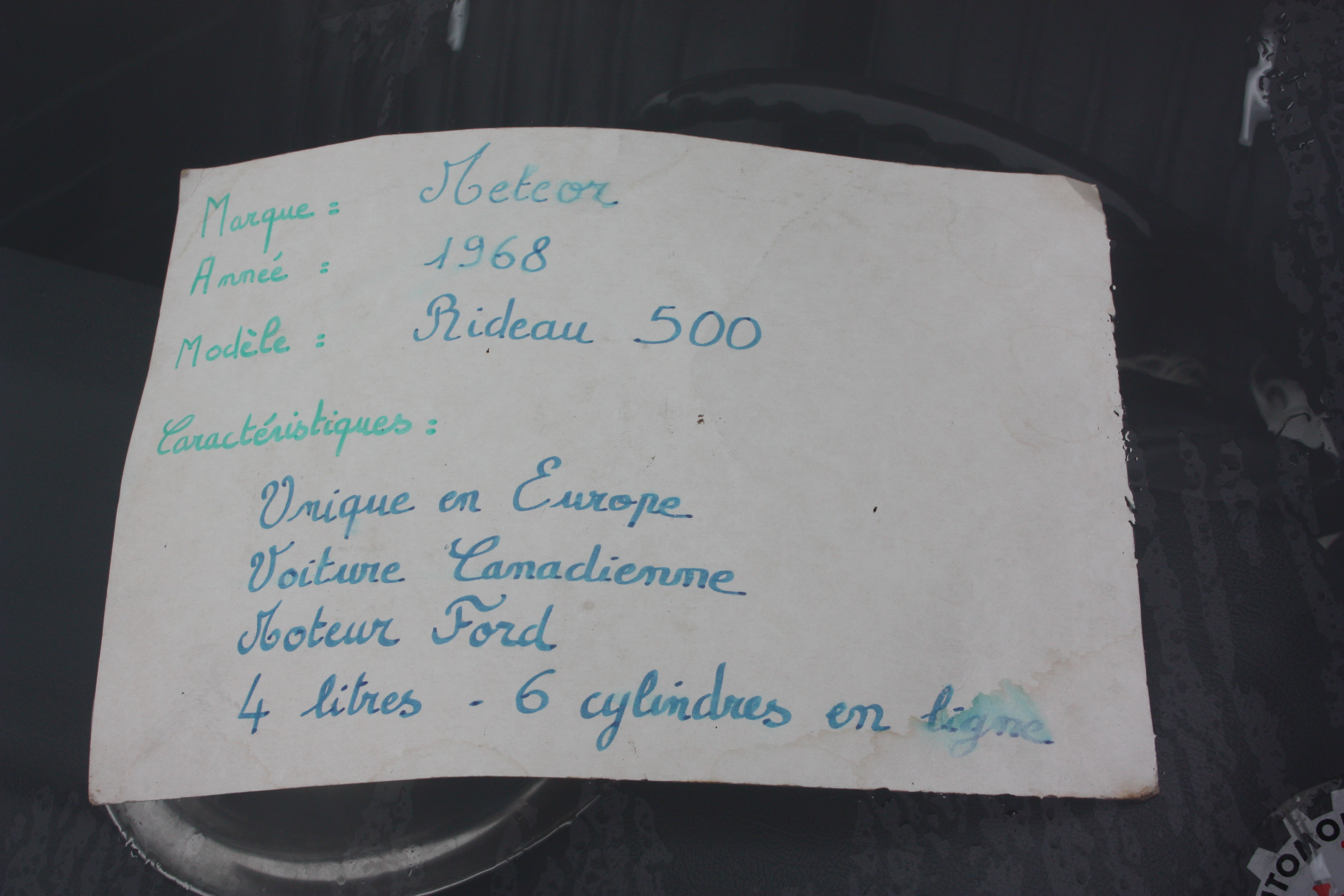
1968 Meteor Rideau 500 - informations de la voiture
